= List of cemeteries in Boone County, Missouri =

This is a list of cemeteries in Boone County, Missouri including the county seat of Columbia as well as the towns of Ashland, Centralia, Hallsville, Sturgeon, Rocheport and Harrisburg. The county contains over 260 known cemeteries. Generally this list does not include Native American burial sites unless they were buried in a European style cemetery. Notable cemeteries include Jewell Cemetery State Historic Site, Columbia Cemetery, and Mt. Zion Cemetery, all three on the National Register of Historic Places.

Cemetery relocated from original location
Cemetery in extreme disrepair or abandonment

Name	Image	Location	Type	Description
Antioch Cemetery		Columbia; 38°59′07″N 92°16′26″W	Church	Antioch Cemetery is located on the north side of Mexico Gravel Road east of the Hinkson Creek bridge. Antioch Church was built here during the summer and fall of 1853. Prior to that the congregation was called Bear Creek Church and was located in a log cabin on the banks of Bear Creek. At some point the congregation and church building ceased to exist. As of 2018 the cemetery is fenced and mowed, however, there are toppled and buried monuments.
Ariel Cemetery		Riggs area 39°09′36″N 92°22′25″W	Church	Unusually, a single burial is all that remains of Ariel (pronounced "Errol") Christian Church. Oscar Jacks, the son of one of Ariel's founders. A frame church was dedicated in 1888 as the spiritual successor to nearby Mount Carmel Baptist Church, which closed in 1873. Ariel Church became defunct in 1934 and by 1942 the building was in poor shape. At some point the church burned. The ground was surveyed by the WPA in the 1930s. Many members are buried at Mount Carmel (Sims) Cemetery nearby.
Barnes Chapel Cemetery		Ginlet area 38°51′42″N 92°10′24″W	Church	Located east of Barnes Chapel on Barnes Chapel Road, predictably this cemetery contains many Barnes among others. The church was established in 1896 according to the sign.
Beth Olem Cemetery		Columbia; 38°56′54″N 92°20′06″W	Jewish	Beth Olem is the only Jewish Cemetery in Columbia. Founded in 1880 by the Columbia Hebrew Association, it became part of Columbia Cemetery in 1928. There are over one hundred burials.
Bethel Cemetery		Woodlandview area 39°02′29″N 92°31′12″W	Church	This cemetery belonged to Bethel Baptist Church, now gone. It was the first church and cemetery in Boone County and is the oldest Baptist church in the state of Missouri. The land was once owned by a son of Daniel Boone. Founded in 1817, it is also known as "Old Bethel".
Bethel Cemetery		Columbia; 38°53′32″N 92°20′40″W	Church	This Cemetery is located next to Bethel Baptist Church in south Columbia, Missouri. Founded in 1855, it is the younger of two Bethel Cemeteries in Boone County. The church and cemetery are still active and are currently affiliated with the American Baptist Convention. The Hickam Cemetery is located inside/adjacent to Bethel Cemetery. Bedford-Estes burials were moved here.
Bethlehem Cemetery		Harrisburg area 39°05′49″N 92°27′09″W	Church	Cemetery is located near the intersection of Callahan Creek Road and Bethlehem Road. The Church no longer stands.
Bond's Chapel Cemetery		Hartsburg area 38°42′34″N 92°17′07″W	Church	Next to Bond's Chapel Methodist Episcopal Church. Only the church is listed on the National Register of Historic Places. The cemetery remains active.
Botner Cemetery		Hinton area 39°04′48″N 92°22′55″W	Family	Located across the street from a home at 3200 W Botner Road. Grounds are fenced and the cemetery is owned and well-maintained by a Botner descendant.
Boulton Cemetery		Columbia; 38°59′49″N 92°18′17″W	Family	Also known as the Judge Jesse Boulton Farm Cemetery. At least four burials.
Boyd Cemetery		Finger Lakes State Park; 39°05′22″N 92°19′27″W	Family	Located near the motocross area parking lot, the stones have been moved but a fence and sign mark the area
Brink Cemetery		Sturgeon area 39°13′10″N 92°17′44″W	Family	Very overgrown, at a bend in Lovers Lane southwest of Sturgeon.
Bullard-Barger Cemetery		Englewood area 38°49′02″N 92°10′31″W	Family	Located east of Englewood and north of Englewood Road, it is fenced and some stones have been cleaned.
Cochran Cemetery		Midway area	Family	Located in a front yard
Columbia Cemetery		Columbia; 38°56′59″N 92°20′14″W	Municipal	Original cemetery for the city of Columbia. Placed on the National Register of Historic Places in 2007. Over time it has grown to include the bounds of two other formerly separate cemeteries. Notable burials include Blind Boone, James S. Rollins, William Franklin Switzler, Edwin William Stephens, and Jane Froman.
Conley Cemetery		McBaine area 38°53′18″N 92°26′10″W	Family	Seven Conley family member buried here. Gated and surrounded by a wall.
Centralia Cemetery		Centralia; 39°13′03″N 92°08′05″W	Municipal	Public cemetery owned by the city of Centralia. Located on Missouri Highway 22.
Crews-Sims Cemetery		Ginlet area 38°53′19″N 92°10′06″W	Family	Just south of a right angle in Vemers Ford Road
Dinwiddie Cemetery		Columbia; 38°56′06″N 92°15′08″W	Family	Dinwiddle Cemetery is located in a grove of trees near the fourth hole of Old Hawthorne Golf Course. Most markers are out of place and propped against trees. Several stones have birthdates in the 1700s.
Dripping Springs Cemetery		Hinton area 39°05′13″N 92°22′30″W	Church	Cemetery for Dripping Springs Christian Church located in the community of Dripping Springs.
Ellington Cemetery		Midway area 38°58′27″N 92°29′19″W	Family	Very overgrown and derelict Cemetery, some headstones still standing in 2021, Located near I-70 on private property.
Elmwood Cemetery		Columbia; 38°57′02″N 92°20′16″W		Established in 1914 next to the Columbia Common Burial Grounds and merged with the Columbia Cemetery two years later.
Estes Cemetery		Columbia; 38°55′45″N 92°16′03″W	Family	As of 2018 cemetery stands in a grove of trees, abandoned, surrounded by residential development
Estes-Bedford Cemetery		Columbia; 38°53′34″N 92°20′42″W	Family	Was located near Bethel Road close by Gentry Middle School. 16 graves moved to Bethel-Hickam.
Evans Cemetery		Rucker area 39°14′13″N 92°25′00″W	Family	Located in a grove of old ceder trees on a farm north of Rucker. Many field-stones are visible indicating at least six burials. No dressed stones were visible as of 2018.
Everett Cemetery		Woodlandville area 39°03′41″N 92°27′48″W	Church	About one mile east of Woodlandville, Everett Church (Methodist South) was established in 1859. A descendant of Daniel Boone is buried here.
Far West Cemetery		Sturgeon area 39°11′54″N 92°14′21″W		Located on Barns Road southeast of Sturgeon.
Fairview Cemetery		Columbia; 38°56′09″N 92°22′49″W	Church	At the intersection of Chapel Hill and Fairview roads behind an old church now used as a daycare.
Forbis Cemetery		Ashland area 38°47′05″N 92°17′55″W	Family	Located on the east side of State Highway MM
Fortney Cemetery		Columbia area 38°52′43″N 92°18′51″W	Family	Located on farmland north of Rock Bridge State Park
Fountain Cemetery		Centralia area 39°11′46″N 92°12′43″W	Family	Located northwest of Tri-City Lake and abandoned in the woods. There are several large toppled granite markers and many Yucca plants, potentially marking many graves. Area appears fairly large for a family cemetery.
Friedens Evangelical Cemetery		Hartsburg; 38°41′55″N 92°18′32″W	Church, German	Just outside of the city limits of Hartsburg, Missouri. Associated with Friendens Evangelical Church
Friendship Cemetery		Hallsville area 39°05′53″N 92°17′24″W	Church	Friendship Church still stands unused next to this cemetery.
Glendale Memorial Cemetery		Centralia; 39°13′11″N 92°08′04″W	Modern	Located across highway 22 from Centralia Cemetery and recently created.
German Cemetery		Centralia area 39°08′32″N 92°06′44″W	Family	Small family cemetery, fenced, next to the road.
Goodin Cemetery		Columbia; 38°56′27″N 92°24′10″W	Family	Located in the Georgetown Subdivision near Goodin Branch Creek. Named after the family buried within.
Goshen Cemetery		Wilton; 38°44′05″N 92°21′17″W	Church	Across the street from Goshen Primitive Baptist Church on the bluff above Wilton, Missouri.
Grandview Cemetery		Two-Mile Prairie; 39°02′39″N 92°10′01″W	Church	Standing next to the Grandview Missionary Baptist Church on route Z, this cemetery is on the Two-Mile Prairie.
Green Acres Cemetery		Columbia area 38°56′45″N 92°28′25″W	Natural	According to KOMU-TV Green Acres Natural Burial Cemetery is the only "green' burial in the state. It is across the road from Sugar Creek Cemetery.
Hallsville Church of Christ Cemetery		Hallsville; 39°07′06″N 92°14′38″W	Church	Around the corner from Red Top Christian Church on Missouri Highways 124
Hamilton Cemetery		Shaw area 38°56′54″N 92°11′14″W	Family	Sign near the front gate says "E.A. Hamilton Family Cemetery Boone County Court Trustee"
Hatton Chapel Cemetery		Columbia area 39°00′56″N 92°24′53″W	Church	There is one unmarked infant burial from around 1910 at the northeast corner of the church. It is located on Hatton Chapel Road in western Boone County.
Harris Cemetery		Deer Park area 38°51′20″N 92°15′02″W	Family	Family cemetery on what was formerly a large plantation, now surrounded by thick concrete wall. Several families buried within but most prominently the Harris'
Harrisburg Cemetery		Harrisburg; 39°08′29″N 92°27′20″W	Municipal	This is the public cemetery for town of Harrisburg, Missouri. Located near the east entrance to town at the junction of Route F and Missouri Highway 124.
Henry Cemetery		Columbia; 39°00′41″N 92°16′05″W	Family	Cemetery was preserved and marked in the parking lot of Columbia Foods. Also known as the Keene Cemetery.
Hickam Cemetery		Columbia; 38°53′31″N 92°20′42″W	Family	Hickam Family burials located in/adjacent to Bethel Cemetery in south Columbia, Missouri. A Separate fence and gate, with the name Hickam above, frame the cemetery.
Hicks Cemetery		Hallsville area 39°06′47″N 92°18′56″W	Family	Family cemetery on the homestead founded by Absalom Hicks in the 1820s. Probable burial of one of Boone County's first Commissioners who, along with four others selected Columbia as the county seat.
Hinkson Creek Cemetery		Columbia; 38°58′49″N 92°16′30″W	Church	Located in the bluffs above the Hinkson Creek Valley in northeast Columbia. Has also been called the Old Hinkson Baptist Cemetery. It is now overgrown and abandoned.
Jewell Cemetery State Historic Site		Columbia; 38°55′11″N 92°20′10″W	Family, State Historic Site	Created by George Jewell for his decedents. Now a Missouri State Historic Site. It was placed on the National Register of Historic Places in 1970. Burial place of William Jewell and Charles Henry Hardin.
Johnson Cemetery		Englewood area 38°49′39″N 92°09′25″W	Family	Very large family cemetery located on Johnson Cemetery Road in far eastern Boone County. Extremely well maintained. A huge grove of ceders stands in the oldest part.
Jones-Little Cemetery		Pierpont area 38°51′27″N 92°20′54″W	Family	Cemetery is northeast of the intersection of High Point Lane and Hill Creek Road. Markers with death dates as early as 1839 still standing. At least a dozen burials maybe more. Also called Jones-Little-Hopper
Lemon Cemetery		Columbia area 38°59′52″N 92°20′54″W	Family	At least seven burials. Also called the Creasy Springs Road Burial Ground.
Lick Fork Cemetery		Sturgeon area 39°12′50″N 92°20′59″W	Church	Cemetery is on Ponderosa Road. Church building no longer stands.
Lientz Cemetery		Rocheport area 39°00′29″N 92°30′19″W	Family	This is the Lientz family cemetery located on Walnut Grove Road. A sign says it was restored in 1990. At that time a marker was placed for one of the first Curators of the University of Missouri. As of 2018 Cemetery is overgrown but stones appear standing.
Little Bethel Cemetery		Midway area 38°58′53″N 92°28′38″W	Family	Also called the Rice Family Cemetery, it is located west of Midway.
Little Bonne Femme Cemetery		Deer Park area 38°52′40″N 92°15′29″W	Church	Next to the Little Bonne Femme Baptist Church, founded in 1819. Woolfolk cemetery markers were moved here.
Locust Grove Cemetery		Midway area 38°59′09″N 92°26′52″W	Church	Cemetery is next to Locust Grove Methodist Church. Contains at least one American Revolutionary War soldier.
Locust Grove Cemetery		Riggs area 39°10′13″N 92°19′09″W	Church	Cemetery is on the grounds of the Locust Grove Baptist Church.
Log Providence Cemetery		Deer Park area 38°50′25″N 92°16′28″W	Church, African-American	Located next to Log Providence Baptist Church, a historic African-American Church in the Three Creeks Area between Columbia and Ashland.
McKimpson-McIntyre Cemetery		Columbia; 38°57′10″N 92°16′37″W	Family	Once on the McIntyre(McIntire) Farm, what's left is now in the woods behind Rebel Hill Trailer Park. In May 2018 no visible headstones remain, although two bases and a fieldstone marked 1865 were uncovered along with visible depressions.
March Cemetery		Harrisburg area 39°07′33″N 92°27′07″W	Family	Located in an orchard, at least three stones present and readable as of 2018.
Memorial Park Cemetery		Columbia; 38°58′07″N 92°21′18″W	Modern	Largest cemetery in Boone County. Burial place of Bud Walton.
Mt. Celestial Cemetery		McBaine area 38°52′34″N 92°25′11″W	Church, African-American	African-American cemetery and church. Steepest cemetery in Boone County. Semi-Abandoned
Mt. Hope Cemetery		Columbia area 39°01′20″N 92°13′53″W	Church, African-American	African-American cemetery, church was torn down and the congregation moved to Columbia. Parts of the cemetery are overgrown in 2018.
Mt. Horeb Cemetery		Sturgeon area 39°12′57″N 92°17′03″W	Church	Used largely by the residents of Sturgeon and vicinity. Located South of the town on VV.
Mt. Nebo Cemetery		Huntsdale area 38°55′25″N 92°27′41″W	Church	Located on Mt. Nebo Church Road
Mt. Pleasant Cemetery		Claysville area 38°41′25″N 92°15′28″W	Church	Located on Mt. Pleasant Road in southern Boone County.
Mt. Zion Cemetery		Hallsville area 39°04′10″N 92°10′46″W	Church	In the vicinity of the church and cemetery was the Civil War Battle of Mount Zion Church. The church and cemetery were placed on the National Register of Historic Places in 2013. Reportedly the highest point in Boone County.
Nashville Cemetery		Easley area 38°49′27″N 92°21′00″W	Church	Located on Nashville Church road and across the street from the church. This is the community of Nashville, Missouri.
Naylor-Schooling Cemetery		Riggs area 39°09′33″N 92°20′10″W	Family, Native America/Cherokee	Also known as Naylor Cherokee Burial Grounds
New Liberty Cemetery		Ashland area 38°46′08″N 92°16′52″W	Church	Large cemetery located across the road from New Liberty Church.
New Providence Cemetery		Columbia area 39°00′26″N 92°24′07″W	Church	Cemetery located next to New Providence Baptist Church.
New Salem Cemetery		Ashland area 38°47′59″N 92°15′10″W	Church	Large cemetery just off U.S. 63 south of Ashland. Surrounds New Salem Baptist Church.
Oakland Cemetery		Prathersville area 39°01′48″N 92°17′36″W	Church	This is the cemetery of Oakland Christian Church, which was established in 1872. It is located on Oakland Church Road.
Oakland Cemetery		Easley area 38°49′06″N 92°18′27″W	Church	This is the cemetery of Oakland Methodist Episcopal Christian Church
Old Gilead Cemetery		Hallsville area 39°04′38″N 92°16′52″W	Church	Cemetery is located down an abandoned road deep in the woods.
Olivet Cemetery		Harg; 38°55′37″N 92°13′47″W	Church	Associated with Olivet Christian Church, it is located at the intersection of WW with Olivet Road.
O'Rear Cemetery		Columbia area 39°00′01″N 92°17′35″W	Family	Cemetery moved from original location under the racetrack of the Boone County Fairgrounds. As of 2018 the area was fenced but no signs are markers were visible.
Palmer Cemetery		Sturgeon area 39°11′30″N 92°16′20″W	Family	Small family plot laid out by Lancelot Palmer stand at the crest of a hill in a cow pasture. Large obelisk and several other markers in various states of repair. Probably less than 10 burials.
Payton Cemetery		Columbia; 38°58′22″N 92°21′26″W	Family	At least five known headstones in a state of disarray, located on City of Columbia Property in Cosmo Park. Also called the Payton-Goodrich-Willis-Shock Cemetery. Totally overgrown with mature invasive Japanese honeysuckle as of 2023. Ironically located feet from the well maintained, and much larger, Memorial Park Cemetery.
Perche Creek Cemetery		Rucker area 39°11′56″N 92°25′23″W	Church	Located on Perche Creek next to Perche Creek Baptist Church.
Prairie Grove Baptist		Shaw; 38°58′27″N 92°12′11″W	Church	Shaw is on the outskirts of Columbia. There are two cemeteries near the Shaw roundabout. This one was affiliated was Prairie Grove Baptist.
Prairie Grove Methodist		Shaw; 38°58′22″N 92°12′11″W	Church	Shaw is on the outskirts of Columbia. There are two cemeteries near the Shaw roundabout. This one was affiliated was Prairie Grove Methodist.
Prewitt Cemetery		Harrisburg; 39°08′27″N 92°27′54″W	Family	Prewitt Cemetery contains about eight burials. It is located west and behind of Harrisburg Elementary School. As of 2018 the Cemetery is fenced and mowed.
Red Rock Cemetery		Perche area 39°06′22″N 92°24′06″W	Church	Cemetery next to Red Rock Methodist Church
Red Top Cemetery		Hallsville; 39°07′12″N 92°14′31″W	Church	This rather large and old cemetery is just west of Hallsville and next to Red Top Christian Church. The church was founded in 1822. Many old markers standing and repaired.
Ridgeway Farm Cemetery		Columbia; 38°57′33″N 92°18′06″W	Family	Headstones are gone. A marker was placed by the Ridgeway family on the Columbia Country Club Golf Course marking the location.
Riggs Union Cemetery		Riggs; 39°10′18″N 92°20′46″W	Church	Established in Riggs next to Riggs Union Church. Today an active United Methodist Church.
Rocheport Cemetery		Rocheport; 38°58′51″N 92°33′32″W	Municipal	On the hill just southeast of Rocheport is a very old and large city cemetery.
Rock Bridge Cemetery		Pierpont; 38°52′08″N 92°18′01″W	African-American	Located next to Rock Bridge Memorial State Park, this cemetery is predominantly African-American.
Rocky Fork Cemetery		Hinton; 39°03′13″N 92°20′28″W	Church	Rocky Fork Cemetery stands next to Rocky Fork Baptist Church. It is named after Rocky Fork Creek
Searcy Cemetery		Hinton area 39°04′47″N 92°21′20″W	Family	At least four burials, including John Connelly, a veteran of the American Revolutionary War.
Sims Cemetery		Riggs area 39°09′47″N 92°21′56″W	Family and Church	Established on the homestead of Abram Sims. Also known as Mt. Carmel, the name of the Church.
Spence Cemetery		Columbia; 38°59′18″N 92°18′01″W	Family	Located in North Columbia on Wayside Drive. Also known as the Old Spence Burial Grounds
Sprinkle Cemetery		Columbia; 38°55′56″N 92°23′08″W	Family	Located at 1907 Chapel Ridge Road in the front of a residence. Fenced.
Sturgeon Cemetery		Sturgeon; 39°13′59″N 92°17′38″W	Municipal	Cemetery for the city of Sturgeon, Missouri, located west of the city.
Sugar Creek Cemetery		Columbia area 38°56′44″N 92°28′19″W	Church	This cemetery is located on Hickory School Road, there was formerly a church associated, now no longer present.
Tuttle Cemetery		Columbia; 38°54′09″N 92°22′54″W	Family	Located in extreme Southwest Columbia. At least six burials
Union Cemetery		Columbia; 38°52′43″N 92°22′59″W	Church	This Cemetery is located at a bend in Sinclair Road near Arrowhead Lake. Also known as "Old Union" and "Union South" the church was established in 1822. Not to be confused with several other Union Cemeteries in Boone County.
Union Cemetery		Centralia area 39°10′31″N 92°09′49″W	Church	On Union Church Road. The Church is no longer standing.
Valley Springs Cemetery		Columbia area 38°56′55″N 92°26′34″W	Church	Located just east of Route UU south of Midway.
Wade-Shock Cemetery		Columbia area 39°01′06″N 92°22′07″W	Family	Also called the Sycamore Hills Cemetery or just the Wade Cemetery. Located in the backyard of a house at the northwest corner of the intersection of Fenton and Sycamore Hills Road. Some markers have been moved, buried, or lost.
Waltnut Grove Cemetery		Rocheport area 39°00′46″N 92°31′24″W	Church	On the grounds of the former Walnut Missionary Baptist Church. There are an unusual amount of old standing markers.
Woodcrest Cemetery		Ashland; 38°46′15″N 92°15′32″W	Church	On Henry Clay Boulevard in south Ashland.
Woolfolk Cemetery		Deer Park area 38°52′41″N 92°15′27″W	Family (original), Church (relocated)	This cemetery was originally located northeast of Deer Park. Four headstones and four footstones were moved to Little Bonne Femme Cemetery, including the marker for John Woolfolk, a soldier of the American Revolution.
Wright (Fletcher) Cemetery		Wilton area 38°45′46″N 92°22′35″W	Family	The Fletcher Wright Cemetery consist of four known burials deep in the woods near Wilton, Missouri.

== Undocumented cemeteries ==
Many cemeteries have been completely or partially destroyed sometimes by mistake but often intentionally. Markers, burials, and sometimes whole cemeteries have been moved. Others have been lost to time and locations forgotten or unknown. Small family plots, often with less than ten burials, are mostly commonly lost.

Name	Image	Location	Type	Description
Acton Cemetery			Family	
Bear Creek Cemetery		Columbia	Church	Bear Creek Church was organized in 1824 named for the creek along which its founding members lived. Possibly in subdivision.
Beazeley Cemetery		Pierpont area	Family	
Berry Cemetery		Columbia	Family	Originally located in the Corporate Lake Development. 5 graves were moved to the Bethel Cemetery nearby.
Blythe Cemetery		Claysville area	Family	At least three burials
Boone County Poor Farm Cemetery		Columbia		This burial ground was for indignant patients at the Boone County Poor Farm. Possibly part of Columbia Cemetery
Brushwood Cemetery		Columbia	Family	East of and nearby Brushwood Lake, at least three burials
Brushwood Cemetery		Huntsdale area	Family	Unknown number of burials
Burnett Cemetery		Ashland area	Family	Also called the Burnett Family Burial Grounds
Carr Cemetery		Rileysburg area	Family	
Cave Cemetery		Columbia	Family	Located on land next to the municipal power plant on business loop. Possibly unmarked.
Cave Cemetery		Columbia	Family	At least two burials, stones destroyed.
Clardy Cemetery		Claysville area	Family	
Claysville Cemetery		Claysville area	Municipal	Possibly unmarked
Conley Cemetery			Family	At least three Conley family member buried here.
Country Hill Cemetery		Columbia		Located near the subdivision of the same name on south Scott Boulevard. Possibly unmarked
Cowan Cemetery		Columbia	Family	Near the Columbia Terminal Railroad, at least sixteen burials.
Crosswhite Cemetery		Finger Lakes State Park	Family	Cemetery has been cleared and fenced, stones are displayed in the guard house. Sometimes misspelled as Crosthwaite.
Fountain Cemetery #2			Family	
German Cemetery		Midway area	Church	At least two burials listed in Tombstone Records of Boone County, Missouri.
Gordon Cemetery		Columbia	Family	Cemetery stood on the Gordon family farm near their mansion and cabin. There is a marker in Stephens Lake Park.
Gibbs Cemetery			Family	At least three burials
Gibson Cemetery			Family	Located on the old David Shock Farm. At least two Gibson burials
Gillaspie Cemetery		Harg area	Family	
Grant Cemetery		Easley area	Family	At least two Grant family burials
Grant Cemetery		Columbia	Family	Southeast of the intersection of Stadium and Broadway. Tombstones missing.
Hoffman Cemetery		Hinton area	Family	Near Rocky Fork Conservation Area Lake, possibly extinct
Jacobs Cemetery		Columbia	Family	Located in what is now a residential neighborhood in east Columbia
Kemper Cemetery			Family	At least four burials, on Poter Kemper Jr. farm
King Cemetery		Columbia	Family	Located on North Stadium near the municipal golf course. Possibly relocated.
Kirtley Cemetery			Family	At least five burials
Mars Cemetery			Family	At least two of the Mars family buried here
Maupin Cemetery		Columbia	Family	Once at least 20 gravestones. May have been associated with the David Guitar House. Reportedly destroyed by developer.
McGuire Cemetery			Family	At least seven burials
Mt. Moriah Cemetery		Columbia area	Church	Northeast Columbia off HH and Hinkson Creek. Located on the old Mt. Moriah camp grounds. In extreme state of abandonment.
O'Rear Cemetery			Family	Two miles east of Brown's Station
Old Rocky Fork Cemetery		Columbia area	Church	Original location of Rocky Fork Church. Only a few stones remain identifiable. Also called Wingo Cemetery
Palmer Cemetery		Sturgeon area	Family	Laid out by James Palmer. Many other Palmers buried here. Around twenty burials.
Pemberton Cemetery			Family	Near cedar creek, at least six burials
Phillips Cemetery			Family	At least nine Phillips buried here
Phillips Cemetery			Family	At least eight Phillips buried here
Pleasant Grove		Centralia area	Church	Pleasant Grove is now in the middle of fields, many markers. Church no longer there.
Points Cemetery			Family	Near Mt. Zion Church, at least one burial
Pollard Cemetery			Family	
Reems Cemetery			Family	Located northeast of Grandview Church near the Callaway County line.
Renfro Cemetery			Family	At least three Renfro burials here
Ridgeway Cemetery		Brown's Station area	Family	At least six burials, located a half mile east of Brown's Station
Robinson Cemetery			Family	laid out in 1849 by Tandy Robinson, about twenty burials
Robinson Cemetery			Family	Only one tombstone recorded, others members of Robinson and McClain families are buried here
Samuel Cemetery			Family	
Sapp Cemetery		Ashland area	Family	South of Ashland
Sexton Cemetery		Columbia area	Family	Contains the burial of Boone County pioneer George Sexton and family, also contains an American Revolutionary War veteran. Near the former location of Sexton's Tavern along the Boone's Lick Road.
Shock Cemetery			Family	At least four burials
Smith Cemetery		Columbia	Family	Located near Chapel Hill and Fairview, possibly unmarked, possibly moved. Also known as George Smith burial.
Snell-Stone Cemetery			Family	At least four burials here
Starke Cemetery			Family	At least two Starke burials here
Stephens Cemetery			Family	At least twelve burials here. Near the Callaway County line
Stewart Cemetery		Columbia	Family	Near Scott Boulevard and Chapel Hill Road, where Southwest manor subdivision is. Reportedly destroyed.
Talbott Cemetery			Family	At least two burials here, including a veteran of the War of 1812
Taylor Cemetery		Ashland area	Family	At least three burials
Taylor Cemetery			Family	At least one burial. Located at an old farm on Sexton Road
Toalson Cemetery			Family	At least three Toalsons buried here
Turner Cemetery		Columbia	Family	Off Scott Boulevard near the MKT Trail and Hinkson Creek. Formerly there was a train stop at this location known as Turner. At least three burials here
Turner Cemetery			Family	At least two Turners and two Williams buried here
Turner Cemetery			Family	At least three burials here, located a mile and a half south of Olivet Church
Turner Cemetery			Family	On Old Mexico Road, east of Columbia. At least eight burials
Turner Cemetery			Family	On Old Rocheport Road west of Columbia, at least two Turner burials
Vaughn Cemetery			Family	
Wade Cemetery			Family	At least five burials
Waters Cemetery		Columbia	Family	Located near Lenoir retirement home near U.S. 63 in south Columbia. Possibly relocated.
White-Robertson		Columbia area	Family	Located by Bobcat of St. Louis-Columbia north of I-70
Wigginton Cemetery			Family	Located east of Mt. Zion Church. At least two Wigginton family burials
Williams Cemetery			Family	One of two William Family cemeteries
Williams Cemetery		Hallsville area	Family	Possibly in Finger Lakes State Park. On former Peabody Coal Company land.
Wingo Cemetery				Also called Old Rocky Fork
Winn			Family	One of two Winn Family cemeteries
Winn			Family	One of two Winn cemeteries
Winterbower Cemetery		Oldham area	Family	Located near Mark Twain National Forest. At least eight burials.
Woodlandville Cemetery				
Woods Cemetery			Family	
Wood Family Cemetery			Family	
Wright Cemetery			Family	At least twenty five burials
Yager Cemetery			Family	
Yahweh's Assembly in Messiah Cemetery		Rocheport area	Church	Small newer cemetery with four burials.
Younger Cemetery			Family	

== See also ==
- National Register of Historic Places listings in Boone County, Missouri
- Boone County Historical Society
