= National Register of Historic Places listings in Boone County, Missouri =

Location of Boone County in Missouri

This is a list of the National Register of Historic Places listings in Boone County, Missouri.

This is intended to be a complete list of the properties and districts on the National Register of Historic Places in Boone County, Missouri, United States. Latitude and longitude coordinates are provided for many National Register properties and districts; these locations may be seen together in a map.

There are 51 properties and districts listed on the National Register in the county, including 1 National Historic Landmark.

This National Park Service list is complete through NPS recent listings posted April 24, 2026.

== Current listings ==
| | Name on the Register | Image | Date listed | Location | City or town | Description |
|---|---|---|---|---|---|---|
| 1 | Ballenger Building | Ballenger Building | January 21, 2004 (#03001474) | 27-29 South Ninth St. 38°57′02″N 92°19′40″W | Columbia | |
| 2 | Bond's Chapel Methodist Episcopal Church | Bond's Chapel Methodist Episcopal Church | September 9, 1993 (#93000940) | MO A, 2.5 miles (4.0 km) northeast of Hartsburg; 38°42′34″N 92°17′08″W | Hartsburg | |
| 3 | John W. Boone House | John W. Boone House | September 4, 1980 (#80002309) | 4th St. between E. Broadway and Walnut; 38°57′08″N 92°19′57″W | Columbia | |
| 4 | Central Dairy Building | Central Dairy Building | January 20, 2005 (#04001519) | 1104-1106 East Broadway; 38°57′05″N 92°19′30″W | Columbia | |
| 5 | Albert Bishop Chance House and Gardens | Albert Bishop Chance House and Gardens | July 3, 1979 (#79001345) | 319 E. Sneed St. 39°12′36″N 92°08′04″W | Centralia | |
| 6 | Chatol | Chatol | April 20, 1979 (#79001346) | 543 S. Jefferson St. 39°12′17″N 92°08′06″W | Centralia | |
| 7 | Coca-Cola Bottling Company Building | Coca-Cola Bottling Company Building | February 14, 2006 (#06000043) | 10 Hitt St. 38°57′03″N 92°19′30″W | Columbia | |
| 8 | Columbia Cemetery | Columbia Cemetery | February 1, 2007 (#06001335) | 30 East Broadway; 38°56′56″N 92°20′13″W | Columbia | |
| 9 | Columbia National Guard Armory | Columbia National Guard Armory | March 25, 1993 (#93000197) | 701 E. Ash St. 38°57′14″N 92°19′45″W | Columbia | |
| 10 | Sanford F. Conley House | Sanford F. Conley House | December 18, 1973 (#73001035) | 602 Sanford Pl. 38°56′39″N 92°19′52″W | Columbia | |
| 11 | Fred Douglass School | Fred Douglass School | September 4, 1980 (#80002310) | 310 N. Providence Rd. 38°57′18″N 92°19′59″W | Columbia | |
| 12 | Downtown Columbia Historic District | Downtown Columbia Historic District | November 8, 2006 (#06000990) | Parts of 7th, 8th, 9th, 10th, E. Broadway, Cherry, Hitt, Locust, and E. Walnut Sts.; also 1019, 1020, 1023, and 1025-33 E. Walnut St. 38°57′05″N 92°19′39″W | Columbia | Addresses along E. Walnut St. represent a boundary increase of May 8, 2008 |
| 13 | East Campus Neighborhood Historic District | East Campus Neighborhood Historic District | February 16, 1996 (#96000019) | Roughly bounded by Bouchelle, College, University and High Sts. including parts of Willis, Bass, Dorsey and Anthony Sts. 38°56′44″N 92°19′07″W | Columbia | |
| 14 | Eighth and Broadway Historic District | Eighth and Broadway Historic District | April 22, 2003 (#03000298) | 800-810 E. Broadway Blvd. 38°57′04″N 92°19′42″W | Columbia | The contributing properties include the Miller Building, Matthews Hardware, and Metropolitan Building. |
| 15 | Samuel H. and Isabel Smith Elkins House | Samuel H. and Isabel Smith Elkins House | September 12, 1996 (#96001012) | 315 N. 10th St. 38°57′20″N 92°19′36″W | Columbia | |
| 16 | First Christian Church | First Christian Church | October 29, 1991 (#91001590) | 101 N. Tenth St. 38°57′10″N 92°19′36″W | Columbia | |
| 17 | Francis Quadrangle Historic District | Francis Quadrangle Historic District | December 18, 1973 (#73001036) | Bounded by Conley Ave. and Elm, 6th, and 9th Sts. 38°56′46″N 92°19′44″W | Columbia | |
| 18 | Frederick Apartments | Frederick Apartments | April 16, 2013 (#13000172) | 1001 University Avenue; 38°56′48″N 92°19′34″W | Columbia | |
| 19 | David Gordon House and Collins Log Cabin | David Gordon House and Collins Log Cabin | August 29, 1983 (#83000972) | 2100 E. Broadway; 38°54′24″N 92°17′41″W | Columbia | |
| 20 | Gordon Tract Archeological Site | Gordon Tract Archeological Site | March 16, 1972 (#72000705) | Address Restricted | Columbia | |
| 21 | Greenwood | Greenwood | January 15, 1979 (#79001347) | 3005 Mexico Gravel Rd. 38°58′47″N 92°17′32″W | Columbia | |
| 22 | David Guitar House | David Guitar House | September 9, 1993 (#93000939) | 2815 Oakland Gravel Rd. 38°58′47″N 92°18′16″W | Columbia | |
| 23 | Samuel E. Hackman Building | Samuel E. Hackman Building | December 10, 1998 (#98001501) | 30 S. Second St. 38°41′41″N 92°18′31″W | Hartsburg | |
| 24 | Hamilton-Brown Shoe Factory | Hamilton-Brown Shoe Factory | July 19, 2002 (#02000791) | 1123 Wilkes Blvd. 38°57′38″N 92°19′22″W | Columbia | |
| 25 | Harrisburg School--Ancient Landmark Masonic Lodge Number 356 A.F. & A.M. | Harrisburg School--Ancient Landmark Masonic Lodge Number 356 A.F. & A.M. | December 24, 2013 (#13000970) | 140 S. Harris St. 39°08′28″N 92°27′43″W | Harrisburg | |
| 26 | William B. Hunt House | William B. Hunt House | January 9, 1997 (#96001567) | 8939 W. Terrapin Hills Rd. 38°55′09″N 92°28′27″W | Columbia | |
| 27 | Kress Building | Kress Building | March 9, 2005 (#05000122) | 1025 E. Broadway; 38°57′07″N 92°19′32″W | Columbia | |
| 28 | Maplewood | Maplewood | April 13, 1979 (#79001348) | Nifong Blvd. and Ponderosa Dr. 38°54′29″N 92°17′43″W | Columbia | |
| 29 | McCain Furniture Store | McCain Furniture Store | August 17, 2005 (#05000890) | 916 E. Walnut; 38°57′09″N 92°19′37″W | Columbia | |
| 30 | Missouri State Teachers Association Building | Missouri State Teachers Association Building | September 4, 1980 (#80002311) | 407 S. 6th St. 38°56′50″N 92°19′53″W | Columbia | |
| 31 | Missouri Theater | Missouri Theater | June 6, 1979 (#79001349) | 201-215 S. 9th St. 38°56′57″N 92°19′39″W | Columbia | |
| 32 | Missouri United Methodist Church | Missouri United Methodist Church | September 4, 1980 (#80002312) | 204 S. 9th St. 38°56′57″N 92°19′37″W | Columbia | |
| 33 | Missouri, Kansas, and Texas Railroad Depot | Missouri, Kansas, and Texas Railroad Depot | January 29, 1979 (#79001350) | 402 E. Broadway; 38°57′05″N 92°19′58″W | Columbia | |
| 34 | Mount Zion Church and Cemetery | Mount Zion Church and Cemetery | January 14, 2013 (#12001177) | 11070 Mount Zion Rd. 39°04′09″N 92°10′44″W | Hallsville | |
| 35 | North Ninth Street Historic District | North Ninth Street Historic District | January 21, 2004 (#03001473) | 5-36 North Ninth St. 38°57′07″N 92°19′39″W | Columbia | |
| 36 | Moses U. Payne House | Moses U. Payne House | October 7, 1994 (#94001204) | 201 N. Roby Farm Rd. 38°57′45″N 92°31′53″W | Rocheport | |
| 37 | Pierce Pennant Motor Hotel | Pierce Pennant Motor Hotel | September 2, 1982 (#82003125) | 1406 Old US 40W; 38°58′02″N 92°21′32″W | Columbia | |
| 38 | Rocheport | Rocheport | October 8, 1976 (#76001108) | MO 240; 38°58′43″N 92°33′49″W | Rocheport | |
| 39 | St. Paul A.M.E. Church | St. Paul A.M.E. Church | September 4, 1980 (#80002315) | 5th and Park Sts. 38°57′17″N 92°19′54″W | Columbia | |
| 40 | Sanborn Field and Soil Erosion Plots | Sanborn Field and Soil Erosion Plots | October 15, 1966 (#66000413) | University of Missouri campus 38°56′33″N 92°19′14″W | Columbia | |
| 41 | Second Baptist Church | Second Baptist Church | September 4, 1980 (#80002313) | 4th St. and Broadway; 38°57′07″N 92°19′58″W | Columbia | |
| 42 | Second Christian Church | Second Christian Church | September 4, 1980 (#80002314) | 401 N. 5th 38°57′20″N 92°19′55″W | Columbia | |
| 43 | Senior Hall | Senior Hall | August 2, 1977 (#77000799) | Stephens College campus 38°57′01″N 92°19′23″W | Columbia | |
| 44 | Sigma Alpha Epsilon Building | Sigma Alpha Epsilon Building | October 20, 2014 (#14000870) | 24 E. Stewart Rd. 38°56′47″N 92°20′12″W | Columbia | |
| 45 | Stephens College South Campus Historic District | Stephens College South Campus Historic District | November 25, 2005 (#05001326) | 1200 E. Broadway; 38°57′03″N 92°19′22″W | Columbia | |
| 46 | John N. and Elizabeth Taylor House | John N. and Elizabeth Taylor House | May 25, 2001 (#01000546) | 716 W Broadway; 38°57′04″N 92°20′57″W | Columbia | |
| 47 | Tiger Hotel | Tiger Hotel | February 29, 1980 (#80002316) | 23 S. 8th St. 38°57′03″N 92°19′44″W | Columbia | |
| 48 | Virginia Building | Virginia Building | March 13, 2002 (#02000163) | 111 S. Ninth St. 38°57′01″N 92°19′40″W | Columbia | |
| 49 | Wabash Railroad Station and Freight House | Wabash Railroad Station and Freight House | October 11, 1979 (#79001351) | 126 N. 10th St. 38°57′12″N 92°19′34″W | Columbia | |
| 50 | West Broadway Historic District | West Broadway Historic District | April 27, 2010 (#10000221) | 300-922 W. Broadway (except 800, 808, 812); 38°57′06″N 92°20′51″W | Columbia | |
| 51 | Wright Brothers Mule Barn | Wright Brothers Mule Barn | November 1, 2007 (#07001119) | 1101-1107 Hinkson Ave. & 501-507 Fay St. 38°57′26″N 92°19′22″W | Columbia | |

== See also ==
- Boone County Historical Society
- List of cemeteries in Boone County, Missouri
- List of National Historic Landmarks in Missouri
- National Register of Historic Places listings in Missouri
