= Three Creeks Township, Boone County, Missouri =

Three Creeks Township
- Township
- Interactive map of Three Creeks Township
- Coordinates: 38°48′55″N 92°15′44″W
- Country: United States
- State: Missouri
- County: Boone
- Area code: 573
- GNIS Feature ID: 2045045

Three Creeks Township is one of ten townships in Boone County, Missouri, USA. The township's contains part of the city of Ashland and also a part of the village of Pierpont.

== History ==
Settled mainly by settlers from the upland south (Kentucky, Virginia, and Tennessee), the township was named the three major creeks draining it: Boone Femme, Turkey, and Bass Creeks. Much of the area was too hilly for agriculture and was settled by freed slaves after the civil war. The Columbia Regional Airport is located on former prairie east of U.S. Highway 63.

== Geography ==
Three Creeks Township spans Boone County east to west and just located above Cedar Township The only incorporated settlements: Ashland and Pierpont. The unincorporated communities of Deer Park and Englewood are also within the bounds. The area like Rock Bridge to the north abounds with Karst Features. Hunters Cave drains a portion of Bass Creek.

== See also ==
- Three Creeks Conservation Area
