= Cedar Township, Boone County, Missouri =

Cedar Township
- Township
- Interactive map of Cedar Township
- Coordinates: 38°43′00″N 92°16′40″W
- Country: United States
- State: Missouri
- County: Boone

Area
  - Total: 196.0 sq mi (508 km^{2})
  - Land: 192.6 sq mi (499 km^{2})
  - Water: 3.4 sq mi (8.8 km^{2})

Population (2012)
  - Total: 4,190
  - Density: 21.8/sq mi (8.40/km^{2})
- Area code: 573
- GNIS Feature ID: 766330

Cedar Township is the southernmost of ten townships in Boone County, Missouri, USA. As of the 2012, its population was 4,190. The township's major cities include the river town of Hartsburg and part of the prairie town Ashland.

== History ==
Cedar Township was established in 1821. The township was named after Cedar Creek. The boundaries of the township have changed over time—for example, the most recently from the creation of the newer Three Creeks and Rock Bridge townships from the northern sector of what was before a much larger historic Cedar Township... see maps linked below.

== Geography ==
Cedar Township covers an area of 196 square miles (510 km^{2}) and is located in the extreme south of Boone County between the Missouri River and Cedar Creek. The township contains two incorporated settlements: all of Hartsburg and part of Ashland. The unincorporated communities of Claysville and Wilton are also within the bounds. There are at least three major cemeteries located within its bounds: Friendens, Goshen, and Mount Pleasant. The Missouri River, Hart Creek, Jemerson Creek, and Cedar Creek all flow through the township. The Hart Creek Conservation Area and part of the Mark Twain National Forest are also located there. A map showing the boundaries of Boone County's townships can be found in the Reference/Links section below.
