= Lick Fork =

Stream in the U.S. state of Missouri

Coordinates: 39.1267052°N 92.4101806°W

Lick Fork is a stream in Boone and Randolph County in the U.S. state of Missouri. It is a tributary of Perche Creek.

Lick Fork was named for the mineral licks in the area.

== See also ==
- List of rivers of Missouri
