= Columbia metropolitan area, Missouri =

Metropolitan area in Missouri, United States

Columbia, Missouri Columbia-Jefferson City-Moberly, MO CSA
- Metropolitan Statistical Area
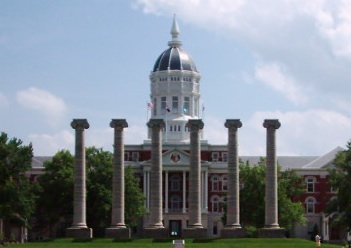
- Jesse Hall at the University of Missouri

- Location in Missouri; 38°57′06″N 92°19′43″W
- Country: United States
- State: Missouri
- Largest city: (Columbia, Missouri) Columbia
- Other cities: List: Jefferson City, Missouri; Moberly, Missouri; Mexico, Missouri; Boonville, Missouri
- Counties: List: In CSA: Boone County, Missouri; Audrain County, Missouri; Randolph County, Missouri; Cooper County, Missouri; Howard County, Missouri; Cole County, Missouri; Callaway County, Missouri; Moniteau County, Missouri; Osage County, Missouri

Population (2022)
  - MSA: 214,630 (216th)
  - CSA: 414,036 (102nd)
- Time zone: UTC−6 (CST)
  - Summer (DST): UTC−5 (CDT)
- Area codes: 573, 660

The Columbia metropolitan area is the region centered around the City of Columbia in the U.S. state of Missouri. Located in Mid-Missouri, it consists of three counties: Boone, Cooper, and Howard. The population was estimated at 219,062 in 2025, making it the 4th largest metropolitan area in Missouri. Columbia is home to the University of Missouri, and is Missouri's fourth most-populous city with an estimated 130,851 residents as of 2025. Other significant cities in the area include Moberly, Mexico, Boonville, Vandalia, Centralia, and Fayette. The Columbia metropolitan area is part of the broader Columbia–Jefferson City–Moberly combined statistical area with 420,815 residents as of 2025.

The area was originally called the Boonslick and settled mainly by Kentuckians following the Boone's Lick Road starting around 1812. The town of Franklin, now washed into the Missouri River, was an early commercial center and start of the Santa Fe Trail. Columbia was founded as county seat of Boone County in 1821. The region was considered for the location of the Missouri State Capitol, but eventually a site was chosen 30 miles (48 km) south of Columbia and Jefferson City was created to serve that purpose. Today, Interstate 70, and U.S. Highways 63, 54, 24, and 40 link the urban areas.

== Definitions ==
=== Metropolitan Statistical Area ===
The Columbia, MO Metropolitan Statistical Area, as defined by the Office of Management and Budget, is an area consisting of three counties in Mid-Missouri. The MSA had an estimated population of 219,062 as of 2025.

County	Seat	2025 estimate	2020 census	Change	Area	Density
Boone	Columbia	191,746	183,610	+4.43%	691 sq mi (1,790 km^{2})	277/sq mi (107/km^{2})
Cooper	Boonville	17,136	17,103	+0.19%	569 sq mi (1,470 km^{2})	30/sq mi (12/km^{2})
Howard	Fayette	10,180	10,151	+0.29%	472 sq mi (1,220 km^{2})	22/sq mi (8/km^{2})
Total		219,062	210,864	+3.89%	1,732 sq mi (4,490 km^{2})	126/sq mi (49/km^{2})

=== Combined Statistical Area ===
The Columbia–Jefferson City–Moberly, MO Combined Statistical Area is an area made up of nine counties in Mid-Missouri. The statistical area includes the Columbia and Jefferson City metropolitan areas, as well as the Mexico and Moberly micropolitan areas.

Statistical Area	2025 Estimate	2020 Census	Change	Area	Density
Columbia, MO Metropolitan Statistical Area	219,062	210,864	+3.89%	1,732 sq mi (4,490 km^{2})	126/sq mi (49/km^{2})
Jefferson City, MO Metropolitan Statistical Area	152,712	150,309	+1.60%	2,279 sq mi (5,900 km^{2})	67/sq mi (26/km^{2})
Mexico, MO Micropolitan Statistical Area	24,528	24,962	−1.74%	697 sq mi (1,810 km^{2})	35/sq mi (14/km^{2})
Moberly, MO Micropolitan Statistical Area	24,513	24,716	−0.82%	488 sq mi (1,260 km^{2})	50/sq mi (19/km^{2})
Total	420,815	410,851	+2.43%	5,196 sq mi (13,460 km^{2})	81/sq mi (31/km^{2})

Historical population
Census	Pop.	Note	%±
1970	106,204		—
1980	125,027		17.7%
1990	136,845		9.5%
2000	162,336		18.6%
2010	190,387		17.3%
2020	210,864		10.8%
2025 (est.)	219,062		3.9%
U.S. Decennial Census

== Communities ==
The following are cities, towns, and villages in the Columbia, MO Metropolitan Statistical Area categorized based on the United States Census Bureau 2025 population estimates. No population estimates are released for census-designated places (CDPs), which are marked with an asterisk (*). These places are categorized based on their 2020 Census population.

=== Places with more than 100,000 inhabitants ===
- Columbia (Principal city) (130,851)

=== Places with 1,000 to 100,000 inhabitants ===
- Boonville (7,867)
- Ashland (5,221)
- Centralia (partial) (4,767)
- Fayette (2,848)
- Hallsville (1,742)
- Glasgow (partial) (1,080)
- New Franklin (1,026)

=== Places with fewer than 1,000 inhabitants ===
- Sturgeon (957)
- Pilot Grove (693)
- Otterville (450)
- Windsor Place (361)
- Bunceton (338)
- Harrisburg (289)
- Prairie Home (268)
- Armstrong (241)
- Clark (partial) (237)
- Rocheport (211)
- Blackwater (192)
- Hartsburg (137)
- Pierpont (68)
- Franklin (67)
- Huntsdale (30)
- Wooldridge (27)
- McBaine (16)

=== Unincorporated places ===
- Midway
- Shaw
- Two Mile Prairie

== Demographics ==
As of the census of 2000, there were 145,666 people, 56,930 households, and 34,010 families residing within the MSA. The racial makeup of the MSA was 85.83% White, 8.42% African American, 0.41% Native American, 2.76% Asian, 0.03% Pacific Islander, 0.67% from other races, and 1.87% from two or more races. Hispanic or Latino of any race were 1.72% of the population.

The median income for a household in the MSA was $34,550, and the median income for a family was $45,689. Males had a median income of $29,837 versus $22,970 for females. The per capita income for the MSA was $17,521.

== See also ==
- Missouri census statistical areas
- List of cities in Missouri
- List of villages in Missouri
