= Columbia metropolitan area =

Columbia metropolitan area or Greater Columbia can refer to:

- Columbia, Missouri metropolitan area
- Columbia metropolitan area, South Carolina
