= Jewell Cemetery State Historic Site =

Historic Cemetery in Columbia, Boone County, Missouri, US

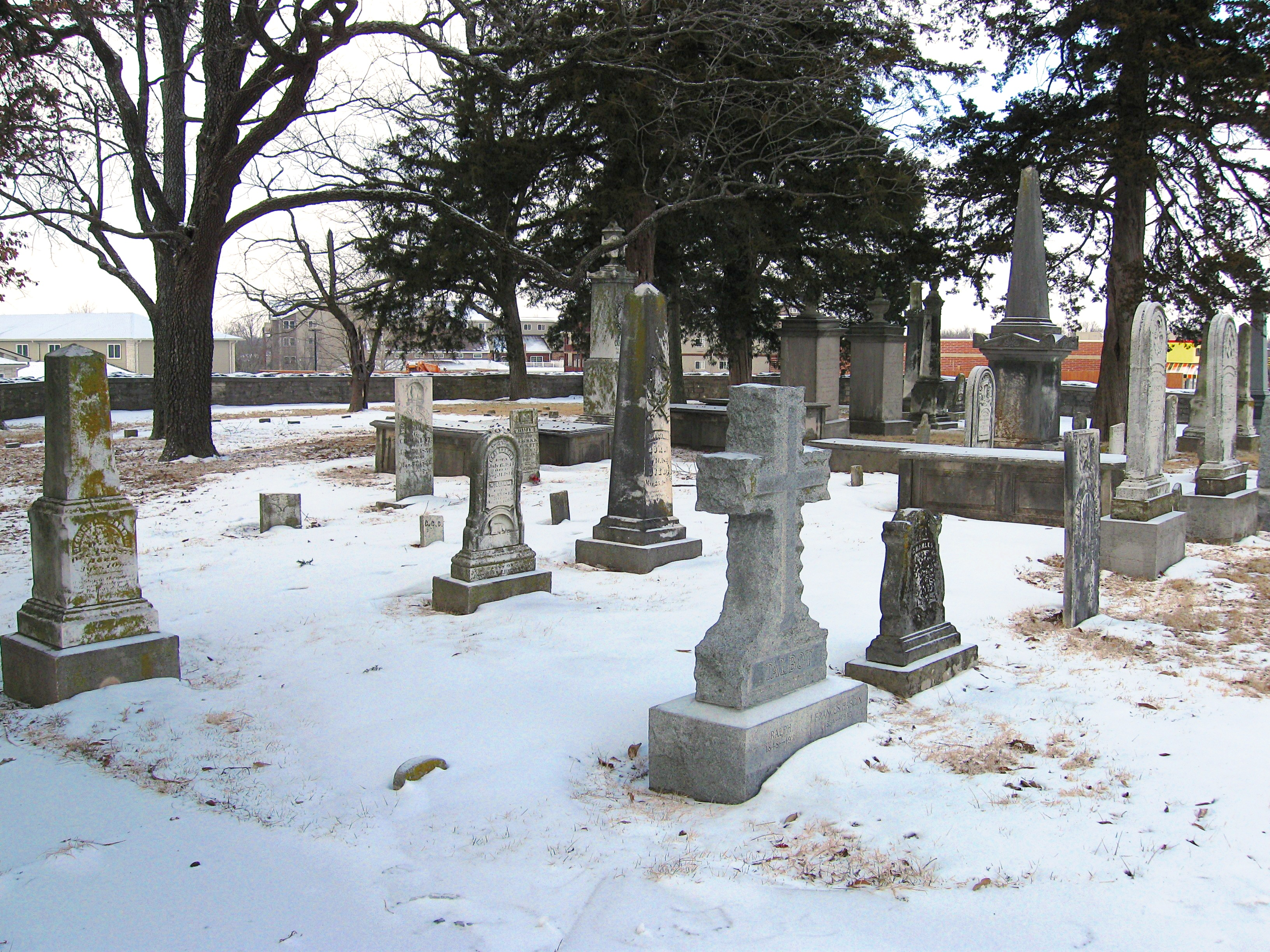

- Location within Missouri Location within the United States
- Location: Columbia, Missouri, United States
- Coordinates: 38°55′11″N 92°20′10″W
- Area: 0.45 acres (0.18 ha)
- Established: 1970
- Visitors: 4,296 (in 2022)
- Operator: Missouri Department of Natural Resources
- Website: Jewell Cemetery State Historic Site

Jewell Cemetery State Historic Site is a publicly owned property in Columbia, Missouri, United States. It is maintained as a state historic site by the Missouri Department of Natural Resources. Among the notable persons buried in the cemetery, which holds the remains of more than 40 descendants of George A. Jewell, are Missouri governor Charles Henry Hardin and the educator William Jewell. The property became part of the state parks system in 1970.

== See also ==
- Columbia Cemetery
- List of cemeteries in Boone County, Missouri
