= Rucker, Missouri =

Unincorporated community in Missouri, US

Coordinates: 39°13′53″N 92°24′49″W

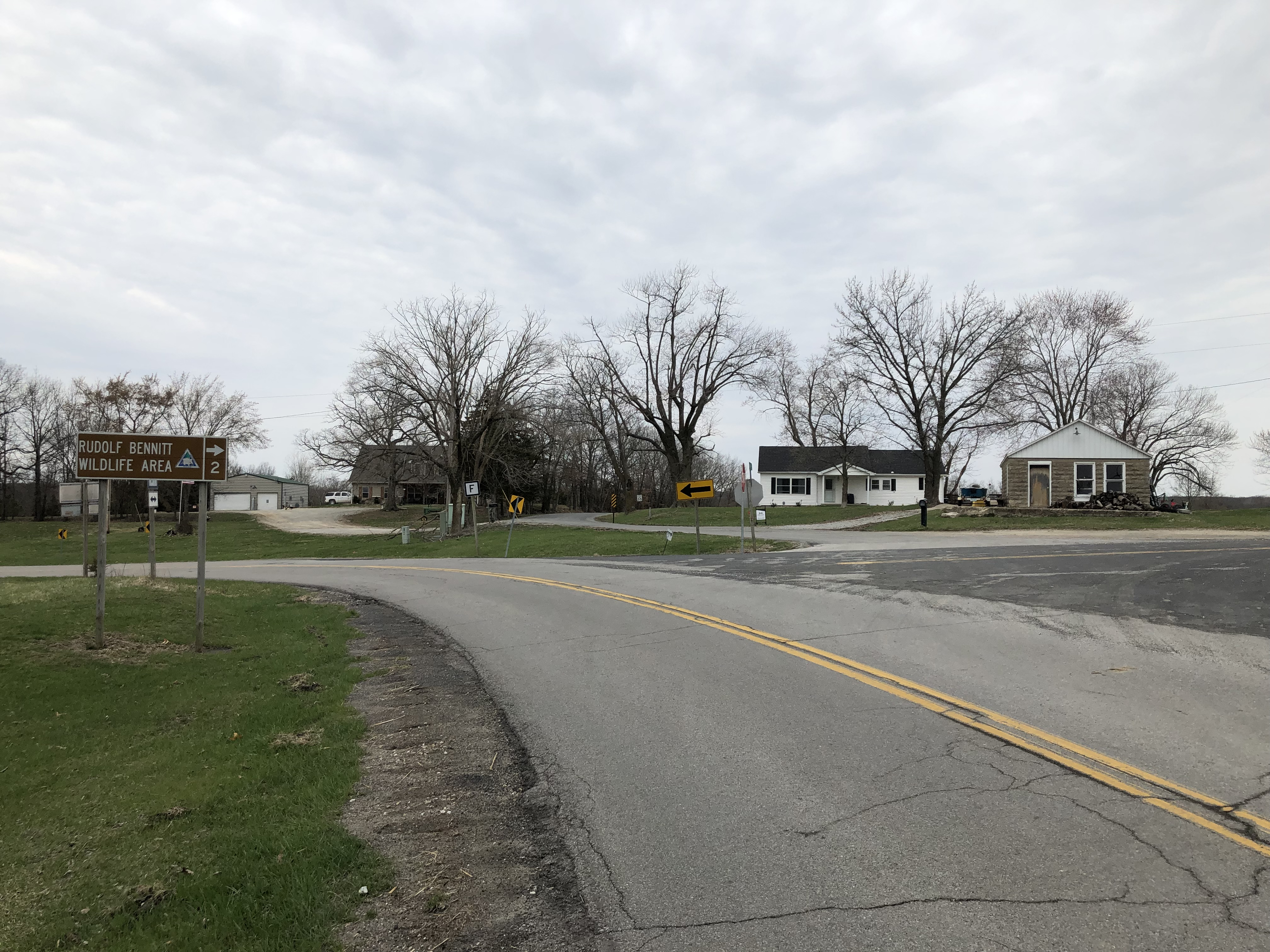
Rucker in April 2019

Rucker is an unincorporated community in the northwest corner of Boone County, Missouri, United States. The community is located at the intersection of Missouri routes T and F about 6.5 miles north of Harrisburg. The site lies between Perche Creek and Sugar Creek.

== History ==
A post office called Rucker was established in 1889, and remained in operation until 1908. The community was named for Maj. John F. Rucker.
