= Bond's Chapel Methodist Episcopal Church =

Historic church in Missouri, United States

- U.S. National Register of Historic Places
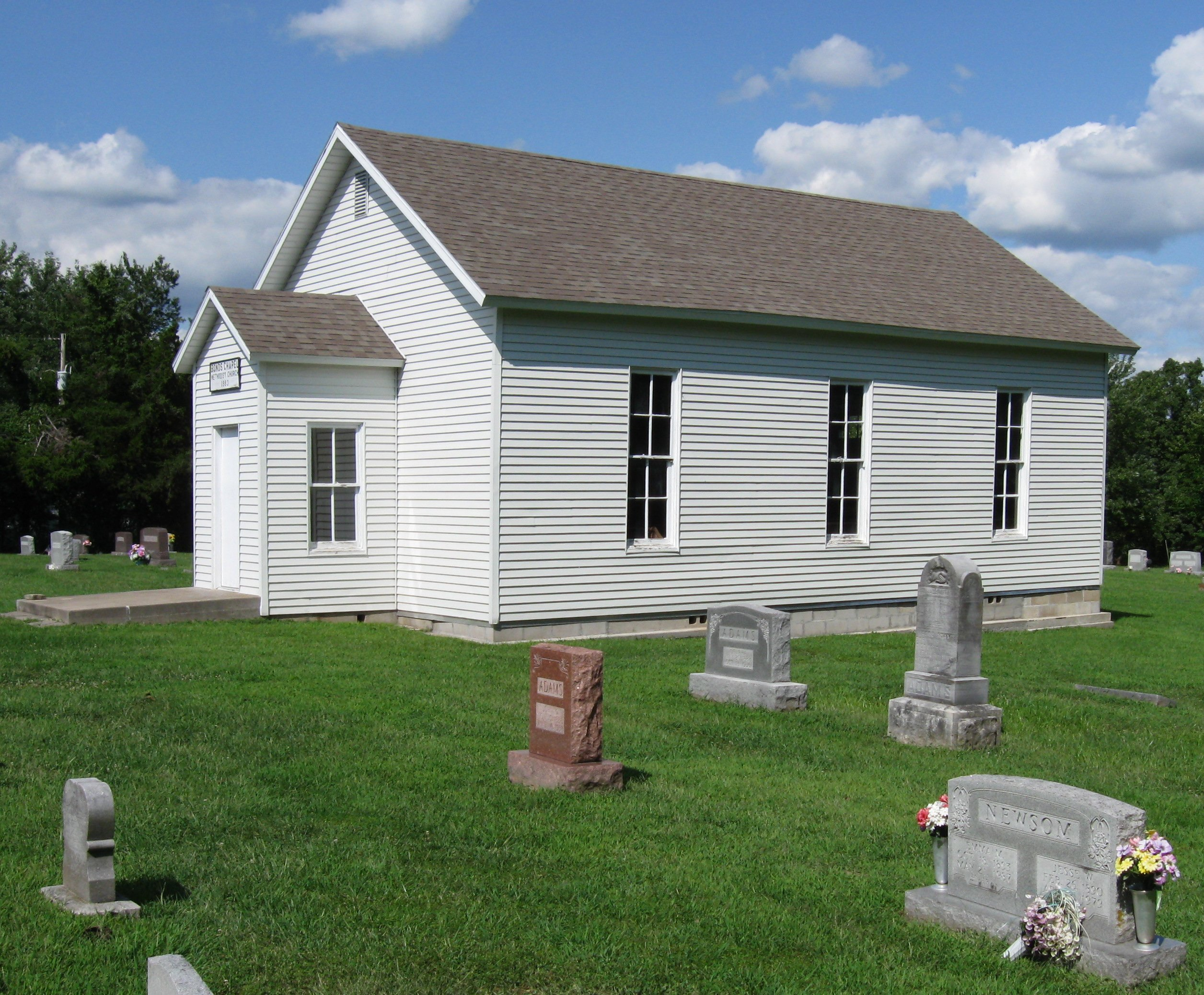

- Location within Missouri Location within the United States
- Location: MO A, 2.5 miles (4.0 km) northeast of Hartsburg, Missouri
- Coordinates: 38°42′32″N 92°17′6″W
- Area: less than one acre
- Built: 1883-1884
- NRHP reference No.: 93000940
- Added to NRHP: September 9, 1993

Bond's Chapel Methodist Episcopal Church, also known as Bond's Chapel, is a historic Methodist Episcopal church located near Hartsburg, Missouri. It was built in 1883–1884, and is a simple rectangular frame building, set on piers composed of creek rock and mortar. It measures 24 feet by 33 feet and has a front gable roof and vestibule.

It was added to the National Register of Historic Places in 1993.

== See also ==
- List of cemeteries in Boone County, Missouri
