= Missouri statistical areas =

Coordinates: 38.3566°N 92.4580°W

The U.S. State of Missouri currently has 32 statistical areas that have been delineated by the Office of Management and Budget (OMB). On July 21, 2023, the OMB delineated six combined statistical areas, eight metropolitan statistical areas, and 18 micropolitan statistical areas in Missouri. As of 2025, the largest of these is the St. Louis–St. Charles–Farmington, MO-IL CSA, comprising the area around St. Louis.

== Statistical areas ==
The Office of Management and Budget (OMB) has designated more than 1,000 statistical areas for the United States and Puerto Rico. These statistical areas are important geographic delineations of population clusters used by the OMB, the United States Census Bureau, planning organizations, and federal, state, and local government entities.

The OMB defines a core-based statistical area (CBSA) as the county or counties (or county-equivalents) surrounding at least one densely-settled core of at least 10,000 population, "plus adjacent counties having a high degree of social and economic integration with the core as measured through commuting ties with the counties containing the core". The OMB further divides a CBSA based on population into a metropolitan statistical area (MSA) for those with at least 50,000 people or a micropolitan statistical area (μSA) for those with 10,000 to 49,999 people.

The OMB defines a combined statistical area (CSA) as two or more adjacent CBSAs where the employment interchange rate (percent commuting from A to B plus percent commuting from B to A) is at least 15%. A primary statistical area (PSA) includes all CSAs and any CBSA that is not a constituent of a combined statistical area.

The 32 United States statistical areas, 114 counties and one independent city of the State of Missouri (Note: An out-of-state area and its population are displayed in green. An area that extends into more than one state is displayed in purple. A purple population number over a black population number show the total population versus the in-state population. The state's abbreviation is also shown next to the in-state total.)
Combined statistical area	2025 population (est.)	Core-based statistical area	2025 population (est.)	County	2025 population (est.)
St. Louis–St. Charles–Farmington, MO-IL CSA	2,918,612 (Note: Per the most recent OMB bulletin, the portion of Sullivan, Missouri within Crawford County, Missouri is included in St. Louis' statistical areas. Population data for this portion of Sullivan is not readily available and is not included in this table.); 2,210,277 (MO)	St. Louis, MO-IL MSA	2,814,421; 2,142,468 (MO)	St. Louis County, Missouri	990,911
St. Louis–St. Charles–Farmington, MO-IL CSA	2,918,612; 2,210,277 (MO)	St. Louis, MO-IL MSA	2,814,421; 2,142,468 (MO)	St. Charles County, Missouri	426,499
St. Louis–St. Charles–Farmington, MO-IL CSA	2,918,612; 2,210,277 (MO)	St. Louis, MO-IL MSA	2,814,421; 2,142,468 (MO)	St. Louis City	278,144
St. Louis–St. Charles–Farmington, MO-IL CSA	2,918,612; 2,210,277 (MO)	St. Louis, MO-IL MSA	2,814,421; 2,142,468 (MO)	Madison County, Illinois	263,110
St. Louis–St. Charles–Farmington, MO-IL CSA	2,918,612; 2,210,277 (MO)	St. Louis, MO-IL MSA	2,814,421; 2,142,468 (MO)	St. Clair County, Illinois	250,708
St. Louis–St. Charles–Farmington, MO-IL CSA	2,918,612; 2,210,277 (MO)	St. Louis, MO-IL MSA	2,814,421; 2,142,468 (MO)	Jefferson County, Missouri	233,132
St. Louis–St. Charles–Farmington, MO-IL CSA	2,918,612; 2,210,277 (MO)	St. Louis, MO-IL MSA	2,814,421; 2,142,468 (MO)	Franklin County, Missouri	108,090
St. Louis–St. Charles–Farmington, MO-IL CSA	2,918,612; 2,210,277 (MO)	St. Louis, MO-IL MSA	2,814,421; 2,142,468 (MO)	Lincoln County, Missouri	66,676
St. Louis–St. Charles–Farmington, MO-IL CSA	2,918,612; 2,210,277 (MO)	St. Louis, MO-IL MSA	2,814,421; 2,142,468 (MO)	Macoupin County, Illinois	43,748
St. Louis–St. Charles–Farmington, MO-IL CSA	2,918,612; 2,210,277 (MO)	St. Louis, MO-IL MSA	2,814,421; 2,142,468 (MO)	Warren County, Missouri	39,016
St. Louis–St. Charles–Farmington, MO-IL CSA	2,918,612; 2,210,277 (MO)	St. Louis, MO-IL MSA	2,814,421; 2,142,468 (MO)	Clinton County, Illinois	37,128
St. Louis–St. Charles–Farmington, MO-IL CSA	2,918,612; 2,210,277 (MO)	St. Louis, MO-IL MSA	2,814,421; 2,142,468 (MO)	Monroe County, Illinois	34,840
St. Louis–St. Charles–Farmington, MO-IL CSA	2,918,612; 2,210,277 (MO)	St. Louis, MO-IL MSA	2,814,421; 2,142,468 (MO)	Jersey County, Illinois	21,160
St. Louis–St. Charles–Farmington, MO-IL CSA	2,918,612; 2,210,277 (MO)	St. Louis, MO-IL MSA	2,814,421; 2,142,468 (MO)	Bond County, Illinois	16,959
St. Louis–St. Charles–Farmington, MO-IL CSA	2,918,612; 2,210,277 (MO)	St. Louis, MO-IL MSA	2,814,421; 2,142,468 (MO)	Calhoun County, Illinois	4,300
St. Louis–St. Charles–Farmington, MO-IL CSA	2,918,612; 2,210,277 (MO)	Farmington, MO μSA	67,809	St. Francois County, Missouri	67,809
St. Louis–St. Charles–Farmington, MO-IL CSA	2,918,612; 2,210,277 (MO)	Centralia, IL μSA	36,382	Marion County, Illinois	36,382
Kansas City–Overland Park–Kansas City, MO-KS CSA	2,609,823; 1,508,239 (MO)	Kansas City, MO-KS MSA	2,270,592; 1,332,399 (MO)	Jackson County, Missouri	732,994
Kansas City–Overland Park–Kansas City, MO-KS CSA	2,609,823; 1,508,239 (MO)	Kansas City, MO-KS MSA	2,270,592; 1,332,399 (MO)	Johnson County, Kansas	636,906
Kansas City–Overland Park–Kansas City, MO-KS CSA	2,609,823; 1,508,239 (MO)	Kansas City, MO-KS MSA	2,270,592; 1,332,399 (MO)	Clay County, Missouri	265,032
Kansas City–Overland Park–Kansas City, MO-KS CSA	2,609,823; 1,508,239 (MO)	Kansas City, MO-KS MSA	2,270,592; 1,332,399 (MO)	Wyandotte County, Kansas	170,597
Kansas City–Overland Park–Kansas City, MO-KS CSA	2,609,823; 1,508,239 (MO)	Kansas City, MO-KS MSA	2,270,592; 1,332,399 (MO)	Cass County, Missouri	115,859
Kansas City–Overland Park–Kansas City, MO-KS CSA	2,609,823; 1,508,239 (MO)	Kansas City, MO-KS MSA	2,270,592; 1,332,399 (MO)	Platte County, Missouri	114,400
Kansas City–Overland Park–Kansas City, MO-KS CSA	2,609,823; 1,508,239 (MO)	Kansas City, MO-KS MSA	2,270,592; 1,332,399 (MO)	Leavenworth County, Kansas	84,590
Kansas City–Overland Park–Kansas City, MO-KS CSA	2,609,823; 1,508,239 (MO)	Kansas City, MO-KS MSA	2,270,592; 1,332,399 (MO)	Miami County, Kansas	36,240
Kansas City–Overland Park–Kansas City, MO-KS CSA	2,609,823; 1,508,239 (MO)	Kansas City, MO-KS MSA	2,270,592; 1,332,399 (MO)	Lafayette County, Missouri	33,531
Kansas City–Overland Park–Kansas City, MO-KS CSA	2,609,823; 1,508,239 (MO)	Kansas City, MO-KS MSA	2,270,592; 1,332,399 (MO)	Ray County, Missouri	23,398
Kansas City–Overland Park–Kansas City, MO-KS CSA	2,609,823; 1,508,239 (MO)	Kansas City, MO-KS MSA	2,270,592; 1,332,399 (MO)	Clinton County, Missouri	21,661
Kansas City–Overland Park–Kansas City, MO-KS CSA	2,609,823; 1,508,239 (MO)	Kansas City, MO-KS MSA	2,270,592; 1,332,399 (MO)	Bates County, Missouri	16,512
Kansas City–Overland Park–Kansas City, MO-KS CSA	2,609,823; 1,508,239 (MO)	Kansas City, MO-KS MSA	2,270,592; 1,332,399 (MO)	Linn County, Kansas	9,860
Kansas City–Overland Park–Kansas City, MO-KS CSA	2,609,823; 1,508,239 (MO)	Kansas City, MO-KS MSA	2,270,592; 1,332,399 (MO)	Caldwell County, Missouri	9,012
Kansas City–Overland Park–Kansas City, MO-KS CSA	2,609,823; 1,508,239 (MO)	Lawrence, KS MSA	120,920	Douglas County, Kansas	120,920
Kansas City–Overland Park–Kansas City, MO-KS CSA	2,609,823; 1,508,239 (MO)	St. Joseph, MO-KS MSA	119,170; 111,576 (MO)	Buchanan County, Missouri	83,540
Kansas City–Overland Park–Kansas City, MO-KS CSA	2,609,823; 1,508,239 (MO)	St. Joseph, MO-KS MSA	119,170; 111,576 (MO)	Andrew County, Missouri	18,241
Kansas City–Overland Park–Kansas City, MO-KS CSA	2,609,823; 1,508,239 (MO)	St. Joseph, MO-KS MSA	119,170; 111,576 (MO)	DeKalb County, Missouri	9,795
Kansas City–Overland Park–Kansas City, MO-KS CSA	2,609,823; 1,508,239 (MO)	St. Joseph, MO-KS MSA	119,170; 111,576 (MO)	Doniphan County, Kansas	7,594
Kansas City–Overland Park–Kansas City, MO-KS CSA	2,609,823; 1,508,239 (MO)	Warrensburg, MO μSA	56,670	Johnson County, Missouri	56,670
Kansas City–Overland Park–Kansas City, MO-KS CSA	2,609,823; 1,508,239 (MO)	Ottawa, KS μSA	26,299	Franklin County, Kansas	26,299
Kansas City–Overland Park–Kansas City, MO-KS CSA	2,609,823; 1,508,239 (MO)	Atchison, KS μSA	16,172	Atchison County, Kansas	16,172
none		Springfield, MO MSA	500,694	Greene County, Missouri	309,286
none		Springfield, MO MSA	500,694	Christian County, Missouri	96,725
none		Springfield, MO MSA	500,694	Webster County, Missouri	43,054
none		Springfield, MO MSA	500,694	Polk County, Missouri	33,604
none		Springfield, MO MSA	500,694	Dallas County, Missouri	18,025
Columbia–Jefferson City–Moberly, MO CSA	420,815	Columbia, MO MSA	219,062	Boone County, Missouri	191,746
Columbia–Jefferson City–Moberly, MO CSA	420,815	Columbia, MO MSA	219,062	Cooper County, Missouri	17,136
Columbia–Jefferson City–Moberly, MO CSA	420,815	Columbia, MO MSA	219,062	Howard County, Missouri	10,180
Columbia–Jefferson City–Moberly, MO CSA	420,815	Jefferson City, MO MSA	152,712	Cole County, Missouri	77,908
Columbia–Jefferson City–Moberly, MO CSA	420,815	Jefferson City, MO MSA	152,712	Callaway County, Missouri	45,765
Columbia–Jefferson City–Moberly, MO CSA	420,815	Jefferson City, MO MSA	152,712	Moniteau County, Missouri	15,428
Columbia–Jefferson City–Moberly, MO CSA	420,815	Jefferson City, MO MSA	152,712	Osage County, Missouri	13,611
Columbia–Jefferson City–Moberly, MO CSA	420,815	Mexico, MO μSA	24,528	Audrain County, Missouri	24,528
Columbia–Jefferson City–Moberly, MO CSA	420,815	Moberly, MO μSA	24,513	Randolph County, Missouri	24,513
Joplin–Miami, MO-OK-KS CSA	239,234; 189,691 (MO)	Joplin, MO-KS MSA	208,796; 189,691 (MO)	Jasper County, Missouri	127,428
Joplin–Miami, MO-OK-KS CSA	239,234; 189,691 (MO)	Joplin, MO-KS MSA	208,796; 189,691 (MO)	Newton County, Missouri	62,263
Joplin–Miami, MO-OK-KS CSA	239,234; 189,691 (MO)	Joplin, MO-KS MSA	208,796; 189,691 (MO)	Cherokee County, Kansas	19,105
Joplin–Miami, MO-OK-KS CSA	239,234; 189,691 (MO)	Miami, OK μSA	30,438	Ottawa County, Oklahoma	30,438
Cape Girardeau–Sikeston, MO-IL CSA	149,193; 144,623 (MO)	Cape Girardeau, MO-IL MSA	99,215; 94,645 (MO)	Cape Girardeau County, Missouri	83,999
Cape Girardeau–Sikeston, MO-IL CSA	149,193; 144,623 (MO)	Cape Girardeau, MO-IL MSA	99,215; 94,645 (MO)	Bollinger County, Missouri	10,646
Cape Girardeau–Sikeston, MO-IL CSA	149,193; 144,623 (MO)	Cape Girardeau, MO-IL MSA	99,215; 94,645 (MO)	Alexander County, Illinois	4,570
Cape Girardeau–Sikeston, MO-IL CSA	149,193; 144,623 (MO)	Sikeston, MO μSA	49,978	Scott County, Missouri	37,975
Cape Girardeau–Sikeston, MO-IL CSA	149,193; 144,623 (MO)	Sikeston, MO μSA	49,978	Mississippi County, Missouri	12,003
none		Branson, MO μSA	57,001	Taney County, Missouri	57,001
none		Fort Leonard Wood, MO μSA	54,442	Pulaski County, Missouri	54,442
Quincy–Hannibal, IL-MO CSA	113,115; 48,848 (MO)	Quincy, IL-MO μSA	74,146; 9,879 (MO)	Adams County, Illinois	64,267
Quincy–Hannibal, IL-MO CSA	113,115; 48,848 (MO)	Quincy, IL-MO μSA	74,146; 9,879 (MO)	Lewis County, Missouri	9,879
Quincy–Hannibal, IL-MO CSA	113,115; 48,848 (MO)	Hannibal, MO μSA	38,969	Marion County, Missouri	28,525
Quincy–Hannibal, IL-MO CSA	113,115; 48,848 (MO)	Hannibal, MO μSA	38,969	Ralls County, Missouri	10,444
none		Rolla, MO μSA	45,247	Phelps County, Missouri	45,247
none		Sedalia, MO μSA	44,254	Pettis County, Missouri	44,254
none		Poplar Bluff, MO μSA	41,904	Butler County, Missouri	41,904
none		West Plains, MO μSA	40,798	Howell County, Missouri	40,798
none		Lebanon, MO μSA	36,943	Laclede County, Missouri	36,943
none		Kirksville, MO μSA	29,824	Adair County, Missouri	25,684
none		Kirksville, MO μSA	29,824	Schuyler County, Missouri	4,140
none		Kennett, MO μSA	26,855	Dunklin County, Missouri	26,855
none		Marshall, MO μSA	23,265	Saline County, Missouri	23,265
none		Maryville, MO μSA	20,174	Nodaway County, Missouri	20,174
none		none		Camden County, Missouri	44,047
none		none		Lawrence County, Missouri	39,401
none		none		Barry County, Missouri	36,200
none		none		Stone County, Missouri	32,503
none		none		Stoddard County, Missouri	28,284
none		none		Texas County, Missouri	25,994
none		none		Miller County, Missouri	25,817
none		none		McDonald County, Missouri	23,992
none		none		Washington County, Missouri	23,810
none		none		Crawford County, Missouri	22,929
none		none		Henry County, Missouri	22,671
none		none		Morgan County, Missouri	22,418
none		none		Benton County, Missouri	20,536
none		none		Vernon County, Missouri	19,946
none		none		Wright County, Missouri	19,671
none		none		Perry County, Missouri	19,093
none		none		Ste. Genevieve County, Missouri	18,689
none		none		Pike County, Missouri	17,955
none		none		Macon County, Missouri	15,190
none		none		New Madrid County, Missouri	15,086
none		none		Cedar County, Missouri	14,888
none		none		Gasconade County, Missouri	14,784
none		none		Livingston County, Missouri	14,708
none		none		Dent County, Missouri	14,584
none		none		Pemiscot County, Missouri	14,465
none		none		Madison County, Missouri	12,858
none		none		Douglas County, Missouri	12,342
none		none		Linn County, Missouri	11,815
none		none		Barton County, Missouri	11,795
none		none		Montgomery County, Missouri	11,590
none		none		Wayne County, Missouri	10,782
none		none		Ripley County, Missouri	10,717
none		none		St. Clair County, Missouri	9,976
none		none		Grundy County, Missouri	9,744
none		none		Iron County, Missouri	9,318
none		none		Ozark County, Missouri	9,172
none		none		Hickory County, Missouri	9,044
none		none		Monroe County, Missouri	8,959
none		none		Oregon County, Missouri	8,709
none		none		Daviess County, Missouri	8,558
none		none		Carroll County, Missouri	8,417
none		none		Maries County, Missouri	8,397
none		none		Harrison County, Missouri	8,281
none		none		Dade County, Missouri	7,804
none		none		Chariton County, Missouri	7,377
none		none		Shannon County, Missouri	7,285
none		none		Clark County, Missouri	6,475
none		none		Gentry County, Missouri	6,384
none		none		Reynolds County, Missouri	5,992
none		none		Shelby County, Missouri	5,870
none		none		Sullivan County, Missouri	5,738
none		none		Carter County, Missouri	5,418
none		none		Atchison County, Missouri	5,175
none		none		Scotland County, Missouri	4,796
none		none		Putnam County, Missouri	4,546
none		none		Holt County, Missouri	4,200
none		none		Knox County, Missouri	3,728
none		none		Mercer County, Missouri	3,404
none		none		Worth County, Missouri	1,914
State of Missouri					6,270,541

The 26 core-based statistical areas of the State of Missouri (Note: For CBSAs comprising populations from multiple states, they are listed twice to show both their intrastate population within that CBSA as well as the CBSA's total population. Only the intrastate population is ranked.)
2025 rank	Core-based statistical area	Population				
2025 rank	Core-based statistical area	2025 estimate	Change	2020 Census	Change	2010 Census
1	St. Louis, MO-IL MSA (MO)	2,142,468	+0.23%	2,137,492	+2.56%	2,084,037
2	Kansas City, MO-KS MSA (MO)	1,332,399	+3.51%	1,287,264	+8.27%	1,188,988
3	Springfield, MO MSA	500,694	+5.31%	475,432	+8.87%	436,712
4	Columbia, MO MSA	219,062	+3.89%	210,864	+10.76%	190,387
5	Joplin, MO-KS MSA (MO)	189,691	+4.57%	181,409	+3.36%	175,518
6	Jefferson City, MO MSA	152,712	+1.60%	150,309	+0.34%	149,807
7	St. Joseph, MO-KS MSA (MO)	111,576	−2.09%	113,957	−4.55%	119,384
8	Cape Girardeau, MO-IL MSA (MO)	94,645	+2.57%	92,277	+4.82%	88,037
9	Farmington, MO μSA	67,809	+1.33%	66,922	+2.39%	65,359
10	Branson, MO μSA	57,001	+1.67%	56,066	+8.50%	51,675
11	Warrensburg, MO μSA	56,670	+4.92%	54,013	+2.70%	52,595
12	Fort Leonard Wood, MO μSA	54,442	+0.90%	53,955	+3.22%	52,274
13	Sikeston, MO μSA	49,978	−1.30%	50,636	−5.44%	53,549
14	Rolla, MO μSA	45,247	+1.36%	44,638	−1.15%	45,156
15	Sedalia, MO μSA	44,254	+2.96%	42,980	+1.85%	42,201
16	Poplar Bluff, MO μSA	41,904	−0.54%	42,130	−1.55%	42,794
17	West Plains, MO μSA	40,798	+2.64%	39,750	−1.61%	40,400
18	Hannibal, MO μSA	38,969	+0.23%	38,880	−0.17%	38,948
19	Lebanon, MO μSA	36,943	+2.51%	36,039	+1.32%	35,571
20	Kirksville, MO μSA	29,824	+1.63%	29,346	−2.30%	30,038
21	Kennett, MO μSA	26,855	−5.05%	28,283	−11.49%	31,953
22	Mexico, MO μSA	24,528	−1.74%	24,962	−2.22%	25,529
23	Moberly, MO μSA	24,513	−0.82%	24,716	−2.75%	25,414
24	Marshall, MO μSA	23,265	−0.29%	23,333	−0.16%	23,370
25	Maryville, MO μSA	20,174	−5.02%	21,241	−9.11%	23,370
26	Quincy, IL-MO μSA (MO)	9,879	−1.53%	10,032	−1.75%	10,211
	Cape Girardeau, MO-IL MSA	99,215	+1.74%	97,517	+1.29%	96,275
	Joplin, MO-KS MSA	208,796	+4.00%	200,771	+1.85%	197,121
	Kansas City, MO-KS MSA	2,270,592	+3.58%	2,192,035	+9.09%	2,009,342
	Quincy IL-MO μSA	74,146	−2.14%	75,769	−2.00%	77,314
	St. Joseph, MO-KS MSA	119,170	−1.89%	121,467	−4.60%	127,329
	St. Louis, MO-IL MSA	2,814,421	−0.21%	2,820,253	+1.17%	2,787,701

The six combined statistical areas of the State of Missouri (Note: For CSAs comprising populations from multiple states, they are listed twice to show both their intrastate population within that CSA as well as the CSA's total population. Only the intrastate population is ranked.)
2025 rank	Combined statistical area	Population				
2025 rank	Combined statistical area	2025 estimate	Change	2020 Census	Change	2010 Census
1	St. Louis–St. Charles–Farmington, MO-IL CSA (MO)	2,210,277	+0.27%	2,204,414	+2.56%	2,149,396
2	Kansas City–Overland Park–Kansas City, MO-KS CSA (MO)	1,508,239	+3.64%	1,455,234	+6.93%	1,360,967
3	Columbia–Jefferson City–Moberly, MO CSA	420,815	+2.43%	410,851	+5.04%	391,137
4	Joplin–Miami, MO-OK-KS CSA (MO)	189,691	+4.57%	181,409	+3.36%	175,518
5	Cape Girardeau–Sikeston, MO-IL CSA (MO)	144,623	+1.20%	142,913	+0.94%	141,586
6	Quincy–Hannibal, IL-MO CSA (MO)	48,848	−0.13%	48,912	−0.50%	49,159
	Cape Girardeau–Sikeston, MO-IL CSA	149,193	+0.70%	148,153	−1.12%	149,824
	Joplin–Miami, MO-OK-KS CSA	239,234	+3.54%	231,056	+0.91%	228,969
	Kansas City–Overland Park–Kansas City, MO-KS CSA	2,609,823	+3.21%	2,528,644	+7.92%	2,343,008
	Quincy–Hannibal, IL-MO CSA	113,115	−1.34%	114,649	−1.39%	116,262
	St. Louis–St. Charles–Farmington, MO-IL CSA	2,918,612	−0.22%	2,924,904	+1.12%	2,892,497

== See also ==
- Geography of Missouri
  - Demographics of Missouri
