= Harg, Missouri =

Unincorporated community in Missouri, US

Coordinates: 38°55′36″N 92°13′53″W

Harg is an unincorporated community in Boone County, in the U.S. state of Missouri.

== History ==
A post office called Harg was established in 1892, and remained in operation until 1907. The community was named after John H. McHarg, a local merchant.
