= Ginlet, Missouri =

Unincorporated community in Missouri, U.S.

Coordinates: 38°51′35″N 92°11′33″W

Ginlet is an unincorporated community in Boone County, in the U.S. state of Missouri.

== History ==
A post office called Ginlet was established in 1903, and remained in operation until 1907. The community was said to be as small as a gimlet, hence the name (a postal error accounts for the error in spelling, which was never corrected).
