= Gordon Tract Archeological Site =

- U.S. National Register of Historic Places
- U.S. Historic district
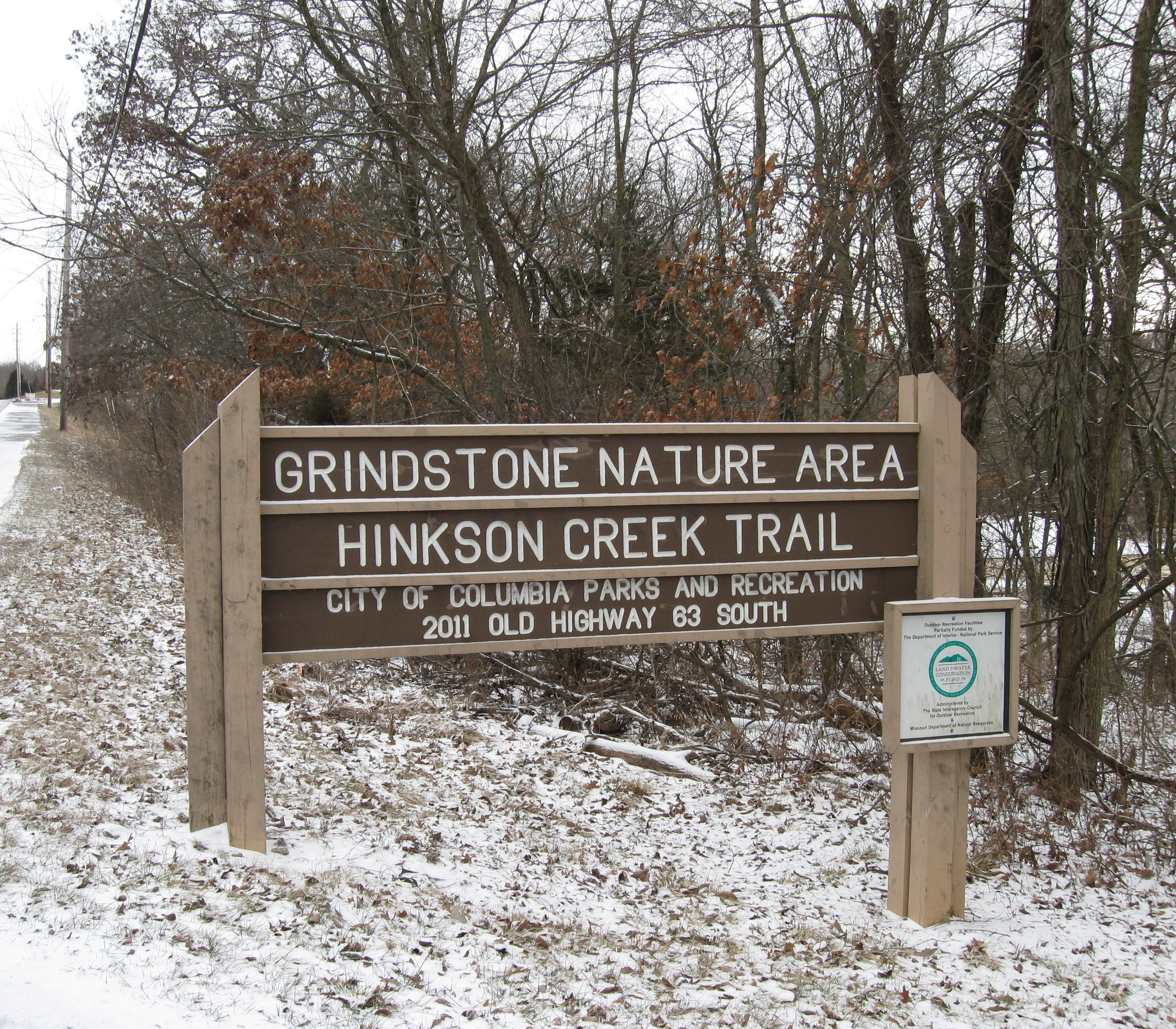
- Grindstone Nature Area
- Nearest city: Columbia, Missouri
- Area: 105 acres (42 ha)
- NRHP reference No.: 72000705
- Added to NRHP: March 16, 1972

The Gordon Tract is a late Woodland period archeological site located on the floodplain and bluffs of Hinkson Creek near Columbia, Missouri, United States, which contains the remains of a prehistoric village and mounds. Radiocarbon dating of material obtained from the site gave dates of 1017 and 1112 C.E. The site was added to the National Register of Historic Places in 1972. The exact location of the site is restricted to protect the remains from harm. The Missouri Department of Natural Resources lists the site in Grindstone Nature Area, a city park.
