= Battle of Mount Zion Church =

Battle of the American Civil War

Coordinates: 39.069170°N 92.179170°W

- Part of the Trans-Mississippi Theater of the American Civil War
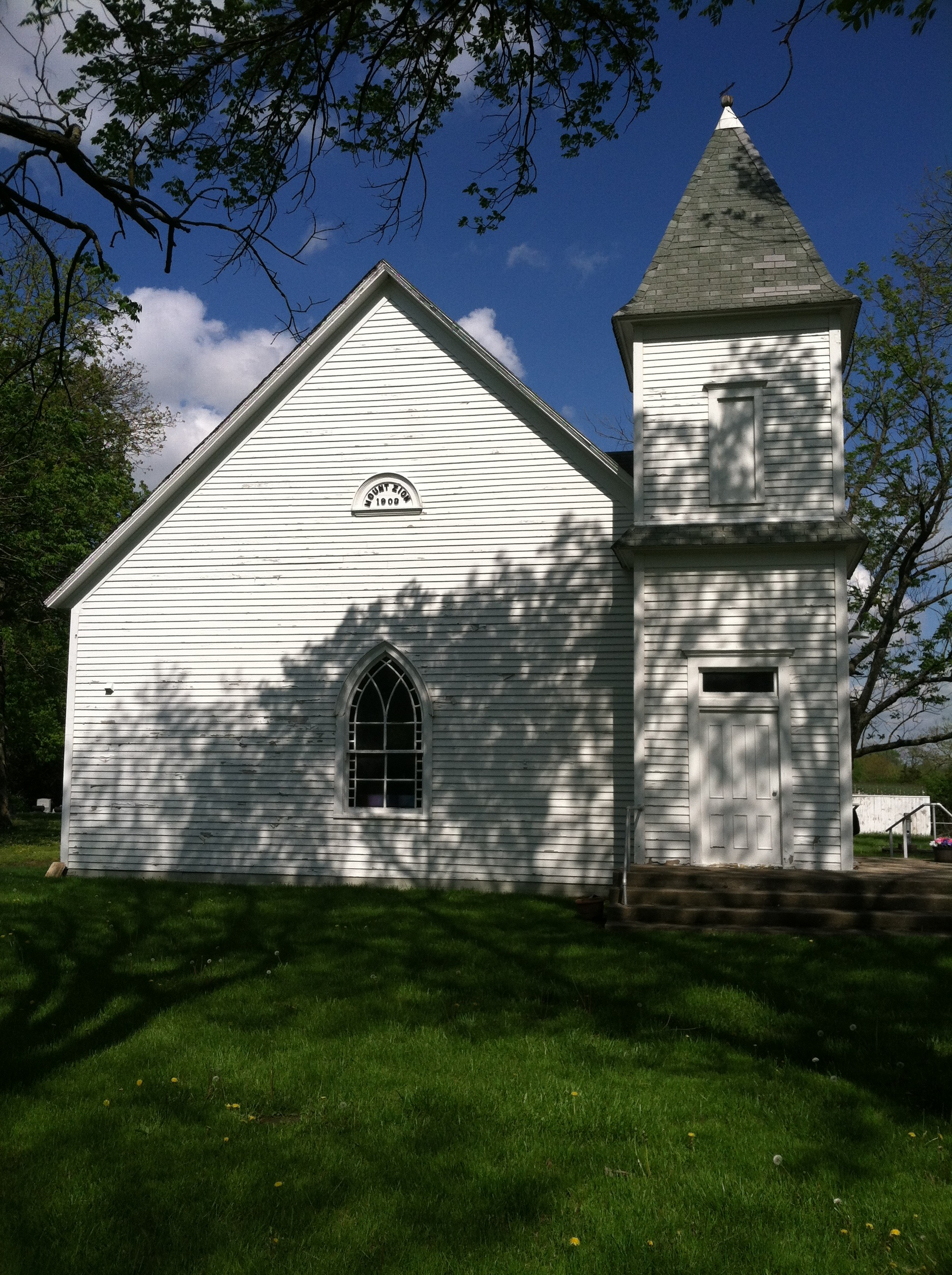
- Mt. Zion Church from the west
Date	December 28, 1861
Location	Boone County, Missouri
Result	Union victory

Belligerents
United States (Union)	Missouri (Confederate)

Commanders and leaders
(United States) Benjamin M. Prentiss	Caleb W. Dorsey

Units involved
3rd Missouri Cavalry; Birge's Western Sharpshooters	Missouri State Guard

Strength
440	~900

Casualties and losses
3 dead 63 wounded 4 captured	~25 dead ~150 wounded 60 captured

The Battle of Mount Zion Church was fought on December 28, 1861, in Boone County, near Mount Zion Church, during the American Civil War. The resulting Union victory here and elsewhere in central Missouri ended Confederate recruiting activities in the region and pushed conventional Confederate forces out of the area until the desperate fall 1864 invasion by General Sterling Price and his Missouri State Guard.

== Advance into Hallsville ==
Brig. Gen. Benjamin M. Prentiss led a Union force of five companies of the Third Missouri Cavalry [Federal] and two companies of Birge's Western Sharpshooters into Boone County to protect the North Missouri Railroad, disrupt the organization of the secessionist Missouri State Guard, and generally overawe secessionist sentiment in the region. Prentiss's forces left the Northern Missouri headquarters in Palmyra, Missouri, on December 24.

After arriving in Sturgeon on December 26, Prentiss learned about a concentration of State Guard near Hallsville. He sent a company to Hallsville the next day that fought a State Guard detachment under the command of Colonel Caleb Dorsey and, in a 10-minute skirmish about one half mile north of Mount Zion Church, itself situated about 3 miles southeast of Hallsville and 15 miles northeast of Columbia. Prentiss's troops suffered casualties, including men taken prisoner, before retreating back to Sturgeon by 6 p.m.

== Battle at Mt. Zion ==
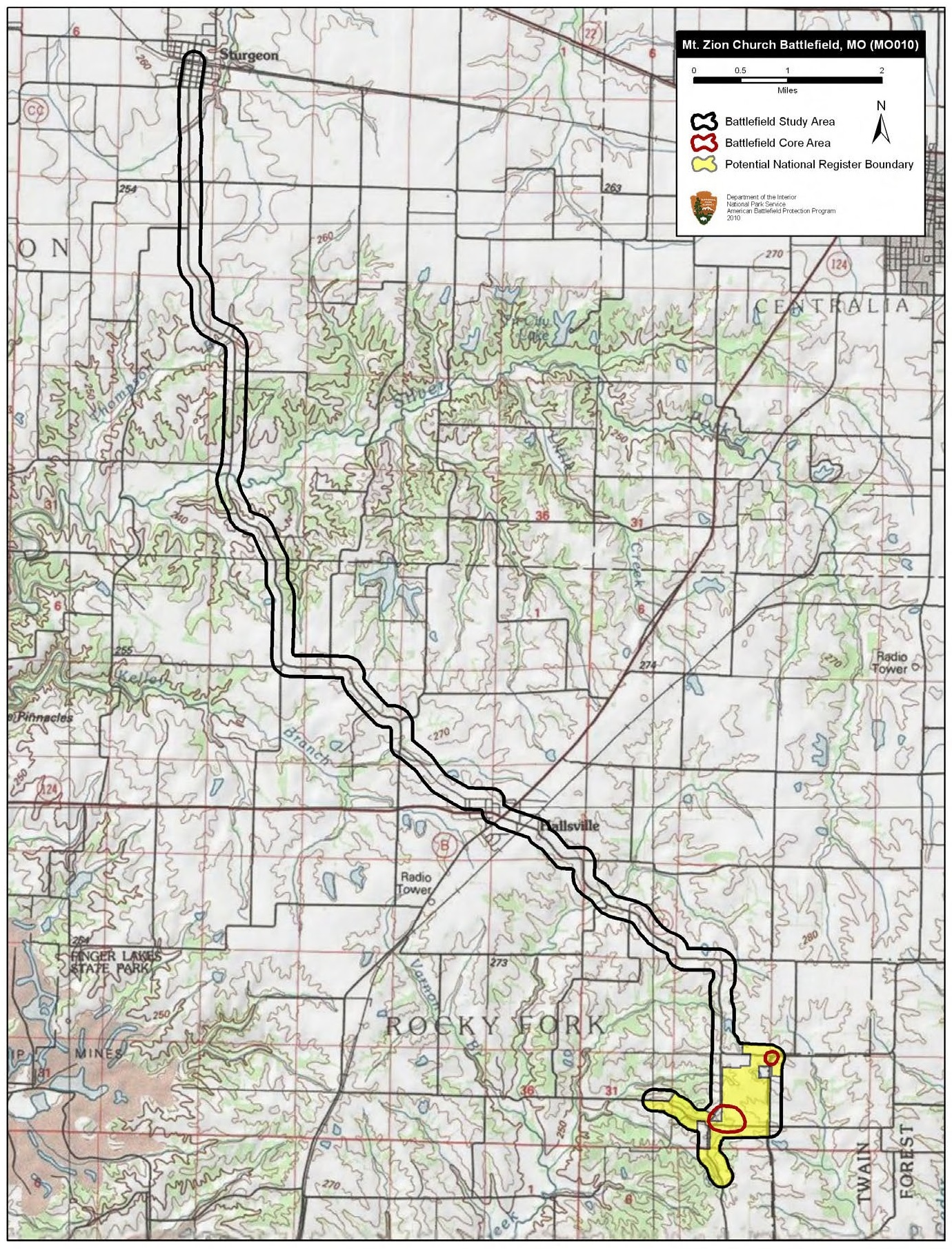
Map of Mount Zion Church Battlefield core and study areas by the American Battlefield Protection Program.

On December 28 at about 2 a.m., Prentiss set out with his entire force to meet Dorsey's force. While the State Guardsmen numbered around 900, most appear to have been local volunteers, many of whom were not armed with military weapons (although many had personal civilian firearms of various types). A detachment of Prentiss's force routed one company of Guardsmen on the road from Hallsville around 100 yards east of Mount Zion Church and learned that the rest of the force was in the churchyard, situated on a high hill. The main campground was actually in a thicketed hollow immediately east of the church. Prentiss advanced on the State Guard positions, making three charges. At the third, the Confederates exhausted their ammunition, fell back to their wagons, and were overrun. The battle ended around 11 a.m.

== Aftermath ==
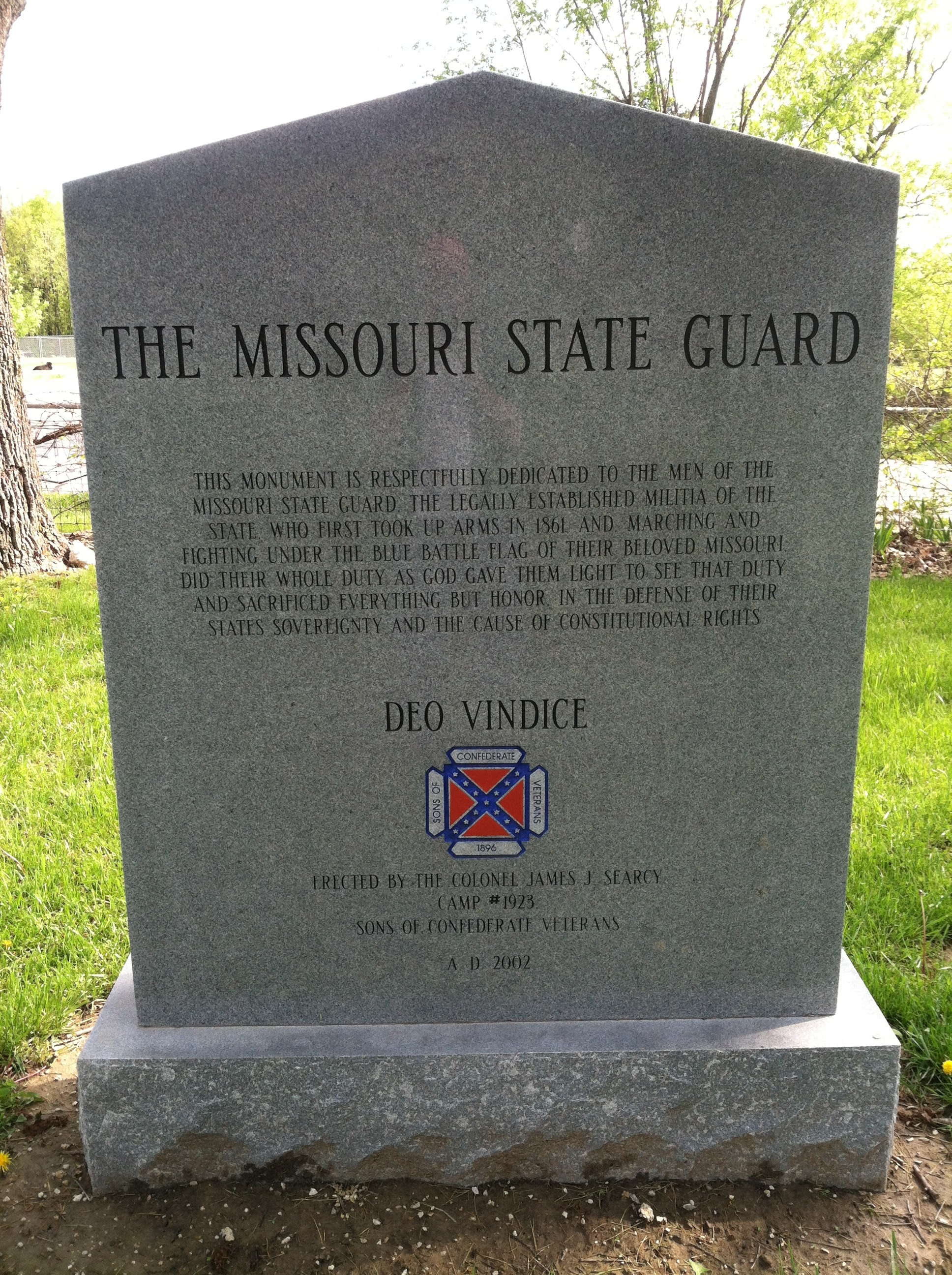
The Confederate memorial near the church building

The Missouri State Guard was effectively routed from northern Boone county to Columbia. Dorsey's forces lost 25 dead, 150 wounded, and an additional 60 captured, including an officer. Additionally, the Guardsmen lost wagons, 90 horses, and 105 arms. The remainder dispersed, with Dorsey heading westward into Perche township, the northwest section of Boone County towards the Missouri River. After negotiation and exchange of prisoners, Dorsey made camp near Everett, Missouri. Within days Dorsey received orders from State Guard commander, Maj. Gen. Sterling Price to scatter his forces. Mount Zion and the associated battle of Roan's Tan Yard effectively ended attempts at formal State Guard organization in Central Missouri. Remaining elements of Dorsey's command crossed the Missouri and joined General Pierce in February 1862. While guerrilla warfare reappeared to the south and west of Columbia, Confederates did not thereafter face Union forces in conventional battle in the area until Price's Raid in the autumn of 1864.

== Battlefield today ==
Today, the church and associated cemetery are listed on the National Register of Historic Places. The cemetery grounds contain the remains of soldiers who perished and a memorial marker for the Missouri State Guard.
