= Mount Zion Church and Cemetery (Hallsville, Missouri) =

Historic site in Boone County, Missouri, US

- U.S. National Register of Historic Places
- U.S. Historic district
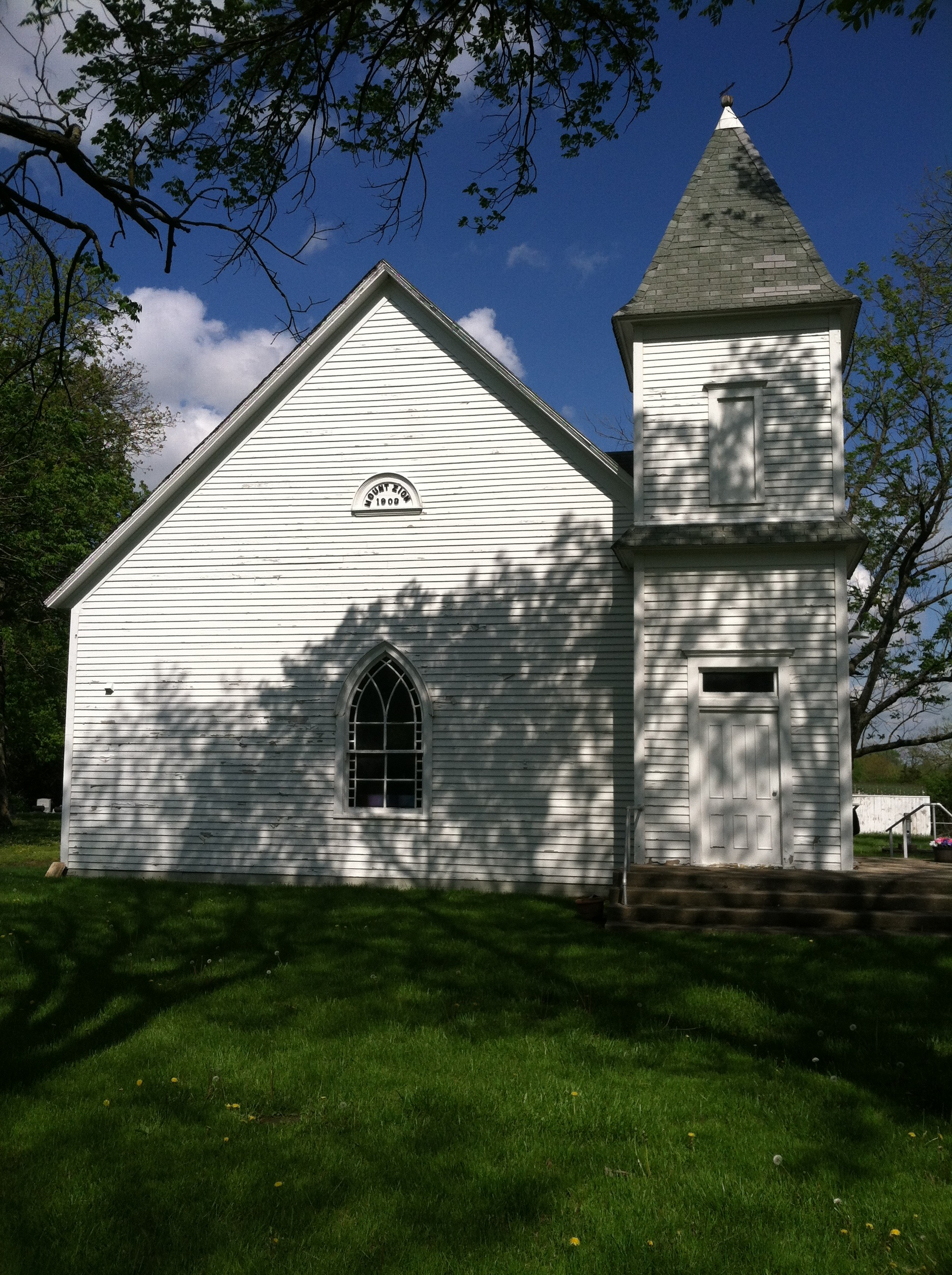
- The church building from the west

- Location within Missouri Location within the United States
- Location: 11070 E. Mount Zion Road, Hallsville, Missouri
- Coordinates: 39°04′09″N 92°10′46″W
- Area: 3 acres (1.2 ha)
- Architect: Weldon Jones, Wesley Sebastian, Martin and James Carlos, Charles Critchfield
- Architectural style: Gothic Revival
- MPS: Rural Church Architecture of Missouri, c. 1819 to c. 1945 MPS
- NRHP reference No.: 12001177
- Added to NRHP: January 14, 2013

Mount Zion Church and Cemetery is a historic church and cemetery located east of Hallsville in Boone County, Missouri. The Gothic Revival style frame church was built in 1903. It was the location of the Battle of Mount Zion Church during the American Civil War. The cemetery contains over seven hundred grave sites, including many American Civil War soldiers. The grounds contain a memorial to the Missouri State Guard. The church is still functioning today.

It was listed on the National Register of Historic Places in 2013.

== See also ==
- List of cemeteries in Boone County, Missouri

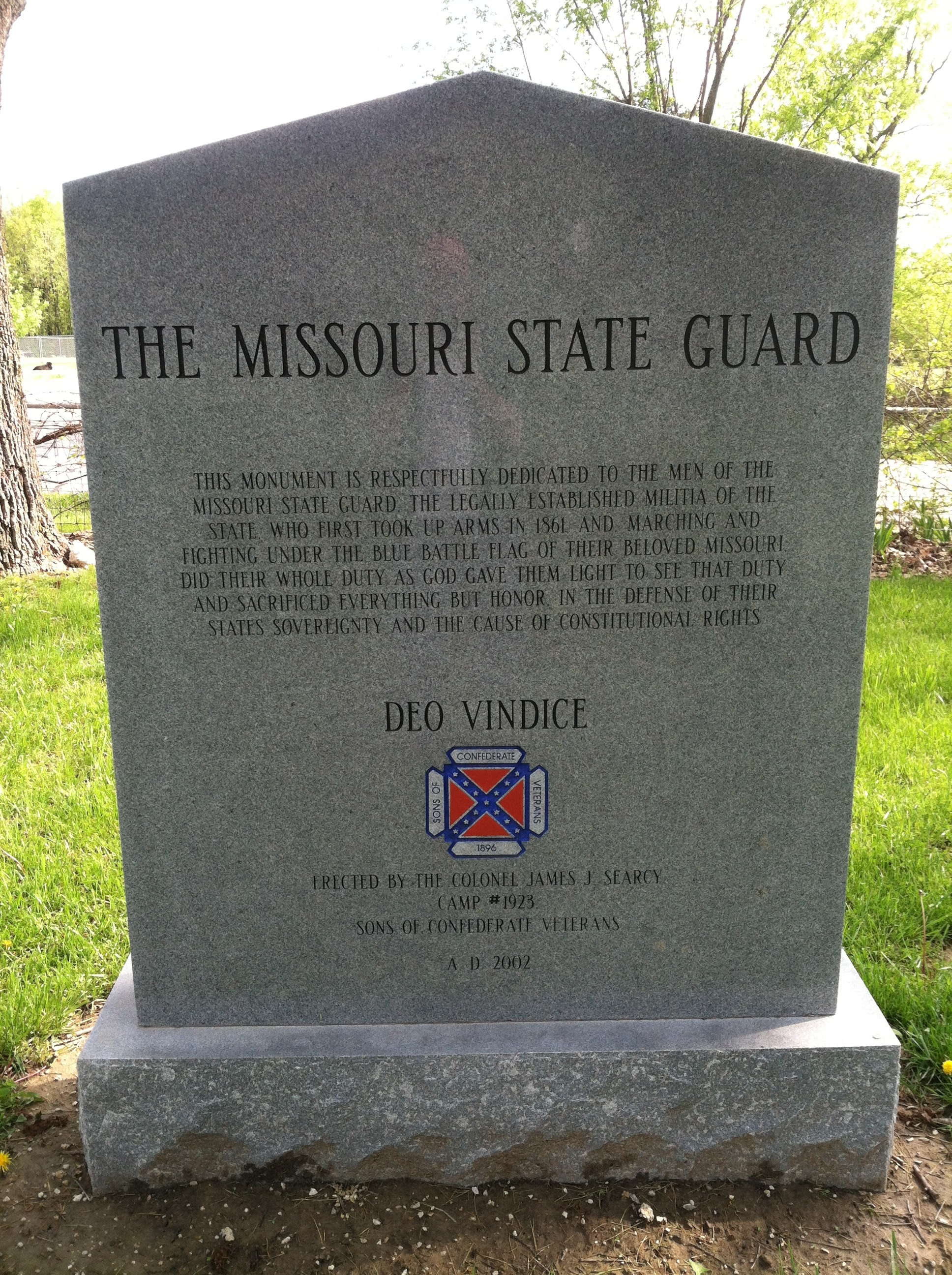
The Confederate memorial located near the church building
