= Hinton, Missouri =

- Unincorporated community
- Interactive map of Hinton, Missouri
- Coordinates: 39.0536507°N 92.3404594°W
- Country: United States
- State: Missouri
- County: Boone
- Elevation: 787 ft (240 m)
- Time zone: UTC−06:00 (CST)
  - Summer (DST): UTC−05:00 (CDT)

Hinton is an unincorporated community in Boone County, in the U.S. state of Missouri. It is located just north of Columbia.

== History ==
A post office called Hinton was established in 1885, and remained in operation until 1907. The community was named after John W. Hinton, a 19th-century county judge.
