= Riggs, Missouri =

Unincorporated community in Missouri

Coordinates: 39°10′16″N 92°20′44″W

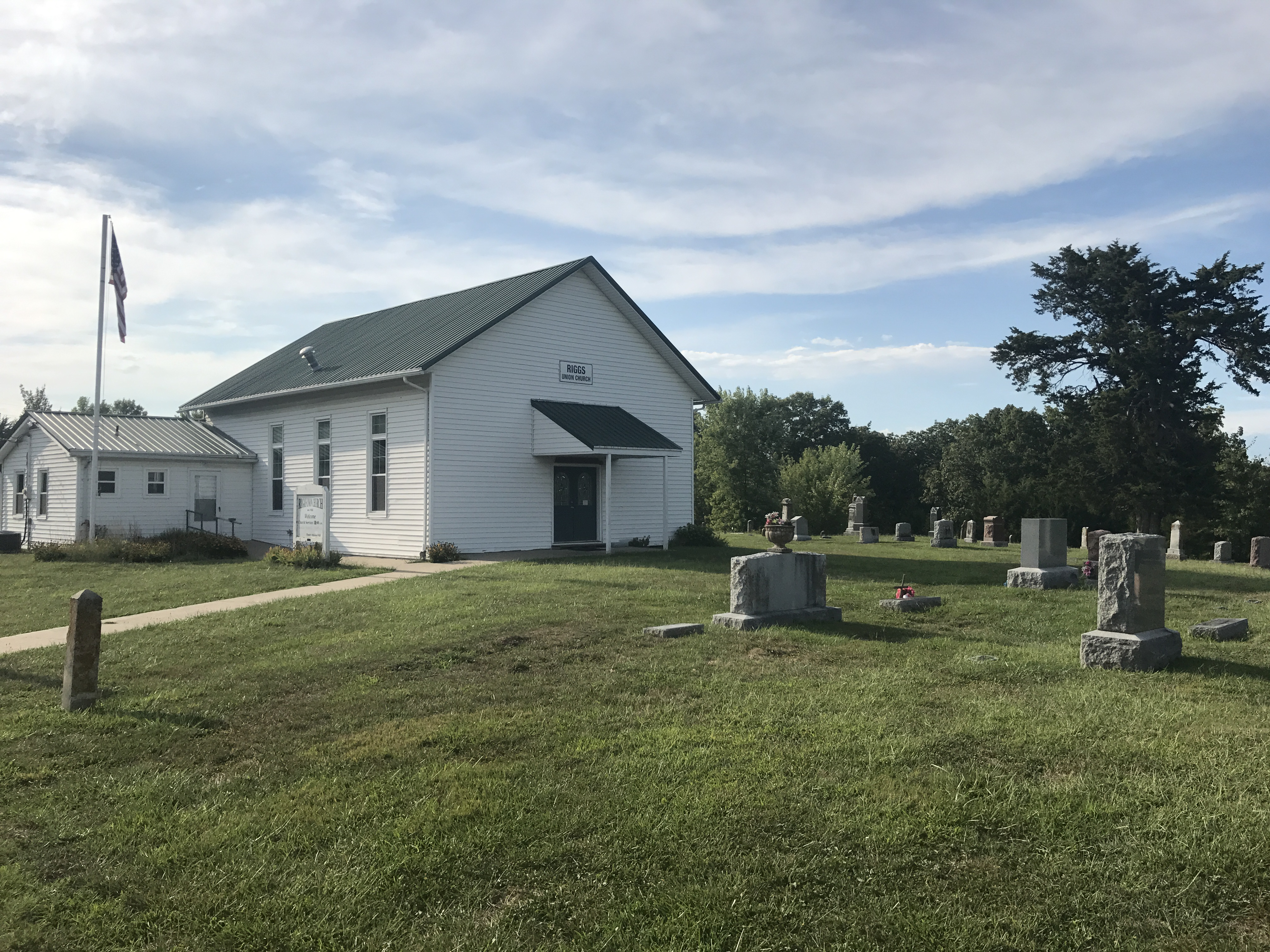
Riggs Union Church and Cemetery

Riggs is an unincorporated community in Boone County, in the U.S. state of Missouri. Today the community is centered around Riggs Union Church. A small store and several homes formerly stood at the intersection of Old Number 7 and Williams Road. The Mount Carmel (Sims) Cemetery is nearby.

== History ==
A post office called Riggs was established in 1889, and remained in operation until 1907. The community was named after Shelton Riggs, a local merchant whose store also contained the post office.
