= William Jewell (educator) =

American politician

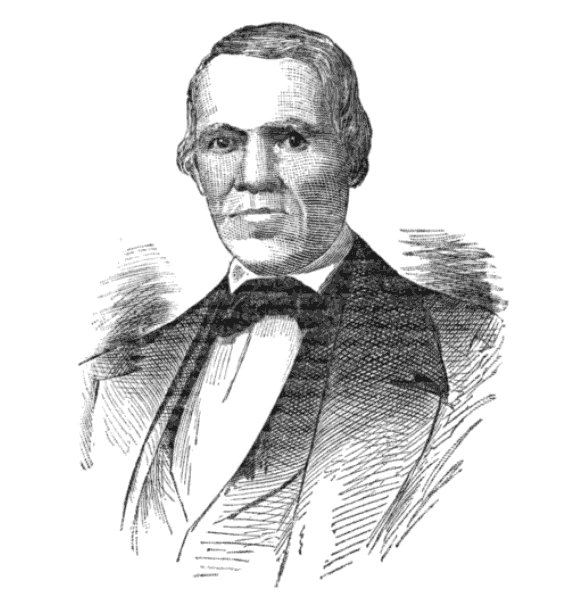
- Born: January 1, 1789; Loudoun County, Virginia
- Died: August 7, 1852 (aged 63); Liberty, Missouri
- Occupation: Physician
- Known for: Namesake of William Jewell College
- Spouse: Arethusa Boyle
- Children: Thomas Boyle Jewell; Angelina Arethusa Jewell

William Jewell (1789–1852) was a politician, physician, ordained minister, and educator from Columbia, Missouri and namesake of William Jewell College in Liberty, Missouri. He served as Columbia's second mayor.

== Life ==
Jewell graduated with a degree in medicine from Transylvania University. He moved to Columbia, Missouri and built a combination home, office, and hospital at the northwest corner of Sixth Street and Broadway. Jewell's two-story structure was the only hospital in Columbia at the time it was built. Jewell held political office as mayor of Columbia and later as a state legislator.

As mayor of Columbia, Jewell initiated the surveying and paving of the city's streets. He also improved sanitation standards in the early town. Later, as state legislator, Jewell worked for reforms such as abolishing the whipping post and pillory and for establishing a public hospital in St. Louis.

Though William Jewell had a full life of public service, he was also quite influential in Baptist life in Missouri. William Jewell was perhaps the leading force behind organizing the First Baptist Church in Columbia and its most influential member for almost forty years. He was buried in Columbia's Jewell Cemetery. Inside Jewell Cemetery, William Jewell's tombstone has a memorable epitaph: "His work is done, he did it well and faithfully."

== Educational advocacy ==
Dr. Jewell was known for his involvement with education. He was one of three men who accepted applications for enrollment to the University of Missouri, which was established in 1839. He was a member of the board of trustees in 1833 when Columbia Female College, predecessor to Stephens College was founded. He supported a bill to establish the location of the state university in Columbia and chaired a committee to raise subscriptions for the university, giving $1,800 himself.

In founding the college that bears his name, he initially wanted the Baptist school to be in Boonville, Missouri. However, after Alexander William Doniphan argued that the offer of a larger parcel of undeveloped land in Liberty, Missouri was worth more than the developed land in Boonville, the Liberty site was chosen and Jewell donated $10,000 (~$297,346 in 2024) to start school in 1849. He was appointed by the college's Board to supervise the construction of the first building in 1850. Later that year, during the exceptionally hot summer, Dr. Jewell while working on the building site got heat stroke and died a few days later. The building was also named after him, Jewell Hall, and was completed in 1858, at a cost of about $44,000 (~$1.24 million in 2024).

== See also ==
- List of mayors of Columbia, Missouri
