= Woodlandville, Missouri =

Unincorporated community in Missouri, U.S.

Coordinates: 39°03′44″N 92°29′02″W

Woodlandville is an unincorporated community in western Boone County, Missouri, United States. The community is on Missouri Route J about six miles south of Harrisburg and 5.5 miles north of I-70 and Rocheport.

== History ==
A post office called Woodlandville was established in 1872, and remained in operation until 1932. Woodlandville was so named because the land was covered with wood, and in contradistinction to prairie.
