= Pierpont, Missouri =

Coordinates: 38°51′44″N 92°18′54″W

- Village
- Village of Pierpont
- Interactive map of Pierpont, Missouri
- Country: United States
- State: Missouri
- County: Boone

Area
  - Total: 0.23 sq mi (0.59 km^{2})
  - Land: 0.23 sq mi (0.59 km^{2})
  - Water: 0 sq mi (0.00 km^{2})
- Elevation: 768 ft (234 m)

Population (2020)
  - Total: 64
  - Density: 280/sq mi (108.3/km^{2})
- FIPS code: 29-57512
- GNIS feature ID: 2399669

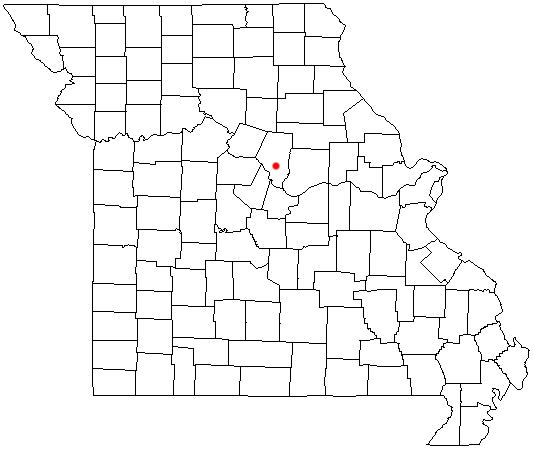
Location of Pierpont, Missouri

Pierpont is a village in Boone County, Missouri, United States. It is part of the Columbia, Missouri Metropolitan Statistical Area. The population was 64 at the 2020 census. The village, located south of Rock Bridge Memorial State Park at Route N and Highway 163, was incorporated in 2004 to avoid annexation by the city of Columbia. It is now an independent village with its own governing board of trustees.

== Geography ==
According to the United States Census Bureau, the village has a total area of 0.25 square miles (0.65 km^{2}), all land.

== Demographics ==
Historical population
Census	Pop.	Note	%±
2010	76		—
2020	64		−15.8%
U.S. Decennial Census

=== 2010 census ===
As of the census of 2010, there were 76 people, 32 households, and 25 families residing in the village. The population density was 304.0 inhabitants per square mile (117.4/km^{2}). There were 32 housing units at an average density of 128.0 per square mile (49.4/km^{2}). The racial makeup of the village was 97.4% White, 1.3% African American, and 1.3% from two or more races.

There were 32 households, of which 25.0% had children under the age of 18 living with them, 75.0% were married couples living together, 3.1% had a male householder with no wife present, and 21.9% were non-families. 18.8% of all households were made up of individuals, and 9.4% had someone living alone who was 65 years of age or older. The average household size was 2.38 and the average family size was 2.72.

The median age in the village was 54.3 years. 19.7% of residents were under the age of 18; 4% were between the ages of 18 and 24; 14.4% were from 25 to 44; 35.5% were from 45 to 64; and 26.3% were 65 years of age or older. The gender makeup of the village was 52.6% male and 47.4% female.

== Education ==
Its school district is Columbia 93 School District.
