= Shaw, Missouri =

Shaw
- Unincorporated community
- Location within the state of Missouri
- Coordinates: 38°58′25″N 92°12′12″W
- Country: United States
- State: Missouri
- County: Boone
- Time zone: UTC-6 (Central (CST))
  - Summer (DST): UTC-5 (CDT)
- GNIS feature ID: 752099

Shaw is an unincorporated community in the Two-Mile Prairie of Boone County, Missouri, United States, northeast of Columbia. It is located at 38°58′25″N 92°12′12″W (38.9736517, -92.2032379).

== History ==
A post office called Shaw was established in 1894, and remained in operation until 1907. The community has the name of S. M. Shaw, a local landowner.
