= Hallsville, Missouri =

- City
- City of Hallsville
- Logo
- Nickname: 'H-Town'
- Motto: "The small town with a big heart!"
- Location of Hallsville, Missouri
- Coordinates: 39°07′10″N 92°13′36″W
- Country: United States
- State: Missouri
- County: Boone
- Founded: 1866

Government
  - Mayor: Kate Boatright

Area
  - Total: 1.59 sq mi (4.13 km^{2})
  - Land: 1.59 sq mi (4.13 km^{2})
  - Water: 0 sq mi (0.00 km^{2})
- Elevation: 899 ft (274 m)

Population (2020)
  - Total: 1,614
  - Estimate (2023): 1,722
  - Density: 1,011.3/sq mi (390.45/km^{2})
- Time zone: UTC-6 (Central (CST))
  - Summer (DST): UTC-5 (CDT)
- ZIP code: 65255
- Area code: 573
- FIPS code: 29-29998
- GNIS feature ID: 2394270
- Website: City of Hallsville

Hallsville is a city in Boone County, Missouri. It is part of the Columbia metropolitan area. The population was 1,614 at the time of the 2020 census. Southeast of the town is Mount Zion Church and Cemetery, the site of the Battle of Mount Zion Church during the Civil War.

== History ==
Hallsville was laid out in 1866. It was named for its first postmaster, Judge John W. Hall. The town was not platted originally, having grown naturally at a crossroads around a store and blacksmith. The Columbia Terminal Railroad platted the town of Hickman and installed a depot a half mile south, but Hallsville grew and Hickman did not.

Colonel William F. Switzler reported that in 1882, Hallsville contained five stores, one harness shop and one blacksmith shop, but no church or school house yet. The population was 65. During the Civil War, on 22 September 1863, the Mount Zion Church east of Hallsville was burned by northern troops. According to one claim by William Franklin Switzler, this was because Iowa Lieutenant Hartman found the church to be a "bushwhacker's nest." The church was rebuilt in 1867, torn down and rebuilt in 1903, and still stands. Hallsville is also the hometown to the famous painter in the 20th century Charles Morgenthaler. Charles Morgenthaler received his art education at the University of Missouri and the Art Institute of Chicago. He later moved to St. Louis, where he became a successful illustrator and mural painter.

== Geography ==
According to the United States Census Bureau, the city has a total area of 1.33 square miles (3.44 km^{2}), all land.

== Demographics ==
Historical population
Census	Pop.	Note	%±
1880	60		—
1890	92		53.3%
1900	157		70.7%
1910	195		24.2%
1920	225		15.4%
1930	212		−5.8%
1940	224		5.7%
1950	225		0.4%
1960	363		61.3%
1970	790		117.6%
1980	850		7.6%
1990	917		7.9%
2000	978		6.7%
2010	1,491		52.5%
2020	1,614		8.2%
U.S. Decennial Census

=== 2020 census ===
As of the 2020 census, Hallsville had a population of 1,614. The median age was 36.4 years. 28.9% of residents were under the age of 18 and 16.0% of residents were 65 years of age or older. For every 100 females there were 86.4 males, and for every 100 females age 18 and over there were 76.9 males age 18 and over.

0.0% of residents lived in urban areas, while 100.0% lived in rural areas.

There were 649 households in Hallsville, of which 39.4% had children under the age of 18 living in them. Of all households, 49.2% were married-couple households, 11.9% were households with a male householder and no spouse or partner present, and 32.4% were households with a female householder and no spouse or partner present. About 28.6% of all households were made up of individuals and 15.1% had someone living alone who was 65 years of age or older.

There were 698 housing units, of which 7.0% were vacant. The homeowner vacancy rate was 2.0% and the rental vacancy rate was 6.3%.

Racial composition as of the 2020 census
Race	Number	Percent
White	1,476	91.4%
Black or African American	21	1.3%
American Indian and Alaska Native	3	0.2%
Asian	1	0.1%
Native Hawaiian and Other Pacific Islander	1	0.1%
Some other race	14	0.9%
Two or more races	98	6.1%
Hispanic or Latino (of any race)	24	1.5%

=== 2010 census ===
As of the census of 2010, there were 1,491 people, 586 households, and 397 families living in the city. The population density was 1,121.1 inhabitants per square mile (432.9/km^{2}). There were 615 housing units at an average density of 462.4 per square mile (178.5/km^{2}). The racial makeup of the city was 96.8% White, 0.9% African American, 0.1% Native American, 0.1% Pacific Islander, 0.4% from other races, and 1.7% from two or more races. Hispanic or Latino of any race were 1.6% of the population.

There were 586 households, of which 41.8% had children under the age of 18 living with them, 48.6% were married couples living together, 14.0% had a female householder with no husband present, 5.1% had a male householder with no wife present, and 32.3% were non-families. 27.0% of all households were made up of individuals, and 12% had someone living alone who was 65 years of age or older. The average household size was 2.53 and the average family size was 3.06.

The median age in the city was 34.7 years. 30.8% of residents were under the age of 18; 5.5% were between the ages of 18 and 24; 28.5% were from 25 to 44; 22.2% were from 45 to 64; and 12.9% were 65 years of age or older. The gender makeup of the city was 47.8% male and 52.2% female.

=== 2000 census ===
As of the census of 2000, there were 978 people, 404 households, and 275 families living in the city. The population density was 1,334.2 inhabitants per square mile (515.1/km^{2}). There were 439 housing units at an average density of 598.9 per square mile (231.2/km^{2}). The racial makeup of the city was 96.42% White, 1.53% African American, 0.61% Native American, 0.31% from other races, and 1.12% from two or more races. Hispanic or Latino of any race were 0.72% of the population.

There were 404 households, out of which 37.6% had children under the age of 18 living with them, 52.7% were married couples living together, 12.4% had a female householder with no husband present, and 31.9% were non-families. 28.0% of all households were made up of individuals, and 12.4% had someone living alone who was 65 years of age or older. The average household size was 2.42 and the average family size was 2.98.

In the city, the population was spread out, with 29.7% under the age of 18, 5.9% from 18 to 24, 30.8% from 25 to 44, 22.9% from 45 to 64, and 10.7% who were 65 years of age or older. The median age was 34 years. For every 100 females, there were 85.6 males. For every 100 females age 18 and over, there were 77.8 males.

The median income for a household in the city was $35,536, and the median income for a family was $49,531. Males had a median income of $30,417 versus $25,227 for females. The per capita income for the city was $18,282. About 2.6% of families and 6.6% of the population were below the poverty line, including 8.2% of those under age 18 and 11.3% of those age 65 or over.

== Education ==
The Hallsville R-IV School District, which covers the municipality, operates a primary, elementary, intermediate, and Hallsville High Schools.
