= Claysville, Boone County, Missouri =

Unincorporated community in Missouri, U.S.

Coordinates: 38°39′41″N 92°15′34″W

Claysville is an unincorporated community in Boone County, in the U.S. state of Missouri. It is the southernmost settlement in Boone County. Claysville is near the Missouri River.

== History ==
Claysville was laid out in 1844, and named after Henry Clay, the Kentucky statesman. A post office called Claysville was established in 1850, and remained in operation until 1908.
