= Deer Park, Missouri =

Unincorporated community in Missouri, U.S.

Coordinates: 38°51′41″N 92°15′01″W

Deer Park is an unincorporated community in Boone County, in the U.S. state of Missouri. It is located south of Columbia on U.S. Route 63.

== History ==
A post office called Deer Park was established in 1886, and remained in operation until 1907. The community was named for the abundance of deer in a nature reserve park near the original town site. It is near the present day Three Creeks Conservation Area.
