= Midway, Boone County, Missouri =

Unincorporated community in Missouri, U.S.

Coordinates: 38°59′06″N 92°26′58″W

Midway is an unincorporated community in Boone County, Missouri, United States.

== History ==
Midway was so named because of its position midway between St. Louis and Kansas City. A post office called Midway was established in 1869, and remained in operation until 1908. Today, Midway is home to several companies and businesses, including MidwayUSA, Midway Travel Plaza, and Spirit of '76 Fireworks. The Columbia Public Schools district also operates an elementary school for the area, named Midway Heights Elementary.
