= Wilton, Missouri =

Unincorporated community in Missouri, U.S.

Coordinates: 38°44′06″N 92°21′33″W

Wilton is an unincorporated community in southwest Boone County, in the U.S. state of Missouri. The community is on the northeast bank of the Missouri River across from the Marion Bottoms Conservation Area. Ashland lies approximately six miles to the northeast on Missouri Route M and Sandy Hook lies across the Missouri three miles to the west in Moniteau County. The lone business in Wilton is the Riverview Store, which serves the local community and users on the Katy Trail.

== History ==
A post office called Wilton was established in 1875, and remained in operation until 1925. The community was named after J. Wilton, a county official.
