= Englewood, Missouri =

Unincorporated community in Missouri, U.S.

Coordinates: 38.821705°N 92.184351°W

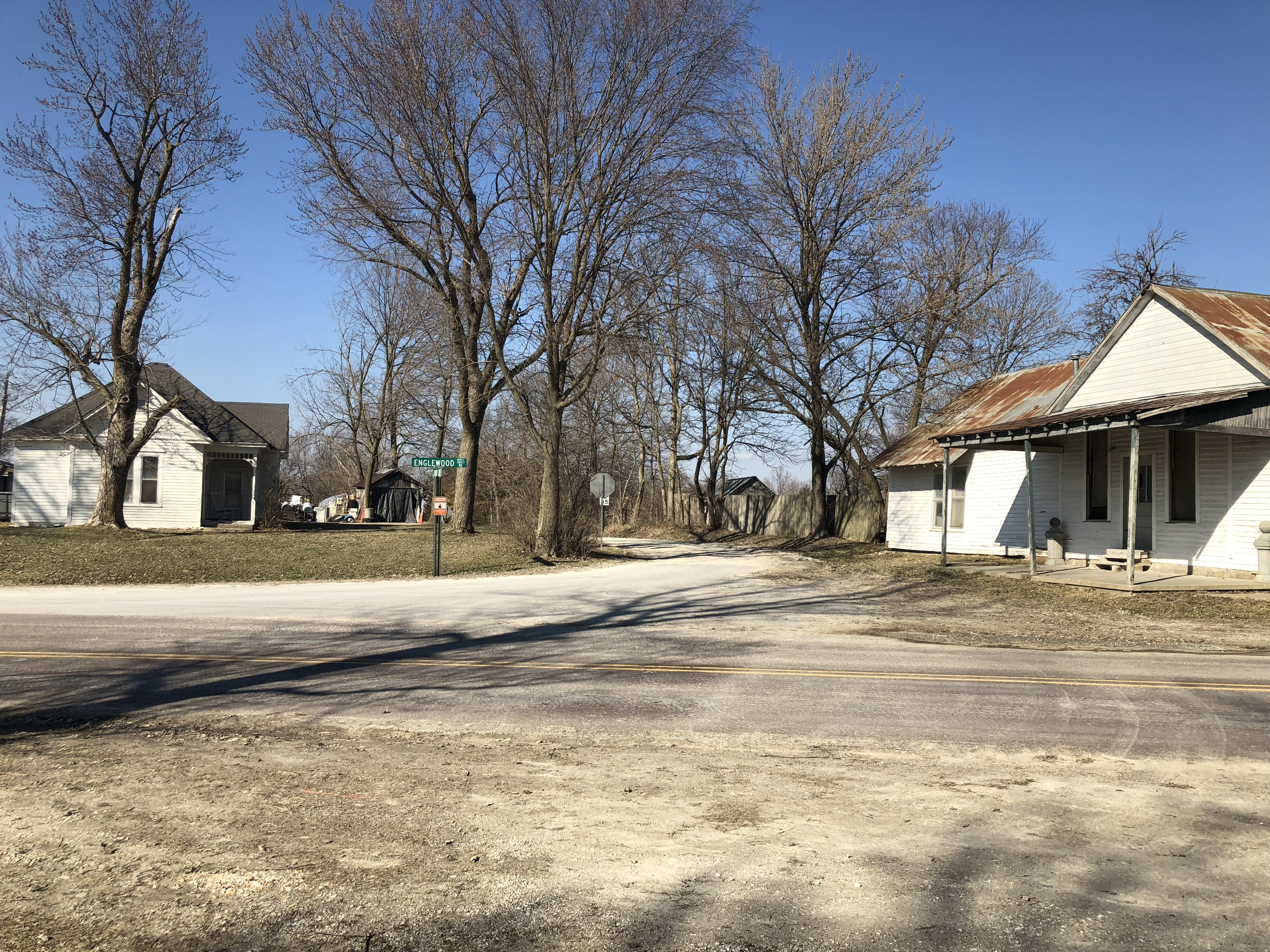
Englewood in March 2019

Englewood is an unincorporated community in Boone County, in the U.S. state of Missouri.

== History ==
A post office called Englewood was established in 1892, and remained in operation until 1906. The community was named after Englewood, Illinois.
