= Perche Creek =

Stream in the U.S. state of Missouri

Coordinates: 38°49′13″N 92°23′26″W

Perche Creek, or Roche Perche Creek is a stream in Boone and Randolph counties in the U.S. state of Missouri. Besides the Missouri River it is the largest stream in Boone County, Missouri and forms much of the western border of the city of Columbia, Missouri. The northern source is in southeast Randolph County approximately six miles south of Moberly.

Perche Creek was named for a natural bridge on a cliff of the Missouri River near the former location of the mouth of the Perche. The Missouri French called it Roche Perche ("pierced rock") and the Kentuckians and Virginians who settled Boone County adopted the name from them. Currently the Roche Perche flows into the Missouri River about a mile north of Providence.

== See also ==
- List of rivers of Missouri
