= Hartsburg, Missouri =

- Village
- Village of Hartsburg
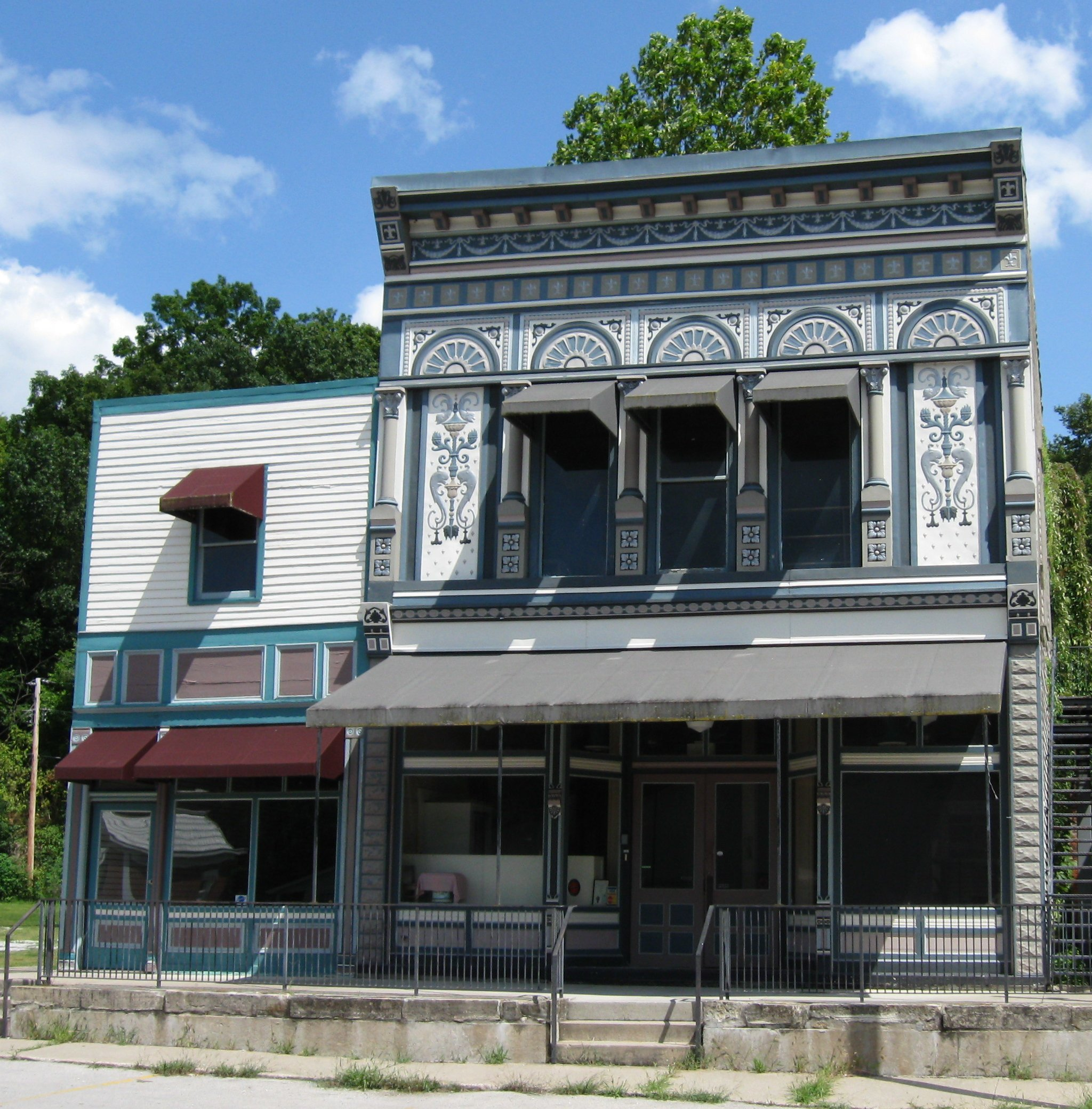
- Hackman Building

- Location of Hartsburg, Missouri
- Coordinates: 38°41′50″N 92°18′25″W
- Country: United States
- State: Missouri
- County: Boone

Area
  - Total: 0.22 sq mi (0.56 km^{2})
  - Land: 0.22 sq mi (0.56 km^{2})
  - Water: 0 sq mi (0.00 km^{2})
- Elevation: 591 ft (180 m)

Population (2020)
  - Total: 133
  - Density: 618.3/sq mi (238.73/km^{2})
- Time zone: UTC-6 (Central (CST))
  - Summer (DST): UTC-5 (CDT)
- ZIP code: 65039
- Area code: 573
- FIPS code: 29-30718
- GNIS feature ID: 2396989
- Website: www.hartsburgpumpkinfest.com

Hartsburg is a village in southern Boone County, Missouri, United States. It is part of the Columbia, Missouri Metropolitan Statistical Area. The population was 133 per the 2020 census.

== History ==
Hartsburg was named for Luther D. Hart, a pioneer settler.

== Geography ==
Hartsburg is located above the Missouri River bottom on Missouri Route A. The city of Marion in Cole County lies due west across the Missouri River. The community of Ashland lies about six miles to the northeast on U.S. Route 63. Hart Creek flows past the west side of the community.

According to the United States Census Bureau, the village has a total area of 0.21 square miles (0.54 km^{2}), all land.

== Demographics ==
Historical population
Census	Pop.	Note	%±
1910	175		—
1920	211		20.6%
1930	155		−26.5%
1940	154		−0.6%
1950	171		11.0%
1960	158		−7.6%
1970	120		−24.1%
1980	118		−1.7%
1990	131		11.0%
2000	108		−17.6%
2010	103		−4.6%
2020	133		29.1%
U.S. Decennial Census

=== 2010 census ===
As of the census of 2010, there were 103 people, 48 households, and 20 families living in the village. The population density was 490.5 inhabitants per square mile (189.4/km^{2}). There were 59 housing units at an average density of 281.0 per square mile (108.5/km^{2}). The racial makeup of the village was 94.2% White, 2.9% African American, 1.0% Native American, 1.0% Asian, and 1.0% from two or more races. Hispanic or Latino of any race were 1.9% of the population.

There were 48 households, of which 20.8% had children under the age of 18 living with them, 35.4% were married couples living together, 6.3% had a female householder with no husband present, and 58.3% were non-families. 52.1% of all households were made up of individuals, and 16.7% had someone living alone who was 65 years of age or older. The average household size was 2.15 and the average family size was 3.30.

The median age in the village was 41.6 years. 18.4% of residents were under the age of 18; 7.9% were between the ages of 18 and 24; 29.1% were from 25 to 44; 24.3% were from 45 to 64; and 20.4% were 65 years of age or older. The gender makeup of the village was 51.5% male and 48.5% female.

=== 2000 census ===
As of the census of 2000, there were 108 people, 54 households, and 30 families living in the town. The population density was 1,327.0 inhabitants per square mile (512.4/km^{2}). There were 59 housing units at an average density of 724.9 per square mile (279.9/km^{2}). The racial makeup of the town was 89.81% White, 0.93% Native American, 2.78% from other races, and 6.48% from two or more races. Hispanic or Latino of any race were 2.78% of the population.

There were 54 households, out of which 20.4% had children under the age of 18 living with them, 46.3% were married couples living together, 5.6% had a female householder with no husband present, and 44.4% were non-families. 38.9% of all households were made up of individuals, and 20.4% had someone living alone who was 65 years of age or older. The average household size was 2.00 and the average family size was 2.67.

In the town the population was spread out, with 16.7% under the age of 18, 5.6% from 18 to 24, 26.9% from 25 to 44, 29.6% from 45 to 64, and 21.3% who were 65 years of age or older. The median age was 45 years. For every 100 females, there were 120.4 males. For every 100 females age 18 and over, there were 95.7 males.

The median income for a household in the town was $32,500, and the median income for a family was $52,917. Males had a median income of $30,000 versus $21,875 for females. The per capita income for the town was $16,739. There were no families and 5.8% of the population living below the poverty line, including no under eighteens and 9.5% of those over 64.

== Recreation ==
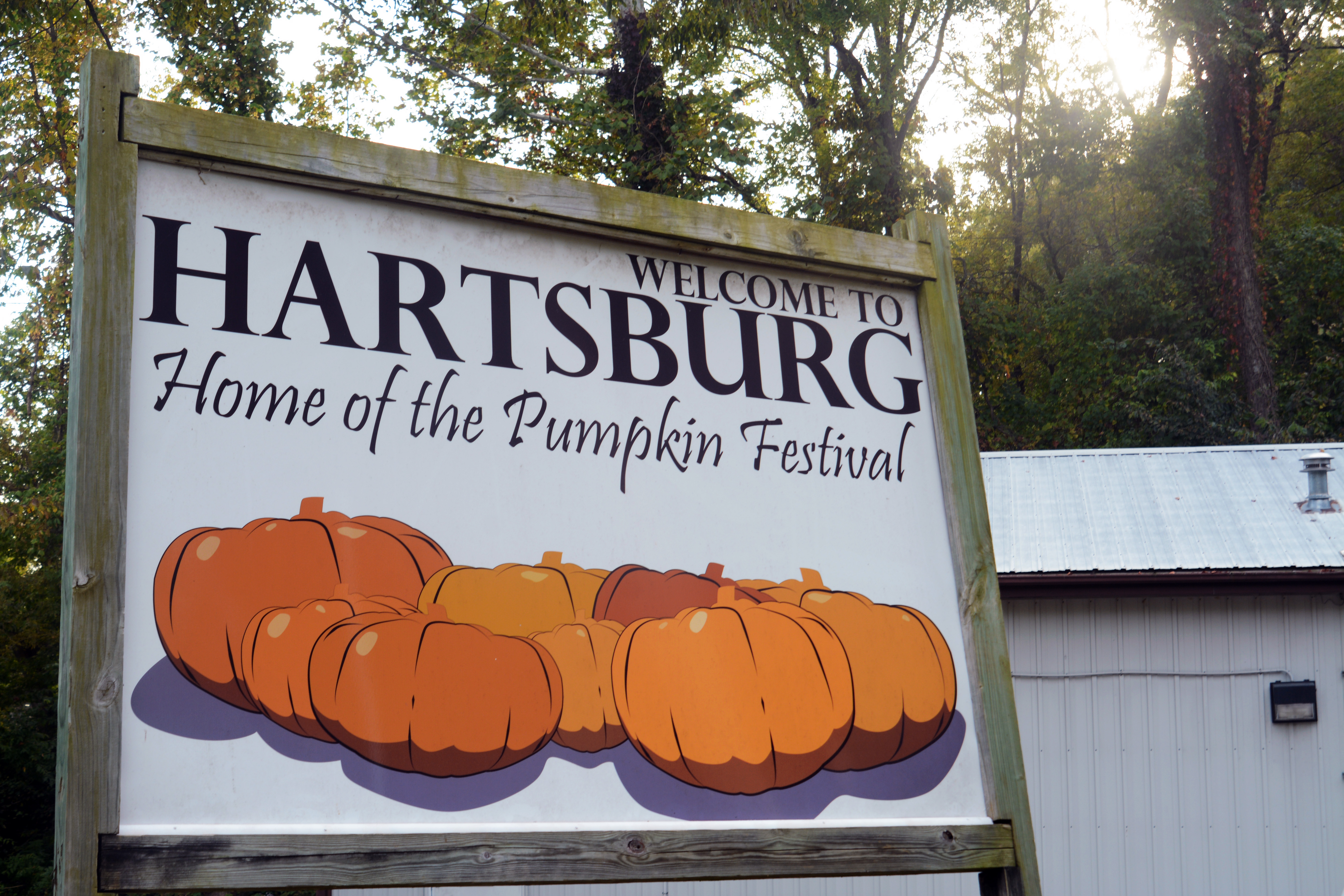
The Hartsburg Pumpkin Festival in 2015

The Katy Trail, a 240-mile-long bike path stretching across the state of Missouri, runs along the edge of the Missouri River floodplain past Hartsburg.

The Hartsburg Pumpkin Festival is held each year on the second Saturday and Sunday of October, which includes games, foods, and crafts. Each year during the festival tens of thousands come to eat and shop at the numerous venues and food booths.

== Education ==
It is in the Southern Boone County R-I School District.

== Notable sites ==
- The Samuel E. Hackman Building is a historic building in Hartsburg.

== Notable people ==
- Lucas Kunce, politician

== See also ==
- Hart Creek Conservation Area
