= Boone County, Missouri =

County in Missouri, United States

- County
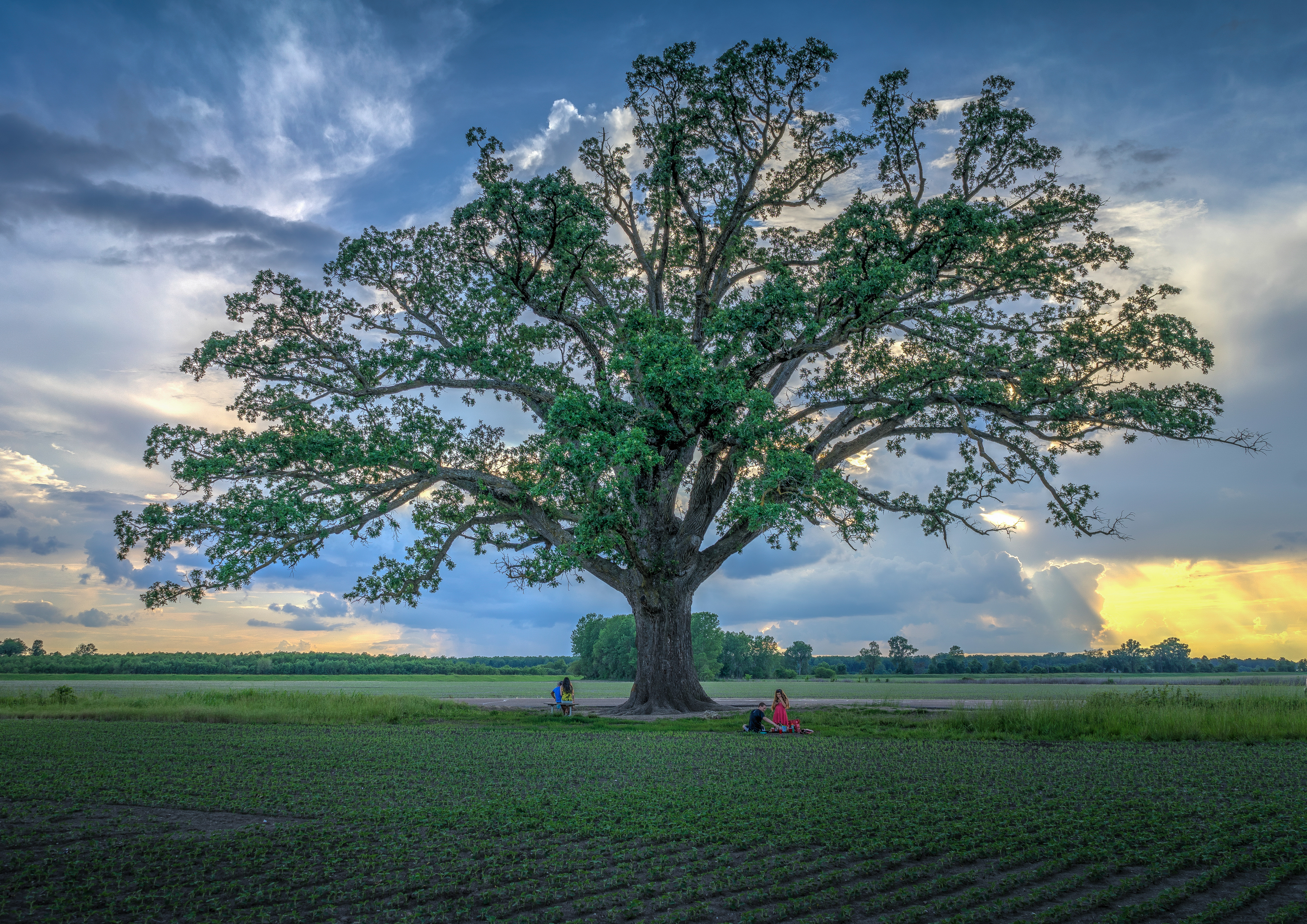
- The (Big) Burr Oak Tree in the Missouri River floodplain near the City of Columbia

- Seal

- Location within the U.S. state of Missouri
- Coordinates: 38°56′54″N 92°20′02″W
- Country: United States
- State: Missouri
- Founded: November 16, 1820
- Named for: Daniel Boone (1734–1820)
- Seat: (Columbia, Missouri) Columbia
- Largest city: (Columbia, Missouri) Columbia

Area
  - Total: 691 sq mi (1,790 km^{2})
  - Land: 685 sq mi (1,770 km^{2})
  - Water: 5.6 sq mi (15 km^{2}) 0.8%

Population (2020)
  - Total: 183,610
  - Estimate (2025): 191,746 ▲
  - Density: 268/sq mi (103/km^{2})
- Time zone: UTC−6 (Central)
  - Summer (DST): UTC−5 (CDT)
- ZIP Codes: 65010, 65039, 65201, 65202, 65203, 65205, 65211, 65212, 65215, 65216, 65217, 65218, 65240, 65255, 65256, 65279, 65284, 65299,
- Congressional districts: 3rd, 4th
- Website: www.boonemo.gov

Boone County is located in the U.S. state of Missouri. Centrally located the state's Mid-Missouri region, its county seat is in Columbia, which is Missouri's fourth-largest city and location of the University of Missouri. As of the 2020 U.S. census, the county's population was listed as 183,610, making it the state's eighth-most populous county or county equivalent. The county was organized November 16, 1820, removed from the former larger Howard County (now to the northwest) of the old federal Missouri Territory of 1812–1821, and named for the famous Western explorer and settler of Kentucky, then recently deceased Daniel Boone (1734–1820), whose kin largely populated the Boonslick area, having arrived in the 1810s on the Boone's Lick Road.

Boone County comprises the Columbia Metropolitan Area. The towns of Ashland and Centralia are the second and third most populous towns in the county.

== History ==
Boone County was organized November 16, 1820, from a separated portion of the larger territorial Howard County, first designated under the former federal Louisiana Territory (1804–1812) and subsequent successor Missouri Territory (1812–1821). The central region of the state is known as Mid-Missouri and is also known as the cultural area of Boonslick or Boone's Lick Country, because of a nearby salt spring or "lick" which famed Western American frontier explorer, pioneer, settler Daniel Boone's (1734–1820) sons, Daniel Morgan Boone (1769–1839), and younger Nathan Boone (1780–1856), used for their animals stock.

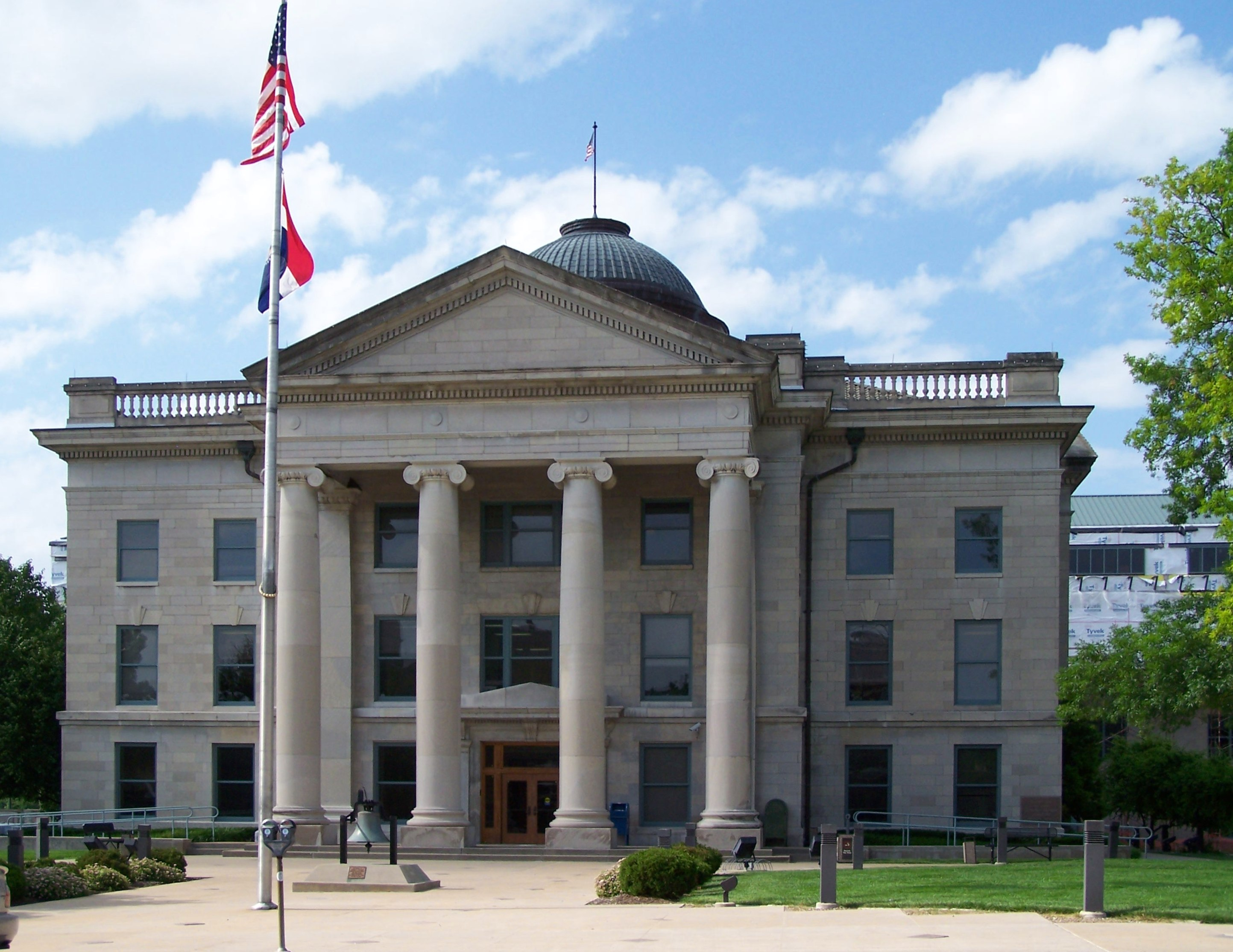
The Boone County Courthouse of Greek Revival style architecture, built with three stories and basement, with front portico / pediment and columns, at the surrounding Boone County Government Complex, in the county seat town of Columbia, Missouri

Boone County was settled primarily from the Upper South states of Kentucky, Tennessee and further east of Virginia. The settlers brought slaves and idea of slave-holding with them, and quickly started cultivating crops similar to those in Middle Tennessee and the bluegrass state of Kentucky: hemp and tobacco. Boone was one of several counties to the north and south of the diagonal flowing southwestward Missouri River that was settled by mostly Southerners. Because of its culture and traditions, the area became known as Little Dixie, and Boone County was at its heart. In 1860 slaves made up 25 percent or more of the county's population, Boone County was strongly pro-Confederacy during the American Civil War (1861–1865).

Shortly after the assassination / murder in April 1865, of 16th President Abraham Lincoln (1809–1865, served 1861–1865), the leading citizens of the county and its county seat town denounced the killing. They also directed that all public buildings including the county courthouse and the nearby state university be draped in black mourning for thirty days.

== Geography ==
According to the U.S. Census Bureau, the county has a total area of 691 square miles (1,790 km^{2}), of which 685 square miles (1,770 km^{2}) is land and 5.6 square miles (15 km^{2}) (0.8%) is water. The Missouri River makes up the southern border of the county.

=== National protected areas ===
- Big Muddy National Fish and Wildlife Refuge
- Mark Twain National Forest (part)

=== Adjacent counties ===
- Audrain County (northeast)
- Callaway County (east)
- Cole County (south)
- Cooper County (west)
- Howard County (northwest)
- Moniteau County (southwest)
- Randolph County (north)

=== Major highways ===
- Interstate 70
- Interstate 70 Business Loop
- U.S. Route 40
- U.S. Route 63
- US 63 Conn.
- Route 22
- Route 124
- Route 163
- Route 740
- Route 763

== Demographics ==
Historical population
Census	Pop.	Note	%±
1820	3,692		—
1830	8,859		140.0%
1840	13,561		53.1%
1850	14,979		10.5%
1860	19,486		30.1%
1870	20,765		6.6%
1880	25,422		22.4%
1890	26,043		2.4%
1900	28,642		10.0%
1910	30,533		6.6%
1920	29,672		−2.8%
1930	30,995		4.5%
1940	34,991		12.9%
1950	48,432		38.4%
1960	55,202		14.0%
1970	80,911		46.6%
1980	100,376		24.1%
1990	112,379		12.0%
2000	135,454		20.5%
2010	162,642		20.1%
2020	183,610		12.9%
2025 (est.)	191,746	▲	4.4%
U.S. Decennial Census; 1790–1960 1900–1990; 1990–2000 2010–2020

=== 2020 census ===
As of the 2020 census, the county had a population of 183,610. The median age was 31.9 years. 20.9% of residents were under the age of 18 and 13.2% of residents were 65 years of age or older. For every 100 females there were 94.1 males, and for every 100 females age 18 and over there were 91.5 males age 18 and over. 77.2% of residents lived in urban areas, while 22.8% lived in rural areas.

The racial makeup of the county was 76.2% White, 9.9% Black or African American, 0.3% American Indian and Alaska Native, 4.3% Asian, 0.1% Native Hawaiian and Pacific Islander, 2.0% from some other race, and 7.3% from two or more races. Hispanic or Latino residents of any race comprised 4.4% of the population.

There were 73,470 households in the county, of which 27.7% had children under the age of 18 living with them and 29.6% had a female householder with no spouse or partner present. About 31.6% of all households were made up of individuals and 8.8% had someone living alone who was 65 years of age or older.

There were 79,836 housing units, of which 8.0% were vacant. Among occupied housing units, 54.2% were owner-occupied and 45.8% were renter-occupied. The homeowner vacancy rate was 1.5% and the rental vacancy rate was 8.8%.

=== 2020 census ===
Boone County, Missouri – Racial and ethnic composition Note: the US Census treats Hispanic/Latino as an ethnic category. This table excludes Latinos from the racial categories and assigns them to a separate category. Hispanics/Latinos may be of any race.
Race / Ethnicity (NH = Non-Hispanic)	Pop 1980	Pop 1990	Pop 2000	Pop 2010	Pop 2020	% 1980	% 1990	% 2000	% 2010	% 2020
White alone (NH)	91,086	99,275	114,367	131,677	137,771	90.74%	88.34%	84.43%	80.96%	75.03%
Black or African American alone (NH)	6,377	8,306	11,479	14,943	17,882	6.35%	7.39%	8.47%	9.19%	9.74%
Native American or Alaska Native alone (NH)	188	374	524	523	452	0.19%	0.33%	0.39%	0.32%	0.25%
Asian alone (NH)	1,090	3,093	4,000	6,112	7,772	1.09%	2.75%	2.95%	3.76%	4.23%
Native Hawaiian or Pacific Islander alone (NH)	x	x	40	82	120	x	x	0.03%	0.05%	0.07%
Other race alone (NH)	662	105	255	314	990	0.66%	0.09%	0.19%	0.19%	0.54%
Mixed race or Multiracial (NH)	x	x	2,376	4,096	10,571	x	x	1.75%	2.52%	5.76%
Hispanic or Latino (any race)	973	1,226	2,413	4,895	8,052	0.97%	1.09%	1.78%	3.01%	4.39%
Total	100,376	112,379	135,454	162,642	183,610	100.00%	100.00%	100.00%	100.00%	100.00%

=== 2000 census ===
As of the 2000 census, there were 135,454 people, 53,094 households, and 31,378 families residing in the county. The population density was 198 inhabitants per square mile (76/km^{2}). There were 56,678 housing units at an average density of 83 units per square mile (32/km^{2}). The racial makeup of the county was 85.43% White, 8.54% Black or African American, 0.42% Native American, 2.96% Asian, 0.03% Pacific Islander, 0.69% from other races, and 1.93% from two or more races. Approximately 1.78% of the population were Hispanic or Latino of any race. 24.6% claimed German, 12.3% American, 11.2% English and 9.8% Irish ancestry.

There were 53,094 households, out of which 30.30% had children under the age of 18 living with them, 45.50% were married couples living together, 10.40% had a female householder with no husband present, and 40.90% were non-families. 28.70% of all households were made up of individuals, and 6.20% had someone living alone who was 65 years of age or older. The average household size was 2.38 and the average family size was 2.97.

In the county, the population was spread out, with 22.80% under the age of 18, 19.90% from 18 to 24, 29.90% from 25 to 44, 18.80% from 45 to 64, and 8.60% who were 65 years of age or older. The median age was 30 years. For every 100 females, there were 93.50 males. For every 100 females age 18 and over, there were 90.90 males.

The median income for a household in the county was $37,485, and the median income for a family was $51,210. Males had a median income of $33,304 versus $25,990 for females. The per capita income for the county was $19,844. About 7.60% of families and 14.50% of the population were below the poverty line, including 12.10% of those under age 18 and 5.90% of those age 65 or over.

=== Religion ===
According to the Association of Religion Data Archives County Membership Report (2010), Boone County is sometimes regarded as being on the northern edge of the so-called Bible Belt, with evangelical Protestantism being the most predominant religious faith represented. The most predominant denominations among residents in Boone County who adhere to a religion are the Baptists with the largest being from the conservative Southern Baptist Convention (20.81%), Roman Catholics (16.71%), and smaller / minor nondenominational or evangelical groups (13.23%).

== Education ==
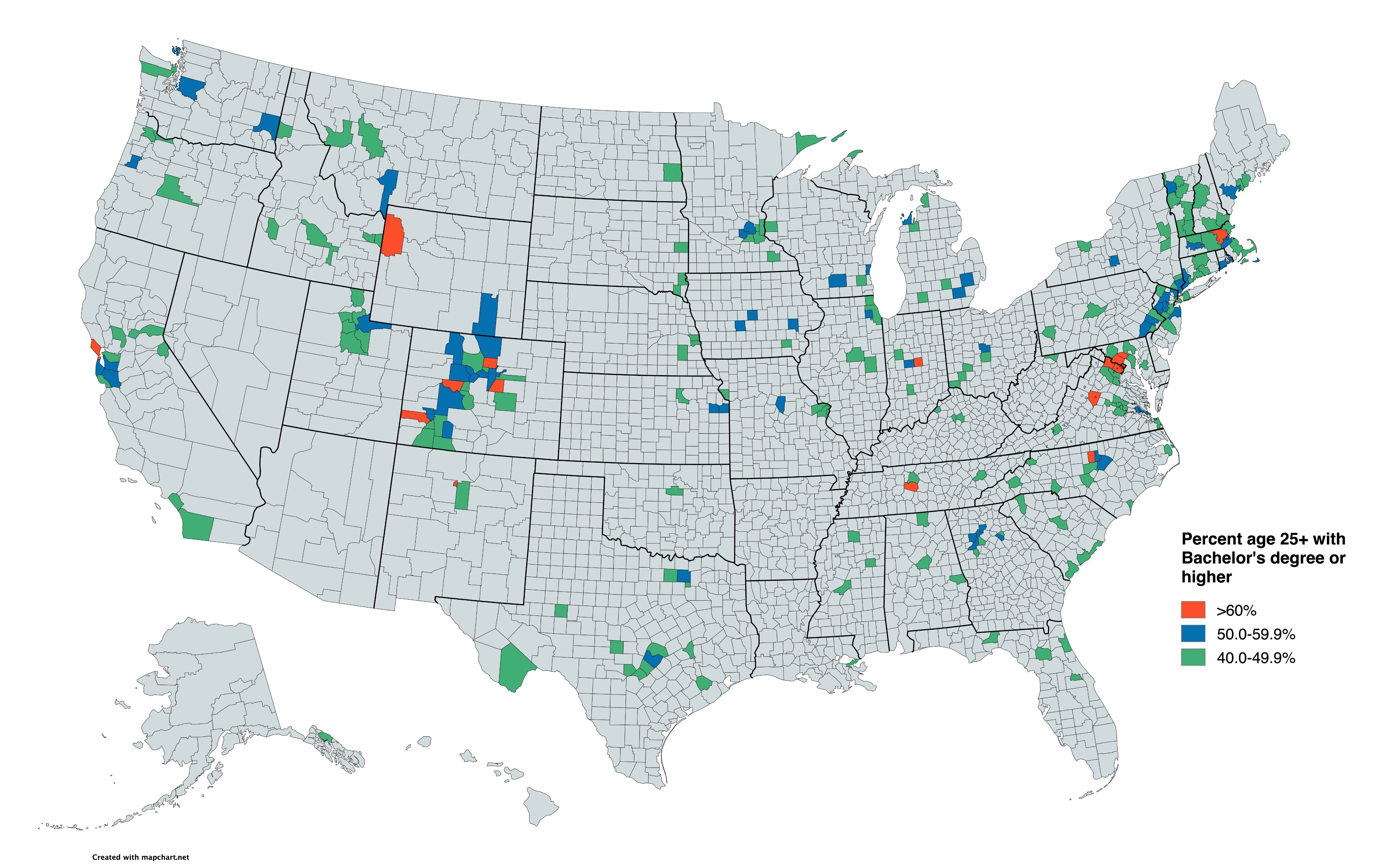
A map of the most college-educated counties in the United States

Boone County is the most highly educated county in Missouri. A majority of adult residents over the age of 25 have bachelor's degrees.

School districts in the county, including those based in other counties that cover portions of this one, include:

- Columbia Public Schools
- Centralia R-VI School District
- Fayette R-III School District
- Hallsville R-IV School District
- Harrisburg R-VIII School District
- New Franklin R-I School District
- North Callaway County R-I School District
- Southern Boone County R-I School District
- Sturgeon R-V School District

=== Public schools ===
- Southern Boone R-I School District - Ashland
  - Southern Boone Primary School (PK-02)
  - Southern Boone Elementary (03-05)
  - Southern Boone Middle School (06-08)
  - Southern Boone High School (09-12)
- Centralia R-VI School District – Centralia
  - Chance Elementary School (PK-02)
  - Centralia Intermediate School (03-05)
  - Chester Boren Middle School (06-08)
  - Centralia High School (09-12)
- Columbia School District No. 93 – Columbia
  - Center for Gifted Education (01-05)
  - Cedar Ridge Elementary School (PK-05)
  - Thomas Benton Elementary School (PK-05)
  - John Ridgeway Elementary School (K-05)
  - Alpha Hart Lewis Elementary School (PK-05)
  - Midway Heights Elementary School (PK-05)
  - Ulysses S. Grant Elementary School (PK-05)
  - Two Mile Prairie Elementary School (PK-05)
  - New Haven Elementary School (PK-05)
  - West Boulevard Elementary School (PK-05)
  - Locust Street Expressive Arts Elementary School
  - Parkade Elementary School (PK-05)
  - Blue Ridge Elementary School (PK-05)
  - Fairview Elementary School (PK-05)
  - Rock Bridge Elementary School (PK-05)
  - Russell Boulevard Elementary School (PK-05)
  - Shepard Boulevard Elementary School (PK-05)
  - Mary Paxton Keeley Elementary School (PK-05)
  - Beulah Ralph Elementary School (PK-05)
  - Eliot Battle Elementary School (PK-05)
  - Derby Ridge Elementary School (PK-05)
  - Mill Creek Elementary School (PK-05)
  - John B. Lange Middle School (06-08)
  - Ann Hawkins Gentry Middle School (06-08)
  - Smithton Middle School (06-08)
  - Oakland Middle School (06-08)
  - Jefferson Middle School (06-08)
  - West Middle School (06-08)
  - Warner Middle School (06-08)
  - Hickman High School (09-12)
  - Battle High School (09-12)
  - Frederick Douglass High School (09-12) – Alternative School
  - Rock Bridge High School (09-12)
- Hallsville R-IV School District – Hallsville
  - Hallsville Primary School (PK-01)
  - Hallsville Intermediate School (02-05)
  - Hallsville Middle School (06-08)
  - Hallsville High School (09-12)
- Harrisburg R-VIII School District – Harrisburg
  - Harrisburg Elementary School (PK-06)
  - Harrisburg Middle School (07-08)
  - Harrisburg High School (09-12)
- Sturgeon R-V School District – Sturgeon
  - Sturgeon Elementary School (K-04)
  - Sturgeon Middle School (05-08)
  - Sturgeon High School (09-12)

=== Private schools ===
- Apple School – Columbia (PK-K) – Nonsectarian
- Children's House And Windsor Street Montessori – Columbia (PK-06) – Nonsectarian – Coed
- Christian Chapel Academy – Columbia (K-08) – Pentecostal
- Christian Fellowship School – Columbia (PK-12) – Nondenominational Christian
- College Park Christian Academy – Columbia (K-09) – Seventh-day Adventist
- Our Lady of Lourdes Interparish School– Columbia (K-08) – Roman Catholic
- Columbia Independent School – Columbia (PK-12) – Nonsectarian
- Columbia KinderCare – Columbia (NS-PK) – Nonsectarian
- Columbia Montessori School – Columbia (PK-K) – Nonsectarian
- Father Tolton Regional High School - Columbia (09-12) – Roman Catholic
- Good Shepherd Lutheran School – Columbia (K-08) – Lutheran
- Heritage Academy – Columbia (03-12) – Nondenominational Christian – Alternative School
- Islamic School of Columbia, Missouri – Columbia (K-05) – Muslim
- Morningside Community School – Columbia (05-07) – Nonsectarian
- Shalom Christian Academy – Columbia (PK-12) – Nonsectarian
- Harrisburg Early Learning Center – Harrisburg (NS/PK-06)
- Sunnydale Adventist Academy – Centralia (09-12) – Seventh-day Adventist

=== Post-secondary (colleges / University / community college) ===
- University of Missouri at Columbia, A public, nationally renowned four-year flagship state university, established 1839.
- Columbia College – Columbia A private, four-year university, founded 1851.
- Stephens College – (Columbia), A private, four-year all-women university, founded 1833.
- Moberly Area Community College (MACC), in Moberly, Missouri, established 1927, a two-year public community college, operates four satellite campuses, including one in Columbia.

=== Public libraries ===
- Centralia Public Library
- Southern Boone County Public Library
- Columbia Public Library

== Communities ==
=== Cities ===
- Ashland
- Centralia
- Columbia (county seat)
- Hallsville
- Rocheport
- Sturgeon

=== Villages ===
- Harrisburg
- Hartsburg
- Huntsdale
- McBaine
- Pierpont

=== Unincorporated communities ===
- Bourbon
- Browns
- Claysville
- Deer Park
- Easley
- Englewood
- Ginlet
- Harg
- Hinton
- Oldham
- Midway
- Prathersville
- Providence
- Riggs
- Rucker
- Shaw
- Two Mile Prairie
- Wilton
- Woodlandville

=== Townships ===
Township boundaries have changed over time. See links at end of article for maps of Boone County showing boundaries of different dates. As a rule, older townships were split, with newer townships created from their subdivisions. This is significant for historical and genealogical research. Note that maps show changes in township boundaries between 1898 and 1930 were minimal.

- Bourbon
- Cedar
- Centralia
- Columbia
- Katy
- Missouri
- Perche
- Rock Bridge
- Rocky Fork
- Three Creeks

== Politics ==
There are 127,433 registered voters in Boone County as of 2022.

=== Political culture ===
As a county anchored by a college town, Boone holds a Democratic tendency at the local, state, and federal levels. It is the only Democratic stronghold in Missouri outside of Greater St. Louis and the Kansas City metropolitan area.

Boone County is also very progressive on ballot measures, voting for Medicaid expansion in 2020 and legal abortion in 2024, unlike all of its neighboring counties. Both amendments only narrowly passed statewide, making Boone County's votes crucial.

No Republican has won Boone County at the presidential level since George W. Bush very narrowly did in 2004, let alone with a majority since landslide victor Ronald Reagan in 1984; at the U.S. Senate level since Roy Blunt in 2010; nor at the gubernatorial level since the popular John Ashcroft (who won the county both terms) in his 1988 landslide re-election.

=== Local ===
Like nearly all other U.S. counties housing a major university, the Democratic Party predominantly controls politics at the local level in Boone County. Democrats currently hold all of the elected county-wide positions.

Boone County, Missouri

Elected countywide officials
Assessor	Kenny Mohr	Democratic
Auditor	Kyle Rieman	Democratic
Circuit Clerk	Sherry Terrell	Democratic
County Clerk	Brianna L. Lennon	Democratic
Collector	Brian McCollum	Democratic
Commissioner (presiding)	Kip Kendrick	Democratic
Commissioner (district 1)	Justin Aldred	Democratic
Commissioner (district 2)	Janet Thompson	Democratic
Prosecuting Attorney	Roger Johnson	Democratic
Public Administrator	Chimene Schwach	Democratic
Recorder	Bob Nolte	Democratic
Sheriff	Robert Dwayne Carey	Democratic
Treasurer	Jenna Redel	Democratic

=== State ===
==== Gubernatorial ====
Past Gubernatorial Elections Results
Year	Republican	Democratic	Third Parties
2024	46.92% 41,770	50.66% 45,101	2.42% 2,160
2020	44.63% 40,478	52.96% 48,056	2.39% 2,171
2016	41.28% 34,106	54.95% 45,396	3.77% 3,117
2012	37.59% 29,171	58.38% 45,302	4.03% 3,125
2008	42.71% 35,785	55.28% 46,315	2.01% 1,688
2004	47.33% 35,666	51.08% 38,489	1.59% 1,201
2000	43.13% 25,609	52.22% 31,007	4.65% 2,767
1996	30.51% 15,929	65.62% 34,266	3.87% 2,021

==== Missouri House of Representatives ====
Boone County is split between five legislative districts in the Missouri House of Representatives. Three are held by Republicans, with two held by Democrats.

- District 44 — Cheri Toalson Reisch (R-Hallsville). Consists of the communities of Centralia, Hallsville, Sturgeon, and northeastern Columbia.

Missouri House of Representatives — District 44 — Boone County (2020)
Party	Candidate	Votes	%	±%
Republican	Cheri Toalson Reisch	10,470	59.00%	+2.99
Democratic	Jacque Sample	7,276	41.00%	−2.99

Missouri House of Representatives — District 44 — Boone County (2018)
Party	Candidate	Votes	%	±%
Republican	Cheri Toalson Reisch	8,140	56.01%	+0.60
Democratic	Maren Bell Jones	6,392	43.99%	−0.60

- District 45 — David Smith (D-Columbia). Consists of the north-central part of the city of Columbia.

Missouri House of Representatives — District 45 Special Election — Boone County (2021)
Party	Candidate	Votes	%	±%
Democratic	David Tyson Smith	1,801	75.10%	−24.90
Libertarian	Glenn Nielsen	594	24.77%	+24.77
	Write-ins	3	0.13%	

Missouri House of Representatives — District 45 — Boone County (2020)
Party	Candidate	Votes	%	±%
Democratic	Kip Kendrick	11,627	100.00%	±0.00

- District 46 – Martha Stevens (D-Columbia). Consists of the southern part of the city of Columbia.

Missouri House of Representatives — District 46 — Boone County (2020)
Party	Candidate	Votes	%	±%
Democratic	Martha Stevens	16,043	100.00%	+33.47

Missouri House of Representatives — District 46 — Boone County (2018)
Party	Candidate	Votes	%	±%
Democratic	Martha Stevens	11,548	64.91%	+2.26
Republican	Cathy D. Richards	5,954	33.47%	−2.26

- District 47 — Charles Basye (R-Rocheport). Consists of the western part of the city of Columbia and the communities of Harrisburg and Rocheport.

Missouri House of Representatives — District 47 — Boone County (2020)
Party	Candidate	Votes	%	±%
Republican	Charles (Chuck) Basye	8,507	53.50%	+0.12
Democratic	Adrian Plank	7,395	46.50%	−0.12

Missouri House of Representatives — District 47 — Boone County (2018)
Party	Candidate	Votes	%	±%
Republican	Charles (Chuck) Basye	7,197	53.38%	+0.63
Democratic	Adrian Plank	6,286	46.62%	−0.63

- District 50 – Sara Walsh Consists of parts of the city of Columbia and the communities of Ashland, Hartsburg, and McBaine.

Missouri House of Representatives – District 50 – Boone County (2020)
Party	Candidate	Votes	%	±%
Republican	Sara Walsh	11,268	57.63%	+2.93
Democratic	Kari L. Chesney	8,283	42.37%	−2.93

Missouri House of Representatives — District 50 — Boone County (2018)
Party	Candidate	Votes	%	±%
Republican	Sara Walsh	8,506	54.70%	+7.79
Democratic	Michela Skelton	7,044	45.30%	−7.79

==== Missouri Senate ====
All of Boone County is a part of Missouri's 19th District in the Missouri Senate and is currently represented by Caleb Rowden (R-Columbia), who is the Majority Floor Leader. However, Democrats have carried Boone County in recent elections.

Missouri Senate — District 19 — Boone County (2020)
Party	Candidate	Votes	%	±%
Democratic	Judy Baker	45,290	50.66%	±0.00
Republican	Caleb Rowden	44,046	49.27%	−0.07
	Write-ins	63	0.07%	

Missouri Senate — District 19 — Boone County (2016)
Party	Candidate	Votes	%	±%
Democratic	Stephen Webber	40,858	50.66%	+7.14
Republican	Caleb Rowden	39,795	49.34%	−7.14

=== Federal ===
==== Presidential ====
United States presidential election results for Boone County, Missouri
Year	Republican		Democratic		Third party(ies)	
Year	No.	%	No.	%	No.	%
1888	1,512	26.79%	4,068	72.08%	64	1.13%
1892	1,495	25.75%	4,054	69.82%	257	4.43%
1896	1,705	24.99%	5,075	74.39%	42	0.62%
1900	1,672	25.38%	4,793	72.74%	124	1.88%
1904	1,857	29.35%	4,375	69.15%	95	1.50%
1908	2,149	29.63%	5,041	69.49%	64	0.88%
1912	1,350	18.86%	5,027	70.23%	781	10.91%
1916	2,180	27.81%	5,601	71.46%	57	0.73%
1920	4,077	31.63%	8,748	67.87%	65	0.50%
1924	3,547	28.67%	8,657	69.97%	169	1.37%
1928	4,876	36.61%	8,422	63.23%	21	0.16%
1932	3,241	21.64%	11,554	77.13%	184	1.23%
1936	3,624	24.28%	11,241	75.31%	61	0.41%
1940	4,869	29.43%	11,615	70.21%	59	0.36%
1944	4,195	30.12%	9,704	69.67%	30	0.22%
1948	4,289	29.27%	10,200	69.61%	164	1.12%
1952	7,545	42.42%	10,206	57.39%	34	0.19%
1956	8,197	44.07%	10,404	55.93%	0	0.00%
1960	10,453	47.59%	11,514	52.41%	0	0.00%
1964	7,695	34.27%	14,758	65.73%	0	0.00%
1968	11,917	46.36%	11,771	45.80%	2,015	7.84%
1972	17,488	56.13%	13,666	43.87%	0	0.00%
1976	16,373	46.92%	17,674	50.65%	846	2.42%
1980	16,313	42.00%	18,527	47.70%	3,997	10.29%
1984	26,600	57.87%	19,364	42.13%	0	0.00%
1988	22,948	48.35%	24,370	51.35%	140	0.29%
1992	19,405	33.52%	26,176	45.22%	12,309	21.26%
1996	22,047	42.46%	24,984	48.12%	4,889	9.42%
2000	28,426	47.69%	28,811	48.33%	2,372	3.98%
2004	37,801	49.71%	37,643	49.50%	602	0.79%
2008	36,849	43.22%	47,062	55.20%	1,340	1.57%
2012	37,404	47.10%	39,847	50.17%	2,171	2.73%
2016	36,200	43.16%	41,125	49.04%	6,543	7.80%
2020	38,646	42.39%	50,064	54.91%	2,458	2.70%
2024	39,673	44.03%	48,452	53.77%	1,985	2.20%

==== US House of Representatives ====
Northern Boone County is included in Missouri's 4th Congressional District and is currently represented by Mark Alford (R-Lake Winnebago, Missouri) in the U.S. House of Representatives. On October 27, 2021, Alford Sr. announced his candidacy for the United States House of Representatives in Missouri's 4th congressional district as a Republican in the 2022 elections. He won the Republican nomination in the August 2 primary election and won the November 8 general election.

Southern Boone County is included in Missouri's 3rd congressional district and was previously represented by Blaine Luetkemeyer (R-St. Elizabeth, Missouri) in the U.S. House of Representatives. Luetkemeyer has won every election since 2008. On January 4, 2024, he announced he would not run for reelection in 2024.

U.S. House of Representatives — Missouri's 4th Congressional District — Boone County (2020)
Party	Candidate	Votes	%	±%
Democratic	Lindsey Simmons	45,540	51.26%	−2.36
Republican	Vicky Hartzler	40,809	45.93%	+1.78
Libertarian	Steven K. Koonse	2,495	2.81%	+0.57

U.S. House of Representatives — Missouri’s 4th Congressional District — Boone County (2018)
Party	Candidate	Votes	%	±%
Democratic	Renee Hoagenson	39,830	53.62%	+7.64
Republican	Vicky Hartzler	32,797	44.15%	−5.51
Libertarian	Mark Bliss	1,661	2.24%	−2.12

==== US Senate ====
Boone County, along with the rest of the state of Missouri, is represented in the U.S. Senate by Josh Hawley (R-Columbia) and Eric Schmitt (R-Glendale). However, their Democratic opponents carried Boone County in each of their respective most recent elections.

U.S. Senate – Class I – Boone County (2018)
Party	Candidate	Votes	%	±%
Democratic	Claire McCaskill	42,315	56.28%	−3.13
Republican	Josh Hawley	30,710	40.84%	+8.23
Libertarian	Japheth Campbell	924	1.23%	−6.74
Independent	Craig O'Dear	833	1.11%	
Green	Jo Crain	410	0.55%	+0.55

Blunt was elected to a second term in 2016 over then-Missouri Secretary of State Jason Kander.

U.S. Senate — Class III — Boone County (2016)
Party	Candidate	Votes	%	±%
Democratic	Jason Kander	45,100	54.29%	−5.13
Republican	Roy Blunt	34,171	41.13%	+8.52
Libertarian	Jonathan Dine	2,167	2.61%	−5.36
Green	Johnathan McFarland	919	1.11%	+1.11
Constitution	Fred Ryman	695	0.84%	+0.84
Write-In	Write-ins	19	0.02%	

=== Missouri presidential preference primaries ===
==== 2020 ====
The 2020 presidential primaries for both the Democratic and Republican parties were held in Missouri on March 10. On the Democratic side, former Vice President Joe Biden (D-Delaware) both won statewide by a wide margin and carried a majority in Boone County. Biden went on to defeat President Donald Trump in the general election.

Missouri Democratic Presidential Primary – Boone County (2020)
Party	Candidate	Votes	%	±%
Democratic	Joe Biden	15,290	50.49	
Democratic	Bernie Sanders	13,610	44.94	
Democratic	Tulsi Gabbard	290	0.96	
Democratic	Others/Uncommitted	610	2.01	

Incumbent President Donald Trump (R-Florida) faced a primary challenge from former Massachusetts Governor Bill Weld, but won both Boone County and statewide by overwhelming margins.

Missouri Republican Presidential Primary – Boone County (2020)
Party	Candidate	Votes	%	±%
Republican	Donald Trump	7,818	95.54	
Republican	Bill Weld	148	1.81	
Republican	Others/Uncommitted	217	2.65	

==== 2016 ====
The 2016 presidential primaries for both the Republican and Democratic parties were held in Missouri on March 15. Businessman Donald Trump (R-New York) narrowly won the state overall, but Senator Ted Cruz (R-Texas) carried a plurality of the vote in Boone County. Trump went on to win the nomination and the presidency.

Missouri Republican Presidential Primary – Boone County (2016)
Party	Candidate	Votes	%	±%
Republican	Ted Cruz	11,235	43.87	
Republican	Donald Trump	7,913	30.90	
Republican	John Kasich	3,733	14.58	
Republican	Marco Rubio	2,110	8.24	
Republican	Others/Uncommitted	618	2.41	

On the Democratic side, former Secretary of State Hillary Clinton (D-New York) narrowly won statewide, but Senator Bernie Sanders (I-Vermont) won Boone County by a wide margin.

Missouri Democratic Presidential Primary – Boone County (2016)
Party	Candidate	Votes	%	±%
Democratic	Bernie Sanders	15,119	60.63	
Democratic	Hillary Clinton	9,643	38.67	
Democratic	Others/Uncommitted	175	0.70	

==== 2012 ====
The 2012 Missouri Republican Presidential Primary's results were nonbinding on the state's national convention delegates. Voters in Boone County supported former U.S. Senator Rick Santorum (R-Pennsylvania), who finished first in the state at large, but eventually lost the nomination to former Governor Mitt Romney (R-Massachusetts). Delegates to the congressional district and state conventions were chosen at a county caucus, which selected a delegation favoring Congressman Ron Paul (R-Texas). Incumbent President Barack Obama easily won the Missouri Democratic Primary and renomination. He defeated Romney in the general election.

==== 2008 ====
In 2008, the Missouri Republican Presidential Primary was closely contested, with Senator John McCain (R-Arizona) prevailing and eventually winning the nomination. Former Governor Mitt Romney (R-Massachusetts) won a plurality in Boone County.

Missouri Republican Presidential Primary – Boone County (2008)
Party	Candidate	Votes	%	±%
Republican	Mitt Romney	5,688	35.94	
Republican	John McCain	4,948	31.26	
Republican	Mike Huckabee	3,838	24.25	
Republican	Ron Paul	1,047	6.62	
Republican	Others/Uncommitted	306	1.92	

Then-Senator Barack Obama (D-Illinois) received more votes than any candidate from either party in Boone County during the 2008 presidential primary. Despite initial reports that Hillary Clinton (D-New York), also a senator at the time, had won Missouri, Obama narrowly defeated her statewide and later became that year's Democratic nominee, going on to win the presidency.

Missouri Democratic Presidential Primary – Boone County (2008)
Party	Candidate	Votes	%	±%
Democratic	Barack Obama	15,750	60.57	
Democratic	Hillary Clinton	9,601	36.92	
Democratic	Others/Uncommitted	652	2.50	

== Public safety ==
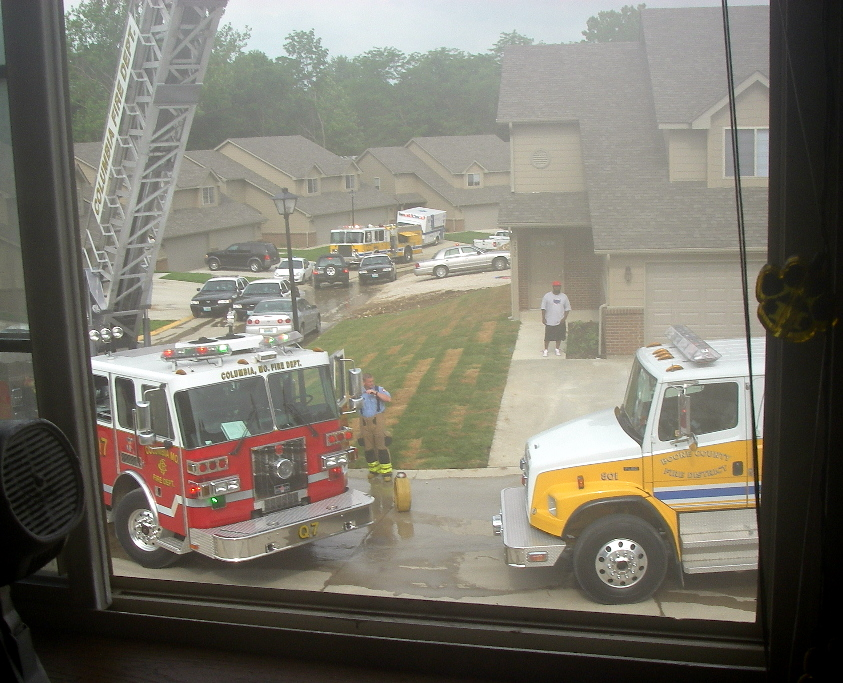
The Boone County Fire Protection District responding to a working structure fire.

The Boone County Sheriff has jurisdiction over the whole county. The Boone County Fire Protection District (BCFPD) provides fire protection and emergency medical services for a large portion of Boone County, Missouri. The BCFPD is the largest volunteer fire department and third largest fire service organization in the state, protecting 492 square miles (1,270 km^{2}) of residential, commercial, industrial and agricultural property and over 50,000 people. The Boone County Fire District maintains 15 fire stations, a training center, and a headquarters facility.

=== History ===
Prior to 1964, there was no organized fire protection in Boone County. This changed after an elderly handicapped woman died in a house fire just west of the city limits of Columbia. A small group of CB radio enthusiasts, known as the Central Missouri Radio Squad, banded together to develop a fire protection system for Boone County.

=== USAR Task Force ===
Boone County Fire is the sponsoring agency of Urban Search and Rescue Missouri Task Force 1 (MO-TF1), which is one of 28 FEMA Urban Search and Rescue Task Forces across the United States. The team is made up of 210 members that are qualified in various aspects of urban search and rescue.

== Notable people ==
- James William Abert – soldier and explorer
- David W. Alexander, 19th century Los Angeles, California politician and sheriff
- Thomas M. Allen – clergyman
- Benjamin Anderson – economist
- Gary Anderson – football player
- Simon Barrett – filmmaker
- Rob Benedict – actor
- Duane Benton – judge
- Rebecca Blank – educator; acting U.S. Secretary of Commerce (2011-2011; 2012–2013)
- Philemon Bliss – U.S. Representative from Ohio (1855–1859), 1st Chief Justice of the Supreme Court of Dakota Territory, and Associate Justice of Missouri Supreme Court (1868–1872)
- John William Boone – musician
- Stratton D. Brooks – college president
- Fleda Brown – poet
- Jessica Capshaw – actress
- Russ Carnahan – U.S. Representative from Missouri (2005–2013)
- Albert Bishop Chance, inventor of the earth anchor, mayor of Centralia, and founder of the A.B. Chance Company
- J'den Cox – wrestler, Olympic medalist
- Kevin Croom – UFC Mixed Martial Artist
- Jack D. Crouch – hotelier
- Derek "Deke" Dickerson – musician
- Carl Edwards – retired NASCAR driver
- Jane Froman – singer; actress
- Nicole Galloway – Missouri State Auditor (2015-2023), Democratic nominee for Governor of Missouri (2020)
- Chuck Graham – politician
- Ken Griffin – organist
- Eugene Jerome Hainer – U.S. Representative from Nebraska (1893–1897)
- William Least Heat-Moon – writer
- Martin Heinrich – U.S. Senator from New Mexico (2013–present), U.S. Representative from New Mexico (2009–2013)
- Peter Hessler – journalist
- Darwin Hindman – mayor of Columbia (1995–2010)
- Brett James – singer
- William Jewell – educator, second mayor of Columbia
- Leon W. Johnson – Air Force General
- Tyler Johnson – baseball pitcher
- Daniel Webster Jones – Mormon pioneer
- John Carleton Jones – president of the University of Missouri
- Lloyd E. Jones – United States Army major general
- Kraig Kann – golf commentator
- Henry Kirklin, horticulturalist, first black instructor at the University of Missouri
- E. Stanley Kroenke – sports mogul
- Sergei Kopeikin – astrophysicist
- Ken Lay – chief executive, Enron
- Grace Lee – radio and television personality
- Guy Sumner Lowman, Jr. – linguist
- Jeff Maggert – professional golfer
- William Rainey Marshall – 5th Governor of Minnesota (1866–1870)
- William L. Nelson – U.S. Representative from Missouri (1861–1865)
- John Neihardt – poet
- Don Nardo – author
- Korla Pandit – musician
- Carlos Pena Jr. – singer
- Michael Porter Jr. – basketball player for Denver Nuggets
- William Rainey Marshall – Minnesota Governor
- James S. Rollins – 19th-century politician
- James S. Rollins (20th-century politician)
- Jesse M. Roper – 19th-century naval officer
- Charles Griffith Ross – press secretary for U.S. President Harry S. Truman
- Felix Sabates – philanthropist
- Max Schwabe – U.S. Representative from Missouri (1943–1949)
- Jon Scott – television journalist
- John F. Shafroth – U.S. Senator from Colorado (1913–1919), Governor of Colorado (1909–1913), U.S. Representative from Colorado (1895–1904)
- Clay Shirky – writer
- Apollo M. O. Smith – aviation executive
- William Smith – actor
- William J. Stone – U.S. Senator from Missouri (1903–1918), Governor of Missouri (1893–1897), U.S. Representative from Missouri (1885–1891)
- Blake Tekotte – baseball player
- Malcolm Thomas – professional basketball player
- Nischelle Turner – television personality
- Zbylut Twardowski – nephrologist
- Charlie Van Dyke – radio personality
- Andrew VanWyngarden – musician
- James "Bud" Walton – co-founder, Wal-Mart
- Sam Walton – co-founder, Wal-Mart
- Edwin Moss Watson – editor; publisher
- Norbert Wiener – mathematician
- Lisa Wilcox – actress
- Roger B. Wilson – 52nd Governor of Missouri (2000–2001)

== See also ==
- List of cemeteries in Boone County, Missouri
- National Register of Historic Places listings in Boone County, Missouri
- Boone County Historical Society
- Boone County Journal — newspaper in Boone County
