= List of people from Columbia, Missouri =

This is a list of the people born in, residents of, or otherwise closely associated with the American city of Columbia, Missouri, and its surrounding metropolitan area.

== Attending college in Columbia ==
Many people have lived in Columbia temporarily, while attending one of the city's institutions of higher education; such people are not included in this list. For lists of people who attended college in Columbia see:

- List of Columbia College alumni
- List of Stephens College alumni
- List of University of Missouri alumni

== A–D ==
- James William Abert – soldier and explorer
- Thomas M. Allen – clergyman
- Benjamin Anderson – economist
- Gary Anderson – football player
- Judy Baker – politician
- Simon Barrett – filmmaker
- Matt Bartle – politician
- Rob Benedict – actor
- Duane Benton – judge
- Rebecca Blank – educator; U.S. secretary of commerce
- Philemon Bliss – judge
- John William Boone – musician
- Stratton D. Brooks – college president
- Fleda Brown – poet
- Jessica Capshaw – actress
- Russ Carnahan – politician
- J'den Cox – Olympic freestyle wrestler
- Kevin Croom – UFC mixed martial artist
- Jack D. Crouch – hotelier
- Derek "Deke" Dickerson – musician

== E–L ==
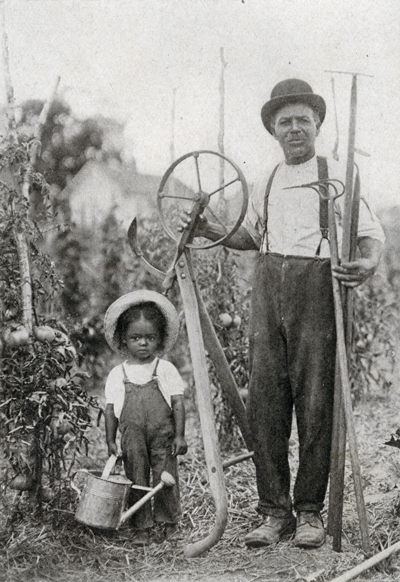
Henry Kirklin with a child in his garden

- Carl Edwards – retired NASCAR driver
- Jane Froman – singer; actress
- Nicole Galloway – politician
- Chuck Graham – politician
- Ken Griffin – organist
- Eugene Jerome Hainer – Nebraska politician
- Jeff Harris – politician
- William Least Heat-Moon – writer
- Martin Heinrich – U.S. senator from New Mexico
- Michelle Hendley – actress and YouTuber
- Peter Hessler – journalist
- Darwin Hindman – mayor of Columbia (1995–2010)
- Brett James – singer
- William Jewell – educator, second mayor of Columbia
- Leon W. Johnson – Air Force general
- Tyler Johnson – baseball pitcher
- Daniel Webster Jones – Mormon pioneer
- John Carleton Jones – president of the University of Missouri
- Lloyd E. Jones – United States Army major general
- Kraig Kann – golf commentator
- Henry Kirklin – horticulturalist, first black instructor at the University of Missouri
- Walt Koken (born 1946) – claw-hammer banjo player, fiddler, and singer
- Sergei Kopeikin – astrophysicist
- E. Stanley Kroenke – sports mogul
- Ken Lay – chief executive, Enron
- Grace Lee – radio and television personality
- Drew Lock – American football quarterback for Seattle Seahawks
- Guy Sumner Lowman, Jr. – linguist

== M–S ==
- Jeff Maggert – golfer
- Howard Wight Marshall – professor, folk historian, fiddler
- William Rainey Marshall – fifth governor of Minnesota
- Don Nardo – author
- John Neihardt – poet
- William L. Nelson – politician
- Korla Pandit – musician
- Carlos Pena Jr. – singer
- Jontay Porter – basketball player
- Michael Porter Jr. – basketball player for Denver Nuggets
- James S. Rollins – 19th-century politician
- Jesse M. Roper – 19th-century naval officer
- Charles Griffith Ross – press secretary for U.S. President Harry S. Truman
- Austin Ruse – political activist, author
- Felix Sabates – philanthropist
- Therese Sander – farmer; politician
- Max Schwabe – politician
- Jon Scott – television journalist
- John F. Shafroth – Colorado politician
- Clay Shirky – writer
- Apollo M. O. Smith – aviation executive
- William Smith – actor
- William J. Stone – 28th governor of Missouri

== T–Z ==
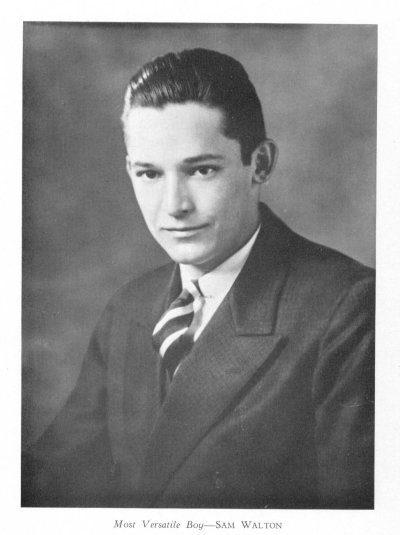
Sam Walton in the David H. Hickman High School yearbook

- Blake Tekotte – baseball player
- Malcolm Thomas – basketball player
- Nischelle Turner – television personality
- Zbylut Twardowski – nephrologist
- Charlie Van Dyke – radio personality
- Andrew VanWyngarden – musician
- James "Bud" Walton – co-founder, Wal-Mart
- Sam Walton – co-founder, Wal-Mart
- Edwin Moss Watson – editor; publisher
- Whitney Wegman-Wood – actress
- Norbert Wiener – mathematician
- Lisa Wilcox – actress
- Roger B. Wilson – 52nd governor of Missouri

== See also ==
- List of people from Missouri
- List of cemeteries in Boone County, Missouri
