= Rock Bridge Township, Boone County, Missouri =

Rock Bridge Township
- Township
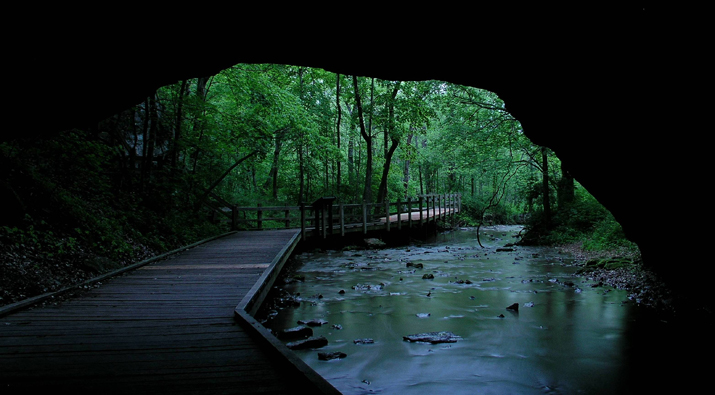
- Interactive map of Rock Bridge Township
- Coordinates: 38°51′50″N 92°23′05″W
- Country: United States
- State: Missouri
- County: Boone
- Area code: 573
- GNIS Feature ID: 2045044

Rock Bridge Township is one of ten townships in Boone County, Missouri, USA. As of the 2012 census, its population was 2,729. The township's major city is the village of McBaine.

== History ==
Settled mainly by settlers from the upland south (Kentucky, Virginia, and Tennessee), the township was named after a natural karst formation located in today's Rock Bridge State Park. This area is rapidly urbanizing as the city of Columbia expands south.

== Geography ==
Rock Bridge Township covers an area between the city of Columbia and the Missouri River. The township contains one incorporated settlement besides Columbia: McBaine. The unincorporated communities of Providence, Easley, and Pierpont are also within the bounds. The Little Boone Femme and Roche Perche Creeks empty into the Missouri River at the southeastern edge of the township. Providence River access, Cooper's Landing, Eagle Bluffs, and Rock Bridge State Park are all within the township. The area contains the most extensive karst features north of the Missouri River.
