= Bourbon Township, Boone County, Missouri =

Unincorporated community in the American state of Missouri

Bourbon Township
- Township
- Interactive map of Bourbon Township
- Coordinates: 39°04′54″N 94°35′49″W
- Country: United States
- State: Missouri
- County: Boone

Area
  - Total: 86.6 sq mi (224 km^{2})
  - Land: 81.3 sq mi (211 km^{2})
  - Water: 0.3 sq mi (0.78 km^{2})

Population (2012)
  - Total: 2,729
  - Density: 33.6/sq mi (13.0/km^{2})
- Area code: 573
- FIPS code: 2901907498
- GNIS feature ID: 766329

Bourbon Township is one of ten townships in Boone County, Missouri, USA. As of the 2012, its population was 2,729. The township's major city is the railroad town of Sturgeon.

== History ==
Bourbon Township was established in 1854. The township took its name from the community of Bourbon.

== Geography ==
Bourbon Township covers an area of 81.3 square miles (211 km^{2}) and is located in the extreme northwest corner of Boone County. The township contains one incorporated settlement: Sturgeon. The unincorporated communities of Riggs and Rucker are also within the bounds. There are at least seven major cemeteries located within its bounds: Robinson, Riggs Union, Sturgeon, Palmer, Far West, Fountain, and Sims (Mt. Carmel). The two largest waterways are the Roche Perche, and Silver Fork Creek. In addition, Kile Creek, Sugar Creek, Little Creek, and the Thompson Branch flow through the area.
