= Kayla Jackson-Williams =

American judge (born 1990/91)

Kayla Jackson-Williams is an American judge in Columbia, Missouri.

Jackson-Williams was born in St Louis. When she was 14 her father passed away, Kayla described her father as her best friend.

She received a Bachelor of Science in justice systems at Truman State University in 2012. She received her Juris Doctor at the University of Missouri in 2016.

She became a judge in January 2023 at age 32, becoming the first black judge in Boone County, Missouri.
