= Centralia Township =

Centralia Township may refer to the following townships in the United States:

- Centralia Township, Marion County, Illinois
- Centralia Township, Boone County, Missouri
