= Governing boards of colleges and universities in the United States =

Form of higher education administration

In the United States, a board often governs institutions of higher education, including private universities, state universities, and community colleges. In each US state, such boards may govern either the state university system, individual colleges and universities, or both. In general, they operate as a board of directors, and they vary by formal name, size, powers, and membership. In some states, members are appointed by the governor.

From a legal standpoint, many higher education institutions are corporations; they have separate legal personhood. The corporation is the legal owner of its endowment and other property. The corporation's name might consist of its governing board members' title (for example, The Trustees of Princeton University is a New Jersey nonprofit corporation). These board members (trustees, regents, etc.) are fiduciaries for the corporation. In some cases, the institution might not have separate legal personhood; the trustees transact in their own name with other parties, such as students, faculty, or donors. However, the trustees often utilize a common, enduring title, which enables the trust to operate continuously even as individual trustees change.

In some private institutions of higher learning, non-governing boards may also be appointed. These boards' members' duties often include, but are not limited to, major gift cultivation and fundraising.

== Membership ==
Governing boards of universities are of varying sizes across the United States. Smaller boards may have about ten members, while larger boards can have over 50 members. In 2016, the average public university board had 12 members, while the average private university board had 29 members.

Some university governing boards are composed entirely of alumni of that university. Other boards contain various elected officials, often the state governor, as ex officio members.

Members of the governing board can be selected in a variety of ways. Members of public university boards are most often selected by the state governor. Four states (Colorado, Michigan, Nebraska, and Nevada) elect members of some university boards by popular vote. Boards of private universities can be selected either by an alumni vote or by the existing members of the board.

== Board names ==
=== Trustees ===
The term "Board of Trustees" is the most commonly used name for governing bodies of universities in the United States.

All schools within the Ohio Higher Education System are governed by individual boards of trustees, including Miami University and Ohio State University. The governing body at Duke University is known as the board of trustees, while each college and the graduate school maintains its own board of visitors. The University of South Carolina Michigan State University, Indiana University, University of Notre Dame, and the University of Connecticut are also governed by boards of trustees.

=== Regents ===
Thirty-nine states have boards of regents to govern their public university systems.

The Regents of the University of California govern the University of California system, with one exception: the original endowment that allowed for the creation of UC's Hastings College of the Law stipulated that it could not be governed by the regents. However, Hastings diplomas are issued on the recommendation of the Hastings faculty in the name of the UC regents and are signed by the UC president.

The Board of Regents of the University of the State of New York oversees all public education, including the State University of New York (SUNY), affiliated community colleges, and the K–12 public school system (run by the New York State Education Department) via the Regents Examinations. High school graduates may receive Regents Scholarships to defray expenses at SUNY universities.

The boards of the University System of Georgia, University of Hawaii, University of Michigan, University of Minnesota, University of Texas, Texas Tech University, University of Wisconsin System, Texas A&M, University System of Maryland, University of Colorado, University of New Mexico, University of Houston System, University of North Texas, St. Olaf College, University of Washington, and Washington State University are known as the board of regents.

=== Governors ===
The governing bodies of the University of North Carolina and the Colorado State University system are known as their "board of governors". Public institutions in Rhode Island are also governed by a board of governors.

There are five public institutions in Missouri that are not part of the UM System, such as the Missouri State University and the University of Central Missouri, that are overseen by boards of governors. The two largest universities in West Virginia (West Virginia University and Marshall University) also maintain boards of governors.

=== Curators ===
A rare term is that of curators, used by the Board of Curators of the University of Missouri and Lincoln University.

=== Overseers ===
The Harvard Board of Overseers (more formally The Honorable and Reverend Board of Overseers) is one of Harvard University's two governing boards, with the other being the President and Fellows of Harvard College (also known as the Harvard Corporation).

=== Fellows ===
The Fellows of the University of Notre Dame are a self-perpetuating body that retains the core powers of the university and selects the members of the other governing board, the board of trustees.

=== Visitors ===
The following institutions have boards known as a "board of visitors". These include the United States Military Academy, United States Air Force Academy, United States Naval Academy, The Citadel, The Military College of SC, and some universities in Virginia such as the University of Virginia, University of Mary Washington, George Mason University, Virginia State University, Virginia Commonwealth University, Longwood University, Washington and Lee University, the College of William and Mary, Old Dominion University, Christopher Newport University, James Madison University, and Virginia Tech.

== By state or territory ==
=== Alabama ===
The Board of Trustees of the University of Alabama governs the three universities that are part of the University of Alabama System. Auburn University is governed by the Auburn University Board of Trustees.

=== Alaska ===
The board of regents has 11 members and governs the institutions in the University of Alaska System.

=== Arizona ===
The Arizona Board of Regents is the governing body of Arizona's three public universities: the University of Arizona, Arizona State University, and Northern Arizona University.

=== Florida ===
The Florida Board of Governors is a 17-member governing board that establishes the regulations for all institutions in the State University System of Florida, which includes all public universities in the state of Florida. Each institution has its own Board of Trustees which "is the public body corporate of the university. It sets policy for the institution and serves as the institution's legal owner and governing board. The Board of Trustees is responsible for high quality education programs within the laws of the State of Florida and Regulations of the Florida Board of Governors. The Board of Trustees holds the institution's resources in trust and is responsible for their efficient and effective use."

=== Georgia ===
The Board of Regents of the University System of Georgia is the oversight authority for twenty-six universities and colleges in the state of Georgia (including the University of Georgia and Georgia Institute of Technology) along with the state archives and the state public library system.

=== Guam ===
The Board of Regents of the University of Guam is the governing board for the institution.

=== Louisiana ===
In the State of Louisiana, the governing board of each of the four public university systems is known as the board of supervisors.

=== Missouri ===
The governing board of the University of Missouri System and each individual campus in that system is known as the Board of Curators. This terminology is also used by another Missouri public institution, Lincoln University.

However, the state's other public institutions use different terms. Five use Board of Governors (as noted above), and four use board of regents. All public community colleges use board of trustees.

=== North Carolina ===
Institutions in North Carolina use several different names for their boards. The University of North Carolina—which includes all 16 four-year public institutions in the state, plus a residential high school—is overseen by a board of governors. Some individual campuses within the system, such as East Carolina University, North Carolina State University, and the University of North Carolina at Chapel Hill, have boards of visitors.

=== Oregon ===
Oregon's public universities—the University of Oregon, Oregon State University, Portland State University, the Oregon Institute of Technology, Western Oregon University, Eastern Oregon University, and Southern Oregon University—are all governed by boards of trustees. The governing power of Oregon Health & Science University is vested in a board of directors.

=== South Dakota ===
Governance of the six public institutions of higher education in the state of South Dakota is constitutionally granted to the South Dakota Board of Regents. The board of regents also governs the South Dakota School for the Deaf and the South Dakota School for the Blind and Visually Impaired. The three tribal colleges, Oglala Lakota College, Sinte Gleska University, and Sisseton Wahpeton College are each governed independently by boards. All public technical colleges are governed by the South Dakota Board of Technical Education under the South Dakota Department of Education.

=== Virginia ===
Boards governing public institutions of higher education in the state of Virginia are known as the board of visitors. This includes the College of William & Mary, University of Virginia, Virginia Tech, James Madison University, Radford University, University of Mary Washington, Longwood University, Virginia Military Institute, Virginia Commonwealth University, and George Mason University. Terminology for private institutions can vary. Regent University once used "board of visitors", but now uses "board of trustees".

=== Virgin Islands ===
The University of the Virgin Islands is governed by a Board of Trustees.
