= Sturgeon High School =

Location
- Ashland, Missouri; United States; 39°14′38.83″N 92°17′3.11″W

Information
- Type: Public Secondary/High school
- School district: Sturgeon R-V School District
- Director: Jennifer Campbell
- Staff: 12.81 (FTE)
- Grades: 9-12
- Enrollment: 138 (2023–2024)
- Student to teacher ratio: 10.77
- Colors: Royal blue and white
- Team name: Bulldogs
- Website: www.sturgeon.k12.mo.us/o/sturgeon-r-v

Sturgeon High School is a public secondary school in Sturgeon, Missouri. It is operated by the Sturgeon R-V School District and serves a small part of north central Boone County, Missouri. It borders the Centralia and Harrisburg Public School Districts.
