= Bradley Steffens =

American writer (born 1955)

Bradley Steffens (born February 10, 1955) is an American poet, playwright, novelist, and author of more than seventy nonfiction books for children and young adults.

== Early professional work ==
In the mid-1970s Steffens self-published two chapbooks of his poetry, which he sold on the streets of Southern California. In 1976, the City of Laguna Beach, California, denied Steffens a permit to sell his works within the city limits. Steffens went to court, seeking relief under the First Amendment, but the court ruled in favor of the city. Steffens turned to writing a series of one-act plays-in-verse, which were professionally produced as "Herod the Great: A Sequence of Pageants" by the Olympia Arts Ensemble in Minneapolis in 1981 with Michael Yonkers in the title role. Noel BreDahl of the St. Paul Dispatch described the play as "an awesome creation on the part of the playwright." David Hawley, also of the St. Paul Dispatch, wrote, "Steffens is a powerful, talented artist."

== Writing career ==
Steffens has published more than fifty poems over the last forty years. His poems have appeared widely in literary journals, including Crosscurrents, Loonfeather, Stone Country, Sidewalks, The Berlin Review, The Bellingham Review, River Bottom, The Worcester Review, The Birmingham Review, Black Buzzard Review, The Lake Street Review, Plains Poetry Journal, The White Rock Review, The Ball State University Forum, San Diego Writers' Monthly, Encore, and Farmer's Market. He has received awards for his poetry, including the Emerging Voices Award presented by The Loft Literary Center in Minneapolis and the Lake Superior Writing Competition Award sponsored by the Duluth Public Library. While working as a freelance proofreader for Lucent Books in 1989, Steffens wrote his first nonfiction book for children, Animal Rights. Over the next thirty-four years, he wrote sixty-three more books for children and young adults, coauthored seven, and edited the 2004 anthology The Free Speech Movement. His works have been reviewed by Booklist, School Library Journal, Kirkus Reviews, and Children's Literature. The Fountain called his Ibn al-Haytham: First Scientist a "beautiful work about Ibn al-Haytham and his advancement of experimental science." In December 2021, Kirkus Reviews named his book The Dark Side of Social Media one of the Best YA Nonfiction Books of 2021.

Steffens is a two-time recipient of the San Diego Book Award for Best Young Adult & Children's Nonfiction. His Giants won the 2005 award and his J.K. Rowling received the 2007 prize. J.K. Rowling also earned Steffens the Theodor S. Geisel Award for the best published book by a San Diego County author in 2007. His Ibn al-Haytham: First Scientist was excerpted in Discovery Channel Magazine in March 2010. He was the keynote speaker at the Southeast Regional Conference of The Islamic Medical Association of North America, the Sixth Annual Meeting of the Muslim Public Affairs Council of Western New York, the Pacifica Institute, and Women in Dialogue.

== Selected works ==
Steffens is best known for his 2017 historical novel The Prisoner of Al Hakim, which tells the story of the eleventh-century Islamic mathematician Alhasan Ibn al-Haytham. The Fountain commented, "From the very first page Steffens brilliantly brings Alhasan's internal character to life on the page, sketching a conflicted, fascinating portrait of a reluctant hero. It's not easy to dramatize the acts of thinking and creating—and harder still to do so in a subtle, elegant style—yet Steffens manages the trick." Blue Minaret praised the book, stating: "The story of Ibn al-Haytham has now been fictionalized masterfully by Bradley Steffens. Each character is well-crafted and in-depth. Each chapter is action-packed. Fans of history will appreciate the descriptions of Cairo and Basra, the esteemed House of Wisdom, even the deserts forming the backdrop of the book. There are plenty of women with strong, independent spirits, and many men in whose hearts burns the love of both God and science." Wardah Books observed: "This period novel dating back to the Abbasid and Fatimid Caliphate brings to the fore an oft-forgotten side of polymaths such as Alhasan Ibn al-Haytham, as a person who, like all of us, experiences doubt, fear and love."

== Author ==
- The Empty Quarter. Clifton, NJ: Blue Dome Press, 2026. ISBN 9781682060469
- Understanding Anxiety and Panic Attacks. San Diego: ReferencePoint Press, 2026. ISBN 9781678213763
- Leo XIV: The First American Pope. San Diego: ReferencePoint Press, 2026. ISBN 9781678212582
- Donald Trump: Controversial 47th President. San Diego: ReferencePoint Press, 2025. ISBN 9781678212124
- Anime and Manga Fan Culture. San Diego: ReferencePoint Press, 2025. ISBN 9781678210687
- Quick Guide to Evaluating Information Online. San Diego: ReferencePoint Press, 2024. ISBN 9781678208141
- Hi-Tech Jobs in Social Media (Exploring Hi-Tech Jobs). San Diego: ReferencePoint Press, 2024. ISBN 9781678207106
- Freedom of Speech: Should There Be Limits? San Diego: ReferencePoint Press, 2023. ISBN 9781678205768
- The Rise of Anime and Manga: From Japanese Art Form to Global Phenomenon. San Diego: ReferencePoint Press, 2023. ISBN 9781678205867
- Social Media (Thinking Critically). San Diego: ReferencePoint Press, 2022. ISBN 9781678204648
- Screen Addiction: A Teen Epidemic. San Diego: ReferencePoint Press, 2022. ISBN 9781678203528
- Teen Suicide on the Rise (Mental Health Crisis). San Diego: ReferencePoint Press, 2022. ISBN 9781678202804
- The Art and Artists of Anime (All About Anime and Manga). San Diego: ReferencePoint Press, 2022. ISBN 9781678202187
- The Science of Infectious Diseases. San Diego: ReferencePoint Press, 2022. ISBN 9781678201609
- The Dark Side of Social Media. San Diego: ReferencePoint Press, 2022. ISBN 9781678200787
- First Scientist: Ibn Al-Haytham. Clifton, NJ: Blue Dome Press, 2021. ISBN 9781682060292
- Health, Illness, and Death in the Time of COVID-19 (Understanding the COVID-19 Pandemic). San Diego: ReferencePoint Press, 2021. ISBN 9781678200343
- Esports and the New Gaming Culture. San Diego: ReferencePoint Press, 2020. ISBN 9781682829257
- Medical Drones (World of Drones). San Diego: ReferencePoint Press, 2020. ISBN 9781682828311
- Social Media Deception (Risks of Social Media). San Diego: ReferencePoint Press, 2020. ISBN 9781682828533
- Social Media Addiction (Risks of Social Media). San Diego: ReferencePoint Press, 2020. ISBN 9781682828519
- Marijuana Risks (Drug Risks). San Diego: ReferencePoint Press, 2020. ISBN 9781682829073
- J. Cole (Giants of Rap and Hip-Hop). San Diego: ReferencePoint Press, 2020. ISBN 9781682827772*J. Cole (Giants of Rap and Hip-Hop). San Diego: ReferencePoint Press, 2020. ISBN 9781682827772
- Drake (Giants of Rap and Hip-Hop). San Diego: ReferencePoint Press, 2020. ISBN 9781682827710
- Addicted to Video Games (Addicted). San Diego: ReferencePoint Press, 2020. ISBN 9781682825754
- The Suicide Epidemic. San Diego: ReferencePoint Press, 2020. ISBN 9781682827413
- The Science and Technology of Basketball (The Science and Technology of Sports). San Diego: ReferencePoint Press, 2020. ISBN 9781682826492
- Gun Violence (Emerging Issues in Public Health). San Diego: ReferencePoint Press, 2020. ISBN 9781682826690
- Cell Phone Addiction (Emerging Issues in Public Health). San Diego: ReferencePoint Press, 2020. ISBN 9781682826652
- Fossil Fuels (Thinking Critically). San Diego: ReferencePoint Press, 2019. ISBN 9781682825334
- Genetic Testing and Research (Thinking Critically). San Diego: ReferencePoint Press, 2019. ISBN 9781682825358
- Gun Violence and Mass Shootings. San Diego: ReferencePoint Press, 2019. ISBN 9781682825150
- Policing (Threats to Civil Liberties). San Diego: ReferencePoint Press, 2019. ISBN 9781682824498
- Privacy (Threats to Civil Liberties). San Diego: ReferencePoint Press, 2019. ISBN 9781682824511
- How the Internet Is Changing the World. San Diego: ReferencePoint Press, 2019. ISBN 9781682824153
- Teen Suicide (Thinking Critically). San Diego: ReferencePoint Press, 2019. ISBN 9781682824474
- Cell Phones (Thinking Critically). San Diego: ReferencePoint Press, 2018. ISBN 9781682823354
- Genocide (Human Rights in Focus). San Diego: ReferencePoint Press, 2017. ISBN 9781682822258
- Torture (Human Rights in Focus). San Diego: ReferencePoint Press, 2017. ISBN 9781682822357
- The Prisoner of Al-Hakim. Clifton, NJ: Blue Dome Press, 2017. ISBN 9781682060162
- Securing Cyberspace (Real-World STEM). San Diego: ReferencePoint Press, 2017. ISBN 9781682822494
- Eliminate the Threat of Nuclear Terror (Real-World STEM). San Diego: ReferencePoint Press, 2017. ISBN 9781682822418
- Big Data Analyst (Cutting Edge Careers). San Diego: ReferencePoint Press, 2017. ISBN 9781682821763
- Biomedical Engineer (Cutting Edge Careers). San Diego: ReferencePoint Press, 2017. ISBN 9781682821787
- Careers in Medical Technology (High-Tech Careers). San Diego: ReferencePoint Press, 2017. ISBN 9781682821169
- Careers in Internet Technology (High-Tech Careers). San Diego: ReferencePoint Press, 2017. ISBN 9781682821145
- Is Marijuana Harmful? (Issues in Society). San Diego: ReferencePoint Press, 2016. ISBN 9781682820971
- Cutting Edge Internet Technology (Cutting Edge Technology). San Diego: ReferencePoint Press, 2016. ISBN 9781682820902
- Free Speech (Ripped from the Headlines). Yankton, SD: Erickson Press, 2007. ISBN 9781602170155
- Ibn al-Haytham: First Scientist (Profiles in Science). Greensboro, NC: Morgan Reynolds Publishing, 2007. ISBN 9781599350240
- J.K. Rowling (People in the News). San Diego: Lucent Books, 2007. ISBN 9781590189634
- Giants (Monsters). San Diego: Kidhaven Press, 2006. ISBN 0737731656
- Censorship (Overview Series). San Diego: Lucent Books, 2004. ISBN 1590181875
- J.K. Rowling (People in the News). San Diego: Lucent Books, 2002. ISBN 1560067764
- Understanding Of Mice and Men (Understanding Great Literature). San Diego: Lucent Books, 2002. ISBN 156006644X
- Furman v. Georgia (Famous Trials). San Diego: Lucent Books, 2001. ISBN 1560064706
- Censorship (Opposing Viewpoints Digests). San Diego: Greenhaven Press, 2001. ISBN 1565103904
- Emily Dickinson (The Importance Of). San Diego: Lucent Books, 1998. ISBN 1560060891
- Censorship (Overview Series). San Diego: Lucent Books, 1995. ISBN 1560061669
- Loch Ness Monster (Exploring the Unknown). San Diego: Greenhaven Press, 1995. ISBN 1560061596
- Addiction (Opposing Viewpoints Juniors). San Diego: Greenhaven Press, 1994. ISBN 1565100948
- The Fall of the Roman Empire (Great Mysteries). San Diego: Greenhaven Press, 1994. ISBN 1565100980
- Free Speech (Opposing Viewpoints Juniors). San Diego: Greenhaven Press, 1992. ISBN 0899080987
- Phonograph (Encyclopedia of Discovery and Invention). San Diego: Lucent Books, 1992. ISBN 1560062223
- Photography (Encyclopedia of Discovery and Invention). San Diego: Lucent Books, 1991. ISBN 1560062126
- The Children's Crusade (World Disasters). San Diego: Lucent Books, 1991. ISBN 1560060190
- Printing Press (Encyclopedia of Discovery and Invention). San Diego: Lucent Books, 1990. ISBN 1560062053
- Working Mothers (Opposing Viewpoints Juniors). San Diego: Greenhaven Press, 1989. ISBN 0899084974
- Animal Rights (Opposing Viewpoints Juniors). San Diego: Greenhaven Press, 1989. ISBN 0899084710
- From the Laguna Beach Pageant of the Masters: An Anonymous Romance of Theatric Space... and Six Anonymous Songs. San Rafael: Sack Back Publications, 1976.
- From an Eighteenth Century Painted Tile and Other Poems. San Francisco: Sack Back Publications, 1975.

== Coauthor ==
- With Don Nardo, Cyclops (Monsters). San Diego: Kidhaven Press, 2005. ISBN 0737726156
- With Don Nardo, Medusa (Monsters). San Diego: Kidhaven Press, 2005. ISBN 0737726172
- With Craig Staples, The Trial of Charles Manson (Famous Trials). San Diego: Lucent Books, 2002. ISBN 1560067330
- With Diana Saenger, Life as a Vietnam POW (American War Library). San Diego: Lucent Books, 2001. ISBN 1560067160
- With Robyn M. Weaver, Cartoonists (History Makers). San Diego: Lucent Books, 2000. ISBN 1560066687
- With Dan Woog, Jesse Jackson (People in the News). San Diego: Lucent Books, 2000. ISBN 1560066318
- With James House, The San Francisco Earthquake (World Disasters). San Diego: Lucent Books, 1989. ISBN 1560060034

== Editor ==
Free Speech Movement (American Social Movements). San Diego: Greenhaven Press, 2004. ISBN 0737711566
