= Bourbon, Boone County, Missouri =

Unincorporated community in Missouri, U.S.

Coordinates: 39°14′20″N 92°18′53″W

Bourbon is an unincorporated community in northern Boone County, in the U.S. state of Missouri. The community was located on Benson Road just east of U.S. Route 63 and about one mile west of Sturgeon.

== History ==
Bourbon was laid out in 1849, and named after Bourbon County, Kentucky, the native home of a share of the first settlers. A variant name was Bourbonton. A post office called Bourbonton was established in 1849, and remained in operation until 1857.
