= Prathersville, Boone County, Missouri =

Unincorporated community in Missouri, U.S.

Coordinates: 39°01′05″N 92°19′19″W

Prathersville is an unincorporated community in Boone County, in the U.S. state of Missouri. Prathersville was named after William Prather, a local merchant. It is located just north of Columbia.
