= Rocky Fork Township, Boone County, Missouri =

Rocky Fork Township
- Township
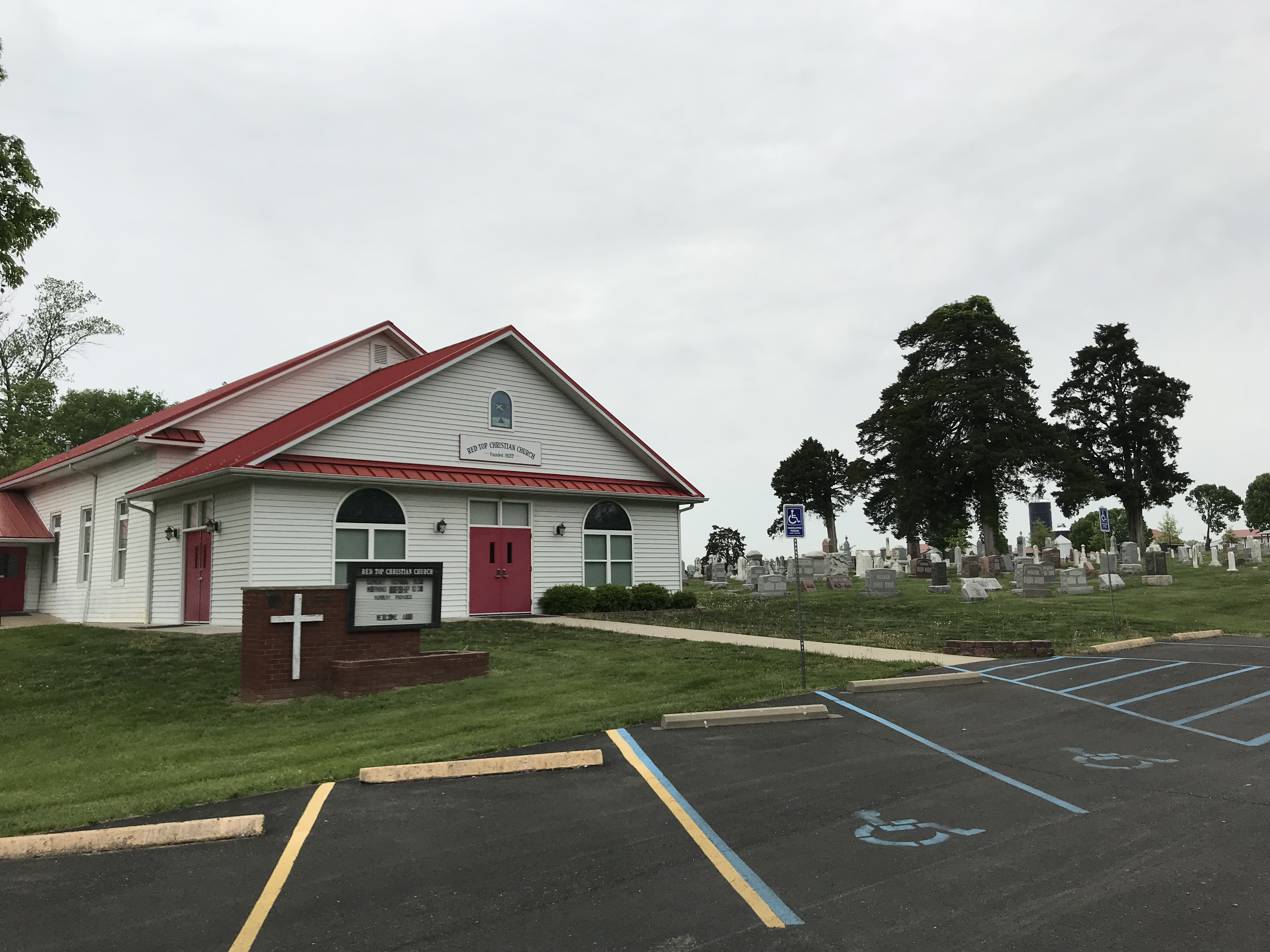
- Interactive map of Rocky Fork Township
- Coordinates: 39°05′25″N 92°13′42″W
- Country: United States
- State: Missouri
- County: Boone
- Area code: 573
- GNIS Feature ID: 766335

Rocky Fork Township is one of ten townships in Boone County, Missouri, USA. The city of Hallsville is the largest settlement in the township.

== History ==
Rocky Fork Township was established in 1821. Settled mainly by settlers from the upland south (Kentucky, Virginia, and Tennessee), the township was named after the Rocky Fork branch of the Roche Perche Creek, which was in turn named after a large rock shelf at the confluence of the two streams. The original route of the Boone's Lick Road entered Boone County from the east here. The Battle of Mount Zion Church occurred in this township during the American Civil War.

== Geography ==
Bourbon Township covers an area on the northeast side of Boone County. The township contains one incorporated settlement: Hallsville. The unincorporated communities of Mt. Zion and Middleton are also within the bounds. There are at least seven major cemeteries located within its area including: Red Top, Hicks, Kincaid, and Palmer. The main waterway is the Rocky Fork Creek, after which the township is named. In the far east is the Little Cedar Creek. In some areas the land was extensively mined for coal, first using shafts and later strip mining.

Finger Lakes State Park, Rocky Fork Conservation Area, and The Pinnacles Youth Park are located here.

This natural area is within Pinnacles Park. From the intersection of Interstate 70 and Highway 63 in Columbia, travel north on Highway 63 for 12 miles and turn right (east) onto Pinnacles Road. Follow the road about a half mile east to the park entrance.
