= Perche Township, Boone County, Missouri =

Perche Township
- Township
- Interactive map of Perche Township
- Coordinates: 39°05′30″N 92°25′28″W
- Country: United States
- State: Missouri
- County: Boone

Area
  - Total: 83.2 sq mi (215 km^{2})
  - Land: 83.0 sq mi (215 km^{2})
  - Water: 0.2 sq mi (0.52 km^{2})

Population (2012)
  - Total: 4,037
  - Density: 48.6/sq mi (18.8/km^{2})
- Area code: 573
- GNIS Feature ID: 766334

Perche Township is one of ten townships in Boone County, Missouri, USA. As of the 2012, its population was 4,037. The village of Harrisburg is the only incorporated settlement inside the township.

== History ==
Perche Township was established in 1821.

Settled mainly by settlers from the upland south (Kentucky, Virginia, and Tennessee), the township was named after the Roche Perche Creek, the largest stream in Boone County (save the Missouri) and flows from North to South through the middle of the township. The town of Perche, Missouri was located where the original path of the Boone's Lick Road crossed Roche Perche Creek. The town site has long been obliterated. The Church and Cemetery of Red Rock are located near here.

== Historical locations ==
The Geographic Names Information System (GNIS) has the following entries associated with the town of Perche:

- Perche (historical) 39°07′30″N 92°24′21″W
- Perche Church 39°11′58″N 92°25′23″W
- Perche Post Office (historical) 39°07′30″N 92°24′21″W

== Geography ==
Perche Township covers an area of 83.2 square miles (215 km^{2}) and is located in the northwest of Boone County. The township contains one incorporated settlement: Harrisburg. The unincorporated settlement of Dripping Springs is also located here. At least two major cemeteries are located within the township: Dripping Springs and Botner. The Roche Perche is the main stream along with the Silver Fork and Lick Fork. Lick Creek Conservation Area is located near the center of the township.
