= Hallsville High School (Missouri) =

Location
- 421 Highway 124 East; Hallsville, Missouri; United States; 39°7′6.93″N 92°13′37.68″W

Information
- Type: Public Secondary/High school
- School district: Hallsville R-IV School District
- Director: Hallsville School District Superintendent of Schools: Tyler Walker Hallsville High School Principal: Matthew Cooley
- Staff: 28.05 (FTE)
- Grades: 9-12
- Enrollment: 447 (2023–2024)
- Student to teacher ratio: 15.94
- Colors: Purple and gold
- Athletics conference: Tri-County Conference (Central Missouri)
- Nickname: Indians and Lady Indians
- Yearbook: Hallsville High School Yearbook*
- Website: www.hallsville.org
- Some yearbooks use the term "Hallsville High School Tomahawk (year)."

Hallsville High School is a public secondary school in Hallsville, Missouri. It is operated by the Hallsville R-IV School District and serves a small part of northeast Boone County, Missouri. It borders the Centralia, Sturgeon and Columbia Public School Districts.

In addition to Hallsville, the district (of which this is the sole comprehensive high school) includes a very small section of the city of Columbia.

== History ==
Hallsville High School was established in 1920 when the first building was erected on the land donated by Wesley and Bertie Wright and David B. Carpenter. After the building was occupied in 1920, they expanded to four years of credit were required to graduate. The first graduating class of Hallsville High School was in 1921.

== Athletics ==
The following sports are offered to students at Hallsville High School:

- Baseball
- Basketball
- Cross Country
- Football - 11 Man
- Golf
- Softball
- Track and Field
- Volleyball - Girls
- Wrestling

== Activities ==
The following MSHSAA activities are offered to students at Hallsville High School:

- Cheerleading
- Choir
- Concert and Marching Band
- Scholar Bowl
- Speech and Debate
