= Missouri Township, Boone County, Missouri =

Missouri Township
- Township
- Interactive map of Missouri Township
- Coordinates: 38°57′24″N 92°22′13″W
- Country: United States
- State: Missouri
- County: Boone

Area
  - Total: 108.5 sq mi (281 km^{2})
  - Land: 107.6 sq mi (279 km^{2})
  - Water: 0.9 sq mi (2.3 km^{2})

Population (2012)
  - Total: 63,334
  - Density: 588.6/sq mi (227.3/km^{2})
- Area code: 573
- GNIS Feature ID: 766333

Missouri Township is one of ten townships in Boone County, Missouri, USA. As of the 2012, its population was 63,334. The township is western half of the City of Columbia making it the most populous township in Boone County.

== History ==
Missouri Township was established in 1822. Settled mainly by settlers from the upland south (Kentucky, Virginia, and Tennessee), the township was named after the Missouri River, to which the township originally extended. The Columbia Cemetery and a small part of the original town plat lie in Missouri township.

== Geography ==
Missouri Township covers an area of 108.5 square miles (281 km^{2}) and is located in the middle of Boone County between the Flat Branch and Roche Perche Creeks. The township contains only one incorporated settlement: Columbia. Hinkson Creek, the Flat Branch and County House Branch flow through the township eventually feeding into the Roche Perche which forms the western border. The township is the most populous and urbanized in Boone County.
