= Katy Township, Boone County, Missouri =

Katy Township
- Township
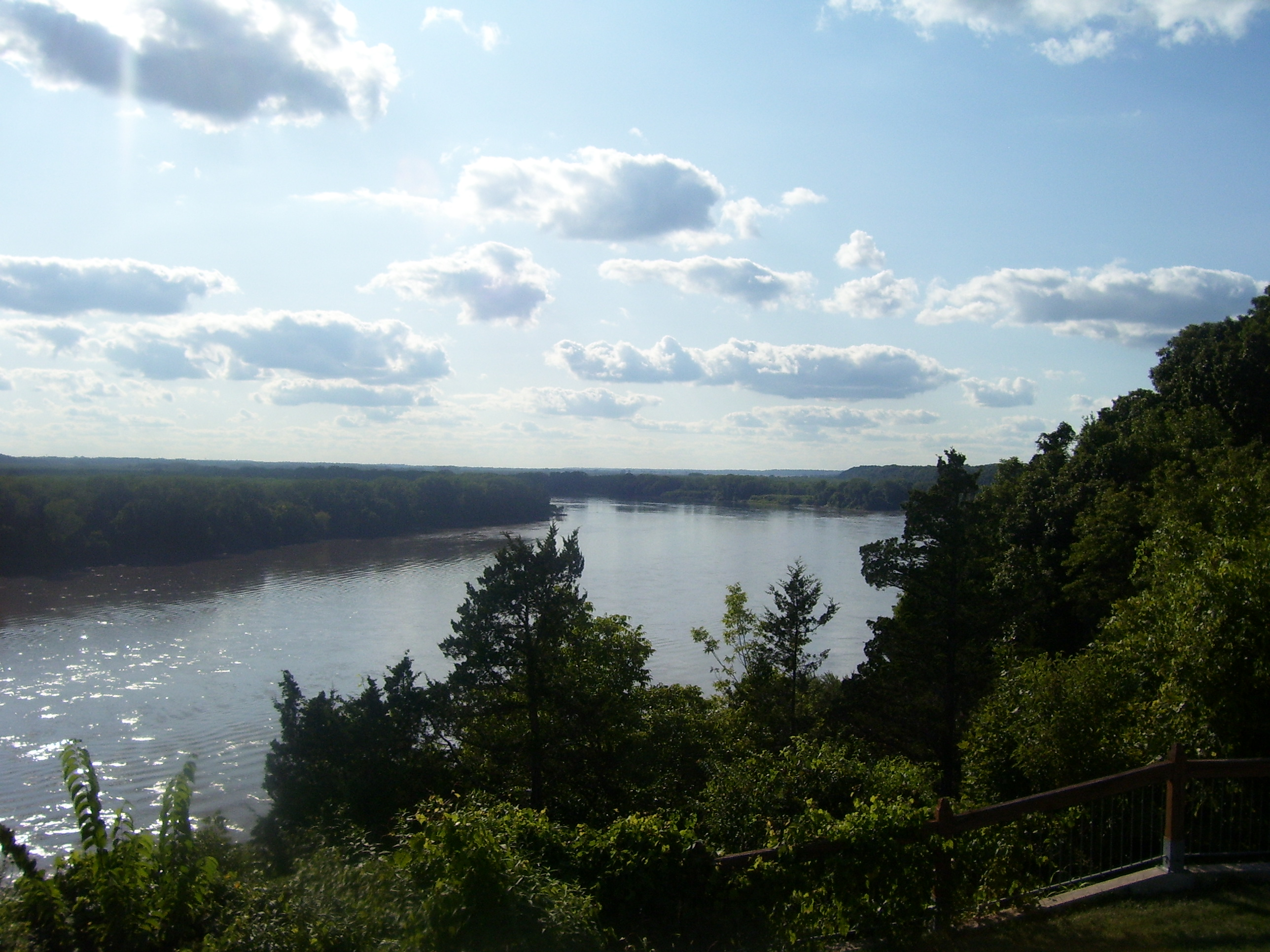
- Interactive map of Katy Township
- Coordinates: 38°58′42″N 92°28′31″W
- Country: United States
- State: Missouri
- County: Boone
- Area code: 573
- GNIS Feature ID: 2045043

Katy Township is one of ten townships in Boone County, Missouri, USA. It is the newest township formed in Boone County and its major city is the river town of Rocheport.

== History ==
Settled mainly by settlers from the upland south (Kentucky, Virginia, and Tennessee), Katy Township was named after the Missouri-Kansas-Texas-Railway (MKT or Katy for short) which runs along the Missouri River on the township's western boundary.

== Geography ==
Katy Township covers an area in western Boone County and is located between the Missouri River and Roche Perche Creek. The township contains two incorporated settlements: Huntsdale, and Rocheport. The unincorporated community of Midway is along Interstate 70. The Katy Trail State Park travels under the Manitou Bluffs as it passes through the township. The Rocheport Cave Conservation Area and the associated karst features, including the largest sinkhole in Missouri are located atop these bluffs.
