= Boone County Journal =

Newspaper in Missouri, U.S.

- Type: Weekly newspaper
- Owner(s): Will and Tara Blue
- Publisher: Tara Blue
- Political alignment: Center
- Headquarters: 201 South Henry Clay P.O. Box 197 Ashland, Missouri 65010
- Circulation: 2167
- Website: http://www.bocojo.com

The Boone County Journal is a small community newspaper that serves Boone County and is headquartered in the city of Ashland, Missouri. Ashland is a small town in Boone County which exists in central Missouri. Boone County is home to Columbia, Missouri which houses the University of Missouri and has a population of about 178, 271 people. The newspaper is released weekly. Advertised as Southern Boone County's primary news source, this newspaper is released each Wednesday to an audience of 2,560 readers.

== Ownership and history ==
The Boone County Journal was founded by Dan Fichel in 1969. There were four ownership changes before the current owners, Will and Tara Blue, bought the newspaper in 2023. Ernie Wren is the lead reporter and managing editor.

== Coverage ==
Abigail Perano with the Missourian wrote a story about the Boone County Journal's owner, Bruce Wallace in November 2017. The story featured Bruce Wallace and his involvement with the Boone County Journal.

== Paper sections ==
The paper consists of six sections: news, sports, opinion, obituaries, classifieds. A major point in the sports section of the newspaper is called “Eagles Football” and contains updates and stories about the Southern Boone high school football team, as well as other school sports.
