= Oldham, Missouri =

Unincorporated community in Missouri, U.S.

Coordinates: 38°43′51″N 92°15′47″W

Oldham is an unincorporated community in southeast Boone County, in the U.S. state of Missouri. The community is on Old Highway 63 approximately three miles south of Ashland.

Folk etymology states the community was named after Asa Old, a local merchant who sold old hams.
