= Heritage Academy (Columbia, Missouri) =

Location
- 2900 Barberry Avenue; Columbia, Missouri; United States; 38.9603°N 92.3476°W

Information
- Type: Private
- Established: 2002
- Head of school: Preston Jones
- Faculty: 26
- Grades: K to 12
- Enrollment: 117 (2022)
- Colors: Navy blue and maroon
- Mascot: Cornelius the Warrior
- Website: www.heritageacademyofcolumbia.com

Heritage Academy is a private, co-educational Christian school in Columbia, Missouri, USA, which employs the University-Model approach to education and is certified by the National Association of University-Model Schools (NAUMS). This approach seeks to combine the strengths of the home with professional instruction. It also provides a larger community for homeschooled students that would be unavailable to them a purely homeschooling environment. Students at Heritage Academy attend classes on campus from one to three days each week. On the other days, they complete assignments under the supervision of a parent or parents.

== History ==
In 1999, members of a home-schooling co-operative called Grace Cottage gathered to discuss the need for a Christian school focused on "parent based education". Heritage Academy was soon formed to fulfill this need and, in fall 2002, the school began serving twelve families and 22 students. The name of the school was chosen by the founding families "to express the desire of parents to pass down a godly heritage to their children". Heritage received certification from NAUMS in 2005 and accreditation status with COGNIA in June 2021. The school was housed in Calvary Baptist Church on Ridgeway Avenue in Columbia until it moved to its current location in 2019.

== Organization ==
Heritage Academy is a K–12 school with a fall 2010 enrollment of 115. Students are grouped into three levels: primary (K–2), elementary (3–6) and secondary (7–12).

=== Administration ===
The current head of school is Preston Jones.

=== Faculty ===
During the 2021–2022 school year, Heritage Academy employed 26 faculty members, of whom 38% held advanced degrees.

== Academics ==
=== Student body ===
Heritage Academy had a 2021-2022 enrollment of 117. This consisted of 29 athlete-only students, four enrichment-only students, 44 secondary students, 17 elementary students and 23 primary students. The total student population in 2021-2022 was up from 108 in 2020-2021 and 92 in 2019–2020.

=== Curriculum ===
The primary and elementary curricula are a mixture of Bob Jones University, A Becka and unique contributions from the teacher. Secondary teachers have greater freedom to design a syllabus as they prefer, though Heritage does abide by NAUMS standards.

== Athletics ==
=== Offerings ===
Athletic opportunities are provided for both boys and girls. Typically, fall sports consist of boys' soccer and girls' volleyball. Boys' basketball is offered in the winter and girls' soccer in the spring.

In the past, Heritage has sponsored boys' baseball and girls' basketball, but these are no longer offered.

=== Eligibility ===
Participation on a Heritage team is generally open to any 7th-12th grader at Heritage and homeschooled students who meet the eligibility requirements. To remain in good standing with an athletic team, participants must maintain a minimum of 70% in each class in which they are currently enrolled at Heritage, home or any other institution.

=== Structure ===
Though the competition levels of teams offered vary by year, Heritage has sponsored varsity, junior varsity and junior high teams in the past. While the varsity teams have a competitive focus, the lower teams "focus more on skill and team development".

The school's mascot is the Warrior and its colors are navy blue and maroon. The school's athletic director since January 2020 is Ricky Nix. The teams mainly compete against local private schools which are comparable in size and religious affiliation, including Christian Fellowship School in Columbia, Lighthouse Preparatory Academy in Jefferson City and North County Christian School in Florissant.

Home soccer games are generally held at Cosmo Park in Columbia.

== Location ==
Heritage Academy is co-located with Higher Ground Church at 2900 Barberry Avenue, Columbia, MO 65202, although the school itself has no denominational affiliation.
