= Centralia Township, Boone County, Missouri =

Centralia Township
- Township
- Interactive map of Centralia Township
- Coordinates: 39°11′50″N 92°09′11″W
- Country: United States
- State: Missouri
- County: Boone

Area
  - Total: 30.6 sq mi (79 km^{2})
  - Land: 30.5 sq mi (79 km^{2})
  - Water: 0.1 sq mi (0.26 km^{2})

Population (2012)
  - Total: 4,674
  - Density: 153/sq mi (59.2/km^{2})
- Area code: 573
- GNIS Feature ID: 766331

Centralia Township is one of ten townships in Boone County, Missouri, USA. As of the 2012, its population was 4,674. The township is dominated by the railroad city of Centralia for which it is named.

== History ==
Centralia Township was established in 1874.

== Geography ==
Centralia Township covers an area of 30.6 square miles (79 km^{2}) and is located in the extreme northeast corner of Boone County. The township contains one incorporated settlement: Centralia. Though the township primarily drains into the Missouri River the extreme northern part drains into the Mississippi River via the Salt River.
