= Easley, Missouri =

Unincorporated community in Missouri, U.S.

Coordinates: 38°48′06″N 92°22′34″W

Easley is an unincorporated community in Boone County, in the U.S. state of Missouri. The last building remaining in Easley, a general store, was moved to the Boone County Historical Society and reconstructed. Easley is on both the Missouri River and Katy Trail.

== History ==
A post office called Easley was established in 1893, and remained in operation until 1951. The community has the name of W. G. Easley, the original owner of the site.
