= Columbia Independent School =

Location
- 1801 N Stadium Blvd. Columbia, Missouri; USA
- Coordinates: 38°58′26″N 92°22′18″W

Information
- Type: Private College Preparatory
- Motto: "Per Educationem, Sapientiem, Civitas"
- Established: 1998
- Head teacher: Bridgid Kinney
- Grades: Pre-K–12
- Gender: Co-Educationional
- Enrollment: 418
- Campus: Suburban
- Colors: Blue and Gold
- Mascot: Leo the Lion
- Newspaper: Lions' Ledger
- Website: http://cislions.org

Columbia Independent School (CIS) is a private school and a prep school in Columbia, Missouri that serves 418 students in pre-kindergarten through twelfth grade. The school's curriculum emphasizes global perspectives.

== History ==
Columbia Independent School began in the fall of 1998, inspired by a group of families led by Justin Perry. The families sought to provide a unique educational opportunity for the growing community in Columbia, Missouri. Perry envisioned "a new independent, non-sectarian, academically challenging college preparatory school." By the end of 1996, 32 families committed to becoming founders of the new school. The next year was spent researching other independent schools, securing a location in Hickman Hall at Stephens College, hiring educators, and selecting a Head of School. Dee Corn, former principal at Hickman High School in Columbia, was selected as the Head of School and also functioned as the Director of the Upper School. A committee of founders selected the name "Columbia Independent School". Prospective students were given the opportunity to choose the mascot and school colors. The students chose the lion, a symbol of strength, pride and leadership, and the colors blue and gold.

In the fall of 1998, CIS opened its doors to 55 students in grades six through nine and a faculty composed of 16 teachers. Students and teachers attended a three-day retreat at the YMCA Trout Lodge in southern Missouri before school began. The retreat offered students informative sessions about expectations at CIS, as well as bonding activities. On the official first day, CIS released balloons as everyone passed under the arches. This became a tradition, the Balloon Launch, in which at the beginning of every school year, until the 2017-2018 school year, all students released either a blue or gold balloon into the sky. In each additional school year, a grade was added until the high school was complete. In the spring of 2002, CIS celebrated its first graduating class. In early 2016, some eighth grade students, launched a weather balloon. The balloon reached the stratosphere, and students were shown footage from the weather balloon's camera. The balloon also had a bag of potato chips on it. The remains of the balloon, which popped, are kept beside the Cube classroom. This became a yearly occurrence, until it was discontinued during the 2020-2021 school year.

With the success of the Upper School campus and the support of a group of the original founding families, the administration and board of trustees decided to launch a kindergarten through fifth grade campus. In the summer of 2002, CIS opened its Lower School program in the previous Sacred Heart Parish School. Barbara Savage, an educator since 1972 with an emphasis in gifted education, was appointed director for the Lower School. In the 2013-2014 school year, Chris Sayers replaced Beth Gardner as Lower School Director. Adam Dubé served as Head of School from 2013 to 2020, after which he was replaced by Dr. Jeffrey Walkington. Dr. Walkington served in the position for 10 months. In April 2021, longtime community member and Director of Advancement and Operations Bridgid Kinney was named as interim Head of School. The board of trustees named her the Head of School a month into the 2021-2022 school year.

In April 2008, CIS acquired the rights to a 62,000 sq ft (5,800 m^{2}) building at 1801 N Stadium, Columbia, MO. The former office building of Salton/Toastmaster was renovated to house CIS beginning in the 2009-2010 school year. This effectively doubled the space CIS previously occupied and brought all of CIS together under one roof. In 2020, the school purchased a tract of land next to its existing campus, with plans to expand there in the future. Currently, the new upper school addition, which is south of the original building, has been completed and is in use for the 2024-2025 school year.

== Athletics ==
Columbia Independent School is a member of the Missouri State High School Activities Association (MSHSAA), which governs the athletics of most schools within Missouri. The school's teams are designated the "Lions." Sponsored sports include cross country, basketball, track and field, cheerleading, and volleyball for Grades 6-12, and swimming, tennis, and golf for Grades 9-12. Due to size constraints, MSHSAA allows CIS students to participate in athletic programs of nearby public schools if that particular sport is not offered at CIS.

== Renovations ==
In spring 2016, the school began work on the Arts and Athletics Center, which added a stage and gymnasium. The media center was renovated in 2021. A new Upper School building was added, which was opened in August 2024.
