= University of Missouri College of Agriculture, Food and Natural Resources =

Agricultural school of the University of Missouri

College of Agriculture, Food and Natural Resources
- Type: Public
- Established: 1870
- Dean: Christopher R. Daubert
- Undergraduates: 2,428
- Postgraduates: 384
- Location: Columbia, Missouri, USA; 38°56′34″N 92°19′29″W
- Nickname: CAFNR
- Website: cafnr.missouri.edu

The College of Agriculture, Food and Natural Resources (CAFNR) at the University of Missouri is a teaching and research institution that includes 15 degree programs and six academic/research divisions. Areas of study range from animal and plant sciences to biochemistry, agribusiness management, science and agricultural journalism, animal science, fisheries and wildlife, and atmospheric science.

In 2018, there were more than 2,428 undergraduate and 384 graduate students studying in CAFNR.

CAFNR has the highest sponsored research expenditures on the MU campus ($31,873,581 in 2010). The college is ranked among the Top 15 programs in the world for animal and plant science research (Thomson Reuters).

CAFNR operates the Agricultural Experiment Station, a network of several research centers around Missouri designed to meet the regional research and demonstration needs of agricultural producers and natural resource managers.

CAFNR's research efforts have regional and international economic impact. Projects include a drought simulator that allows scientists to develop drought tolerant crops, an inexpensive genetic tool to judge the economic value of cattle, and a study to determine the connection between eating breakfast and obesity.

The Food and Agricultural Policy Research Institute (FAPRI), part of the Division of Applied Social Sciences, conducts research in national and global agricultural policy. Its researchers regularly testify before Congress.

CAFNR's marketing tag line is Collaborating for the Greater Good, a recognition of its long culture of interdisciplinary partnerships that result in discoveries that could not be easily obtained by researchers in a single area.

== History ==
The College of Agriculture and Mechanical Arts was established on February 24, 1870. The college has undergone several name changes since then. Most recently it was renamed the College of Agriculture, Food and Natural Resources (CAFNR). The college is the only one of its type in Missouri.

George C. Swallow was the first professor and dean of the college. The program enjoyed immense growth during its early years, but class sizes dwindled past the turn of the century due to inadequate staffing and underdeveloped academic curricula.

With increased funding by the state and the appointment of Frederick B. Mumford as dean in 1909, conditions dramatically improved. In addition to producing positive results for the college, Mumford convinced University administrators that space was needed for the college to flourish. As a result, several new buildings were constructed to house the program. They were the veterinary building (1911), Schweitzer Hall (1912), the hog cholera serum plant (1915), Gwynn Hall (1920), Mumford Hall (1925) and Eckles Hall (1938). Many of these buildings are still used by the college.

In 1989, the School of Natural Resources (SNR) was formed and housed within CAFNR. Some of SNR's programs originated up to 80 years ago. It is the Midwest's only school with a comprehensive natural resources program, encompassing atmospheric science, fisheries, forestry, parks, recreation, soils, tourism and wildlife.

== Divisions ==
Divisions in CAFNR are Animal Sciences; Applied Social Sciences; Biochemistry; Food, Nutrition, and Exercise Sciences; Plant Science & Technology; and the School of Natural Resources.

=== Animal Sciences ===
The degrees offered in the Animal Sciences division are:

- Animal Sciences
- Captive Wild Animal Management
- Equine Science and Management

=== Applied Social Sciences ===
The degrees offered in the Applied Social Sciences division are:

- Agribusiness Management
- Agricultural & Natural Resources Communications
- Agricultural and Applied Economics
- Agricultural Education
- Agricultural Leadership
- Agricultural Leadership, Communication and Education
- Food and Hospitality Systems
- Hospitality Management
- Personal Financial Planning
- Society and Sustainability

=== Biochemistry ===
The degree offered in the Biochemistry division is:

- Biochemistry

=== Food, Nutrition & Exercise Sciences ===
The degrees offered in the Food, Nutrition & Exercise division are:

- Dietetics
- Food and Hospitality Systems
- Food Safety and Defense
- Food Science and Nutrition
- Nutrition and Exercise Physiology
- Nutritional Sciences
- Wellness

=== Plant Science & Technology ===
The degrees offered in the Plant Science & Technology division are:

- Agricultural Systems Technology
- Floral Artistry and Management
- Food and Hospitality Systems
- Landscape Design
- Plant Sciences
- Plant, Insect and Microbial Sciences
- Precision Agriculture Technology

=== School of Natural Resources ===
The degrees offered at the School of Natural Resources are:

- Agroforestry
- Captive Wild Animal Management
- Coaching Sports
- Environmental Sciences
- Natural Resource Science and Management
- Natural Resources
- Parks, Recreation, Sport and Tourism
- Sustainability
