= Henry Kirklin =

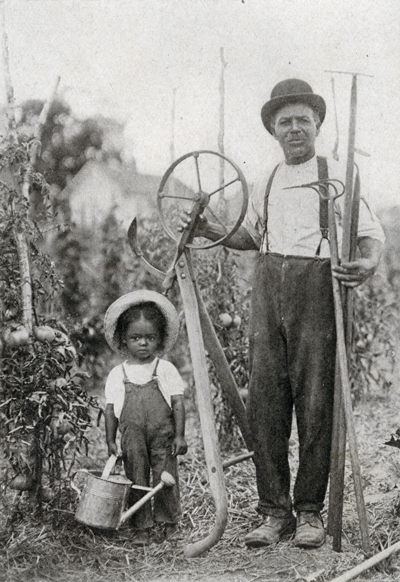
Henry Kirklin with a child in his garden

Henry Kirklin was an horticulturist, businessman, and first African-American instructor at the University of Missouri. He achieved international fame for horticulture and was described by the Columbia Missourian as "one of the best-known plant authorities of his era". Freed from slavery at the age of five, Kirklin would learn horticulture from German immigrants. At age fourteen he became greenhouse supervisor at the University of Missouri; his ability was quickly recognized and he soon began instructing classes. He taught both at his home garden and on the steps of the university greenhouse, as at the time the university was segregated. He was officially recognized as the school's first black instructor by President Mun Choi with the dedication of the Henry Kirklin Plant Sciences Learning Laboratory in the College of Agriculture, Food, and Natural Resources in 2021. He has also been honored with a marker on Columbia's African American Heritage Trail, which stands near his former home and garden. He died in 1938 and is buried in Columbia Cemetery; his grave remained unmarked for eighty-two years until a campaign to fund a grave marker in 2020.
