= Jack D. Crouch =

American businessman

- Born: Jack Dyer Crouch; October 22, 1915; Columbia, Missouri, U.S.
- Died: July 25, 1989 (aged 73); Columbia, Missouri, U.S.
- Occupations: Hotelier; restaurauteur
- Known for: Co-founding Hyatt Hotels
- Spouses: Mary Margaret Munro (m. 1956, divorced); Patricia Renee
- Children: 6, including Jack Dyer II

Jack Dyer Crouch (October 22, 1915 – July 25, 1989) was an American entrepreneur and conglomerate organizer.

== Early life ==
Crouch was born in Columbia, Missouri and served in the United States Army during World War II.

== Career ==
Crouch co-founded the Hyatt Hotel chain in 1954 with his partner Hyatt Robert von Dehn, and later became a Hilton Hotel franchise owner in the United States.

He is credited with conceptualizing and building the world's first fly-in (airport) hotel, The Hyatt House Los Angeles.

Prior to that, Crouch owned "Jack's on the Strip" in Hollywood, one of the first drive-through restaurants in California. It was there that he would meet von Dehn, who would soon invest in his airport-hotel concept.

== Personal life and death ==
Crouch had four sons: J. Richard Crouch, Jack Dyer Crouch II, Robert Crouch, and Michael Crouch; and two daughters: Cathy Crouch and Michelle Crouch. He died of lung cancer in Columbia, Missouri on July 25, 1989.

His son Jack Dyer Crouch II is a former Assistant Secretary of Defense, U.S. Ambassador to Romania, Deputy National Security Adviser, and Assistant to the President. Also, from 1993 to 2001, Crouch was associate professor of defense and strategic Studies at Southwest Missouri State University. He was member of the board of editors of Comparative Strategy and a member of the board of advisers of the Center for Security Policy. While at Missouri, he also served as a reserve deputy sheriff in Christian County.

== See also ==
- List of American restaurateurs
- List of entrepreneurs
- List of people from Columbia, Missouri
- List of people from Los Angeles
