= Edwin Moss Watson =

Edwin Moss Watson (1867–1937) was a newspaper editor and publisher in Columbia, Missouri.

== Biography ==
He was born in Millersburg, a small town in Callaway County, Missouri, on November 29, 1867, the first son and second child of six of Dr. Berry Allen Watson (1833–1918), a general-practice physician, and Clara Ward (1842–1927), an author.

In 1872 the family moved from Millersburg to Columbia, a larger city in adjacent Boone County. Watson's primary and secondary education were at the Mission School and the Columbia Female Baptist Academy (the latter a predecessor of Stephens College), both in Columbia. He remained in Columbia for his higher education, earning an A.B. degree in 1890 from the University of Missouri, where he was a member of Phi Beta Kappa.

He began his career as a journalist while a young teenager, going to work in 1881 as a printer's devil on the Columbia Herald, where he moved through several jobs until 1890, when he became a reporter on the St. Joseph Ballot in St. Joseph, Missouri. After a year at the Ballot, he moved to Ft. Worth, Texas, where he worked as a reporter for two years on a predecessor to the Ft. Worth Star-Telegram.

In 1894 he interrupted his career in journalism to return to Columbia, where he entered law school, from which he graduated in 1897. That year he entered private law practice and was elected city attorney in Columbia.

He resumed newspaper work after a year of law practice, working as editor of the Jefferson City State Tribune in Jefferson City, Missouri from 1899 to 1901 and as a reporter on the St. Louis Star and the St. Louis Republic in St. Louis, Missouri from 1901 to 1905.

In 1905 he acquired the Columbia Daily Tribune in Columbia, Missouri and became its editor and publisher (calling himself "editor and proprietor"). He worked in that position until his death in 1937.

Watson voted the straight Democratic ticket and consistently supported the Democratic Party in his editorials. He also strongly opposed prohibition. He never drove a car, never married, and lived with and cared for his mother from his father's death until hers. He was known as "Col. Watson" although he never served in the military; he came by the title "more or less honestly," he said, when Guy B. Park, governor of Missouri from 1933 to 1937, named him an honorary colonel on his staff.

He fell ill on November 14, 1937, the day after he wrote his last editorial, and died at Boone County Hospital in Columbia on November 30, 1937, from a cerebral hemorrhage. He was buried at Columbia Cemetery.

Being cited for "his colorful editorials often calling for community improvements," he was inducted into the Missouri Press Association Hall of Fame in 2005.
