= Curators of the University of Missouri =

- Formation: 1839
- Purpose: educational oversight
- Headquarters: 316 University Hall; Columbia, Missouri, U.S.
- Members: 4 public institutions
- Website: www.umsystem.edu/curators/

The Board of Curators of the University of Missouri is a body consisting of nine members that governs the University of Missouri System, four state universities in the U.S. state of Missouri. In addition to these four universities, it also supervises and coordinates University of Missouri Health Care, the University of Missouri Extension, and a number of research locations across the state.

== History ==
From 1839-1963 the board governed the University of Missouri in Columbia, Missouri. In 1963, upon the formation of the University of Missouri System, the Curators assumed leadership, appointing a President of the University of Missouri System, in addition to chancellors to lead each campus.

== Member selection ==
The board of curators has nine members, each of whom is appointed by the Governor of Missouri with the advice and consent of the Missouri Senate. Curators serve six-year terms, staggered by three positions expiring every two years. Not more than one curator can be appointed from the same congressional district, and no more than five curators can belong to the same political party. In addition, there is a non-voting student representative to the board, likewise appointed and confirmed, who serves a two-year term. The post is rotated among the four universities. Presently, this position is unfilled.

The board of curators selects the president of the system, who reports to the board along with the general counsel. Each campus is led by a chancellor who reports to the president, as does an executive vice president, four vice presidents, and a chief of staff. The president chairs the University of Missouri Health System advisory board. Each Board Member also serves on various committees that address higher education issues.

- Lyda Krewson, District 1, St. Louis
- Robert D. Blitz, District 2, St. Louis
- Jeanne Cairnes Sinquefield, District 3, Westphalia
- Robert W. Fry, District 4, Greenwood
- Michael A. Williams, District 5 Kansas City
- Todd P. Graves, District 6, Edgerton
- Jeffrey L. Layman, District 7, Springfield
- John M. Raines, District 8, Senath
- Blaine Luetkemeyer, At-large member, St. Elizabeth

=== Notable past curators ===
- Thomas M. Allen
- Alban Jasper Conant
- William P. Elmer
- David Henry Hickman
- James S. Rollins
- Gideon Frank Rothwell
- Edwin William Stephens
- David Steward
- William Franklin Switzler
- David Wasinger

== Schools governed by the Board of Curators ==
The Curators oversee 4 institutions, one of which, the University of Missouri is the flagship of the system.

School	Location(s)	Control	Type^{[b]}	Enrollment	Founded
University of Missouri	Columbia	State university	Doctoral/very high activity research university	33,266	1839
University of Missouri–Kansas City	Kansas City	State university	Doctoral/high activity research university	16,944	1933
Missouri University of Science and Technology	Rolla	State university	Doctoral/high activity research university	8,838	1870
University of Missouri–St. Louis	St. Louis	State University	Doctoral/high activity research university	16,989	1963

== See also ==
- List of colleges and universities in Missouri
- Education in Missouri
