= Thomas M. Allen (Missouri clergyman) =

American clergyman

- Born: October 21, 1797; Warren County, Virginia, United States
- Died: October 10, 1871 (aged 73)
- Occupation: Clergyman
- Known for: Establishing the Christian Church (Disciples of Christ) in Missouri, President of the board of curators of the University of Missouri
- Spouse: Rebecca Russell

Thomas M. Allen (October 21, 1797 – October 10, 1871) was an American clergyman who played a prominent role in establishing the Christian Church (Disciples of Christ) in Missouri.

He was born in Warren County, Virginia (then part of Shenandoah County) in 1797. He studied law at Transylvania University, and married Rebecca Russell in 1819. He was subsequently ordained to the ministry in Fayette County, Kentucky, later moving to Boone County, Missouri, in 1836. He achieved recognition outside of the church as well, serving as the president of the board of curators of the University of Missouri in 1839, 1841, and 1864. Also instrumental in the founding of Columbia College (Columbia, Missouri) in 1851 as Christian Women's College. It was renamed in 1970 when the college became co-educational.

He died in 1871.
