= Providence, Boone County, Missouri =

Unincorporated community in Missouri, U.S.

Coordinates: 38°50′15″N 92°24′20″W

Providence is an unincorporated community in Boone County, in the U.S. state of Missouri. Providence was the main port on the Missouri River for supplies to headed to Columbia, Missouri. Providence Road in Columbia is named after the community.

== History ==
A post office called Providence was established in 1844, and remained in operation until 1918. The first settlers named the community for the divine providence which they believed guided them to it.
