= Zbylut Twardowski =

Polish-American nephrologist

Zbylut Twardowski was a Polish-American nephrologist, known for his pioneering work on dialysis. His patented dialysis machines and catheters are commonly found in hospitals and dialysis centers worldwide. Twardowski was associated with the Department of Internal Medicine at the University of Missouri in Columbia, Missouri.
