= Kraig Kann =

American sportscaster (born 1966)

Kraig Kann (born on May 3, 1966, in LaGrange, Illinois) is a former on-air personality on Golf Channel, former chief communications officer of the LPGA, and current Managing Director of Kann Advisory Group and Host on SiriusXM PGA TOUR Radio.

== Golf Channel ==
Kann was one of Golf Channel’s original on-air personalities Golf Channel from its founding in 1995 until his announced resignation on August 17, 2011, to assume an administrative position at the LPGA. While at Golf Channel, he was involved in a variety of broadcast positions, including Golf Central, Golf Central Pre-Game and as a play-by-play announcer for PGA Tour, LPGA, and Nationwide Tour coverage. He also reported on-site for the station's coverage of The Masters, the U.S. Open, the Open Championship, the PGA Championship, and the Ryder Cup.

== Prior broadcasting career ==
Kann is a 1988 graduate of the University of Missouri. Prior to joining Golf Channel, Kann spent time in Kalamazoo, Michigan, Fort Myers, Columbus, Georgia, and Columbia, Missouri.

== Personal life ==
Kann was born in the Chicago suburb of LaGrange, Illinois and grew up in the neighboring suburb of Western Springs. He currently resides in Orlando, Florida. Kann has three adult children.
