= Christian Fellowship School =

Protestant school in Missouri

Coordinates: 38°57′16″N 92°24′12″W

- Columbia, Missouri; United States

Information
- Established: 1981; 45 years ago
- Grades: PreK - 12
- Enrollment: 430
- Colors: Red and Black
- Mascot: Knights
- Accreditation: Cognia
- Website: cfsknights.org

Christian Fellowship School (CFS) is a private Protestant Christian school in Columbia, Missouri. CFS educates from preschool through twelfth grade.

== History ==
CFS began in 1981 with an original enrollment of 24 students. The school has grown to approximately 430 students and employs over 100 full-time, part-time, and seasonal faculty and staff, serving preschool through high school. CFS students come from over 35 different congregations in the Columbia and Boone County area, including Baptist, Lutheran, Disciples of Christ, Evangelical Free, Presbyterian, Assembly of God, and nondenominational churches.

== Curriculum ==
Several curriculum brands are used in daily instruction from the preschool level through 12th grade. These primarily include A Beka and BJU Press. Art, music, PE, chapel, band, library and computer skills classes supplement this curriculum. Some secular texts are approved in the middle and high school levels. High school students in CFS are able to access the Missouri A+ schools program. CFS has dual-enrollment partnerships with multiple universities, allowing students to earn up to 50 college credit hours.

== Activities ==
As of 2025, CFS is a full member of the Missouri State High School Activities Association. In the fall, boys soccer, girls volleyball, and cross country are offered. Girls softball, boys swimming, and boys middle school football are also available through cooperative agreements. In the winter months, boys' and girls' basketball along with both varsity and junior varsity cheerleading are offered. Girls swimming is also available during this season, through a cooperative. The spring months include girls' soccer, boys baseball, and a coed track team. Christian Fellowship School's sport's teams compete against other private and public school teams throughout the state of Missouri.

CFS also offers an Esports team (National Champions 2020), weight lifting, Lego robotics team, yearbook team and drama team. Each year the drama team performs a play for the school and community. Students compete in a variety of academic areas including art, science projects, musical pieces and performances, written work, and mathematical competitions. CFS participates in local regional competitions sponsored through MSHSAA, as well as the Midwest Academic and Fine Arts Festival in Kansas City, Missouri.

The school has official chapters for both Student Council as well as the National Honor Society.

== Affiliation ==
CFS is a member of Association of Christian Schools International (ACSI) and the Oral Roberts University Educational Fellowship (ORUEF). CFS is accredited through the International Christian Accrediting Association (ICAA) and Cognia. CFS is a ministry of Christian Fellowship Church.
