= Fleda Brown =

American poet and author

- Born: Fleda Sue Brown; 1944 (age 81–82); Columbia, Missouri, U.S.
- Education: University of Arkansas (English Ph.D)
- Occupations: Poet; professor; teacher
- Organizations: University of Delaware; Pacific Lutheran University
- Known for: Poet laureate of Delaware, 2001–2007
- Children: Two
- Writing career
- Genre: Poetry
- Notable awards: Porter Prize (2001)
- Website: fledabrown.com

Fleda Brown (born 1944 in Columbia, Missouri) is an American poet and author. She is also known as Fleda Brown Jackson.

== Biography ==
Fleda Brown was born in Columbia, Missouri, and was raised in Fayetteville, Arkansas. In 1978, she joined the University of Delaware English Department. There she founded the Poets in the Schools Program, which she directed for more than twelve years. She served as poet laureate of Delaware from 2001 to 2007, when she retired from the University of Delaware and moved to Traverse City, Michigan. She currently teaches in the Rainier Writing Workshop, a low-residency MFA program at Pacific Lutheran University in Tacoma, Washington. Her husband, Jerry Beasley, is also a retired English professor.

One of Brown's poems, "If I Were a Swan", has been set for choir by Kevin Puts.

== Education ==
- Ph.D. (English, Pre-1900 American Literature), University of Arkansas, Fayetteville, Arkansas, 1983
- M.A. (English), University of Arkansas, Fayetteville, Arkansas, 1976
- B.A. (English), University of Arkansas, Fayetteville, Arkansas, 1969

== Bibliography ==
Poetry

- Fishing with Blood (Purdue University Press, 1988), ISBN 9780911198942, OCLC 17202526 – won the Great Lakes Colleges New Writer's Award
- The Eleusinian Mysteries MS (poems and images: limited edition artbook, The Moment Press, 1992) – with Norman Sasowsky
- Do Not Peel the Birches (Purdue University Press, 1993)
- The Earliest House (chapbook, Kutztown University, 1994)
- Devil's Child (Carnegie-Mellon University Press, 1998), ISBN 9780887482885, OCLC 41226060
- Breathing In Breathing Out (Anhinga Press, 2002) – won 2001 Philip Levine Prize for Poetry
- The Women Who Loved Elvis All Their Lives (Carnegie-Mellon University Press, 2004), ISBN 9780887484032, OCLC 55071858
- Reunion (University of Wisconsin Press, 2007), ISBN 9780299221805, OCLC 71552368 – won 2007 Felix Pollak Prize in Poetry
- The woods are on fire : new and selected poems, Lincoln : University of Nebraska Press, 2017. ISBN 9780803294943, OCLC 957705124

Anthologies

- Critical Essays on D.H. Lawrence (G. K. Hall & Company, 1988) – co-edited with Dennis Jackson
- On the Mason-Dixon Line: An Anthology of Contemporary Delaware Writers (University of Delaware Press, 2008) – co-edited with Billie Travalini
