= Guy Sumner Lowman Jr. =

American linguist

Guy Somner Lowman Jr. (Columbia, Missouri, 1909–1941) was an American linguist who received a bachelor's degree from the University of Wisconsin–Madison in 1929 and a Ph.D. in philosophy from the University of London in 1931. From 1931 to 1933 he was a Sterling Fellow at Yale University. He worked as a chief field investigator for the Linguistic Atlas of the United States and Canada from 1931 to 1941, interviewing more than a thousand informants along the eastern seaboard of the United States and Canada. He also conducted field interviews in Southern England to find correspondences in English and American dialects. He was a member of the Modern Language Association and served as chairman of the phonetics section.

After his death in 1941, the University of Wisconsin–Madison established the Guy S. Lowman Scholarship to further research in linguistics.

== Literature ==
- Kurath, Hans, with Miles L. Hanley, Bernard Bloch, Guy S. Lowman Jr. and Marcus L. Hansen. 1939–1941. Linguistic Atlas of New England. 2 volumes, Providence, RI: Brown University. Reprint edition, 3 volumes, New York: AMS Press, 1972.
- Kurath, Hans and Guy S. Lowman Jr. 1961. The Dialectal Structure of Southern England: Phonological Evidence. University, Alabama: University of Alabama Press.(= Publications of the American Dialect Society 54)
- Viereck, Wolfgang. 1975. Lexikalische und grammatische Ergebnisse des Lowman-Survey von Mittel- und Südengland. 2 volumes. München: Wilhelm Fink.

== Sources ==
- Voices from the Days of Slavery - Interviewer Biographies (American Memory from the Library of Congress)
