= Don Nardo =

American historian, composer, and writer (born 1947)

Don Nardo (born February 22, 1947) is an American historian, composer, and writer. With more than five hundred and forty published books, he is one of the most prolific authors in the United States, and one of the country's foremost writers of historical works for children and teens.

== History ==
=== Childhood and education ===
Don Nardo was born in Columbia, Missouri.

With his younger brother, Philip (born 1949), Nardo spent the first few years of his life on the road with his parents, who were popular nightclub entertainers who traveled throughout the country.

In the early 1950s, the family settled in Natick, Massachusetts, where Nardo was at first home-schooled, but he later attended the local public schools. As he grew older, he developed an interest in many of the fields he would later pursue professionally, including acting, music, history, and writing. In high school, he performed in numerous plays and was voted best actor in his senior class. Outside of school, he learned to play the trumpet and began composing chamber and orchestral music, including a four-movement symphony at age fourteen. However, having little formal musical training, he was initially unable to notate these pieces properly, so in the next few years he taught himself to do so by studying books on orchestration.

After graduating from high school in 1965, Nardo majored in theater at Syracuse University, but left after a few semesters to pursue an acting career in New York City. Later, in the 1970s, he returned to school, graduating magna cum laude with a degree in history from Worcester State College (now Worcester State University).

=== Early professional work ===
As a young character actor, Nardo appeared in numerous stage productions, including work in summer stock in upstate New York and dinner theater in the American South. He also worked with the National Shakespeare Company under producer-director Philip Meister, including productions of Macbeth, Othello, and As You Like It. Later, Nardo's theatrical interests shifted more to writing screenplays and teleplays. While working on his first few scripts, he taught high school social studies and English in Barnstable, Massachusetts. One of these screenplays, The Bet, won a $5,000 award from the Massachusetts Artists Foundation in 1982. Among the teleplays was an episode of ABC's Spenser: For Hire, starring Robert Urich. Titled "Skeletons in the Closet," it guest starred E.G. Marshall and Boyd Gaines. Nardo also co-wrote, produced and directed a low-budget feature film, In Deadly Heat, which was distributed as Stuff Stephanie in the Incinerator by Troma Entertainment and released to the video market in 1990 by Media Home Entertainment.

=== Writing career ===
Although Nardo had avidly studied history informally since childhood and had acquired a degree in history in the 1970s, he did not begin writing history books until the 1980s. A chance assignment by a Boston-based publisher to write several chapters of a new high-school-level history textbook led to offers from several young adult publishers. In the years that followed, the offers kept coming, as did positive reviews from School Library Journal, Booklist, and other noted journals. He joined the Association of Ancient Historians in the 1990s. And by 2004, he had penned more than a hundred books about the Greeks, Romans, Egyptians, Assyrians, Babylonians, Persians, and other ancient peoples. In that same year, noted classical historian Victor Davis Hanson stated online: “There is an entire series of great children’s books [about ancient history] by Don Nardo, who has emerged as the premier practitioner of that important craft." At the request of Chelsea House, Scholastic, Lucent Books, Compass Point Books, Morgan Reynolds, and other publishers, Nardo also wrote numerous books about medieval civilization, among them a biography of the eccentric Danish astronomer Tycho Brahe that won a special commendation by the National Science Teachers Association. In addition, he fulfilled numerous requests to write books about modern history, including several studies of Native American culture, America's wars, and the U.S. founders and their writings. His 2012 book Migrant Mother was nominated for numerous best book of the year awards and won the Spur Award for Best Western Juvenile Nonfiction, as well as citations from the Bank Street Children's Book Committee, the Midwest Independent Publishers Association, and the Pennsylvania School Librarians Association. Another 2012 volume, Destined for Space, won an award from the American Astronautical Society. Moreover, in September 2014, for the first time Nardo briefly switched his focus from nonfiction to fiction by publishing his first novel, titled Cloak of Destiny. He calls it a "cosmic mystery." One of its main story lines, he says, deals with a modern archaeologist who "has discovered an astonishing secret in the deserts of Israel, revealing some startling previously unknown truths about humankind’s place in the universe." That excavator has "no doubt in his mind" that when the public finds out about these mind-bending discoveries, "the world as people now know it will change forever."

=== Music ===
Meanwhile, Nardo continued to compose music, including seven more symphonies; concertos for violin, cello, piano, clarinet, French horn, trumpet, and bassoon; a double concerto for violin, cello, and orchestra; a triple concerto for clarinet, horn, piano, and orchestra; a piano trio; two piano sonatas; seven string quartets; a ballet based on the exploits of Cleopatra; a dectet (chamber work for ten players); a musical tribute to Thomas Jefferson; incidental music for stage plays, including a large-scale school production of The Hobbit, for which he also conducted the pit orchestra; several romances arranged for strings or orchestra; an oratorio based on the King Arthur legends, and other works. In 1987 the Cape Cod Symphony Orchestra, conducted by Royston Nash, commissioned him to compose a concert piece for children based on H.G. Wells's The War of the Worlds. A more recent commission came in 2008 from Portuguese-American violinist Pedro Ferreira—a double concerto for violin and Portuguese guitar, the first major concert piece ever written for the latter instrument. Between 2008 and 2010, Nardo was the resident composer and arranger for Ferreira's Connecticut-based Amadis Orchestra. Another commission from the Cape Cod Symphony, now under conductor Jung-Ho Pak, came in 2011, part of the orchestra's 50th anniversary celebration. Titled Cape Cod Impressions, the large-scale orchestral piece was accompanied by photos of the Cape projected onto huge screens and received standing ovations at all performances. In 2013, Nardo completed another commission from Peter Ferreira, this time a set of more than a dozen orchestral arrangements of popular songs for a special pops concert in which Ferreira performed with Connecticut's Cheshire Symphony Orchestra, conducted by Richard Brooks.

== Personal life ==
Nardo has been married twice. The first union produced a son, Dana (born 1972), who became a graphic artist and animator. Nardo and his second wife, Christine, are avid animal lovers who have a particular fondness for dogs. They also enjoy traveling and have made frequent trips to Greece and other countries that Nardo frequently writes about.

== Selected works ==
- Gravity: The Universal Force. Lucent Books, 1990. ISBN 1-56006-204-5
- World War II: The War in the Pacific. Lucent Books, 1991. ISBN 1-56006-408-0
- Anxiety and Phobias. Chelsea House, 1992. ISBN 0-7910-0041-9
- Charles Darwin. Chelsea House, 1993. ISBN 0-7910-1729-X
- Medical Diagnosis. Chelsea House, 1993. ISBN 0-7910-0067-2
- Greek and Roman Theater. Lucent Books, 1994. ISBN 1-56006-249-5
- The Battle of Marathon. Lucent Books, 1995. ISBN 1-56006-412-9
- The Age of Pericles. Lucent Books, 1996. ISBN 1-56006-303-3
- The Bill of Rights. Greenhaven Press, 1997. ISBN 1-56510-740-3
- The Medieval Castle. Lucent Books, 1998. ISBN 1-56006-430-7
- Readings on Romeo and Juliet. Editor, Greenhaven Press, 1998. ISBN 1-56510-646-6
- The Rise of Nazi Germany. Editor, Greenhaven Press, 1998. ISBN 1-56510-965-1
- Readings on Sophocles' Antigone. Editor, Greenhaven Press, 1999. ISBN 1-56510-969-4
- Greek and Roman Sport. Lucent Books, 1999. ISBN 1-56006-436-6
- Readings on Othello. Editor, Greenhaven Press, 2000. ISBN 0-7377-0187-0
- Francisco Coronado. Franklin Watts, 2001. ISBN 0-531-11974-2
- Daily Life in Ancient Rome. KidHaven Press, 2002. ISBN 0-7377-0612-0
- Life of a Roman Gladiator. Lucent Books, 2003. ISBN 1-59018-253-7
- Andrew Johnson. Children's Press, 2004. ISBN 0-516-24242-3
- The Byzantine Empire. Blackbirch Press, 2005. ISBN 1-4103-0586-4
- The Age of Colonialism. Lucent Books, 2006. ISBN 1-59018-833-0
- Greenhaven Encyclopedia of Ancient Mesopotamia. Greenhaven Press, 2007. ISBN 0-7377-3441-8
- History of Architecture. Lucent Books, 2008. ISBN 1-4205-0003-1
- Julius Caesar: Roman General and Statesman. Compass Point Books, 2009. ISBN 978-0-7565-3834-7
- Alexander the Great: Conqueror of the Known World. Morgan Reynolds, 2010. ISBN 1-59935-126-9
- The Islamic Empire. Gale, Cengage, 2011. ISBN 1-4205-0634-X
- The Birth of Christianity. Morgan Reynolds, 2012. ISBN 1-59935-145-5
- Persian Mythology. Gale, Cengage, 2013. ISBN 1-420-50794-X
- The Presidency of Franklin D. Roosevelt. Compass Point Books, 2014. ISBN 978-075654927-5
- Daily Life in Ancient Egypt. Raintree (England), 2015. ISBN 978-140628807-0
- Deadliest Dinosaurs. Reference Point Books, 2016. ISBN 978-1682820483
- Teens and Eating Disorders. Reference Point Press, 2017. ISBN 978-1682821220
- Transgender Life. Gale/Cengage, 2018. ISBN 978-1410380999
- Classic Stories of Greek Mythology. Reference Point Press, 2019. ISBN 1682826198
- Why Should I Care About the Greeks? Capstone Press, 2020. ISBN 0756565650
- Understanding Gender Identity. Reference Point Press, 2021. ISBN 1678201782
- Important Black Americans in Science and Invention. Reference Point Press, 2022. ISBN 1678202886
- Exploring Indian Mythology. Reference Point Press, 2023. ISBN 978-1-6782-0480-8
