= Sturgeon, Missouri =

- City
- City of Sturgeon
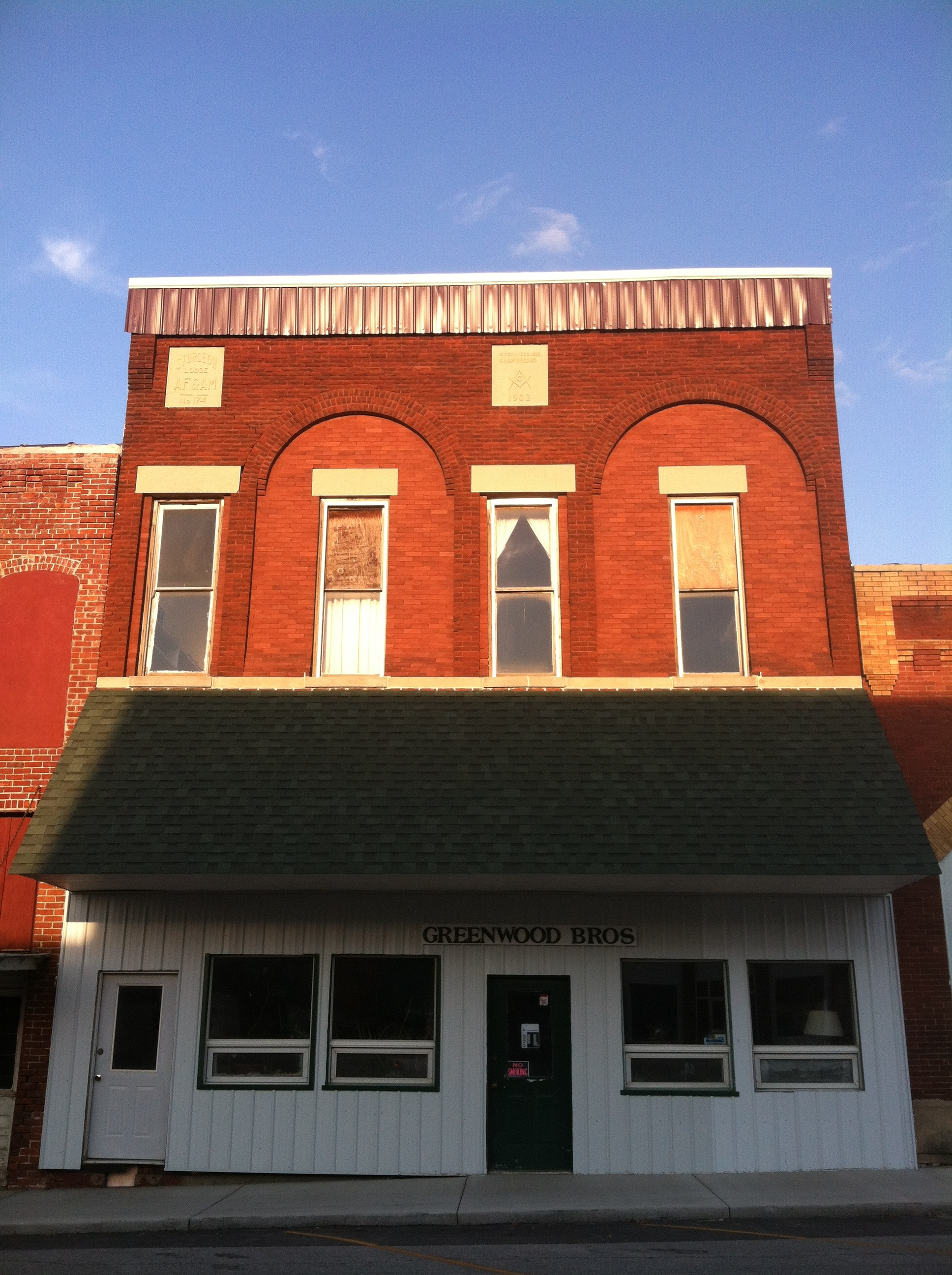
- Sturgeon Masonic Lodge

- Location of Sturgeon, Missouri
- Coordinates: 39°14′05″N 92°16′55″W
- Country: United States
- State: Missouri
- County: Boone
- Founded: 1856

Area
  - Total: 0.87 sq mi (2.25 km^{2})
  - Land: 0.87 sq mi (2.25 km^{2})
  - Water: 0 sq mi (0.00 km^{2})
- Elevation: 850 ft (260 m)

Population (2020)
  - Total: 907
  - Density: 1,042.4/sq mi (402.46/km^{2})
- Time zone: UTC-6 (Central (CST))
  - Summer (DST): UTC-5 (CDT)
- ZIP code: 65284
- Area code: 573
- FIPS code: 29-71224
- GNIS feature ID: 2395992
- Website: www.sturgeon-mo.org

Sturgeon is a city in Boone County, Missouri, United States. It is part of the Columbia, Missouri Metropolitan Statistical Area. As of the 2020 census, Sturgeon had a population of 907.

== History ==
Sturgeon was laid out in 1856 very near to and eventually including the town of Prairie City. The town was incorporated in 1859 with Housen Canada as the first mayor and rechartered in 1875. It was named for Isaac H. Sturgeon, superintendent of the North Missouri Railroad. Colonel W. F. Switzler speculated that the depot was considered in Sturgeon because it bore the name of the railroad magnate, but six citizens who paid six thousand dollars finalized the deal. The first school-house was built in 1857, and in 1882 the white and colored schools had 301 students with an average daily attendance of 187. The first church, built in 1859, was the Methodist Episcopal Church South, with the Masonic lodge located above. The first early industry in Sturgeon was the broom factory, established in 1878, of S. A. Fretwell. The brooms were made of broom corn grown in the area, and brushes made of imported jute. In 1882, the factory turned out about 360 brooms daily

In the spring of 1857, a tornado passed over the town and blew down several houses, including a new building of 300 square feet (27.87 m^{2}) and three stories tall, purposed for a hotel. The first large fire took place on July 19, 1882. That evening, a fire was discovered in Wood's Saloon, already bursting through the roof. The butcher's shop, three saloons, three large livery stable buildings and sheds, and three other buildings were burned. The Sturgeon Savings Bank was saved from fire "by covering the roof with carpet and sprinkling heavily with salt."

In the fall of 1953, the first Amish family moved to the land just north of Sturgeon. Now the community has expanded to over sixty families. Most of the Sturgeon Amish adhere closely to their beliefs and are classified as Old Order Amish, meaning they follow a very conservative Ordnung: self-sufficiency, charity, and individualism are very important. The community in Sturgeon and Clark operate many successful home businesses, selling sorghum, eggs, chicken, peanut brittle and produce in season.

In May 2024, Sturgeon police officer Myron Woodson shot and killed a blind and deaf Shih Tzu dog, Teddy, aged 5 and weighing 13 pounds. Teddy had wandered into another Sturgeon resident's yard, leading to the resident feeding him water and contacting the authorities in an attempt to find his owner, with the authorities sending officer Woodson. Body camera footage showed Woodson shooting the dog twice after three minutes of Woodson repeatedly failing to capture the dog, which ran or walked away from the officer, without growling or trying to bite the officer. When the dog's owner questioned Woodson about the killing, Woodson replied: "What am I supposed to do? We don't have freaking animal control." After the incident, the Sturgeon resident (who had contacted authorities) declared that the dog was not aggressive and "was in no way a threat to others". One day after the shooting, the city of Sturgeon first commented that the dog was "behaving strangely and displaying signs of possible injuries" and seemingly "rabid behavior"; four days after the shooting, the city commented that after having "reviewed the dispatch report and body camera footage", the city "believes that the officer acted within his authority". After the incident was reported internationally and widespread public backlash ensued, Sturgeon mayor Kevin Abrahamson resigned six days after the shooting, while stand-in mayor Seth Truesdell denounced Woodson's actions.

== Geography ==
Sturgeon is located just south of the northern border of Boone County, approximately two miles east of U.S. Route 63, along Missouri Route CC. According to the United States Census Bureau, the city has a total area of 0.78 square miles (2.02 km^{2}), all land.

== Demographics ==
Historical population
Census	Pop.	Note	%±
1880	656		—
1890	713		8.7%
1900	708		−0.7%
1910	663		−6.4%
1920	728		9.8%
1930	600		−17.6%
1940	571		−4.8%
1950	544		−4.7%
1960	619		13.8%
1970	787		27.1%
1980	901		14.5%
1990	838		−7.0%
2000	944		12.6%
2010	872		−7.6%
2020	907		4.0%
U.S. Decennial Census

=== 2010 census ===
As of the census of 2010, there were 872 people, 361 households, and 244 families living in the city. The population density was 1,117.9 inhabitants per square mile (431.6/km^{2}). There were 401 housing units at an average density of 514.1 per square mile (198.5/km^{2}). The racial makeup of the city was 96.8% White, 0.5% African American, 0.7% Native American, 0.6% Asian, 0.6% from other races, and 0.9% from two or more races. Hispanic or Latino of any race were 1.0% of the population.

There were 361 households, of which 30.5% had children under the age of 18 living with them, 49.6% were married couples living together, 14.4% had a female householder with no husband present, 3.6% had a male householder with no wife present, and 32.4% were non-families. 27.7% of all households were made up of individuals, and 14.6% had someone living alone who was 65 years of age or older. The average household size was 2.38 and the average family size was 2.84.

The median age in the city was 39.7 years. 23.4% of residents were under the age of 18; 9.6% were between the ages of 18 and 24; 24.3% were from 25 to 44; 27% were from 45 to 64; and 15.8% were 65 years of age or older. The gender makeup of the city was 45.4% male and 54.6% female.

=== 2000 census ===
As of the census of 2000, there were 944 people, 382 households, and 260 families living in the city. The population density was 1,494.9 inhabitants per square mile (577.2/km^{2}). There were 407 housing units at an average density of 644.5 per square mile (248.8/km^{2}). The racial makeup of the city was 97.35% White, 0.53% African American, 0.64% Native American, 0.21% Asian, 0.42% from other races, and 0.85% from two or more races. Hispanic or Latino of any race were 0.42% of the population.

There were 382 households, out of which 31.7% had children under the age of 18 living with them, 52.6% were married couples living together, 9.7% had a female householder with no husband present, and 31.9% were non-families. 27.7% of all households were made up of individuals, and 16.2% had someone living alone who was 65 years of age or older. The average household size was 2.42 and the average family size was 2.91.

In the city the population was spread out, with 25.0% under the age of 18, 9.0% from 18 to 24, 28.5% from 25 to 44, 21.1% from 45 to 64, and 16.4% who were 65 years of age or older. The median age was 36 years. For every 100 females, there were 93.0 males. For every 100 females age 18 and over, there were 90.8 males.

The median income for a household in the city was $33,173, and the median income for a family was $44,196. Males had a median income of $30,074 versus $23,021 for females. The per capita income for the city was $15,830. About 3.5% of families and 8.6% of the population were below the poverty line, including 5.9% of those under age 18 and 16.8% of those age 65 or over.

== Education ==
It is in the Sturgeon R-V School District.
