= U.S. Route 40 in Missouri =

Section of transcontinental US highway

U.S. Route 40
- US 40 highlighted in red

Route information
- Maintained by MoDOT
- Existed: 1926–present

Major junctions
- West end: I-70 / US-24 / US-40 / US-169 in Kansas City
- I-35 in Kansas City; I-29 / I-35 / US 71 in Kansas City; I-70 in Kansas City; I-70 at Kansas City–Independence line; I-70 in Grain Valley; I-70 / I-70 BL / Route 5 in Boonville; I-70 / Route 240 near Rocheport; I-64 / I-70 / US 61 in Wentzville; I-44 / I-55 in St. Louis
- East end: I-55 / I-64 / US 40 in St. Louis

Location
- Country: United States
- State: Missouri
- Counties: Jackson, Lafayette, Saline, Cooper, Howard, Boone, Callaway, Montgomery, Warren, St. Charles, St. Louis, City of St. Louis

Highway system
- United States Numbered Highway System; List; Special; Divided; Missouri State Highway System; Interstate; US; State; Supplemental
← Route 39	→ Route 41

U.S. Route 40 (US 40) in the state of Missouri is a U.S. highway that runs from Kansas City to St. Louis. Outside of Greater St. Louis, much of the route either parallels or runs along I-70. East of Wentzville in Greater St. Louis, the route runs along I-64.

== Route description ==
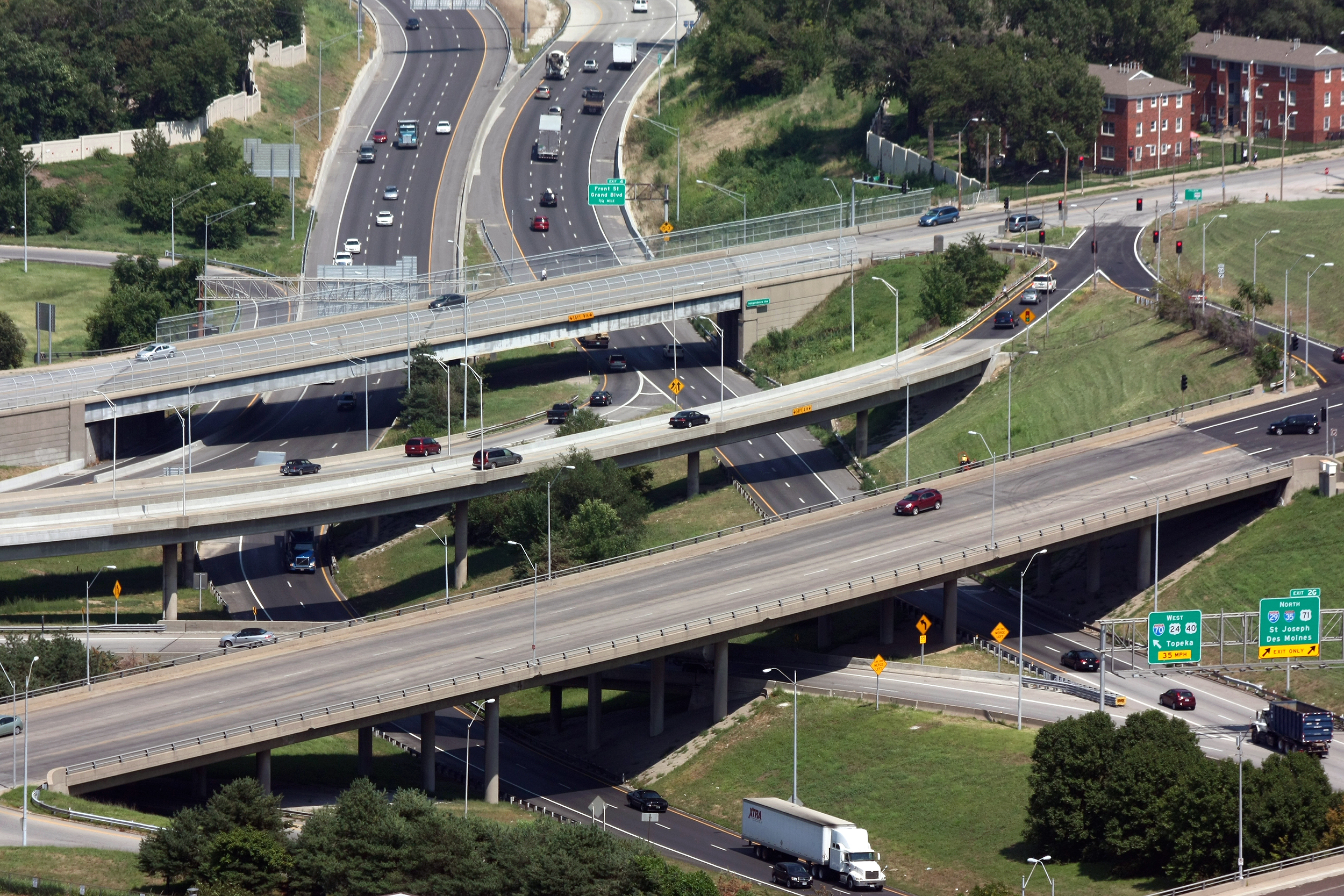
One of several interchanges on the Alphabet Loop, located northeast of downtown

US 40, along with I-70, US 24, and US 169, enters Kansas City via the Intercity Viaduct. US 169 exits the freeway north to the Buck O'Neil Bridge and I-35 joins with the remaining three routes. At the interchange with I-29 and US 71, I-70, US 24, and US 40 turn south while I-35 turns north. At I-670, I-70, US 24, and US 40 turn east while US 71 continues south toward I-49. In East Side, US 40 leaves I-70 before meeting I-435/US 24. Shortly after I-435, US 40 runs along or parallels the Kansas City–Independence line. Between I-470 and Blue Springs, the two roadways splits. At Grain Valley, US 40 rejoins I-70.

For 77 miles (124 km), US 40 runs along I-70 through rural areas, meeting US 65 at Marshall Junction as well as multiple state highways in different locations. US 40 eventually leaves the freeway to serve downtown Boonville, running concurrently with I-70 Bus. and Route 5 in the process. As the road approaches downtown, I-70 Bus. turns southeast while US 40 and Route 5 turns north, both running along Route 87. After leaving downtown and crossing above the Missouri River, Route 87 and then Route 5 leaves northward from US 40. US 40 parallels the Missouri River before reaching Rocheport; the route then parallels I-70. US 40 reenters the freeway just after Midway.

I-70/US 40 runs north of downtown Columbia. The freeway serves US 63 via a connector road, located east of the US 63 freeway.

US 40 continues to run along I-70 through rural areas between Columbia and Wentzville; the freeway, at one point, meets US 54 in Kingdom City. In Wentzville, at the Greater St. Louis area, US 40 leaves I-70 to enter I-64/US 61. US 40, along with I-64 and US 61, then crosses the Missouri River again, this time via the Daniel Boone Bridge. After crossing the river, the freeway serves the Spirit of St. Louis Airport in Chesterfield. At the Frontenac–Ladue line, US 61 leaves the freeway to enter south along US 67 (Lindbergh Boulevard). Next to the I-170 interchange in Richmond Heights, drivers can get on the Brentwood I-64 station on the Blue Line. Just after entering St. Louis proper, I-64/US 40 pares through the southern part of Forest Park. The freeway then becomes a double-decker twice: from Vandeventer Avenue to Compton Avenue and from 14th Street (near the Gateway Transportation Center) to an interchange with I-44/I-55. I-55 merges with I-64/US 40 near Gateway Arch. The freeway then crosses above the Mississippi River via the Poplar Street Bridge to enter Illinois.

== History ==
US 40 was formed in 1926. In Missouri, it ran from Kansas City to St. Louis roughly along its current alignment except in the St. Louis area. US 40 originally ran through St. Charles, but was rerouted southward closer to its current alignment in 1941.

=== Daniel Boone Expressway ===
The first section of present-day I-64/US 40 between Skinker Boulevard and Vandeventer Avenue opened in 1937. Originally called the Express Highway, it was then renamed to Red Feather Highway in 1948.

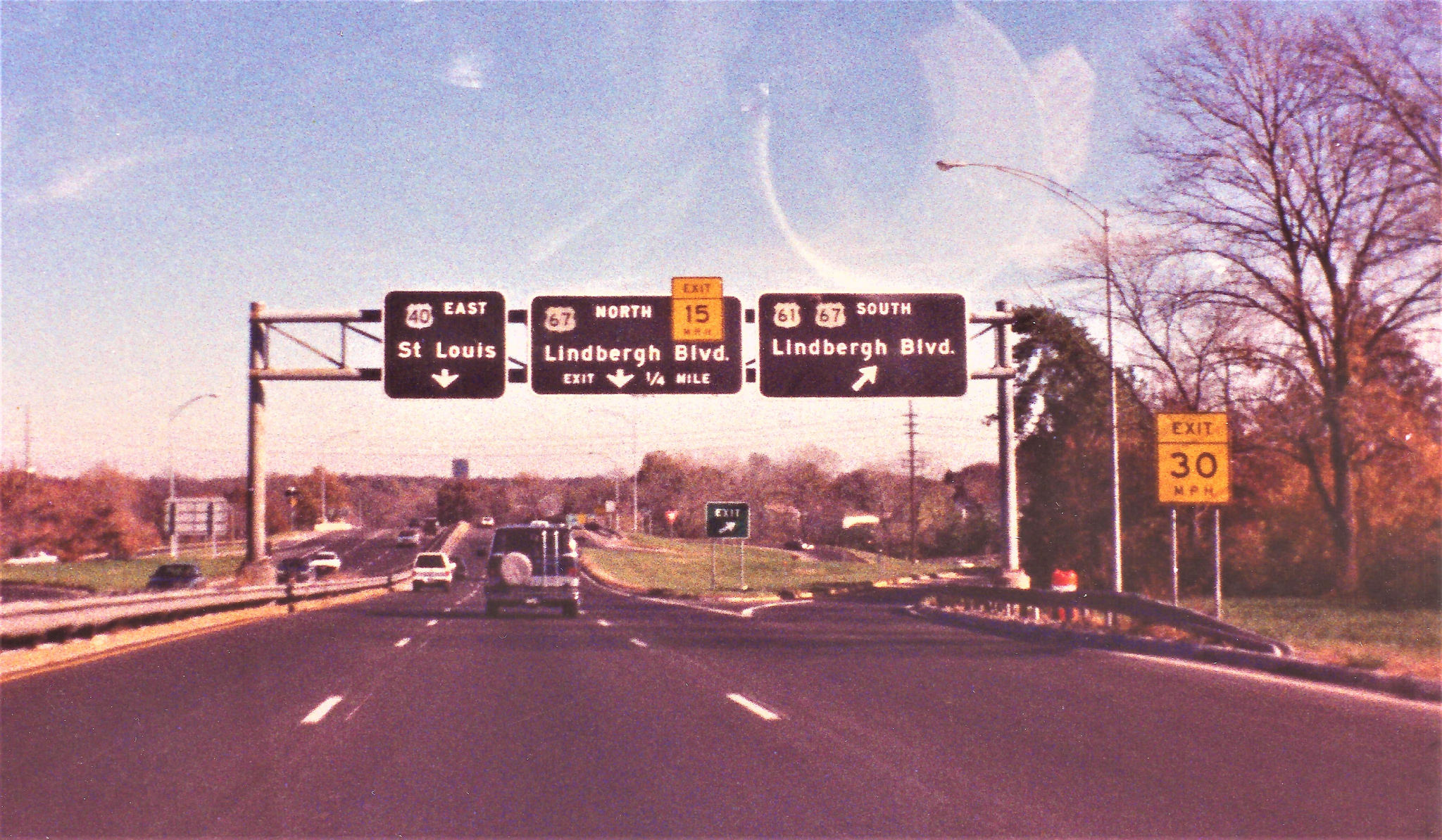
The expressway was originally not signed as an Interstate.

The Daniel Boone Expressway was established in 1938 from the Daniel Boone Bridge above the Missouri River to Lindbergh Boulevard. The expressway later extended eastward to Brentwood Boulevard in the 1940s. In 1959, the expressway was extended east from Brentwood to the Red Feather Highway, of which the latter highway became part of the Daniel Boone Expressway. In 1965, the expressway was extended to a pair of now-demolished connector ramps (part of a now-canceled expressway) east of Jefferson Avenue. The Poplar Street Bridge and the double-decker expressway east of 8th Street opened in 1967, which led to the realignment of US 40 from the Veterans Bridge to the newly-opened freeway bridge. The remaining double-decker section in downtown was finished by 1970.

In 1987, I-64 was extended west from the I-55/I-70/US 40 interchange in East St. Louis, Illinois, to I-270 in Town and Country via US 40 with a possibility of extending further west to I-70 in Wentzville via US 40/US 61. In the early 2000s, I-64 was extended west to Route 94. In the early 2010s, I-64 was extended to I-70 in Wentzville.

==== Reconstruction ====
The Daniel Boone Bridge originally had only one bridge carrying two lanes of traffic (one in each direction). In 1989, a second bridge was built to carry four lanes of eastbound traffic to accommodate an increasing amount of traffic attributed to population growth. The old bridge was reconfigured to serve three lanes of westbound traffic. However, due to the deterioration and the substandard lane configuration of the old bridge, a new bridge was built from 2013-2015 to the west of the 1989 bridge. The new bridge opened in 2015 for eastbound traffic, whereas the 1989 bridge reversed direction to serve westbound traffic. The 1937 bridge was demolished in 2016.

From 2007 to 2010, MoDOT reconstructed a portion of I-64/US 40 (dubbed "The New I-64" project) from Spoede Road to Kingshighway Boulevard.

== Major intersections ==
County	Location	mi	km	Exit	Destinations	Notes
Kansas River		0.000	0.000		I-70 west / US-24 west / US-40 west / US-169 south / Lewis and Clark Trail – Topeka	Continuation into Kansas
Kansas River		0.000	0.000	Lewis and Clark Viaduct; Kansas–Missouri line		
Jackson	Kansas City	0.886– 1.041	1.426– 1.675	2A	I-35 south – Wichita	Western end of I-35 / Downtown Loop concurrency
Jackson	Kansas City	0.845	1.360	2B	Beardsley Road	Eastbound exit and westbound entrance
Jackson	Kansas City	1.060	1.706	2C	US 169 north (Broadway Boulevard)	Eastern end of US 169 concurrency. Access to Charles B. Wheeler Downtown Airport and Downtown
Jackson	Kansas City	1.303	2.097	2D	Main Street / Delaware Street / Wyandotte Street	Signed as Main Street only eastbound
Jackson	Kansas City	1.651	2.657	2E	Route 9 north / Oak Street	Westbound access is via exit 2H
Jackson	Kansas City	1.853– 2.028	2.982– 3.264	2G	I-29 north / I-35 north / US 71 north / Lewis and Clark Trail – St. Joseph, Des Moines	Eastern end of I-35 concurrency; western end of US 71 concurrency; signed as exit 2G–H eastbound; southern terminus of I-29
Jackson	Kansas City	1.853– 2.028	2.982– 3.264	2H	To Route 9 north / Admiral Boulevard US 24 Bus. (Independence Avenue)	Westbound exit and eastbound entrance; Substitute exit for Exits 2F and 2E westbound
Jackson	Kansas City	2.273	3.658	2J	11th Street to 10th Street VIA Charlotte Street	Eastbound exit and westbound entrance; access to University of Missouri-Kansas City Medical School
Jackson	Kansas City	2.668	4.294	2K	12th Street / 11th Street to Charlotte Street / 10th Street / Harrison Street / Troost Avenue	Westbound exit and eastbound entrance
Jackson	Kansas City	2.375– 2.295	3.822– 3.693	2L	I-670 west to I-35 south – Wichita	I-670 exit 2N
Jackson	Kansas City	2.375– 2.295	3.822– 3.693	2M	US 71 south – Joplin	Eastern end of US 71 and Downtown Loop concurrency; I-670 exit 2N; westbound access is via exit 3A; eastern end of the Bruce Watkins Drive Memorial Parkway; access to UMKC Medical School, and Truman Medical Center-Hospital Hill
Jackson	Kansas City	2.375– 2.295	3.822– 3.693	2P	13th Street / Charlotte Street	Westbound exit only; access to Downtown Kansas City, UMKC Medical School, and Truman Medical Center-Hospital Hill
Jackson	Kansas City	2.375– 2.295	3.822– 3.693		14th Street / Charlotte Street	Eastbound entrance only
Jackson	Kansas City	2.375– 2.295	3.822– 3.693	2Q	Truman Road / Locust Street / Oak Street / Grand Boulevard / Walnut Street / Main Street / Baltimore Avenue	Westbound exit and eastbound entrance. Access to Power and Light District and T-Mobile Center.
Jackson	Kansas City	2.944	4.738	3A	To US 71 south / The Paseo	Westbound exit and entrance and eastbound entrance only. No eastbound exit from I-70 east; no westbound entrance to I-670 west; I-670 exit 3A; access to the American Jazz Museum and the Negro Leagues Baseball Museum
Jackson	Kansas City	3.389	5.454	3B	Brooklyn Avenue	Eastbound exit and westbound entrance
Jackson	Kansas City	3.644	5.864	3C	Prospect Avenue	Access to Pioneer College
Jackson	Kansas City	4.135	6.655	4A	Benton Boulevard / Truman Road	Eastbound exit and westbound entrance
Jackson	Kansas City	4.420	7.113	4B	17th Street	Access to American Jazz Museum and Negro Leagues Baseball Museum
Jackson	Kansas City	4.879	7.852	4C	22nd Street	
Jackson	Kansas City	5.447	8.766	5A	27th Street / Myrtle Avenue to Jackson Avenue	Eastbound exit and westbound entrance
Jackson	Kansas City	5.578	8.977		Myrtle Avenue to 31st Street	Former eastbound exit
Jackson	Kansas City	5.756	9.263	5B	Jackson Avenue / Myrtle Avenue to 27th Street	Westbound exit and eastbound entrance
Jackson	Kansas City	6.493	10.449	6	Van Brunt Boulevard	Access to Veteran Administration Medical Center
Jackson	Kansas City	7.053	11.351	–	I-70 east / US 24 east / 31st Street west – St. Louis	Eastern end of I-70/US 24 overlap
Jackson	Kansas City	8.713	14.022		I-435 north / US 24 east – Des Moines	
Jackson	Kansas City–Independence line	11.446	18.421		I-70	
Jackson	Independence	16.112	25.930		I-470 / Route 291 to I-70 – Lee's Summit, Liberty	
Jackson	Blue Springs	21.43	34.49		Route 7 to I-70 – Pleasant Hill	
Jackson	Grain Valley	25.67	41.31	–	I-70 west – Kansas City	Western end of I-70 overlap
Jackson	Oak Grove	29.426	47.357	28	Route F / Route H – Levasy, Oak Grove	
Lafayette	Bates City			31	Route D / Route Z – Bates City, Napoleon	
Lafayette	Odessa			37A	Action Road - Outlet Mall	Eastbound exit only
Lafayette	Odessa			37B	Route 131 – Odessa, Wellington	Signed as exit 37 westbound
Lafayette	Odessa			38	Johnson Drive	Westbound exit and eastbound entrance
Lafayette				41	Route M / Route O – Lexington, Mayview	
Lafayette				45	Route H – Mayview	
Lafayette	Higginsville			49	Route 13 – Higginsville, Warrensburg	Access to Wentworth Military Academy and Junior College, Missouri Veterans State Cemetery, Whiteman Air Force Base, the University of Central Missouri, Confederate Memorial State Historic Site, Battle of Lexington State Historic Site, and Maple Leaf Lake Conservation Area
Lafayette				52	Route T – Aullville	
Lafayette	Concordia			58	Route 23 – Concordia, Waverly, Knob Noster	
Saline	Emma			62	Route VV / Route Y – Emma	
Saline	Sweet Springs			66	Route 127 – Sweet Springs, Mt. Leonard	
Saline				71	Route EE / Route K – Houstonia	
Saline				74	Route YY	
Saline				78	US 65 – Sedalia, Marshall	Signed as exits 78A (south) and 78B (north)
Saline				84	Route J	
Cooper				89	Route K / Route M – Arrow Rock, Blackwater	
Cooper				98	Route 41 / Route 135 – Arrow Rock, Pilot Grove	
Cooper	Boonville			101	I-70 east – Columbia I-70 BL begins / Route 5 south (Ashley Road) – Tipton, Lake of the Ozarks	Eastern end of I-70 overlap; western end of I-70 BL/Route 5 overlap
Cooper	Boonville				I-70 BL east / Route 87 south (Main Street)	Western end of Route 87 overlap; eastern end of I-70 BL overlap
Missouri River				Boonslick Bridge		
Howard					Route 87 north – Glasgow, Boone's Lick State Historic Site	Eastern end of Route 87 concurrency
Howard					Route 5 north – New Franklin, Central Methodist University, Katy Trail State Park	Eastern end of Route 5 concurrency
Howard					Route 240 Alt. east – Fayette	
Howard					Route 240 west – Fayette, Central Methodist University	Western end of Route 240 concurrency
Howard					Route 240 Spur east – Rocheport	
Boone	Midway				I-70 west / Route 240 ends	Western end of I-70 concurrency; eastern terminus of Route 240
Boone	Columbia			124	Route E / Route 740 (Stadium Boulvard) – Columbia	Access to the University of Missouri, University Hospital, and Harry S. Truman Memorial Veterans' Hospital
Boone	Columbia			125	I-70 BL to West Boulevard	
Boone	Columbia			126	Route 163 (Providence Road)	Access to Downtown
Boone	Columbia			127	Route 763 (Range Line Road)	Access to Columbia College and Stephens College
Boone	Columbia			128	I-70 BL west – Columbia	Westbound exit only as of 2018; eastbound traffic onto I-70 rerouted to I-70 Connector
Boone	Columbia			128A	To US 63 – Jefferson City, Moberly	Indirect access via I-70 Connector; access to Columbia Regional Airport and the University of Missouri
Boone	Columbia			131	St. Charles Road / Lake of the Woods Road	
Boone				133	Route Z – Centralia	
Callaway				137	Route DD / Route J – Millersburg	Access to Little Dixie Lake Conservation Area
Callaway				144	Route HH / Route M – Hatton	
Callaway	Kingdom City			148	US 54 – Auxvasse, Mexico, Fulton	Access to the Lake of the Ozarks, Mark Twain Lake, and the National Churchill Museum
Callaway				155	Route A / Route Z – Bachelor, Calwood	
Callaway				161	Route D / Route YY – Williamsburg	Access to Whetstone Creek Conservation Area
Montgomery				170	Route 161 / Route J – Danville, Montgomery City	Access to Graham Cave State Park
Montgomery	New Florence			175	Route 19 – New Florence, Hermann	Access to Deutschheim State Historic Site and Mark Twain Lake
Montgomery	High Hill			179	Route F – High Hill	Access to Laborers-AGC Training Center
Montgomery	Jonesburg			183	Route E / Route NN / Route Y – Jonesburg	
Warren				188	Route A / Route B – Truxton	
Warren	Warrenton			192	Route MM / West Warrenton Boulevard	Roundabouts serve as access points to collector roads that direct to Route MM and Veterans Memorial Parkway; West Warrenton Boulevard serves as the overpass
Warren	Truesdale–Warrenton line			193	Route 47 – Warrenton, Hawk Point	
Warren	Wright City			199	Route H – Wright City	
Warren	Wright City			200	Route F / Route J / Route H – Wright City	Westbound exit and eastbound entrance; other half of interchange is via exit 199
St. Charles	Foristell			203	Route T / Route W – Foristell	
St. Charles	Wentzville			206	David Hoekel Parkway	
St. Charles	Wentzville			208	Wentzville Parkway	Access to SSM Health St. Joseph Hospital — Wentzville
St. Charles	Wentzville			209	Route Z / Church Street	
St. Charles	Wentzville				US 61 north (Avenue of the Saints) / I-64 begins / I-70 east – Hannibal, St. Louis	Eastern end of I-70 concurrency; western end of I-64/US 61 concurrency; western terminus of I-64
St. Charles	Lake St. Louis			1C	Prospect Road	
St. Charles	Lake St. Louis			2	Lake Saint Louis Boulevard	
St. Charles	Lake St. Louis			4A	Route N	To route N
St. Charles	Lake St. Louis			4B	Route 364 – Dardenne Prairie	Exits 1A-B on SR 364; cloverleaf interchange
St. Charles	O'Fallon			6	Route DD (Winghaven Boulevard)	
St. Charles	O'Fallon			9	Route K – O'Fallon	
St. Charles	Weldon Spring			10	Route 94 – St. Charles	Eastbound exit is via exit 9
St. Charles	Weldon Spring			11	Research Park Circle	No westbound entrance
Missouri River				Daniel Boone Bridge		
St. Louis	Chesterfield			14	Chesterfield Airport Road	Eastbound exit and westbound entrance
St. Louis	Chesterfield			14	Spirit of Saint Louis Boulevard	Westbound exit and eastbound entrance
St. Louis	Chesterfield			16	Long Road / Chesterfield Airport Road	Westbound exit and eastbound entrance
St. Louis	Chesterfield			17	Boone's Crossing	
St. Louis	Chesterfield			19A	Chesterfield Parkway West	
St. Louis	Chesterfield			19B	Route 340 (Olive Boulevard / Clarkson Road)	
St. Louis	Chesterfield			20	Chesterfield Parkway East	Westbound exit and eastbound entrance
St. Louis	Chesterfield			21	Timberlake Manor Parkway	
St. Louis	Town and Country			22	Route 141 (Woods Mill Road)	
St. Louis	Town and Country			23	Maryville Centre Drive	No eastbound exit
St. Louis	Town and Country			24	Mason Road	
St. Louis	Town and Country			25	I-270 – Chicago, Memphis	Exit 12 on I-270
St. Louis	Town and Country			26	Route JJ (Ballas Road)	Access to Mercy Hospital, Missouri Baptist Medical Center, and Covenant Seminary
St. Louis	Frontenac			27	Spoede Road	
St. Louis	Frontenac			28A	US 61 south / US 67 (Lindbergh Boulevard)	Eastern terminus of concurrency with US-61; national southern terminus of the Avenue of the Saints
St. Louis	Ladue			28B	Clayton Road	Westbound exit and eastbound entrance
St. Louis	Ladue			30	McKnight Road	
St. Louis	Richmond Heights			31A	I-170 north – Clayton	Exit 1 on I-170; southern terminus of I-170; access to Lambert–St. Louis Airport
St. Louis	Richmond Heights			31B	Brentwood Boulevard / Hanley Road	Roads connected via one way collector road
St. Louis	Richmond Heights			32	Laclede Station Road	Former westbound exit and eastbound entrance; removed 2007
St. Louis	Richmond Heights			33A	Big Bend Boulevard	
St. Louis	Richmond Heights			33B	Bellevue Avenue	Eastbound exit; westbound entrance via collector road connected to exit 33A
City of St. Louis				33C	McCausland Avenue	
City of St. Louis				34A	Clayton Road / Skinker Boulevard	Westbound exit and eastbound entrance
City of St. Louis				34B	Hampton Avenue	Eastbound slip ramp exit to Oakland Avenue eastbound; access to Forest Park and the Saint Louis Zoo
City of St. Louis				36A	Kingshighway Boulevard	Access to Barnes-Jewish Hospital, St. Louis Children's Hospital, Forest Park, the Missouri Botanical Garden, Ranken Technical College, the St. Louis Science Center, and St. Louis Community College
City of St. Louis				36B	Boyle Avenue / Tower Grove Avenue	Boyle Avenue only westbound
City of St. Louis				36C	Vandeventer Avenue	Eastbound exit and westbound entrance; access to the Missouri Botanical Garden
City of St. Louis				37A	Market Street / Bernard Street	Eastbound exit and westbound entrance
City of St. Louis				37B	Grand Boulevard	Eastbound exit and westbound entrance; access to Saint Louis University Hospital
City of St. Louis				38A	Forest Park Avenue / Grand Boulevard	Westbound exit and eastbound entrance; access to Forest Park, Chaifetz Arena and Washington University
City of St. Louis				38B	Chestnut Street at 20th Street / Market Street at 21st Street	Chestnut Street and 20th Street signed eastbound only; Market Street and 21st Street signed westbound only; portion of never-completed Missouri State Route 755; removed 2020 for construction of St. Louis City stadium
City of St. Louis				38C	Jefferson Avenue	Eastbound exit and westbound entrance
City of St. Louis				39A	22nd Street	access to St. Louis City stadium and St. Louis Union Station
City of St. Louis				39B	14th Street	Eastbound exit and westbound entrance; access to the Enterprise Center and the Stifel Theatre
City of St. Louis				39C	11th Street	Eastbound exit and westbound entrance; access to Busch Stadium
City of St. Louis				40B	6th Street	Eastbound exit and westbound entrance
City of St. Louis				40A	9th Street / Tucker Boulevard	Westbound exit only; access to Busch Stadium
City of St. Louis				40C	I-44 west / I-55 south – Memphis, Tulsa	Western terminus of concurrency with I-55; westbound exit and eastbound entrance
City of St. Louis				40	I-44 east to I-70 west / Walnut Street – Kansas City	Westbound exit and eastbound entrance; former I-70; access to St. Louis Lambert International Airport
Mississippi River				Poplar Street Bridge		
Mississippi River				–	I-55 north / I-64 east / US 40 east to I-70 east – Illinois	Continuation into Illinois
1.000 mi = 1.609 km; 1.000 km = 0.621 mi: Concurrency terminus; Incomplete access

== See also ==
- List of U.S. Highways in Missouri
