= Interstate 70 in Missouri =

Highway in Missouri

Interstate 70
- Dwight D. Eisenhower Highway
- I-70 highlighted in red

Route information
- Maintained by MoDOT
- Length: 250.16 mi (402.59 km)
- Existed: 1956–present
- NHS: Entire route

Major junctions
- West end: I-70 / US-24 / US-40 / US-169 at the Kansas state line in Kansas City
- I-29 / I-35 / US 71 in Kansas City; I-670 in Kansas City; I-435 / US 24 in Kansas City; I-470 / Route 291 in Independence; US 65 in Marshall Junction; I-64 / US 40 / US 61 in Wentzville; I-270 in Maryland Heights; I-170 in Berkeley; I-44 in St. Louis
- East end: I-70 at the Illinois state line in St. Louis

Location
- Country: United States
- State: Missouri
- Counties: Jackson, Lafayette, Saline, Cooper, Boone, Callaway, Montgomery, Warren, St. Charles, St. Louis, City of St. Louis

Highway system
- Interstate Highway System; Main; Auxiliary; Suffixed; Business; Future; Missouri State Highway System; Interstate; US; State; Supplemental
← US 69	→ US 71

Interstate 70 (I-70) in the US state of Missouri is generally parallel to the Missouri River. This section of the transcontinental interstate stretches from the Kansas state line on the Lewis and Clark Viaduct, running concurrently with U.S. Route 24 (US 24), US 40 and US 169, to the east end on the Stan Musial Veterans Memorial Bridge in St. Louis.

== Route description ==
Crossing into Missouri from Kansas, I-70 immediately encounters the Downtown Loop, a four-mile (6.4 km) loop of freeways whose 24 exits are designated with the number 2 and a letter suffix. Also called the Alphabet Loop, its exits use the entire alphabet except I and O. Entering the loop, I-70 runs concurrently with I-35 until they approach the northeastern corner of the loop. Back at the northwest corner, US 169 splits off to the north, leaving four concurrent routes. In the large interchange with Route 9 at the loop's northeastern corner, I-29 ends and US 71 joins.

Once it leaves I-35, I-70 turns south, with interchanges to more roads. At the southeastern corner, I-70, US 40, US 24, and US 71 all exit the loop. I-70, US 40, and US 24 split off to the east, and US 71 continues south. I-670 ends at the alignment. Soon afterward, I-70/US 40/US 24 turn southeast. US 40 leaves I-70 at exit 7A. I-70 and US 24 then interchanges with I-435, the beltway around the Kansas City metropolitan area. US 24 leaves I-70 at exit 8B and heads north following I-435.

Within Kansas City, I-70 is known as the George Brett Super Highway, named after George Brett, the Kansas City Royals’ all-time hits, home runs and runs batted in (RBI) leader, former third baseman and first baseman, and National Baseball Hall of Fame inductee. The Truman Sports Complex, named for Harry Truman, houses the Royals' and Kansas City Chiefs' stadiums and is located next to the I-70/I-435 interchange.

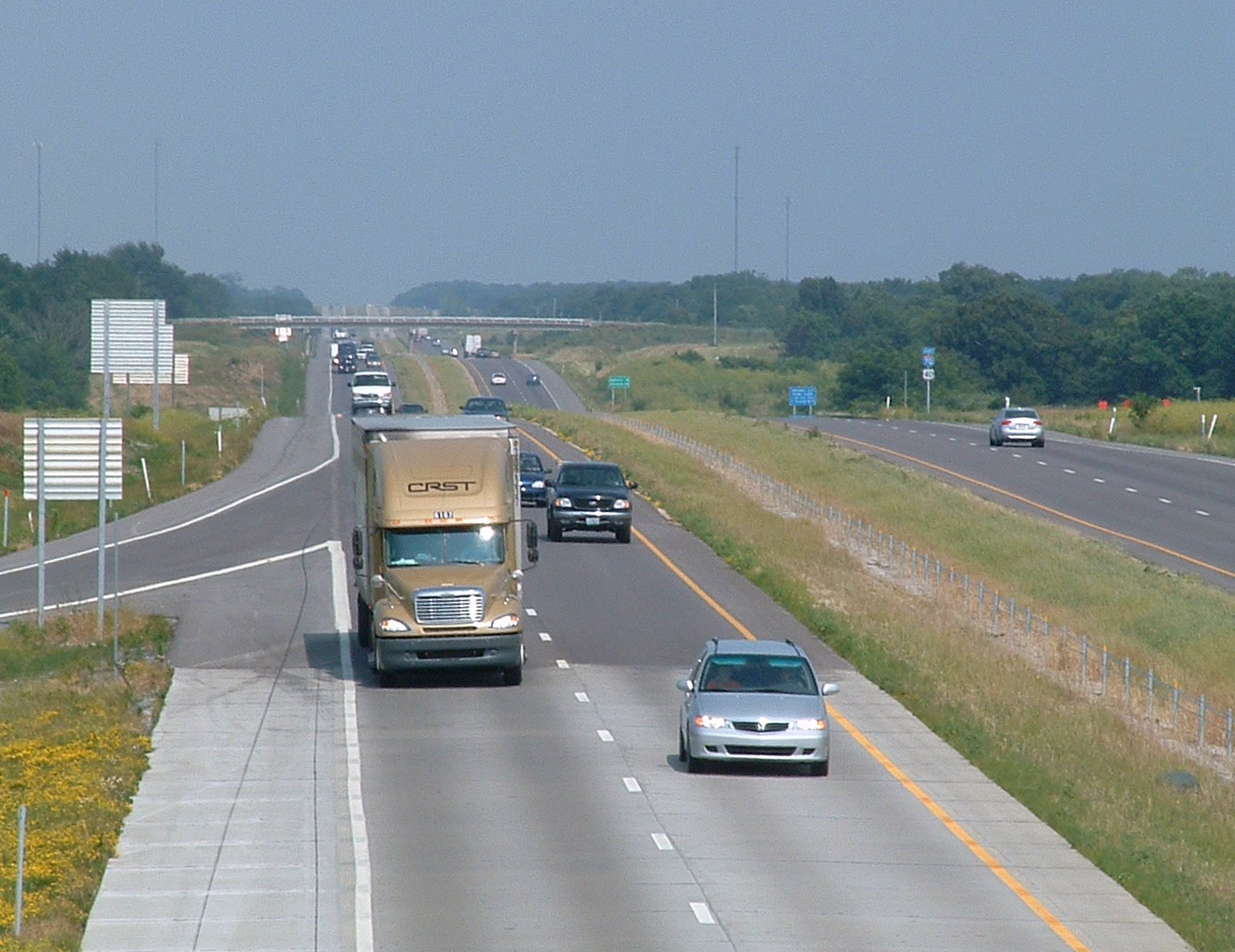
I-70 in Saline County

East of I-435, I-70 continues east through Independence, the Kansas City Metro Area's largest suburb by both population and area on the Missouri side, passing a busy cloverleaf interchange at I-470. The highway then continues with six lanes to the rapidly growing suburb of Blue Springs, where the roadway narrows to four lanes (two each direction) at Route 7. I-70 remains at this width until just west of the intersection with I-64/US 40/US 61 in Wentzville, over 170 miles (270 km) away.

East of Blue Springs, I-70 takes on a rural highway as it leaves Jackson County. The highway remains this way for the next 100 miles (160 km), going through gently rolling terrain while it meets US 65 at a cloverleaf interchange and finally crossing the Missouri River at Rocheport just west of where it reaches the midsized college town of Columbia in the center of the state. Through Columbia, the highway is lined with restaurants and hotels and can get congested during University of Missouri sporting events. The highway leaves Columbia after an exit with St. Charles Road on the east end of town. East of Columbia, I-70 has an interchange with US 54 at Kingdom City, Route 19 at New Florence, and Route 47 at Warrenton. Then, it continues through more gently rolling terrain until it reaches Wentzville, where it meets I-64/US 61. Here, US 40 departs from I-70. It then expands to three lanes each direction to St. Louis.

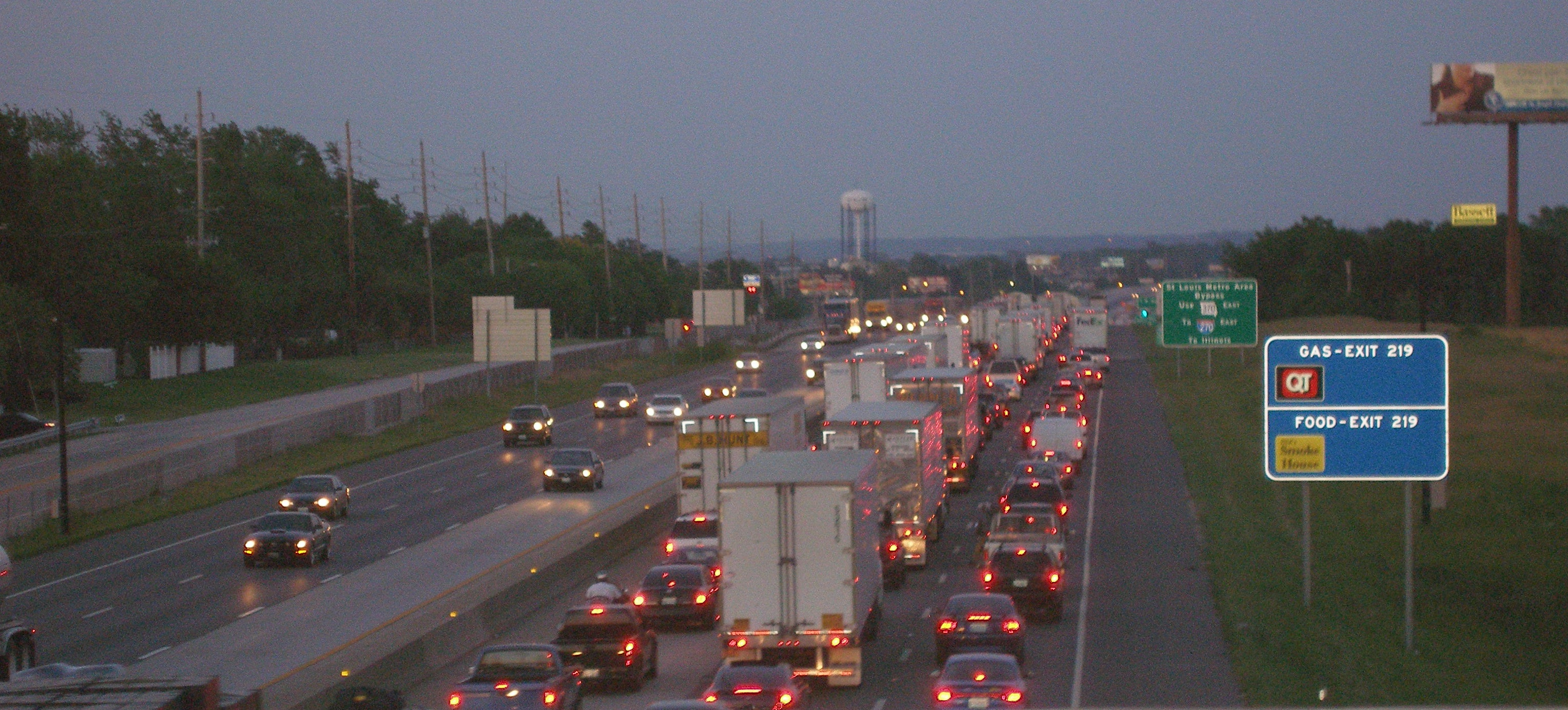
I-70 west of St. Louis; shown here is rush-hour traffic congestion. Since this photograph was taken, this section has been widened to four lanes in each direction.

East of Wentzville, I-70 passes through the bedroom community of Lake St. Louis, then the growing towns of O'Fallon and St. Peters, and finally the historic city of St. Charles. It crosses over the Missouri River one last time on the Blanchette Memorial Bridge, which is actually made up of two bridges: the westbound span built in the late 1950s and refurbished in 2013 and the eastbound one completed in the late 1970s.

Traffic volume increases as I-70 enters St. Louis County, growing to 13 lanes. The section of I-70 from Fifth Street in St. Charles to I-270 is among the busiest section of highway in the state, with annual average daily traffic (AADT) near 165,000 in 2005.

I-270 draws much of the traffic, so I-70 continues east through Bridgeton with only six lanes. After interchanges with Route 180 (St. Charles Rock Road) and US 67 (Lindbergh Boulevard), it passes on the southern edge of St. Louis Lambert International Airport and through several bedroom communities—including Edmundson, Berkeley, Ferguson, and Jennings—and crossing I-170 in the process.

As it finally enters the city of St. Louis, motorists encounter what are signed as the "Express Lanes", known by the Missouri Department of Transportation (MoDOT) as the "reversible lanes". Two lanes in the middle of the freeway are separated from the eastbound and westbound lanes by Jersey barriers. MoDOT regularly monitors traffic patterns of this stretch of I-70 and will adjust the express lane traffic patterns accordingly. These lanes have no entrance or exit ramps, except at the ends. They extend approximately eight miles (13 km) from near Union Boulevard to just north of Downtown St. Louis.

Just before it enters downtown, I-70 turns to the east to cross the Stan Musial Veterans Memorial Bridge, which redirects the highway's traffic away from the congested Poplar Street Bridge two miles (3.2 km) to the south. This two-mile (3.2 km) stretch of former I-70 is now an extension of I-44.

== History ==
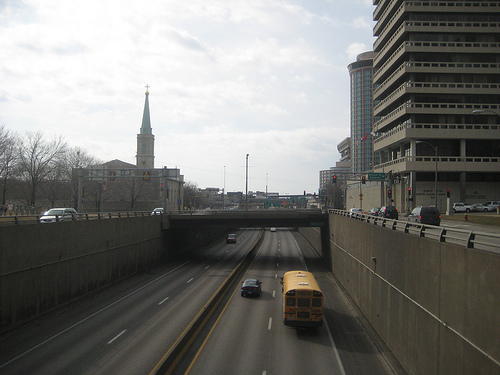
Before 2014, I-70 traveled through downtown St. Louis near the Gateway Arch. Now, this section is signed as I-44.

I-70 had been criticized for cutting off downtown from the Mississippi River waterfront particularly at the Gateway Arch. St. Louis constructed a $90-million (equivalent to $131 million in 2024) project to cover the highway (now I-44) by the arch.

This was not the first controversy involving I-70 and the arch. In 1959, builders of the Poplar Street Bridge asked for the National Park Service to give 25 acres (10 ha) of the park for the bridge. The request generated enormous controversy and ultimately 2.5 acres (1.0 ha) was turned over to use for the bridge.

The New Mississippi River Bridge was finished and opened to traffic on Sunday, February 9, 2014. It reroutes and redirects I-70 traffic off the congested Poplar Street Bridge. The bridge was named in honor of St. Louis Cardinals baseball legend Stan Musial.

As of 2021, US 24 follows I-70 east to I-435 north. US 24 that used to follow Independence Avenue will become a business route of US 24.

The Missouri Hyperloop was a proposed high-speed transportation route that would complement and relieve I-70.

MoDOT plans to replace the Rocheport Bridge, which crosses the Missouri River near Rocheport, with two bridges. Originally, one bridge carries four lanes of I-70. Construction of one new span began in 2021 and was completed in July 2023 and the span was imploded 2 months later. A new span was completed in December 2024.

I-70 across central Missouri is one of the oldest stretches of Interstate Highway; some sections date to the late 1950s. Some exits have short, substandard acceleration and deceleration ramps and the median is relatively narrow. In certain spots, eastward and westward traffic is separated by no more than a Jersey barrier. Some overpasses have low clearance, especially railway overpasses. Long-term plans call to expand the highway to between six and eight lanes across the middle of the state. Tolling the Interstate has become a possible alternative, although the public does not support this idea.

In May 2023, about $2.8 billion was allocated to widen the interstate to at least three lanes in each direction. In July 2023, Governor Mike Parson approved the proposal. Dubbed the MODOT's "Improve I-70" program, the project will be executed in six segments and begin construction work in spring 2024; the work is expected to last about seven years.

A March 2010 study of I-70 from the Kansas state line to the I-470 interchange identified possible improvements, including expanding the freeway from four to eight lanes, adding high-occupancy vehicle or toll lanes, reconstructing the Truman Road interchange, and improving the curves at Jackson Avenue and Truman Road. Some ideas included a new alignment of I-70 as a tunnel from the southeast corner of the downtown loop to 22nd/23rd streets, covering the southern portion of the downtown loop (I-670), or making the downtown loop into a unidirectional freeway around downtown, essentially becoming a large roundabout.

== Exit list ==
County	Location	mi	km	Exit	Destinations	Notes
Kansas River		0.000	0.000		I-70 west / US-24 west / US-40 west / US-169 south / Lewis and Clark Trail – Topeka	Continuation into Kansas
Kansas River		0.000	0.000	Lewis and Clark Viaduct; Kansas–Missouri line		
Jackson	Kansas City	0.886– 1.041	1.426– 1.675	2A	I-35 south – Wichita	Western end of I-35/Downtown freeway loop concurrency
Jackson	Kansas City	0.845	1.360	2B	Beardsley Road	Eastbound exit and westbound entrance
Jackson	Kansas City	1.060	1.706	2C	US 169 north (Broadway Boulevard)	Eastern end of US 169 concurrency; access to Charles B. Wheeler Downtown Airport and Downtown
Jackson	Kansas City	1.303	2.097	2D	Main Street; Delaware Street; Wyandotte Street	Signed as Main Street only eastbound
Jackson	Kansas City	1.651	2.657	2E	Route 9 north / Oak Street	Westbound access is via exit 2H
Jackson	Kansas City	1.853– 2.028	2.982– 3.264	2G	I-29 north / I-35 north / US 71 north / Lewis and Clark Trail – St. Joseph, Des Moines	Eastern end of I-35 concurrency; western end of US 71 concurrency; signed as exit 2G–H eastbound; southern terminus of I-29
Jackson	Kansas City	1.853– 2.028	2.982– 3.264	2H	To Route 9 north / Admiral Boulevard US 24 Bus. (Independence Avenue)	Westbound exit and eastbound entrance; substitute exit for exits 2F and 2E westbound
Jackson	Kansas City	2.273	3.658	2J	11th Street to 10th Street via Charlotte Street	Eastbound exit and westbound entrance; access to University of Missouri-Kansas City Medical School
Jackson	Kansas City	2.668	4.294	2K	12th Street; 11th Street to Charlotte Street; 10th Street; Harrison Street; Troost Avenue	Westbound exit and eastbound entrance
Jackson	Kansas City	2.375– 2.295	3.822– 3.693	2L	I-670 west to I-35 south – Wichita	I-670 exit 2N
Jackson	Kansas City	2.375– 2.295	3.822– 3.693	2M	US 71 south – Joplin	Eastern end of US 71 and Downtown freeway loop concurrency; I-670 exit 2N; westbound access is via exit 3A; eastern end of the Bruce Watkins Drive Memorial Parkway; access to UMKC Medical School, and Truman Medical Center-Hospital Hill
Jackson	Kansas City	2.375– 2.295	3.822– 3.693	2P	13th Street, Charlotte Street – Downtown	Westbound exit only; access to UMKC Medical School and Truman Medical Center-Hospital Hill
Jackson	Kansas City	2.375– 2.295	3.822– 3.693		14th Street; Charlotte Street	Eastbound entrance only
Jackson	Kansas City	2.375– 2.295	3.822– 3.693	2Q	Truman Road; Locust Street; Oak Street; Grand Boulevard; Walnut Street; Main Street; Baltimore Avenue	Westbound exit and eastbound entrance; access to Power and Light District and T-Mobile Center
Jackson	Kansas City	2.944	4.738	3A	To US 71 south / The Paseo	Westbound exit and entrance and eastbound entrance only. No eastbound exit from I-70 east; no westbound entrance to I-670 west; I-670 exit 3A; access to the American Jazz Museum and the Negro Leagues Baseball Museum
Jackson	Kansas City	3.389	5.454	3B	Brooklyn Avenue	Eastbound exit and westbound entrance; Signed as exit 3B on eastbound only
Jackson	Kansas City	3.644	5.864	3C	Prospect Avenue	Signed as exit 3B on westbound only; access to Pioneer College
Jackson	Kansas City	4.135	6.655	4A	Benton Boulevard; Truman Road	Eastbound exit and westbound entrance; Signed as exit 4A on eastbound only
Jackson	Kansas City	4.420	7.113	4B	18th Street	Signed as exit 4A on westbound only; Access to American Jazz Museum and Negro Leagues Baseball Museum
Jackson	Kansas City	4.879	7.852	4C	23rd Street	Signed as 4B on westbound only; formerly signed as 4C on westbound only
Jackson	Kansas City	5.447	8.766	5A	27th Street; Myrtle Avenue to Jackson Avenue	Eastbound exit and westbound entrance; Signed as exit 5A on eastbound only
Jackson	Kansas City	5.578	8.977		Myrtle Avenue to 31st Street	Former eastbound exit
Jackson	Kansas City	5.756	9.263	5B	Jackson Avenue; Myrtle Avenue to 27th Street	Westbound exit and eastbound entrance; Signed as exit 5 on westbound only
Jackson	Kansas City	6.493	10.449	6	Van Brunt Boulevard	Access to Veteran Administration Medical Center
Jackson	Kansas City	7.053	11.351	7A	US 40 east / 31st Street	Eastern end of US 40 overlap
Jackson	Kansas City	7.675	12.352	7B	Manchester Trafficway	
Jackson	Kansas City	8.078– 9.105	13.000– 14.653	8	I-435 south / Blue Ridge Cutoff – Wichita, Truman Sports Complex US 24 east / I-435 north – Des Moines	I-435 exit 63A; signed as exits 8A (south) and 8B (north)
Jackson	Kansas City	9.338	15.028	9	Blue Ridge Cutoff –Truman Sports Complex	Westbound exit and eastbound and westbound entrance; eastbound exit 9 via exit 8A
Jackson	Kansas City	10.848	17.458	10	Sterling Avenue	Eastbound exit only; westbound entrance to I-70 is via US 40; westbound exit and eastbound entrance via US 40 and I-70
Jackson	Kansas City–Independence line	11.101– 11.122	17.865– 17.899	11	US 40 / Blue Ridge Boulevard	Blue Ridge Boulevard only has eastbound and westbound entrances; except for a ramp to southbound Blue Ridge Boulevard from US 40 eastbound
Jackson	Independence	12.596	20.271	12	Noland Road	Access to the Harry S. Truman Presidential Library and Museum and Harry S. Truman National Historic Site
Jackson	Independence	14.093	22.680	14	Lee's Summit Road	
Jackson	Independence	15.090– 15.776	24.285– 25.389	15	I-470 south / Route 291 – Lee's Summit, Liberty	I-470 exits 16B–C; signed as exits 15A (south/west) and 15B (north); access to Sugar Creek
Jackson	Independence	16.613	26.736	17	Little Blue Parkway, 39th Street, Mall Entrance	Access to Centerpoint Medical Center and Independence Event Center
Jackson	Blue Springs	18.563	29.874	18	Woods Chapel Road	Access to Lake Tapawingo and Fleming Park
Jackson	Blue Springs	20.392	32.818	20	Route 7 – Blue Springs	Access to Lake Lotawana
Jackson	Blue Springs	21.625	34.802	21	Adams Dairy Parkway – Blue Springs	
Jackson	Grain Valley	24.412	39.287	24	US 40 / Route AA / Route BB – Grain Valley, Buckner	Western end of US 40 concurrency
Jackson	Oak Grove	28.169	45.334	28	Route F / Route H – Levasy, Oak Grove	
Lafayette	Bates City	31.431	50.583	31	Route D / Route Z – Bates City, Napoleon	
Lafayette	Odessa	36.665	59.007	37A	Action Road - Outlet Mall	Eastbound exit only; access to Shops at Odessa; attached to exit 37B
Lafayette	Odessa	36.989	59.528	37B	Route 131 – Odessa, Wellington	No eastbound entrance—eastbound entrance is via exit 38; signed as exit 37 westbound
Lafayette	Odessa	38.252	61.561	38	Johnson Drive	Westbound exit and eastbound entrance
Lafayette		41.173	66.262	41	Route M / Route O – Lexington, Mayview	
Lafayette		45.382	73.035	45	Route H – Mayview	
Lafayette	Higginsville	49.387	79.481	49	Route 13 – Higginsville, Warrensburg	Access to Wentworth Military Academy and Junior College, Missouri Veterans State Cemetery, Whiteman Air Force Base, the University of Central Missouri, Confederate Memorial State Historic Site, Battle of Lexington State Historic Site, and Maple Leaf Lake Conservation Area
Lafayette		52.839	85.036	52	Route T – Aullville	
Lafayette	Concordia	58.569	94.258	58	Route 23 – Concordia, Waverly, Knob Noster	
Saline	Emma	62.574	100.703	62	Route VV / Route Y – Emma	
Saline	Sweet Springs	66.891	107.651	66	Route 127 – Sweet Springs, Mt. Leonard	
Saline		71.383	114.880	71	Route EE / Route K – Houstonia	
Saline		74.606	120.067	74	Route YY	
Saline		78.173	125.807	78	US 65 – Sedalia, Marshall	Signed as exits 78A (south) and 78B (north)
Saline		84.614	136.173	84	Route J	
Cooper		89.918	144.709	89	Route K / Route M – Arrow Rock, Blackwater	
Cooper		98.000	157.716	98	Route 41 / Route 135 – Arrow Rock, Pilot Grove	
Cooper	Boonville	101.781	163.801	101	I-70 BL / US 40 / Route 5 (Ashley Road) – Boonville, Tipton	Eastern end of US 40 concurrency; access to Central Methodist University and Lake of the Ozarks
Cooper	Boonville	103.551	166.649	103	Route B (Main Street) – Boonville, Bunceton	Access to Historic Downtown Boonville and Katy Trail State Park
Cooper	Windsor Place	106.382	171.205	106	I-70 BL / Route 87 (Bingham Road) – Boonville, Prairie Home	
Cooper		111.455	179.369	111	Route 98 / Route 179 – Overton, Wooldridge	
Missouri River		114.714	184.614	Rocheport Interstate 70 Bridge		
Boone		115.505	185.887	115	Route BB – Rocheport	Access to Katy Trail State Park and Historic Downtown Rocheport
Boone		117.687	189.399	117	Route J / Route O – Huntsdale, Harrisburg	
Boone		121.178	195.017	121	US 40 west / Route 240 / Route UU – Fayette	Western end of US 40 concurrency; access to Central Methodist University and UMC Dairy Farm
Boone	Columbia	124.398	200.199	124	Route E / Route 740 (Stadium Boulevard) – Columbia	Access to the University of Missouri, University Hospital, and Harry S. Truman Memorial Veterans' Hospital
Boone	Columbia	125.543	202.042	125	I-70 BL to West Boulevard	
Boone	Columbia	126.545	203.654	126	Route 163 (Providence Road) – Downtown	
Boone	Columbia	127.019	204.417	127	Route 763 (Range Line Road)	Access to Columbia College and Stephens College
Boone	Columbia	128.287	206.458	128	I-70 BL west – Columbia	Former westbound left exit and eastbound entrance. Both movements are now re-routed to Exit 128A.
Boone	Columbia	128.887	207.424	128A	To US 63 – Jefferson City, Moberly	Indirect access via I-70 Connector; access to Columbia Regional Airport and the University of Missouri; Signed as exit 128 eastbound
Boone	Columbia	130.984	210.798	131	St. Charles Road; Lake of the Woods Road	
Boone		133.644	215.079	133	Route Z – Centralia	
Callaway		137.729	221.653	137	Route DD / Route J – Millersburg	Access to Little Dixie Lake Conservation Area
Callaway		144.193	232.056	144	Route HH / Route M – Hatton	
Callaway	Kingdom City	147.963	238.123	148	US 54 – Auxvasse, Mexico, Fulton	Access to the Lake of the Ozarks, Mark Twain Lake, and the National Churchill Museum; future Diverging Diamond Interchange (DDI)
Callaway		155.426	250.134	155	Route A / Route Z – Bachelor, Calwood	
Callaway		161.318	259.616	161	Route D / Route YY – Williamsburg	Access to Whetstone Creek Conservation Area
Montgomery		170.374	274.190	170	Route 161 / Route J – Danville, Montgomery City	Access to Graham Cave State Park
Montgomery	New Florence	174.975	281.595	175	Route 19 – New Florence, Hermann	Access to Deutschheim State Historic Site and Mark Twain Lake
Montgomery	High Hill	179.797	289.355	179	Route F – High Hill	Access to Laborers-AGC Training Center
Montgomery	Jonesburg	183.780	295.765	183	Route E / Route NN / Route Y – Jonesburg	
Warren		188.445	303.273	188	Route A / Route B – Truxton	
Warren	Warrenton	192.121	309.189	192	Route MM / West Warrenton Boulevard	Roundabouts serve as access points to collector roads that direct to Route MM and Veterans Memorial Parkway; West Warrenton Boulevard serves as the overpass
Warren	Truesdale–Warrenton line	193.484	311.382	193	Route 47 – Warrenton, Hawk Point	
Warren	Wright City	198.962	320.198	199	Route H – Wright City	
Warren	Wright City	200.000	321.869	200	Route F / Route J / Route H – Wright City	Westbound exit and eastbound entrance; other half of interchange is via exit 199
St. Charles	Foristell	203.750	327.904	203	Route T / Route W – Foristell	
St. Charles	Wentzville	206.586	332.468	206	David Hoekel Parkway	
St. Charles	Wentzville	208.231	335.115	208	Wentzville Parkway	Access to SSM Health St. Joseph Hospital — Wentzville
St. Charles	Wentzville	209.412	337.016	209	Route Z / Church Street	
St. Charles	Wentzville	210.090– 211.002	338.107– 339.575	210	US 61 (Avenue of the Saints) / I-64 east / US 40 east – Chesterfield, Hannibal	Eastern end of US 40 concurrency; signed as exits 210A (east/south) and 210B (north); I-64 exit 1; western terminus of I-64
St. Charles	Lake St. Louis	211.948	341.097	212	Route A	Access to Midwest University
St. Charles	Lake St. Louis	213.950	344.319	214	Lake St. Louis Boulevard	Access to SSM Health St. Joseph Hospital-Lake St. Louis
St. Charles	O'Fallon	215.977	347.581	216	Bryan Road	
St. Charles	O'Fallon	217.759	350.449	217	Route K (Main Street) – O'Fallon	Eastbound exit and westbound entrance; westbound exit and eastbound entrance via frontage roads and exit 218
St. Charles	O'Fallon	218.433	351.534	218	T.R. Hughes Boulevard; Belleau Creek Road; Route K (Main Street) – O'Fallon	T.R. Hughes Boulevard and Belleau Creek Road signed eastbound only; Route K and Main Street signed westbound only
St. Charles	O'Fallon	218.929	352.332	219	T.R. Hughes Boulevard; Belleau Creek Road	Westbound exit and eastbound entrance; eastbound exit and westbound entrance via frontage roads and exit 218
St. Charles	St. Peters	220.381	354.669	220	Route 79 – Elsberry, Louisiana	
St. Charles	St. Peters	222.098	357.432	222A	Mid Rivers Mall Drive	
St. Charles	St. Peters	222.262	357.696	222B	Veterans Memorial Parkway; Suemandy Drive	Eastbound exit only
St. Charles	St. Peters	223.365– 223.945	359.471– 360.405	224	Route 370 east	Route 370 exit 0
St. Charles	St. Peters	225.129	362.310	225	Cave Springs Road, Harry S Truman Road	Access to Barnes Jewish Hospital-St. Peters
St. Charles	St. Charles	226.933	365.213	227	Zumbehl Road	
St. Charles	St. Charles	228.277	367.376	228	I-70 BL / Route 94 / Lewis and Clark Trail (First Capitol Drive) – St. Charles, Weldon Spring	Access to Lindenwood University and SSM Health St. Joseph Hospital-St. Charles
St. Charles	St. Charles	229.143	368.770	229A	Convention Center Boulevard	No eastbound entrance
St. Charles	St. Charles	229.379	369.150	229B	I-70 BL (Fifth Street)	Access to First Missouri State Capitol State Historic Site, Katy Trail State Park, and SSM Health St. Joseph Hospital-St. Charles
Missouri River		230.128	370.355	Blanchette Memorial Bridge		
St. Louis	Maryland Heights	231.507	372.574	231A	Route 141 south (Maryland Heights Expressway)	Access to Hollywood Casino Amphitheater
St. Louis	Maryland Heights	231.507	372.574	231B	Route 141 north (Earth City Expressway)	Access to Hollywood Casino Amphitheater
St. Louis	Maryland Heights–Bridgeton line	232.222– 233.024	373.725– 375.016	232	I-270 – Chicago, Memphis	I-270 exit 20; signed as exits 232A (south) and 232B (north) westbound
St. Louis	Bridgeton	234.180	376.876	234	Route 180 (St. Charles Rock Road)	SSM Health DePaul Hospital-St. Louis
St. Louis	Bridgeton	235.096	378.350	235	US 67 (Lindbergh Boulevard)	Signed as exits 235A (south) and 235B (north)
St. Louis	Bridgeton	235.626	379.203	235C	Route B (Natural Bridge Road) / Cypress Road	Access to St. Louis Lambert International Airport
St. Louis	Edmundson	236.729	380.978	236	Pear Tree Drive; Natural Bridge Road; Airflight Drive; Lambert International Boulevard	Access to St. Louis Lambert International Airport
St. Louis	Berkeley	237.627	382.424	237	Route 115 east (Natural Bridge Road)	No westbound exit
St. Louis	Berkeley	238.068	383.133	238A	Lambert-St. Louis International Airport	Westbound exit and eastbound entrance
St. Louis	Berkeley	238.430– 239.066	383.716– 384.739	238	I-170 – Clayton	Signed as exits 238B (south) and 238C (north); I-170 exit 7
St. Louis	Berkeley	239.783	385.893	239	Hanley Road	Westbound exit is via exit 240; access to Vatterott College
St. Louis	Cool Valley	240.393	386.875	240	Route N (Florissant Road, University Boulevard); North Hanley Road	North Hanley Road not signed eastbound; access to Historic Downtown Ferguson and the University of Missouri-St. Louis
St. Louis	Normandy	240.920	387.723	241A	Bermuda Road	
St. Louis	Northwoods–Norwood Court line	241.691	388.964	241B	Route U (Lucas & Hunt Road)	
St. Louis	Pine Lawn	242.774	390.707	242	Jennings Station Road	
City of St. Louis		243.09	391.22	243A	Goodfellow Boulevard	Eastbound access via exit 242
City of St. Louis		243.345	391.626	243B	Route 367 north (Riverview Boulevard)	Westbound exit only
City of St. Louis		244.062	392.780	243C	Bircher Boulevard	Eastbound exit only
City of St. Louis		244.255	393.090	244A	Union Boulevard; Kingshighway	Access to Ranken Technical College
City of St. Louis				—	I-70 Express Lanes – Downtown	Eastbound exit only; westbound entrance closed in 2009; western end of express lanes
City of St. Louis		244.579	393.612	244B	Kingshighway Boulevard	Westbound exit and eastbound entrance; eastbound access via exit 244A
City of St. Louis		245.013	394.310	245A	Shreve Avenue	
City of St. Louis		245.643	395.324	245B	W. Florissant Avenue	
City of St. Louis		246.111	396.077	246A	Carrie Avenue	Formerly signed as N. Broadway and O'Fallon Park
City of St. Louis		246.622	396.900	246B	Adelaide Avenue	
City of St. Louis		247.218	397.859	247	Grand Boulevard	
City of St. Louis		248.068	399.227	248A	Route 115 west (Salisbury Street) – McKinley Bridge	Access to IL 3
City of St. Louis		248.515	399.946	248B	Branch Street	Westbound exit only
City of St. Louis		248.755	400.332	248C	St. Louis Avenue	Eastbound exit and entrance; access to Municipal River Terminal
City of St. Louis		249.274	401.168	249A	I-44 west to I-55 south – Tulsa, Memphis	Eastbound exit and Westbound entrance; eastern terminus of I-44; former routing of I-70
City of St. Louis		249.335	401.266	249B	Tucker Boulevard – Downtown	Signed as exit 249 westbound; no westbound entrance
City of St. Louis		249.840	402.079	292B	Broadway	Eastbound exit only for Express Lanes; exit number based on I-44 mileage
City of St. Louis					I-44 west to I-55 south – Tulsa, Memphis	Eastern end of Express Lanes; eastbound exit only for Express Lanes
Mississippi River		250.063	402.437	Stan Musial Veterans Memorial Bridge; Missouri–Illinois line		
Mississippi River		250.063	402.437		I-70 east to I-55 north / I-64 east – Indianapolis	Continuation into Illinois
1.000 mi = 1.609 km; 1.000 km = 0.621 mi: Closed/former; Concurrency terminus; Incomplete access

== Related routes ==
=== Alternate route ===
- I-70 Alt.

=== Business routes ===
- I-70 BL (Boonville)
- I-70 BL (Columbia)
- I-70 BL (St. Charles)

=== Auxiliary routes ===
- I-170
- I-270
- I-470
- I-670

Interstate 70
Previous state: Kansas	Missouri	Next state: Illinois
