= Fortyville, Missouri =

Extinct town in the American state of Missouri

Coordinates: 39.0047314°N 93.8079977°W

Fortyville is an extinct town in Lafayette County, in the U.S. state of Missouri.

The community took its name from its main thoroughfare, U.S. Route 40.
