= Daniel Boone Bridge =

Bridges across the Missouri River

- The bridge in 2020
- Coordinates: 38°41′15″N 90°39′47″W
- Carries: 8 lanes of I-64 / US 40 / US 61 (Avenue of the Saints)
- Crosses: Missouri River
- Locale: St. Louis County and St. Charles County in Missouri
- Maintained by: Missouri Department of Transportation

Characteristics
- Design: Continuous truss bridge (westbound span); Deck girder bridge (eastbound span)

History
- Opened: 1937 (original span); 1989 (westbound span); 2015 (eastbound span)

Statistics
- Daily traffic: 88,317 (2008)

Location
- Interactive map of Daniel Boone Bridge

The Daniel Boone Bridge is the name for two bridges carrying Interstate 64, U.S. Route 40, U.S. Route 61 and the Avenue of the Saints across the Missouri River between St. Louis County and St. Charles County, Missouri. The older bridge, which carries westbound traffic, is a continuous truss bridge, while the newer bridge, which carries eastbound traffic, is a deck girder bridge.

== History ==
In December, 1935 it was announced that the Kansas City Bridge Company was the lowest bidder (at $1.2 million) for the construction of a bridge across the Missouri River at Weldon Spring, Missouri. It was financed as a Public Works Administration project, with the Federal agency contributing 30% of the cost and the State of Missouri 70%. The bridge connected a roadway (originally designated as Relief Highway No. 40) that began at the junction of U.S. Highway 40 and U.S. Highway 61 in Wentzville, Missouri to Olive Street Road in western St. Louis County. Work on the bridge commenced in February, 1936 and was completed by June, 1937. Missouri Governor Lloyd C. Stark participated in the dedication of the bridge and roadway on Saturday June 26, 1937. The final cost of the project was $1.35 million. The bridge was 30 feet wide and provided an alternate route for the heavily congested old St. Charles Bridge that carried U.S. Highway 40 through St. Charles, Missouri into St. Louis.

Initially serving two lanes of travel, in the 1950s, it was restriped with a reversible lane controlled by signals.

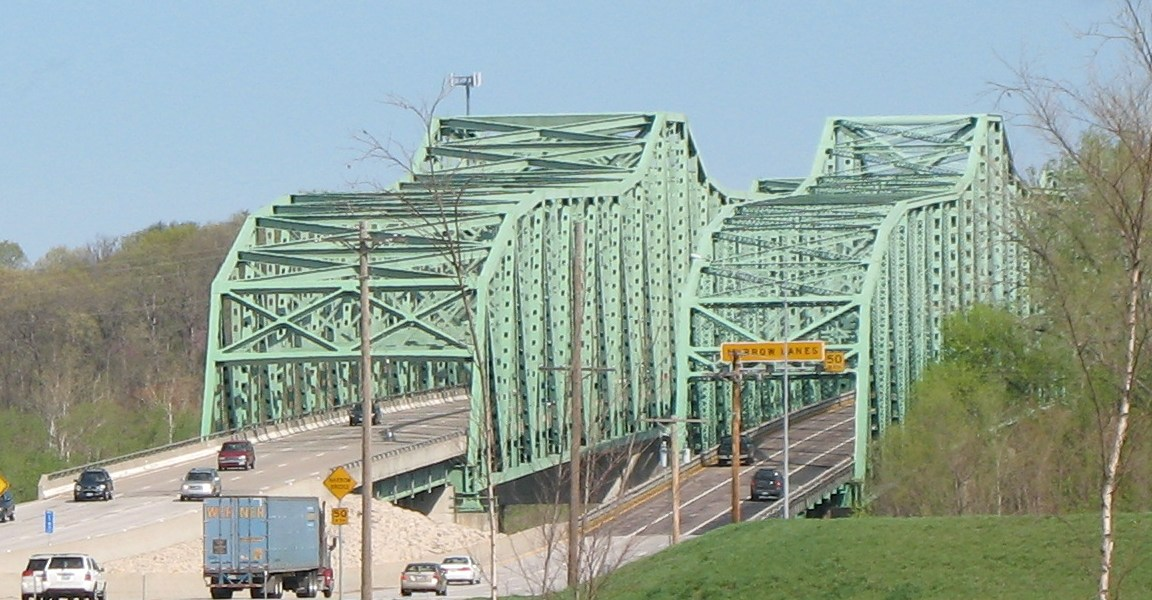
The 1989 bridge (left) alongside the original span. A new bridge has since been built to replace the original structure.

MoDOT opened an additional bridge upstream of the original span, as a result of increased congestion. The bridge was initially built for two eastbound lanes, however the shoulders were converted to travel lanes in 2001, for a total of four lanes. Following the opening of a parallel span in 1989, the original span was rehabilitated, then converted to serve two lanes of westbound traffic with a shoulder; the new span was converted to serve eastbound traffic.

In 2001, MoDOT restriped the westbound bridge back to three lanes; though they were now eastbound only. Additionally, the eastbound bridges shoulder was replaced by two travel lanes, this ended up rendering both of them functionally obsolete.

The westbound span was closed for emergency repairs to an expansion joint in 2010.

As the AADT rapidly increased, there came to be an increasing need for a wider bridge with standard-width lanes and shoulders, both of which the original bridge lacked. Furthermore, the aging structure had reached the point in life where regular maintenance was required, which not only was a money drain to the state, but was also an inconvenience to motorists due to the lane closures needed to safely make the repairs. As a result, MoDOT started planning for a new replacement in the early 2000s. MoDOT started studies for a new replacement around 2001 or 2002. On December 10, 2004, the Missouri Highways and Transportation Commission approved the design location of a third span, to be built upstream (to the west) of the two current spans. This new span will carry eastbound traffic, while the current eastbound span will carry westbound traffic. Funding was approved in July 2011 and construction is expected to begin in 2013. The Funding was finally unveiled in 2011, and in November, 2012 a design-build contract was awarded to the Walsh-Alberici joint venture team with designer Burns & McDonnell. Construction started in 2013 on a girder bridge, located upstream of the two existing bridges. All four eastbound lanes were routed onto the new bridge on June 28, 2015.

The eastbound bridge closed on June 28, 2015, to be rehabilitated, at which point it was temporarily carried over the original westbound span. The work was completed on November 5, 2015, on which day the bridge opened to westbound traffic. Eastbound traffic across the old bridge ceased on November 5, 2015, after the former eastbound span opened to westbound traffic. Although the bridge was eligible for the NRHP list, it was demolished in March 2016.

The new bridges bike/pedestrian attachment opened on June 9, 2016, and connects the Katy Trail to the Monarch Levee Trail.

== See also ==
- List of crossings of the Missouri River
