= Interstate 70 Business (Columbia, Missouri) =

Interstate 70 Business
- I-70 Bus. highlighted in red

Route information
- Business route of I-70
- Maintained by MoDOT
- Length: 2.874 mi (4.625 km)

Major junctions
- West end: I-70 / US 40 in Columbia
- Route 163 in Columbia; Route 763 in Columbia
- East end: I-70 / US 40 in Columbia

Location
- Country: United States
- State: Missouri
- Counties: Boone

Highway system
- Interstate Highway System; Main; Auxiliary; Suffixed; Business; Future; Missouri State Highway System; Interstate; US; State; Supplemental

Interstate 70 Business (I-70 Bus.) is a business loop for Interstate 70 (I-70) in Columbia, Missouri.

== Route description ==
I-70 Bus. starts at exit 125 on I-70/U.S. Route 40 (US 40) in Columbia. From this interchange, it runs east-southeasterly along a four-lane thoroughfare on the northern side of Columbia. The roadway is bounded by several businesses, including car dealerships and fast-food restaurants. I-70 Bus. intersects Route 163 (Providence Road) near Hickman High School. At the intersection with Range Line Street, Route 763 merges in from the north, and the two highways run concurrently for three blocks. Route 763 turns southward at the intersection with North College Avenue. I-70 Bus. intersects another highway, Supplemental Route B, on the eastern side of its routing before reaching Conley Road past Hinkson Creek through the 2018 expansion. Access to I-70/US 40 must go through the I-70 connector.

== History ==
The interchange at the eastern terminus used to allow eastbound traffic onto eastbound I-70/US 40, but, in 2018, the route was rerouted onto East Boulevard and over Hinkson Creek before reaching Conley Road near the I-70 connector. Exit 128 allowed westbound I-70/US 40 traffic to enter westbound I-70 Bus until it was closed in Fall 2024.

== Major intersections ==
The entire route is in Columbia, Boone County.

mi	km	Destinations	Notes
0.000– 0.141	0.000– 0.227	I-70 / US 40 – Kansas City, St. Louis	Exit 125 on I-70
1.031	1.659	Route 163 (Providence Road)	
1.525	2.454	Route 763 north (Range Line Street)	Western end of Route 763 concurrency
1.715	2.760	Route 763 south (North College Avenue)	Eastern end of Route 763 concurrency; access to Stephens College
2.233	3.594	Route B (Paris Road)	
2.874	4.625	I-70 east / US 40	Access to I-70 east and from I-70 west only at exit 128A (Exit 128 westbound off ramp closed in 2024 and eastbound on ramp closed in 2018)
1.000 mi = 1.609 km; 1.000 km = 0.621 mi: Concurrency terminus; Incomplete access

== Community improvement district ==
The business loop is the basis for community improvement district (CID) that was created by a 5–2 vote of the Columbia City Council in April 2015. Planners intended to pass a 0.5% sales tax in order to pay off significant debt and fund development projects and drew up a gerrymandered district devoid of residents in order to avoid a requirement of Missouri state law which requires decisions to impose a sales tax to be left to voters residing in the district. However, due to an error in planning, a single person, 23-year-old college student Jen Henderson, resides in the district.

The CID's director, Carrie Gartner, called the situation an "existential crisis" for the project, as it leaves the question of enacting the sales tax up to a single voter, adding "It's the law. It's legal. But [we are] not sure it's the way we want to go." Henderson says that Gartner approached her in June to ask her to withdraw her voting registration, but she refused, describing this as "manipulative" and citing concerns about taxing the food and necessities of low-income people. Later, an investigation by a local media source revealed 13 additional voters that in fact resided within the district.

Gartner later suggested that the election might not be held. The CID may have other options, including changing the boundaries of the district to exclude Henderson's residence or dissolving it.
