= Missouri Route 740 =

State highway in Missouri, U.S.

Route 740
- Stadium Boulevard

Route information
- Maintained by MoDOT
- Length: 6.329 mi (10.186 km)

Major junctions
- West end: I-70 / US 40 / Route E in Columbia
- Route 163 in Columbia; Route 763 in Columbia; US 63 in Columbia
- East end: Maguire Boulevard in Columbia

Location
- Country: United States
- State: Missouri
- Counties: Boone

Highway system
- Missouri State Highway System; Interstate; US; State; Supplemental
← I-670	→ Route 744

Missouri Route 740, better known as Stadium Boulevard, is a short highway located completely within the city of Columbia, Missouri, United States. Its western terminus is at Interstate 70/U.S. Route 40 (I-70/US 40), and its eastern terminus is at Maguire Boulevard in southeast Columbia, just east of U.S. Route 63 (US 63).

== Route description ==
Route 740 begins at an interchange with I-70/US 40 in Columbia, where the road continues north as Route E. From this interchange, the route heads south on Stadium Boulevard, a six-lane divided arterial. The road runs through business areas, passing to the east of the Columbia Mall. Route 740 intersects Route TT and becomes a four-lane undivided road that passes near wooded residential neighborhoods, turning to the east. The route heads onto the University of Missouri campus and intersects Route 163 (known locally as Providence Road) before passing to the north of Faurot Field. The road continues through the university campus and comes to an intersection with the southern terminus of Route 763. Route 740 heads east through wooded areas with some development as a four-lane divided highway. The route then comes to an interchange with US 63. Shortly after intersecting US 63, Route 740 dead-ends at Maguire Boulevard. However, future plans do call for the extension of Route 740 northeast past US 63, returning to I-70; once this is complete, it will utilize the existing Saint Charles Road then intersect at exit 131 (Saint Charles Road) on I-70, about three miles east of the interstate's US 63 junction.

== Major intersections ==
The entire route is in Columbia, Boone County.

mi	km	Destinations	Notes
0.000	0.000	Route E (Stadium Boulevard)	Western terminus, continuation beyond I-70/US 40
0.034– 0.044	0.055– 0.071	I-70 / US 40 – Kansas City, St. Louis	I-70/US 40 exit 124
1.026	1.651	Route TT / Broadway Boulevard	
3.990	6.421	Route 163 (Providence Road)	
4.669	7.514	Route 763 north (College Avenue) / Rock Quarry Road	Southern terminus of Route 763
6.329	10.186	US 63 – Moberly, Jefferson City	Interchange
6.4	10.3	Maguire Boulevard	Eastern terminus
		Route WW (Broadway Street)	Proposed
		I-70 – Kansas City, St. Louis	Proposed eastern terminus
1.000 mi = 1.609 km; 1.000 km = 0.621 mi
