= Blanchette Memorial Bridge =

Pair of bridges over the Missouri River

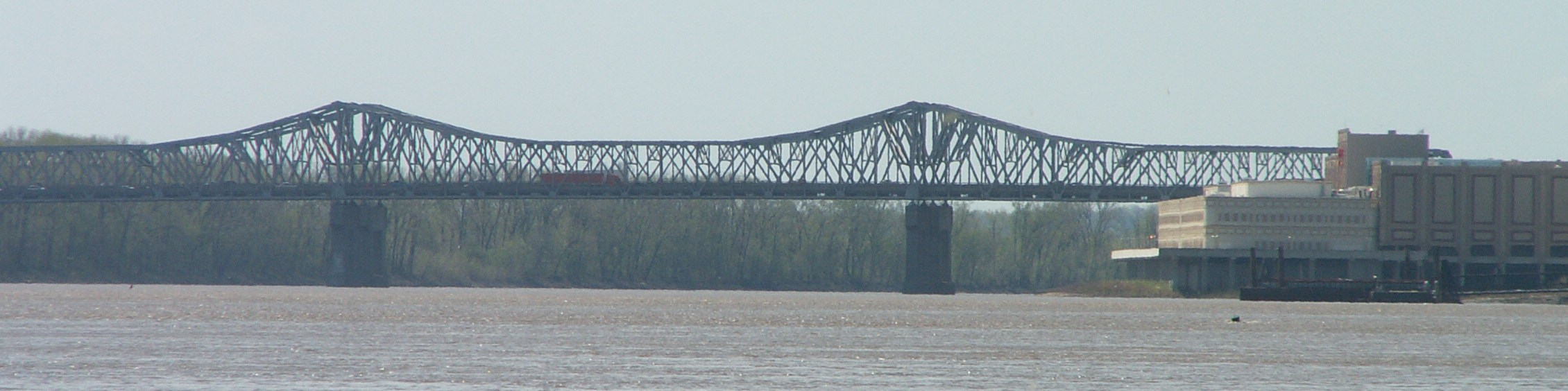
- Coordinates: 38.765°N 90.482°W
- Carries: 10 lanes of I-70
- Crosses: Missouri River
- Locale: St. Louis County and St. Charles County in Missouri
- Maintained by: Missouri Department of Transportation

Characteristics
- Design: Twin cantilever bridges
- Total length: 4,083 feet (1,244.5 m)
- Width: Westbound: 60 feet (18.3 m); Eastbound: 68 feet (20.7 m)
- Longest span: 480 feet (146.3 m)

History
- Opened: 1958-1959 (original; since converted westbound); 1978-1979 (eastbound)
- Rebuilt: 2013 (westbound)

Statistics
- Daily traffic: 153,161 (2008)

Location
- Interactive map of Blanchette Memorial Bridge

The Blanchette Memorial Bridge carries Interstate 70 across the Missouri River between St. Louis County and St. Charles County, Missouri. It is formed from a pair of twin cantilever bridges with the now westbound span opened in 1959 and eastbound bridge opened in 1979. At the bridge's crossing, the Missouri River reaches an average depth of 45 feet. It is the area's busiest bridge, handling an average of 165,000 vehicle transits per day. Construction of the first interstate highway project (under provisions of the Federal-Aid Highway Act of 1956) started west of the bridge's present location.

A sign commemorating the site of the nation's first interstate project stands next to Interstate 70 just east of the Missouri Route 94/First Capitol Drive overpass.

== History ==
In 1979, a second span was opened due to the fact that the two laned configuration had become obsolete. The bridge was then named for French Canadian fur trader and hunter Louis Blanchette, who founded St. Charles as a post along the Missouri River; the village was the first European settlement along this waterway.

Major rebuilding of the westbound span was planned by the Missouri Department of Transportation starting in the late 2000s. The project started with the closure of the westbound span on November 4, 2012. During the closure, westbound traffic was diverted to the freeway's east side, for three narrow lanes in each direction. The westbound bridge's old superstructure was demolished in two explosions, with the first taking place on November 18, 2012. The second and final blast was on December 4, 2012. Construction of the replacement superstructure started in spring 2013, and the bridge reopened more than two months ahead of schedule in August 2013. The entire project was completed in 2014.

In spring 2020, a repair project began on both bridges, with rehabilitation of the westbound span being completed in fall 2020 and the eastbound bridge in 2022.

== See also ==
- List of crossings of the Missouri River
