= Rocheport Bridge =

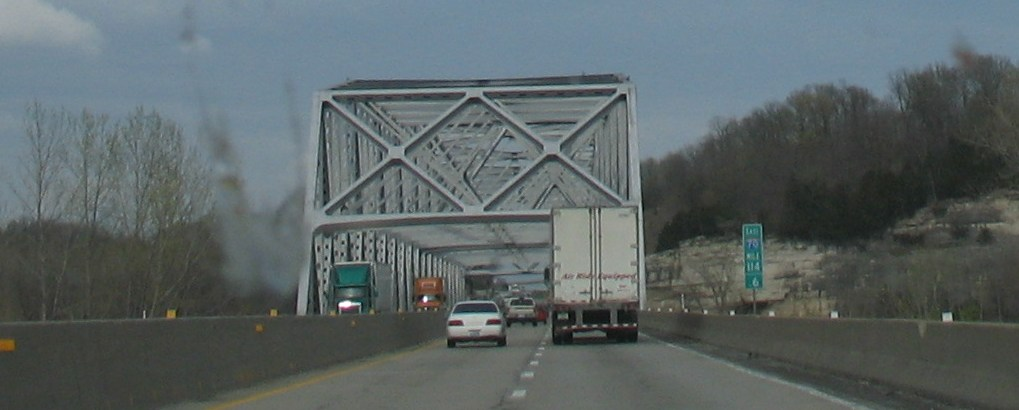
- Original Rocheport Bridge from southside looking to the bluffs
- Coordinates: 38°57′35″N 92°32′42″W
- Carried: I-70
- Crossed: Missouri River
- Locale: Rocheport, Missouri

Characteristics
- Design: Continuous truss
- Total length: 3,017.2 feet (919.6 m)
- Longest span: 550.7 feet (167.9 m)
- Clearance above: 20 feet (6.1 m)

History
- Opened: 1960 (original); 2023 (new bridge)
- Closed: 2023 (original)
- Demolished: 2023 (original)

The Rocheport Interstate 70 Bridge is a four-lane (soon to be six) bridge over the Missouri River on Interstate 70 (I-70) between Cooper and Boone counties near Rocheport.

The first bridge was built in 1960 and rehabilitated in 1994. Its main span was 550.7 feet (167.9 m) and had a total length of 3,017.2 feet (919.6 m). Its deck width was 60.3 feet (18.4 m), allowing for four lanes of traffic (two in each direction) and minimal shoulders. Vertical clearance was 20 feet (6.1 m).

In 2019, the Missouri Department of Transportation received an $81.2 million federal INFRA grant which provided the remaining necessary funding to replace the rapidly aging bridge. On July 1, 2021, MoDOT selected the Lunda Team as the design-build contractor for the project. The design includes two bridges (one for each direction of travel); each bridge will accommodate three travel lanes and full-width shoulders. Construction on the first bridge began in October 2021. The first was done in summer 2023 carrying both westbound and eastbound, will eventually be only carrying westbound only. The original bridge was imploded on the morning of September 10 of the same year. Fog delayed the implosion by over an hour. Footings of the old bridge were removed by blasting on October 30 and November 14. The second bridge for eastbound traffic will be constructed in the same location as the old bridge. The entire project was completed by the end of 2024. Post offline work with clean up continues through early 2025.

== See also ==
- List of crossings of the Missouri River
