= Missouri Route 163 =

State highway in Missouri, U.S.

Route 163
- Providence Road
- MO 163 highlighted in red

Route information
- Maintained by MoDOT
- Length: 14.322 mi (23.049 km)

Major junctions
- South end: US 63 / Route H southeast of Columbia
- North end: I-70 / US 40 in Columbia

Location
- Country: United States
- State: Missouri
- Counties: Boone

Highway system
- Missouri State Highway System; Interstate; US; State; Supplemental
← Route 162	→ Route 164

Route 163 is a highway in Boone County, Missouri, United States. Its northern terminus is at Interstate 70/U.S. Route 40 (I-70/US 40) in Columbia; its southern terminus is at U.S. Route 63 (US 63) south of Columbia. Route 163 passes through Rock Bridge State Park and Columbia is the only city on the highway. Within the city, the route is known locally as Providence Road.

== Route description ==
Route 163 begins at an interchange with US 63 and State Route H, with the latter leaving the interchange at the opposite side from Route 163. The highway then runs north parallel to US 63. This section was originally part of US 63 before being bypassed in 2011 and is now known locally as Tom Bass Road. Route 163 originally began at an at-grade intersection before being removed when a new US 63 southbound lane was built. After two miles (3.2 km) running parallel to US 63, Route 163 turns west and then passes in a northwesterly direction through Rock Bridge State Park. It briefly leaves the park to pass through the village of Pierpont, where Route N is intersected. After leaving the park, Route 163 turns north upon its intersection with Route K. North of the Route K intersection, the route enters the city of Columbia, through which the road is known locally as Providence Road. After entering Columbia, the route gains four-lane divided highway status, and then immediately passes Rock Bridge High School, one of four public high schools in the city. North of the school, the highway intersects Route AC, which is known locally as Nifong Boulevard. After crossing Hinkson Creek, Route 163 passes near the University of Missouri sports complex, including Faurot Field and the Mizzou Arena. Near the complex, the route loses its median barrier and crosses Route 740, also known as Stadium Boulevard. Route 163 then passes through Downtown Columbia. In the southwest corner of the intersection with Business Loop 70 lies Hickman High School, another public high school. Just north of Business Loop 70 is the route's northern end at I-70/US 40.

== Major intersections ==
The entire route is in Boone County.

Location	mi	km	Destinations	Notes
Three Creeks Township	0.000– 0.148	0.000– 0.238	US 63 / Route H – Jefferson City, Columbia	Southern terminus at a dumbbell interchange; western terminus of Route H; access to Columbia Regional Airport
Pierpont	6.195	9.970	Route N / S. Tomlin Road – Sapp	Northern terminus of Route N
Rock Bridge–Missouri– Columbia township tripoint	8.841	14.228	Route K – McBaine	Eastern terminus of Route K; access to Katy Trail State Park
Columbia	10.078	16.219	Route AC / Nifong Boulevard	Western terminus of Route AC
Columbia	12.115	19.497	Route 740 (Stadium Boulevard)	
Columbia	13.987	22.510	I-70 BL (Business Loop 70)	
Columbia	14.262– 14.322	22.952– 23.049	I-70 / US 40 – Kansas City, St. Louis	Northern terminus at a diamond interchange; Providence Road continues north under city maintenance
1.000 mi = 1.609 km; 1.000 km = 0.621 mi: Incomplete access
