= Missouri Route 763 =

State highway in Missouri, U.S.

Route 763
- College Avenue; Rangeline Road

Route information
- Maintained by MoDOT
- Length: 6.771 mi (10.897 km)

Major junctions
- South end: Route 740 in Columbia
- I-70 BL in Columbia; I-70 / US 40 in Columbia
- North end: US 63 north of Columbia

Location
- Country: United States
- State: Missouri
- Counties: Boone

Highway system
- Missouri State Highway System; Interstate; US; State; Supplemental
| ← Route 759 | → Route 765 |

Route 763 is a highway in Boone County, Missouri, United States. Its southern terminus is at Route 740 in the city of the Columbia. Between Route 740 and Business Loop Interstate 70 (BL I-70), it is known as College Avenue. It is briefly concurrent with BL I-70 for 2/10 mile (0.32 km) before turning onto Rangeline Road. This section between Business Loop 70 and US 63 is an old alignment of U.S. Route 63 (US 63).

== Route description ==
Route 763 begins at an intersection with Route 740 in Columbia, heading north on South College Avenue, a five-lane road with a center left-turn lane. The road passes through the University of Missouri campus, passing to the west of Sanborn Field. Past the university, the route intersects Broadway Street and becomes North College Avenue, passing homes and coming to an intersection with Paris Road, providing access to Route B, which officially begins past its junction with BL I-70. Route 763 passes more residences with some businesses and crosses a railroad line before coming to an intersection with BL I-70. At this point, Route 763 turns west to form a concurrency with BL I-70. on a four-lane divided highway before turning north onto four-lane undivided Rangeline Street. The road passes commercial establishments before becoming a divided highway and reaching an Dogbone interchange with I-70/US 40. Past this interchange, the route becomes undivided again and passes more businesses. Farther north, Route 763 becomes a divided highway and continues through areas of fields and businesses with some homes. The route reaches a roundabout where it intersects Route VV and Prathersville Road, the latter providing access to the southbound direction of US 63. Northbound motorists on US 63 must use Prathersville Road to access Route 763. Route 763 becomes a two-lane undivided road and merges into the northbound direction of US 63 at an interchange. Route 763 receives traffic from the southbound direction of US 63.

== Major intersections ==
The entire route is in Boone County.

| Location | mi | km | Destinations | Notes |
|---|---|---|---|---|
| Columbia | 0.000 | 0.000 | Route 740 (Stadium Boulevard) | |
| Columbia | 0.519 | 0.835 | Rollins Street | |
| Columbia | 1.158 | 1.864 | Broadway Street | |
| Columbia | 1.495 | 2.406 | Paris Road / Rogers Street | Access to Columbia College |
| Columbia | 2.028 | 3.264 | I-70 BL east | South end of I-70 Bus. overlap |
| Columbia | 2.218 | 3.570 | I-70 BL west | North end of I-70 Bus. overlap |
| Columbia | 2.535 | 4.080 | I-70 / US 40 – Kansas City, St. Louis | Exit 127 (I-70) |
| Prathersville | 5.835 | 9.391 | Route VV / Prathersville Road to US 63 south – Hinton | Access to southbound US 63 |
| | 6.771 | 10.897 | US 63 north – Moberly | Northbound exit and southbound entrance only |
1.000 mi = 1.609 km; 1.000 km = 0.621 mi: Concurrency terminus; Incomplete access
