= Emma, Missouri =

- City
- Location of Emma, Missouri
- Coordinates: 38°58′31″N 93°29′42″W
- Country: United States
- State: Missouri
- Counties: Saline, Lafayette
- Incorporated: 1958

Area
  - Total: 0.59 sq mi (1.52 km^{2})
  - Land: 0.59 sq mi (1.52 km^{2})
  - Water: 0 sq mi (0.00 km^{2})
- Elevation: 745 ft (227 m)

Population (2020)
  - Total: 201
  - Density: 343.0/sq mi (132.42/km^{2})
- Time zone: UTC-6 (Central (CST))
  - Summer (DST): UTC-5 (CDT)
- ZIP code: 65327
- Area code: 660
- FIPS code: 29-22312
- GNIS feature ID: 2394688

Emma is a city in Lafayette and Saline counties in the U.S. state of Missouri and is part of the Kansas City metropolitan area. The population was 201 at the 2020 census.

== History ==
The village has the name of Emma Demetrio, the daughter of a local minister.

The following are Excerpted from Robert W. Frizzell's 1977 article "'Killed by Rebels': A Civil War Massacre And Its Aftermath": Missouri Germans in general had a well-earned reputation among slaveowners as being opposed to slavery. Many St.Louis Germans were exiles from European political oppression. They desired and expected in the United States "a political and social utopia where the rights of the individual were held sacred."

In West Missouri, the first Germans arrived in southwestern Lafayette County in the late 1830s. In the 1840s and 50s more Germans came, most of them from Hanover in Northwest Germany. They came for neither religious nor political reasons but simply for improved economic opportunity in the form of available farmland.

When the war came in 1861, some sixty Lafayette-Saline Germans joined Frederick Becker's independent company of pro-Union Home Guards in Lafayette County in July. The company stationed itself at Lexington. During this time, with the Home Guards away, the community later known as Concordia experienced its first visit by Southern partisans. The Lutheran minister F. J. Biltz was interrogated, and Brockhoff's store was raided, and many of the community's horses and mules were confiscated. The community felt safer when a few days later 1200 Illinois troops passed through on their way to Lexington, but later in September, the entire Federal garrison at Lexington surrendered, including the Lafayette-Saline Germans. The Germans were released to go home after they were made to swear an oath not to take up arms again.

With the activation of the 71st EMM** in August 1862, fifty Germans from Lafayette-Saline joined, and the German community for a second time found many of its men away on militia duty. As had happened previously, Southern partisans visited the community. This time, however, the partisans were guerrillas who did not stop with confiscation of property. On October 5, 1862, several families along with Rev. Biltz and his wife gathered at the home of Julius Vogt for an infant baptism. After the ceremony, while the group finished an evening meal, some sixty shouting, cursing men on horseback surrounded the house. The bushwhackers took eleven men prisoners and took all the usable goods they could find. About a mile away, the killing began—the guerrillas took aside and shot three prisoners. In total, six were shot, three fatally, and five were freed.

On July 13, 1863 a second bushwhacker raid occurred in the German community. The bushwackers took four men prisoner, all of whom were members of Co. B. 71st EMM** and had been on active duty the previous year. The bushwhackers lined up the four and shot them dead. Again, no one is certain of the identities of these particular bushwhacker gangs, but David Poole and "Bloody Bill" Anderson, affiliates of William C. Quantrill, were notoriously opposed to the German farmers and militia. There was relative peace following this 1863 raid until the next summer.

The war was not going well for the Confederacy in 1864. General Price in Arkansas decided to take pressure off Confederates further east by leading his Missouri army on a great raid through its home state. Word reached the guerrillas that summer to disrupt Federal activities as much as possible in order to ready the countryside for Price's arrival. Thus in central and western Missouri, bushwhacking guerrilla raids occurred almost every day through the summer and early fall. Many of these incidents happened in or near Lafayette and Saline counties.

The night of October 9, 1864, a hundred bushwhackers camped somewhere near Brownsville (renamed Sweet Springs in the 1880s). The next morning Quantrill's men, led by David Poole and George Todd, decided to attack the German settlement lying to their west (in the Concordia area). About 50 Germans responded to the cow horns and arrived at the Lutheran Church. They divided into two groups—one rode east to aid Germans who had set an ambush at Davis Creek, and the other group went to guard a ford. The first group encountered the hundred guerrillas near the present town of Emma. Only one of the Germans survived. The bushwhackers smashed each of the 24 victim's skulls with a gun butt or club. Among the dead was Fred Dickenhorst, Maria's uncle. With the resistance eliminated, Quantrill's men went on a killing and burning spree amid the homes of the German community.

After they were finished with what was to be their last massacre, Quantrill's men rode further into Lafayette County. One leader of the last raid on October 10, 1864, George Todd, was killed October 21 as he scouted for General Price. The other leader, David Poole, survived the war to live peacefully in Lexington.

Excerpted from Robert W. Frizzell's 1977 article "'Killed by Rebels': A Civil War Massacre And Its Aftermath" http://haygenealogy.com/dankenbring/bushwhacker.html http://haygenealogy.com/dankenbring/sources/CW-KilledByRebels.pdf

== Geography ==
According to the United States Census Bureau, the city has a total area of 0.43 square miles (1.11 km^{2}), all land.

Emma is located south of Interstate 70.

== Demographics ==
Historical population
Census	Pop.	Note	%±
1960	202		—
1970	224		10.9%
1980	267		19.2%
1990	194		−27.3%
2000	243		25.3%
2010	233		−4.1%
2020	201		−13.7%
U.S. Decennial Census

=== 2010 census ===
As of the census of 2010, there were 233 people, 94 households, and 66 families residing in the city. The population density was 541.9 inhabitants per square mile (209.2/km^{2}). There were 106 housing units at an average density of 246.5 per square mile (95.2/km^{2}). The racial makeup of the city was 98.3% White and 1.7% from two or more races. Hispanic or Latino people of any race were 1.7% of the population.

There were 94 households, of which 26.6% had children under the age of 18 living with them, 61.7% were married couples living together, 5.3% had a female householder with no husband present, 3.2% had a male householder with no wife present, and 29.8% were non-families. 23.4% of all households were made up of individuals, and 11.7% had someone living alone who was 65 years of age or older. The average household size was 2.48 and the average family size was 3.00.

The median age in the city was 42.4 years. 22.3% of residents were under the age of 18; 7.4% were between the ages of 18 and 24; 23.1% were from 25 to 44; 25.8% were from 45 to 64; and 21.5% were 65 years of age or older. The gender makeup of the city was 51.9% male and 48.1% female.

=== 2000 census ===
As of the census of 2000, there were 243 people, 93 households, and 75 families residing in the city. The population density was 562.3 inhabitants per square mile (217.1/km^{2}). There were 98 housing units at an average density of 226.8 per square mile (87.6/km^{2}). The racial makeup of the city was 98.77% White, and 1.23% from two or more races. Hispanic or Latino people of any race were 0.82% of the population.

There were 93 households, out of which 33.3% had children under the age of 18 living with them, 71.0% were married couples living together, 5.4% had a female householder with no husband present, and 18.3% were non-families. 16.1% of all households were made up of individuals, and 10.8% had someone living alone who was 65 years of age or older. The average household size was 2.61 and the average family size was 2.92.

In the city the population was spread out, with 26.3% under the age of 18, 7.0% from 18 to 24, 23.5% from 25 to 44, 23.9% from 45 to 64, and 19.3% who were 65 years of age or older. The median age was 39 years. For every 100 females, there were 99.2 males. For every 100 females age 18 and over, there were 96.7 males.

The median income for a household in the city was $34,167, and the median income for a family was $47,500. Males had a median income of $28,750 versus $22,917 for females. The per capita income for the city was $14,994. About 7.4% of families and 12.4% of the population were below the poverty line, including 22.4% of those under the age of eighteen and 4.0% of those 65 or over.

=== Local attractions ===
The Emma Indoor Raceway is located on the north side of Interstate 70, the raceway operates during the winter months as an indoor dirt track hosting Quad Bike TT racing and a dirt oval for kart racing. Races are typically held on Saturday evenings from October to February. Karts and Quads race on alternating weekends.

The Tri-City Country Club is located west of the Emma Post Office, The Tri-City Country Club features an 9-hole golf course, as well as a pool.

== Education ==
The portion of Emma in Lafayette County is in the Concordia R-II School District. The portion of Emma in Saline County is in the Sweet Springs R-VII School District.

Metropolitan Community College has the Concordia school district area in its service area, but not its in-district taxation area.
