= Truesdale, Missouri =

- City
- Location of Truesdale, Missouri
- Coordinates: 38°48′38″N 91°7′41″W
- Country: United States
- State: Missouri
- County: Warren

Area
  - Total: 1.29 sq mi (3.35 km^{2})
  - Land: 1.28 sq mi (3.32 km^{2})
  - Water: 0.015 sq mi (0.04 km^{2})
- Elevation: 860 ft (262 m)

Population (2020)
  - Total: 853
  - Density: 666.1/sq mi (257.18/km^{2})
- Time zone: UTC-6 (Central (CST))
  - Summer (DST): UTC-5 (CDT)
- ZIP code: 63380
- Area code: 636
- FIPS code: 29-73978
- GNIS feature ID: 0740024
- Website: cityoftruesdalemo.org

Truesdale is a city in Warren County, Missouri, United States. It is directly adjacent to the east of Warrenton and is part of the St. Louis MSA. As of the 2020 census, Truesdale had a population of 853.

== History ==
Truesdale was laid out in 1857 when the railroad was extended to that point. The community has the name of William Truesdale, a railroad man. Variant names were "Truesdail" and "Truesdaile". A post office called Truesdail was established in 1889, and remained in operation until 1979.

== Geography ==
Truesdale is located at 38°48′38″N 91°7′41″W (38.810499, -91.128194).

According to the United States Census Bureau, the city has a total area of 1.29 square miles (3.34 km^{2}), of which 1.27 square miles (3.29 km^{2}) is land and 0.02 square miles (0.05 km^{2}) is water.

== Economy ==
Notable companies in Truesdale are Cascade Plastics, Oldcastle Glass, Warrenton Oil, Coca-Cola, River City Steel, Metso Minerals Sealcraft, and Microfinish. Truesdale has direct access to rail and interstate traffic via Interstate 70. Industry consists of light manufacturing.

== Demographics ==
Historical population
Census	Pop.	Note	%±
1880	91		—
1930	185		—
1940	199		7.6%
1950	235		18.1%
1960	217		−7.7%
1970	262		20.7%
1980	297		13.4%
1990	285		−4.0%
2000	397		39.3%
2010	732		84.4%
2020	853		16.5%
U.S. Decennial Census

=== 2010 census ===
As of the census of 2010, there were 732 people, 270 households, and 175 families residing in the city. The population density was 576.4 inhabitants per square mile (222.5/km^{2}). There were 304 housing units at an average density of 239.4 per square mile (92.4/km^{2}). The racial makeup of the city was 87.7% White, 5.6% African American, 1.0% Native American, 0.5% Asian, 0.4% Pacific Islander, 1.4% from other races, and 3.4% from two or more races. Hispanic or Latino of any race were 3.3% of the population.

There were 270 households, of which 40.4% had children under the age of 18 living with them, 37.0% were married couples living together, 22.6% had a female householder with no husband present, 5.2% had a male householder with no wife present, and 35.2% were non-families. 28.5% of all households were made up of individuals, and 6.7% had someone living alone who was 65 years of age or older. The average household size was 2.71 and the average family size was 3.30.

The median age in the city was 29.1 years. 30.9% of residents were under the age of 18; 10.9% were between the ages of 18 and 24; 30.1% were from 25 to 44; 20.1% were from 45 to 64; and 7.9% were 65 years of age or older. The gender makeup of the city was 51.9% male and 48.1% female.

=== 2000 census ===
As of the census of 2000, there were 397 people, 145 households, and 94 families residing in the city. The population density was 360.6 inhabitants per square mile (139.2/km^{2}). There were 172 housing units at an average density of 156.2 per square mile (60.3/km^{2}). The racial makeup of the city was 88.66% White, 6.05% African American, 1.26% Native American, 0.76% Asian, 0.76% from other races, and 2.52% from two or more races. Hispanic or Latino of any race were 5.29% of the population.

There were 145 households, out of which 35.2% had children under the age of 18 living with them, 40.7% were married couples living together, 16.6% had a female householder with no husband present, and 34.5% were non-families. 29.0% of all households were made up of individuals, and 8.3% had someone living alone who was 65 years of age or older. The average household size was 2.74 and the average family size was 3.45.

In the city, the population was spread out, with 32.0% under the age of 18, 8.1% from 18 to 24, 33.5% from 25 to 44, 15.4% from 45 to 64, and 11.1% who were 65 years of age or older. The median age was 32 years. For every 100 females, there were 114.6 males. For every 100 females age 18 and over, there were 117.7 males.

The median income for a household in the city was $28,359, and the median income for a family was $29,583. Males had a median income of $27,679 versus $21,125 for females. The per capita income for the city was $10,483. About 20.2% of families and 21.8% of the population were below the poverty line, including 25.6% of those under age 18 and 20.0% of those age 65 or over.

== Climate ==
Climate is characterized by relatively high temperatures and evenly distributed precipitation throughout the year. The Köppen Climate Classification subtype for this climate is "Cfa". (Humid Subtropical Climate).

Climate data for Truesdale, Missouri
Month	Jan	Feb	Mar	Apr	May	Jun	Jul	Aug	Sep	Oct	Nov	Dec	Year
Mean daily maximum °C (°F)	4 (39)	6 (42)	12 (53)	19 (66)	24 (75)	29 (84)	32 (89)	31 (87)	27 (80)	20 (68)	12 (53)	5 (41)	18 (65)
Mean daily minimum °C (°F)	−6 (21)	−5 (23)	0 (32)	6 (42)	11 (51)	16 (60)	19 (66)	18 (64)	13 (55)	7 (44)	1 (33)	−4 (24)	6 (43)
Average precipitation mm (inches)	51 (2.0)	51 (2.0)	84 (3.3)	100 (4.0)	110 (4.4)	110 (4.3)	86 (3.4)	79 (3.1)	99 (3.9)	76 (3.0)	74 (2.9)	53 (2.1)	970 (38.3)
Source: Weatherbase

== Government ==
The Truesdale Police Department consist of a full-time Chief of Police, a full-time sergeant, a full-time School Resource Officer and three part-time officers.

== Education ==
It is in the Warren County R-III School District.

Rebecca Boone Elementary (K-5th) is located within the City of Truesdale.
