= Deutschheim State Historic Site =

Historic site in Missouri, United States

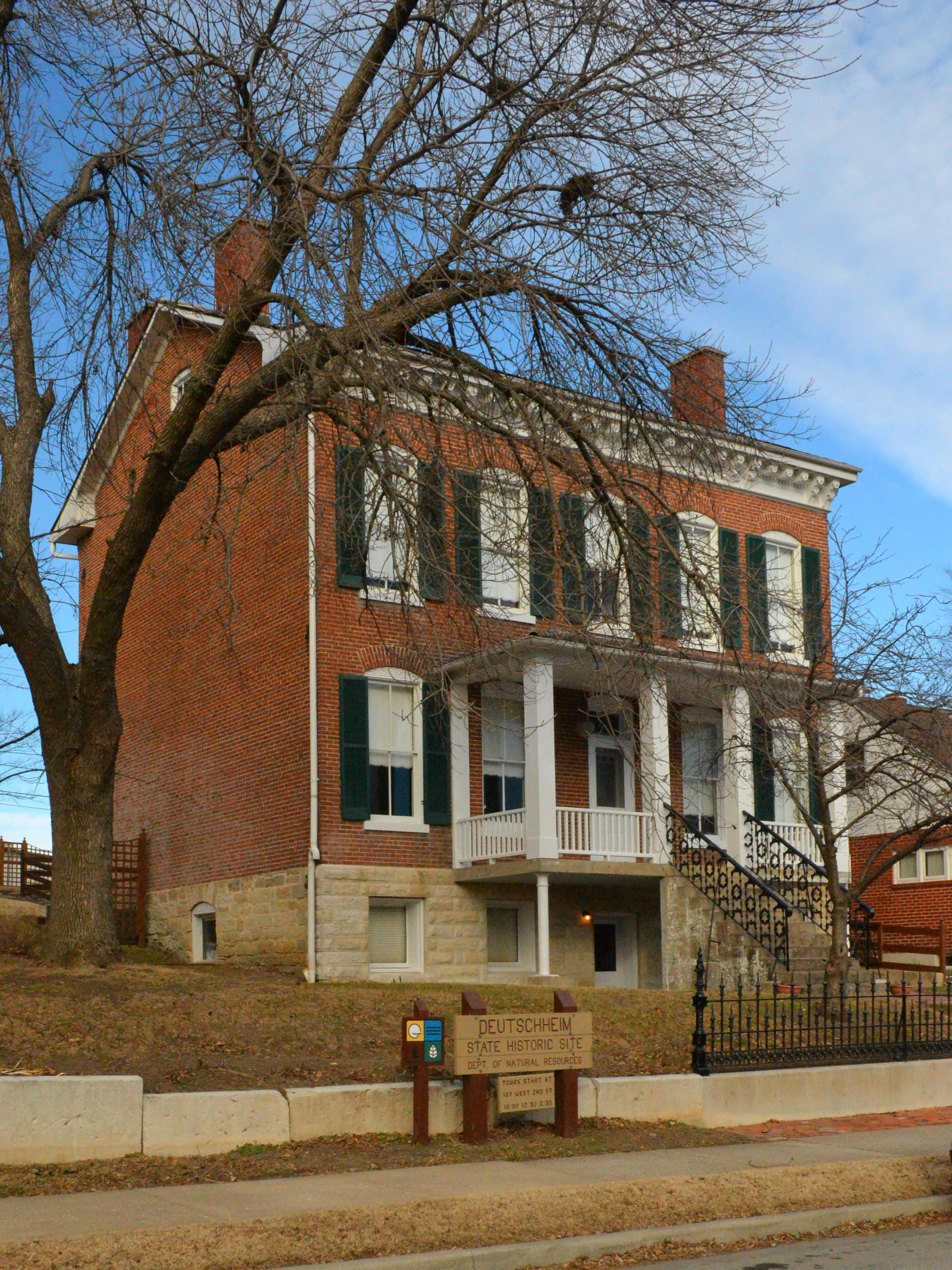

- Location within Missouri Location within the United States
- Location: Hermann, Gasconade County, Missouri, United States
- Coordinates: 38°42′22″N 91°26′17″W
- Area: 0.69 acres (0.28 ha)
- Established: 1978
- Visitors: 3,606 (in 2022)
- Governing body: Missouri Department of Natural Resources
- Website: Deutschheim Historic Site

Deutschheim State Historic Site is a state-owned property located in Hermann, Missouri, United States, preserving historic houses and other structures, such as a barn and winery, built and used by German immigrants in the middle 19th century. The architecture covers a range of contemporary styles brought from Germany and interpreted in the United States, and the houses have furnishings reflective of mid-century German families in Missouri. The site includes grapes planted in one of the original vineyards and the site of a printing press. The buildings include exhibits of tools and artifacts of the period, giving a picture of the immigrant journey to Missouri, daily life, and German-Missourians' contributions to the Union during the American Civil War. Tours of the grounds are offered for the public. The site was acquired by the state in 1978 and is managed by the Missouri Department of Natural Resources.
