= Mayview, Missouri =

- City
- Location of Mayview, Missouri
- Coordinates: 39°03′10″N 93°50′00″W
- Country: United States
- State: Missouri
- County: Lafayette
- Incorporated: 1957

Area
  - Total: 0.16 sq mi (0.41 km^{2})
  - Land: 0.16 sq mi (0.41 km^{2})
  - Water: 0 sq mi (0.00 km^{2})
- Elevation: 886 ft (270 m)

Population (2020)
  - Total: 208
  - Density: 1,329.8/sq mi (513.43/km^{2})
- Time zone: UTC-6 (Central (CST))
  - Summer (DST): UTC-5 (CDT)
- ZIP code: 64071
- Area code: 660
- FIPS code: 29-46964
- GNIS feature ID: 2395056

Mayview is a city in Lafayette County, Missouri, and part of the Kansas City metropolitan area within the United States. The population was 208 at the 2020 census.

== History ==
Mayview was platted in 1866. The city was named for its scenic landscape, "when viewed on a May day". A post office called Mayview has been in operation since 1865.

== Geography ==
According to the United States Census Bureau, the city has a total area of 0.16 square miles (0.41 km^{2}), all land.

== Demographics ==
Historical population
Census	Pop.	Note	%±
1900	423		—
1910	308		−27.2%
1920	406		31.8%
1930	322		−20.7%
1940	325		0.9%
1950	268		−17.5%
1960	270		0.7%
1970	330		22.2%
1980	291		−11.8%
1990	279		−4.1%
2000	294		5.4%
2010	212		−27.9%
2020	208		−1.9%
U.S. Decennial Census

=== 2010 census ===
At the 2010 census there were 211 people in 80 households, including 58 families, in the city. The population density was 1,325.0 inhabitants per square mile (511.6/km^{2}). There were 92 housing units at an average density of 575.0 per square mile (222.0/km^{2}). The racial makup of the city was 89.6% White, 7.5% African American, 0.5% Asian, 0.9% from other races, and 1.4% from two or more races. Hispanic or Latino of any race were 0.9%.

Of the 80 households, 35.0% had children under the age of 18 living with them, 52.5% were married couples living together, 15.0% had a female householder with no husband present, 5.0% had a male householder with no wife present, and 27.5% were non-families. 22.5% of households were one person, and 7.5% were one person aged 65 or older. The average household size was 2.65 and the average family size was 3.07.

The median age was 37.5 years. 25.9% of residents were under the age of 18; 7.1% were between the ages of 18 and 24; 27.4% were from 25 to 44; 26.9% were from 45 to 64; and 12.7% were 65 or older. The gender makeup of the city was 47.2% male and 52.8% female.

=== 2000 census ===
At the 2000 census there were 294 people in 100 households, including 82 families, in the city. The population density was 1,885.9 inhabitants per square mile (728.2/km^{2}). There were 111 housing units at an average density of 712.0 per square mile (274.9/km^{2}). The racial makup of the city was 87.41% White, 9.52% African American, 1.02% Native American, and 2.04% from two or more races. Hispanic or Latino of any race were 2.72%.

Of the 100 households, 49.0% had children under the age of 18 living with them, 63.0% were married couples living together, 15.0% had a female householder with no husband present, and 18.0% were non-families. 15.0% of households were one person, and 4.0% were one person aged 65 or older. The average household size was 2.94 and the average family size was 3.29.

In the city the population was spread out, with 33.3% under the age of 18, 6.1% from 18 to 24, 32.7% from 25 to 44, 17.7% from 45 to 64, and 10.2% 65 or older. The median age was 33 years. For every 100 females, there were 88.5 males. For every 100 females age 18 and over, there were 94.1 males.

The median household income was $25,313 and the median family income was $28,750. Males and females had median incomes of $24,063 and $17,875, respectively. The per capita income for the city was $10,784. About 11.4% of families and 14.1% of the population were below the poverty line, including 13.6% of those under the age of eighteen and 21.7% of those 65 or over.

== Education ==
It is in the Odessa R-VII School District.

Metropolitan Community College has the school district area in its service area, but not its in-district taxation area.
