= Ranken Technical College =

Private college in St. Louis, Missouri, US

Coordinates: 38°39′12″N 90°14′54″W

- Type: Private technical school
- Established: 1907
- Location: St. Louis, Missouri, United States
- Website: www.ranken.edu

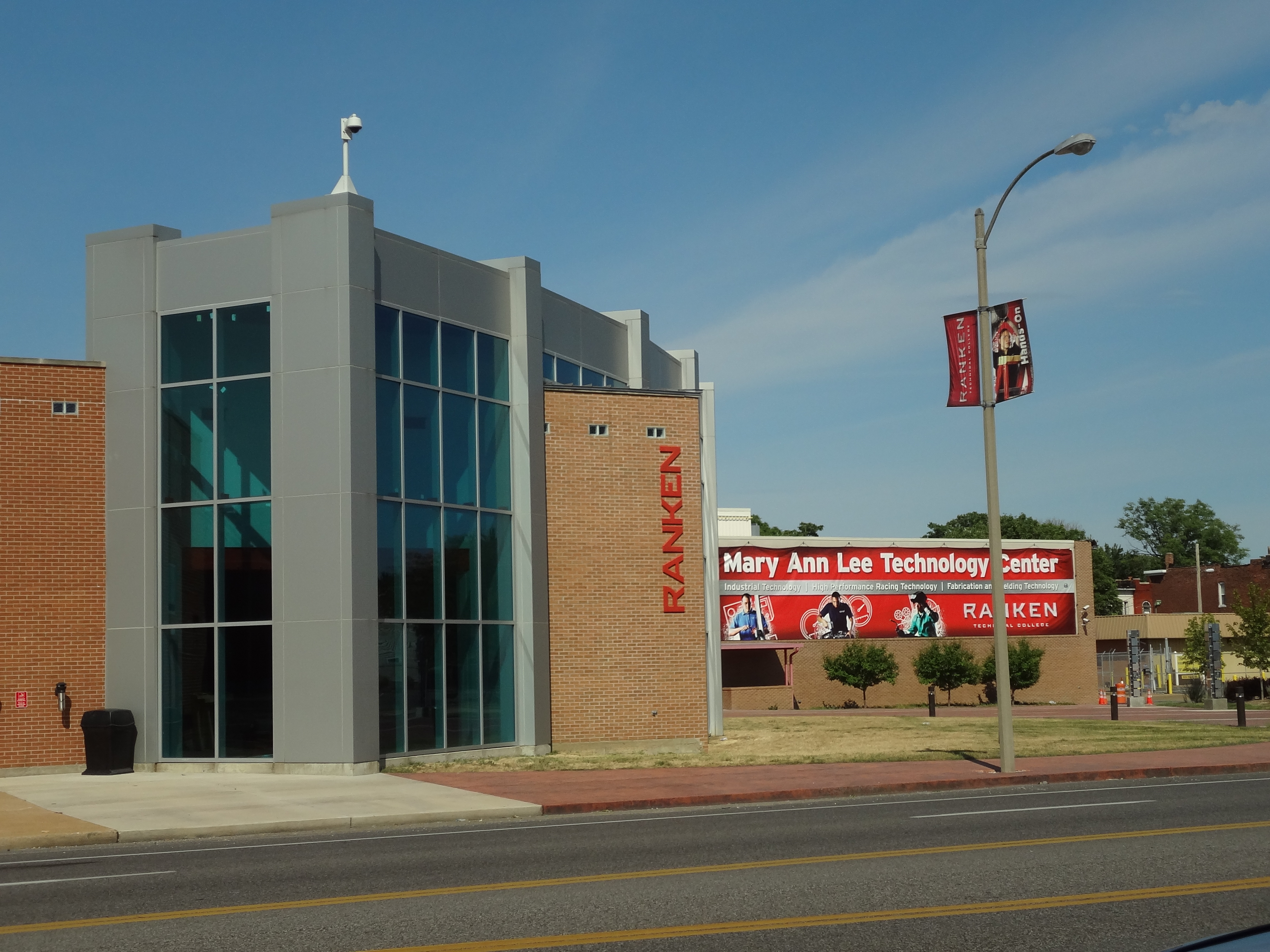
Ranken Technical College

Ranken Technical College is a private technical school in St. Louis, Missouri. It offers programs in five main divisions: Automotive, Electrical, Construction, Information Technology, and Manufacturing. The school has a student body consisting of approximately 2,300 students.

== History ==
Ranken Technical College was founded in 1907 by David Ranken Jr., as a private, non-profit educational institution to train students for employment in a variety of technical and mechanical occupations. Established with a foundation deed of more than $1 million, Ranken began its first academic year in September 1909. David Ranken later added his entire fortune to the school's endowment, which, since then, has contributed to the substantial growth of the college and helped to reduce annual operating costs and tuition.

== Academics ==
Ranken Technical College is accredited by the Higher Learning Commission. It offers primarily associate degrees although it also offers two bachelor degree programs.

== Ranken Community Development Corporation (RCDC) ==
Recognizing a need for housing in the community it serves, Ranken Technical College established the Ranken Community Development Corporation (RCDC) in April 1994. Prior to establishing the RCDC, Ranken students exercised their skills through projects with community organizations such as Habitat for Humanity. As student and project schedules became more difficult to coordinate, the college began working to establish a non-profit, Ranken-run organization capable of providing affordable housing to the Central West End community.

The program combines the technical skills of its students and faculty with the need for affordable housing, enhancing North St. Louis city's neighborhoods.

Through the RCDC and their required curriculum, students receive hands-on experience in the carpentry and plumbing involved in the construction and renovation of single-family homes. The non-profit organization has built more than 50 homes to date. For each house, students and faculty members from Architectural Technology, Carpentry and Building Construction Technology, Plumbing Technology, and Heating, Ventilation, Air Conditioning and Refrigeration Technology use their skills to build houses in the neighborhood surrounding the college.

Once the houses are completed, they are sold. Proceeds are then used to build more homes and involve future students in home building projects.
