= Jonesburg, Missouri =

City in Missouri, US

- City
- Jonesburg in September 2026

- Location in Montgomery County and the state of Missouri
- Coordinates: 38°51′17″N 91°18′10″W
- Country: United States
- State: Missouri
- County: Montgomery

Area
  - Total: 1.54 sq mi (3.98 km^{2})
  - Land: 1.54 sq mi (3.98 km^{2})
  - Water: 0 sq mi (0.00 km^{2})
- Elevation: 889 ft (271 m)

Population (2020)
  - Total: 726
  - Density: 472.9/sq mi (182.59/km^{2})
- Time zone: UTC-6 (Central (CST))
  - Summer (DST): UTC-5 (CDT)
- ZIP code: 63351
- Area code: 636
- FIPS code: 29-37574
- GNIS feature ID: 2395481
- Website: www.cityofjonesburg.com

Jonesburg is a city in Montgomery County, Missouri, United States. The population was 726 at the 2020 census.

== History ==
Jonesburg was platted in 1858 and named in honor of James Jones, a pioneer citizen. A post office called "Jonesburgh" was established in 1868, and the name was changed to Jonesburg in 1893.

Cabin in Jonesburg, Missouri, part of Jonesburg Historical Museum

== Geography ==
Jonesburg is in eastern Montgomery County, with a portion of its southern border following the Warren County line. Interstate 70/U.S. Route 40 passes through the north side of the city, with access from Exit 183 (North 1st Street). I-70 leads east 66 miles (106 km) to St. Louis and west 58 miles (93 km) to Columbia.

According to the U.S. Census Bureau, Jonesburg has a total area of 1.72 square miles (4.45 km^{2}), all land. The city lies on a wide ridge which drains north toward Little Bear Creek, part of the Cuivre River watershed flowing directly to the Mississippi; and drains south toward Bear Creek, part of the Loutre River watershed leading to the Missouri River.

== Demographics ==
Historical population
Census	Pop.	Note	%±
1880	445		—
1890	437		−1.8%
1900	407		−6.9%
1910	456		12.0%
1920	473		3.7%
1930	432		−8.7%
1940	422		−2.3%
1950	433		2.6%
1960	415		−4.2%
1970	479		15.4%
1980	614		28.2%
1990	630		2.6%
2000	695		10.3%
2010	768		10.5%
2020	726		−5.5%
U.S. Decennial Census

=== 2010 census ===
As of the census of 2010, there were 768 people, 281 households, and 175 families living in the city. The population density was 656.4 inhabitants per square mile (253.4/km^{2}). There were 325 housing units at an average density of 277.8 per square mile (107.3/km^{2}). The racial makeup of the city was 94.3% White, 0.8% African American, 0.3% Native American, 0.1% Asian, 1.2% from other races, and 3.4% from two or more races. Hispanic or Latino of any race were 2.2% of the population.

There were 281 households, of which 31.7% had children under the age of 18 living with them, 43.8% were married couples living together, 12.1% had a female householder with no husband present, 6.4% had a male householder with no wife present, and 37.7% were non-families. 32.0% of all households were made up of individuals, and 17.1% had someone living alone who was 65 years of age or older. The average household size was 2.42 and the average family size was 3.02.

The median age in the city was 41.3 years. 24.1% of residents were under the age of 18; 6.5% were between the ages of 18 and 24; 22.8% were from 25 to 44; 21.3% were from 45 to 64; and 25.3% were 65 years of age or older. The gender makeup of the city was 45.1% male and 54.9% female.

=== 2000 census ===
As of the census of 2000, there were 695 people, 269 households, and 161 families living in the city. The population density was 553.3 inhabitants per square mile (213.6/km^{2}). There were 296 housing units at an average density of 235.7 per square mile (91.0/km^{2}). The racial makeup of the city was 96.69% White, 1.44% African American, 0.14% Native American, and 1.73% from two or more races. Hispanic or Latino of any race were 0.58% of the population.

There were 269 households, out of which 27.9% had children under the age of 18 living with them, 42.0% were married couples living together, 11.5% had a female householder with no husband present, and 40.1% were non-families. 34.9% of all households were made up of individuals, and 21.2% had someone living alone who was 65 years of age or older. The average household size was 2.40 and the average family size was 3.03.

In the city the population was spread out, with 23.9% under the age of 18, 9.6% from 18 to 24, 26.3% from 25 to 44, 17.4% from 45 to 64, and 22.7% who were 65 years of age or older. The median age was 38 years. For every 100 females there were 85.3 males. For every 100 females age 18 and over, there were 84.3 males.

The median income for a household in the city was $26,875, and the median income for a family was $31,786. Males had a median income of $25,446 versus $20,000 for females. The per capita income for the city was $13,230. About 14.7% of families and 16.8% of the population were below the poverty line, including 18.9% of those under age 18 and 23.6% of those age 65 or over.

== Education ==
It is in the Montgomery County R-II School District.
