= Mount Leonard, Missouri =

Village in Saline County, Missouri, United States

- Village
- Location of Mount Leonard, Missouri
- Coordinates: 39°7′32″N 93°23′41″W
- Country: United States
- State: Missouri
- County: Saline

Area
  - Total: 0.10 sq mi (0.27 km^{2})
  - Land: 0.10 sq mi (0.27 km^{2})
  - Water: 0 sq mi (0.00 km^{2})
- Elevation: 801 ft (244 m)

Population (2020)
  - Total: 65
  - Density: 626.3/sq mi (241.83/km^{2})
- Time zone: UTC-6 (Central (CST))
  - Summer (DST): UTC-5 (CDT)
- FIPS code: 29-50510
- GNIS feature ID: 2396790

Mount Leonard is a village in Saline County, Missouri, United States. The population was 87 at the 2010 census.

== History ==
Mount Leonard was platted in 1877, and named after Abiel Leonard, the original owner of the town site. A post office called Mount Leonard was established in 1878, and remained in operation until 1957.

== Geography ==
According to the United States Census Bureau, the village has a total area of 0.10 square miles (0.26 km^{2}), all land.

== Demographics ==
Historical population
Census	Pop.	Note	%±
1880	28		—
1890	106		278.6%
1900	132		24.5%
1910	146		10.6%
1920	174		19.2%
1930	169		−2.9%
1940	150		−11.2%
1950	142		−5.3%
1960	147		3.5%
1970	139		−5.4%
1980	131		−5.8%
1990	96		−26.7%
2000	123		28.1%
2010	87		−29.3%
2020	65		−25.3%
U.S. Decennial Census

=== 2010 census ===
As of the census of 2010, there were 87 people, 30 households, and 24 families living in the village. The population density was 870.0 inhabitants per square mile (335.9/km^{2}). There were 33 housing units at an average density of 330.0 per square mile (127.4/km^{2}). The racial makeup of the village was 83.9% White, 1.1% African American, 1.1% Asian, and 13.8% from two or more races.

There were 30 households, of which 43.3% had children under the age of 18 living with them, 60.0% were married couples living together, 13.3% had a female householder with no husband present, 6.7% had a male householder with no wife present, and 20.0% were non-families. 20.0% of all households were made up of individuals, and 10% had someone living alone who was 65 years of age or older. The average household size was 2.90 and the average family size was 3.29.

The median age in the village was 38.3 years. 34.5% of residents were under the age of 18; 3.4% were between the ages of 18 and 24; 22.9% were from 25 to 44; 26.3% were from 45 to 64; and 12.6% were 65 years of age or older. The gender makeup of the village was 52.9% male and 47.1% female.

=== 2000 census ===
As of the census of 2000, there were 123 people, 38 households, and 31 families living in the town. The population density was 1,215.0 inhabitants per square mile (469.1/km^{2}). There were 44 housing units at an average density of 434.6 per square mile (167.8/km^{2}). The racial makeup of the town was 94.31% White, 2.44% African American, 0.81% Native American, and 2.44% from two or more races.

There were 38 households, out of which 42.1% had children under the age of 18 living with them, 65.8% were married couples living together, 15.8% had a female householder with no husband present, and 18.4% were non-families. 15.8% of all households were made up of individuals, and 7.9% had someone living alone who was 65 years of age or older. The average household size was 3.24 and the average family size was 3.48.

In the town the population was spread out, with 36.6% under the age of 18, 8.9% from 18 to 24, 23.6% from 25 to 44, 20.3% from 45 to 64, and 10.6% who were 65 years of age or older. The median age was 31 years. For every 100 females, there were 89.2 males. For every 100 females age 18 and over, there were 95.0 males.

The median income for a household in the town was $20,833, and the median income for a family was $18,750. Males had a median income of $18,125 versus $13,906 for females. The per capita income for the town was $7,405. There were 46.2% of families and 48.4% of the population living below the poverty line, including 69.1% of under eighteens and 18.8% of those over 64.

== Education ==
It is in the Malta Bend R-V School District.

== See also ==
- List of cities in Missouri
