= Harry S. Truman Memorial Veterans' Hospital =

- VA Heartland Network
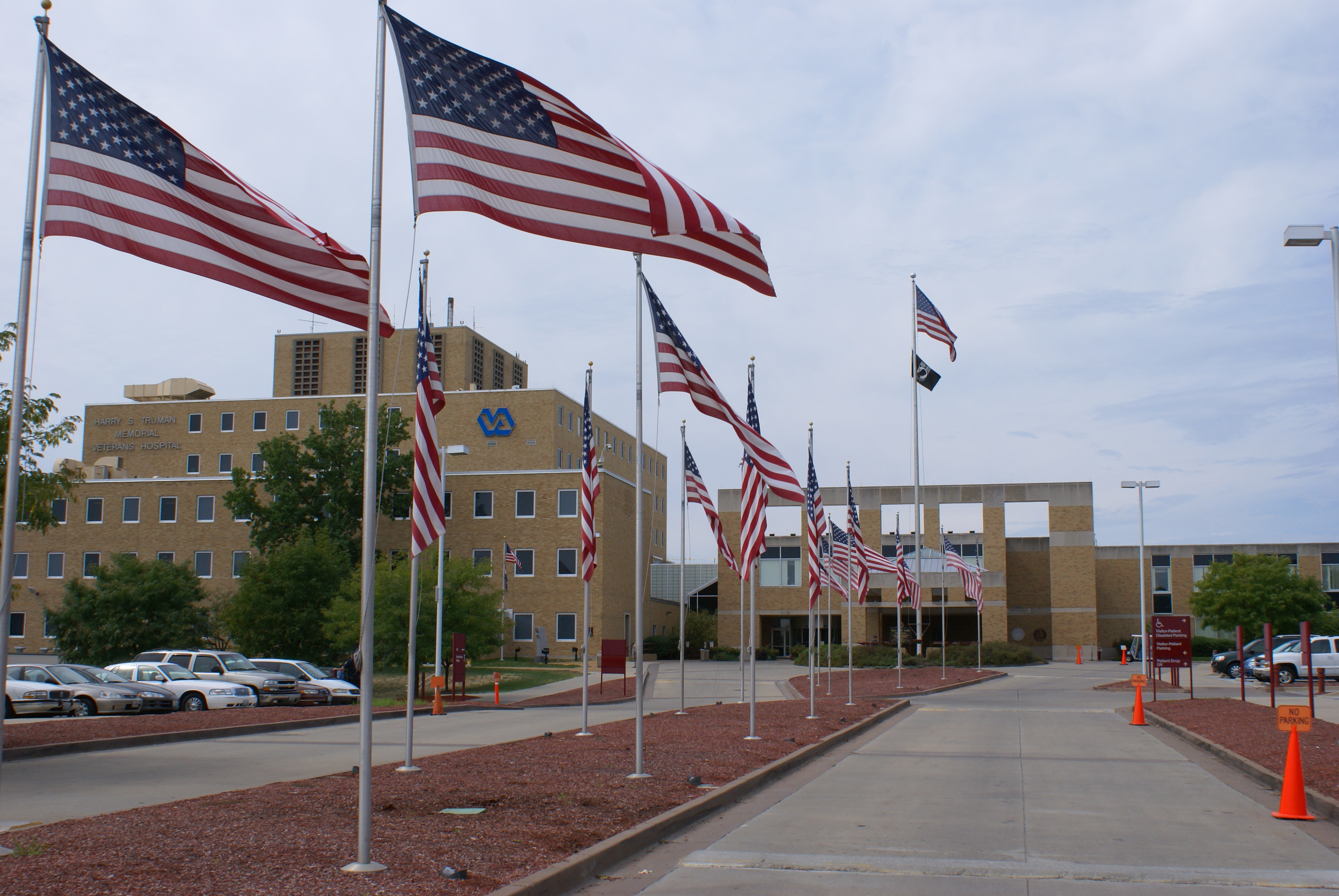

Geography
- Location: Columbia, Boone County, Missouri, United States
- Coordinates: 38°56′12″N 92°19′44″W

Organization
- Care system: Tertiary
- Type: General
- Affiliated university: U.S. Department of Veterans Affairs; University of Missouri School of Medicine

Services
- Beds: 123

History
- Founded: 1972; 54 years ago

Links
- Lists: Hospitals in Missouri

The Harry S. Truman Memorial Veterans' Hospital is a Veterans Administration (VA) hospital located in Columbia, Missouri. Located adjacent to the University of Missouri campus, the hospital has a coverage area of 43 counties in Missouri and Illinois and serves more than 38,000 veterans inpatient and 314,000 veterans outpatient. Affiliated with the University of Missouri School of Medicine, it provides primary care, surgical, mental health, medical, geriatric, transitional, rehabilitative, and hospice services. The medical center has achieved some of the best scores in the state of Missouri for JCAHO Quality Reporting.

== History ==
The hospital was constructed from 1966 to 1972 at a cost of $15 million. In 1975, by an act of Congress, it was legally labeled and titled the Harry S. Truman Memorial Veterans' Hospital, named after former President Harry S. Truman.

Truman VA is the only hospital in the Heartland Network — including Missouri and Kansas as well as parts of Illinois, Indiana, Kentucky, and Arkansas — that has a referral center for open heart surgery. At least 250 heart surgeries per year are performed at the hospital.

In 1995, a new ambulatory care building was built, adding 106,000 square feet (9,800 m^{2}) onto the north side of the hospital. The two-story ambulatory care center was dedicated on March 20, 1998, and cost $15.1 million.

In August 2009, ground was broken on a 27,000-square-foot (2,500 m^{2}), $25 million expansion to add a suite of operating rooms and renovate existing floor space. The new building houses five operating room suites, two dedicated to open heart surgery, two general purpose, and one dedicated to special procedures. The old operating rooms were also to be gutted to house a new post-anesthesia care unit and pre-operation room. The first phase of the project was completed in November 2010, with the entire project completed in mid-2012.

The Truman VA was awarded $8 million in stimulus package funds to replace or renovate existing hospital components, which was completed in 2011.

== Additional facilities ==
The Truman VA maintains eight Community Based Outpatient Clinics (CBOCs) in Waynesville, Kirkville, Mexico, St. James, Osage Beach, Missouri, Jefferson City, Sedalia, and Marshfield, each of which provides access to primary care and mental health services.

== Research program and affiliations ==
The Truman VA is affiliated with the University of Missouri School of Medicine and supports 83 resident doctor positions; it also provides a clinical site for other professions within the health field. In 2009, 52 research projects were active at the VA hospital, and included important areas like diagnostic imaging, cancer therapy, cardiovascular disease, PTSD, traumatic brain injury, geriatrics, pulmonary care, and the development of new radiopharmaceuticals.

The Truman VA participates in the Missouri Arthritis Rehabilitation Research and Training Center (MARRTC), which is the only federally funded arthritis rehabilitation research and training center in the United States. The MARRTC provides research and public awareness regarding arthritis and to improve the quality of life and promote independent living among people with arthritis and arthritic conditions.

The Medical Center also contains the Biomolecular Imaging Center (BIC), which offers VA and affiliated MU researchers, state of the art molecular and anatomic in vivo imaging capabilities.
