= Aullville, Missouri =

- Village
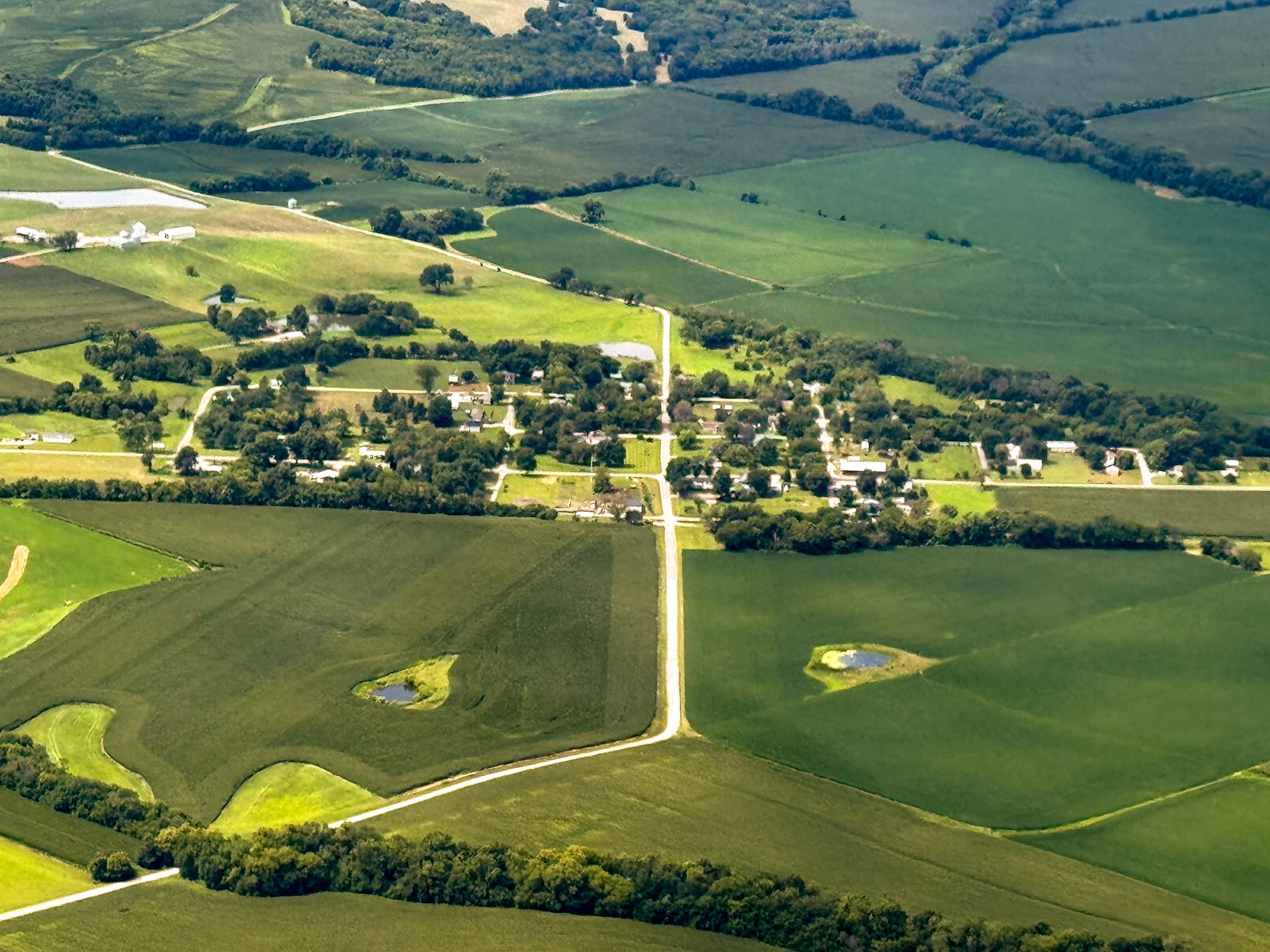

- Location of Aullville, Missouri
- Coordinates: 39°01′03″N 93°40′40″W
- Country: United States
- State: Missouri
- County: Lafayette
- Incorporated: 1905

Area
  - Total: 0.27 sq mi (0.69 km^{2})
  - Land: 0.27 sq mi (0.69 km^{2})
  - Water: 0 sq mi (0.00 km^{2})
- Elevation: 725 ft (221 m)

Population (2020)
  - Total: 77
  - Density: 289.4/sq mi (111.72/km^{2})
- Time zone: UTC-6 (Central (CST))
  - Summer (DST): UTC-5 (CDT)
- ZIP code: 64037
- Area code: 660
- FIPS code: 29-02530
- GNIS feature ID: 2398010

Aullville is a village in Lafayette County, Missouri, and is part of the Kansas City metropolitan area within the United States. The population was 77 at the 2020 census.

== History ==
A post office called Aullville was established in 1871, and remained in operation until 1957. The community was named for John and Robert Aull, members of a family of pioneer settlers.

== Geography ==
According to the United States Census Bureau, the village has a total area of 0.27 square miles (0.70 km^{2}), all land.

== Demographics ==
Historical population
Census	Pop.	Note	%±
1880	280		—
1910	166		—
1920	128		−22.9%
1930	128		0.0%
1940	178		39.1%
1950	123		−30.9%
1960	90		−26.8%
1970	108		20.0%
1980	92		−14.8%
1990	72		−21.7%
2000	86		19.4%
2010	100		16.3%
2020	77		−23.0%
U.S. Decennial Census

=== 2010 census ===
As of the census of 2010, there were 100 people, 36 households, and 26 families living in the village. The population density was 370.4 inhabitants per square mile (143.0/km^{2}). There were 39 housing units at an average density of 144.4 per square mile (55.8/km^{2}). The racial makeup of the village was 99.0% White and 1.0% from two or more races.

There were 36 households, of which 25.0% had children under the age of 18 living with them, 55.6% were married couples living together, 13.9% had a female householder with no husband present, 2.8% had a male householder with no wife present, and 27.8% were non-families. 19.4% of all households were made up of individuals, and 2.8% had someone living alone who was 65 years of age or older. The average household size was 2.78 and the average family size was 3.08.

The median age in the village was 33.5 years. 23% of residents were under the age of 18; 10% were between the ages of 18 and 24; 28% were from 25 to 44; 30% were from 45 to 64; and 9% were 65 years of age or older. The gender makeup of the village was 52.0% male and 48.0% female.

=== 2000 census ===
As of the census of 2000, there were 86 people, 33 households, and 23 families living in the village. The population density was 340.5 inhabitants per square mile (131.5/km^{2}). There were 38 housing units at an average density of 150.5 per square mile (58.1/km^{2}). The racial makeup of the village was 86.05% White, 5.81% African American, 4.65% Native American, and 3.49% from two or more races.

There were 33 households, out of which 33.3% had children under the age of 18 living with them, 54.5% were married couples living together, 6.1% had a female householder with no husband present, and 30.3% were non-families. 24.2% of all households were made up of individuals, and 12.1% had someone living alone who was 65 years of age or older. The average household size was 2.61 and the average family size was 3.09.

In the village the population was spread out, with 27.9% under the age of 18, 10.5% from 18 to 24, 18.6% from 25 to 44, 30.2% from 45 to 64, and 12.8% who were 65 years of age or older. The median age was 40 years. For every 100 females, there were 104.8 males. For every 100 females age 18 and over, there were 113.8 males.

The median income for a household in the village was $33,542, and the median income for a family was $42,500. Males had a median income of $33,750 versus $13,750 for females. The per capita income for the village was $13,339. There were 12.5% of families and 15.2% of the population living below the poverty line, including 13.6%-= of under eighteens and 25.0% of those over 64.

== Education ==
It is in the Concordia R-II School District.

Metropolitan Community College has the Concordia school district area in its service area, but not its in-district taxation area.
