= List of Missouri conservation areas – Central region =

Map of Missouri conservation areas with the Central region highlighted

This list includes Conservation Areas, Wildlife Areas, and other natural places administered under the central administrative region of the Missouri Department of Conservation, including those administered under cooperative agreements with local counties and municipalities.

The Central administrative region of the Missouri Department of Conservation consists of the counties of Audrain, Boone, Callaway, Camden, Cole, Cooper, Gasconade, Howard, Maries, Miller, Montgomery, Moniteau, Morgan, Osage, and Saline. The regional conservation office is in Columbia.

| Conservation Area | Description | Size | | County | Location |
|---|---|---|---|---|---|
| Bagnell Dam Access | This area offers access to the Osage River just below Bagnell Dam which impounds the Lake of the Ozarks. There is a two-lane boat ramp and a picnic area. Popular bank fishing area. | 10 acres | 4.0 ha | Miller | 38°11′59.46″N 92°37′2.16″W |
| Bell Chute Access | This area offers access to the Gasconade River. There is a boat ramp. | 8 acres | 3.2 ha | Maries | 38°4′31.84″N 91°53′23.57″W |
| Ben Branch Lake Conservation Area | This area contains forest and grassland. Facilities and features: boat ramp, picnic area, fishing jetty, and Ben Branch Lake (39 acres). | 584 acres | 236 ha | Osage | 38°34′21.32″N 91°47′18.63″W |
| Bennitt (Rudolf) Conservation Area | This area is largely forest. Facilities/features: primitive camping, firearms range, 48-acre (190,000 m^{2}) lake, and 2 intermittent streams (Little Perche Creek, Perche Creek). | 3,562 acres | 1,441 ha | Randolph, Howard, Boone | 39°15′41.76″N 92°26′59.82″W |
| Big Buffalo Creek Conservation Area | The area is mostly forest. Facilities/features: primitive camping, three interconnected hiking trails, Big Buffalo Lake (5 acres), three springs and two permanent streams (Big Buffalo Creek and Pole Hollow Creek). There is one Natural Area: Big Buffalo Fen Natural Area. | 1,565 acres | 633 ha | Morgan, Benton | 38°20′35.29″N 93°4′45.28″W |
| Binder Lake | The Department of Conservation and Jefferson City Parks and Recreation cooperate to provide Binder Lake (155 acres). Facilities/features: a boat ramp, two docks, a disabled-accessible fishing jetty, restroom, and a shorebird viewing area. | 133 acres | 54 ha | Cole | 38°35′36.38″N 92°18′21.07″W |
| Blackwater Bridge Access | This area offers access to the Blackwater River. There is a boat ramp. | 4 acres | 1.6 ha | Cooper | 38°58′59.29″N 92°59′16.53″W |
| Blind Pony Lake Conservation Area | This area contains old fields, cropland, forest, and some prairies. | 2,195 acres | 888 ha | Saline | 39°3′8.84″N 93°21′9.84″W |
| Blue Lick Conservation Area | This cropland and forest area features several saline and mineral springs and one permanent stream (Blackwater River). | 373 acres | 151 ha | Saline | 38°59′54.30″N 93°13′19.01″W |
| Bonnots Mill Access | This area offers access to the Osage and Missouri Rivers. There is a concrete boat ramp. | 5 acres | 2.0 ha | Osage | 38°34′26.53″N 91°58′22.23″W |
| Branch Towersite | This area is mostly forest. There is a small wildlife water hole. The fire tower is not open to the public. There is a privy that is maintained on site. | 38 acres | 15 ha | Camden | 37°54′5.11″N 93°0′6.31″W |
| Brays Access | Access requires a 0.25-mile (0.40 km) hike down a steep grade (no trail). | 29 acres | 12 ha | Miller | 38°6′52.51″N 92°15′27.44″W |
| Brown Bend Access | Facilities/features: boat dock, two fishing jetties, and access to the Lake of the Ozarks. | 5 acres | 2.0 ha | Camden | 38°12′49.08″N 93°1′43.46″W |
| Bruns (Dr Bernard) Access | There are several diverse plant communities on this small conservation area. There are 2 fields of native grass/native forbs planted on the upland. The north facing hillside is old field grown up in trees and has the structure of a closed woodland. | 84 acres | 34 ha | Osage | 38°27′15.02″N 91°58′8.43″W |
| Camdenton Conservation Service Center | Closed to hunting. | 45 acres | 18 ha | Camden | 38°1′25.47″N 92°46′59.38″W |
| Canaan Conservation Area | This area is mostly forest. Facilities/features: primitive camping, two intermittent streams, and two small ponds (1 acre total). | 1,437 acres | 582 ha | Gasconade | 38°20′16.69″N 91°35′54.70″W |
| Carpenter Memorial Conservation Area | This is a forest area adjacent to part of the Lake of the Ozarks. There are no trails. The only road is Possum Trot Hollow Road. Intermittent stream is Roberts Branch. | 365 acres | 148 ha | Morgan | 38°16′54.10″N 93°4′24.45″W |
| Chamois Access | This area offers access to the Missouri River. | 0.1 acres | 0.040 ha | Osage | 38°40′51.40″N 91°46′23.34″W |
| Clifty Creek Conservation Area | This forest and woodland tract contains high bluffs and a natural rock bridge over a scenic Ozark stream. | 249 acres | 101 ha | Maries | 38°1′51.21″N 91°59′11.06″W |
| Clifty Creek Natural Area | This forest and woodland tract contains high bluffs and a natural rock bridge over a scenic Ozark stream. | 249 acres | 101 ha | Maries | 38°2′16.06″N 91°58′35.60″W |
| Coffman Beach Access | This area offers access to the Lake of the Ozarks. Facilities/features: a 4-lane boat ramp, courtesy dock, picnic area, and fishing dock. | 9 acres | 3.6 ha | Morgan | 38°15′13.49″N 92°44′7.74″W |
| Cooper Hill Conservation Area | This area contains forest, grassland, cropland and old fields. Facilities/features: boat ramp, permanent stream (Gasconade River). | 219 acres | 89 ha | Osage | 38°25′49.01″N 91°39′47.46″W |
| Danville Conservation Area | This area features woodlands, glades, and ridges formed from creek tributaries. This area also includes the Danville Glades Natural Area which takes up 361 acres (146 ha), and features a large limestone glade complex. | 3,135.8 acres | 1,269.0 ha | Montgomery | 38.865519°N 91.504799°W |
| Davisdale Conservation Area | This area is more than half forest. It also contains loess hills, cropland, old fields, grassland and prairie. Facilities/features: primitive camping and 16 fishable ponds (17.5 acres total). | 2,783 acres | 1,126 ha | Howard | 39°0′45.75″N 92°37′37.53″W |
| De Bourgmont Access | This area offers access to the Lamine River. There is a boat ramp. | 3 acres | 1.2 ha | Cooper | 38°56′29.55″N 92°52′18.68″W |
| Diana Bend Conservation Area | This area is more than half wetlands and also contains forest, old fields, and cropland. Facilities/ features: primitive camping, fishable pond/blew holes, Missouri River frontage within hiking distance. | 1,340 acres | 540 ha | Howard | 38°58′37.77″N 92°35′56.19″W |
| Diggs (Marshall I) Conservation Area | This area is more than half forest and also contains cropland, old fields, grassland, savanna and prairie. Facilities/features: boat ramp, picnic area, pavilion, and two fishable lakes (Lake Walter and Lake Whitesell). | 1,032 acres | 418 ha | Montgomery, Audrain | 39°4′24.33″N 91°37′44.12″W |
| Eagle Bluffs Conservation Area | This area, which borders Katy Trail State Park, contains cropland, forest, wetlands, and smaller tracts of savanna and glades. Facilities/features: viewing blind, waterfowl blind, and two permanent streams (Missouri River, Perche Creek). | 4,593 acres | 1,859 ha | Boone | 38°51′19.56″N 92°26′3.02″W |
| Earthquake Hollow Conservation Area | This area contains forest and old fields. | 83 acres | 34 ha | Callaway | 38°41′47.01″N 92°3′23.75″W |
| Fiery Fork Conservation Area | This area is mostly forest. Facilities/features: primitive camping, picnic areas, and two permanent streams (Little Niangua River, Fiery Fork Creek). | 1,580 acres | 640 ha | Camden | 38°4′47.25″N 92°56′40.22″W |
| Franklin Island Conservation Area | This area contains forest, old fields, cropland and wetlands. There are two permanent streams (Bonne Femme Creek, Missouri River). | 1,663 acres | 673 ha | Howard | 38°59′23.47″N 92°41′45.28″W |
| Fredericksburg Ferry Access | This area offers access to the Gasconade River. There is a boat ramp. | 7 acres | 2.8 ha | Gasconade | 38°36′9.99″N 91°37′59.77″W |
| Freeburg Towersite | This wooded site has a fire tower. | 12 acres | 4.9 ha | Maries | 38°16′11.00″N 91°56′27.82″W |
| Gale (Larry R) Access | This area is mostly forest with some old fields and glades. Facilities/features: a 2-lane boat ramp, a courtesy dock, a fishing dock, and access to the Niangua Arm of Lake of the Ozarks. | 214 acres | 87 ha | Camden | 38°1′22.11″N 92°50′3.32″W |
| Gasconade Park Access | This area is about a half-mile from the confluence of the Gasconade and Missouri rivers. There is a boat ramp. | 2 acres | 0.81 ha | Gasconade | 38°40′5.53″N 91°33′19.96″W |
| Grand Bluffs Conservation Area | This area is mostly forest and also contains savanna, prairie and glades. Facilities/features: Grand Bluffs Scenic Overlook Trail (2 miles) leads users through maple/oak forest and prairie to an observation deck on the bluffs. | 218 acres | 88 ha | Montgomery | 38°42′37.59″N 91°37′0.23″W |
| Grand Pass Conservation Area | This area is largely wetlands and cropland with 800 acres (3.2 km^{2}) of forest. | 5,123 acres | 2,073 ha | Saline | 39°17′36.02″N 93°19′1.68″W |
| Gravois Mills Access | This area is mostly forest and offers access to the Lake of the Ozarks. Facilities/features: 2-lane boat ramp, courtesy dock, picnic area, and covered fishing dock. | 58 acres | 23 ha | Morgan | 38°18′33.57″N 92°49′9.83″W |
| Hams Prairie Access | This is a forest area offering access to Auxvasse Creek. | 22 acres | 8.9 ha | Callaway | 38°45′38.49″N 91°50′16.77″W |
| Harriman Hill Access | This area offers access to the Lamine River. There is a boat ramp. | 38 acres | 15 ha | Cooper | 38°56′9.91″N 92°56′45.09″W |
| Hart Creek Conservation Area | This area is mostly forest. Facilities/features: fishable pond (5 acres) and 2 permanent streams. | 659 acres | 267 ha | Boone | 38°42′35.88″N 92°19′21.88″W |
| Hartsburg Access | This area offers access to the Missouri River. There is a boat ramp. | 36 acres | 15 ha | Boone | 38°42′26.25″N 92°20′23.50″W |
| Helds Island Access | This area contains old fields. Facilities/features: boat ramp, primitive camping, and a permanent stream (Gasconade River). | 11 acres | 4.5 ha | Gasconade | 38°33′10.58″N 91°35′58.03″W |
| Hinkson Woods Conservation Area | It contains forest, old fields, and grassland. Facilities/features: permanent stream (Hinkson Creek). | 81 acres | 33 ha | Boone | 38°55′30.79″N 92°23′8.94″W |
| Hite Prairie Conservation Area | This prairie is noted for its wildflowers. | 101 acres | 41 ha | Morgan | 38°25′18.69″N 92°51′43.82″W |
| Honey Creek Access | Facilities/features: boat ramp, primitive camping, intermittent stream (Honey Creek), and a permanent stream (Moreau River). | 74 acres | 30 ha | Cole | 38°29′26.53″N 92°14′18.60″W |
| Hungry Mother Conservation Area | This is a forest area with primitive camping. | 270 acres | 110 ha | Howard | 39°14′9.21″N 92°33′25.32″W |
| Kings Bluff Access | This area offers access to the Osage River. There is a boat ramp. | 6 acres | 2.4 ha | Miller | 38°16′39.66″N 92°23′14.09″W |
| Lamine River Conservation Area | This 5,977-acre (24.19 km^{2}) area has a unique combination of river, floodplain, rolling uplands, and steep river bluffs. The Lamine River is a signature feature of the area meandering through bottomlands of forest, cropfields, oldfields, and small wetlands. | 5,985 acres | 2,422 ha | Cooper, Morgan | 38°42′47.17″N 92°58′38.77″W |
| Lick Creek Conservation Area | Facilities/features: boat ramp, fishable lake (12 acres), and intermittent stream (Lick Creek). | 299 acres | 121 ha | Boone | 39°8′59.03″N 92°22′59.47″W |
| Little Dixie Lake Conservation Area | This area is primarily forest and grassland. Facilities/features: boat ramp, boat rentals, boat dock, picnic areas and a pavilion, nine fishing jetties, a fishing dock, and Little Dixie Lake (205 acres). | 745 acres | 301 ha | Callaway | 38°54′46.92″N 92°7′17.18″W |
| Loutre Lick Access | This forest, cropland, and old fields area offers access to the Loutre River. | 146 acres | 59 ha | Montgomery | 38°52′39.24″N 91°35′7.15″W |
| Lowe (William) Conservation Area | South of Mexico, go .50-mile (80 km) east of Business Highway 54 on Teal Lake Road to area. | 133 acres | 54 ha | Audrain | 39°8′47.33″N 91°52′45.28″W |
| Madden Ford Access | This area of old fields and forest offers access to Tavern Creek. | 158 acres | 64 ha | Miller | 38°2′56.00″N 92°18′50.78″W |
| Malta Bend Lake | This is a fishable, 5-acre (20,000 m^{2}) lake surrounded by old fields and forest. | 24 acres | 9.7 ha | Saline | 39°10′31.62″N 93°23′13.56″W |
| Manito Lake Conservation Area | Manito is uplands fields divided by brushy fencelines and drainages, and woodlands that surround the lake. The 77-acre (310,000 m^{2}), Manito Lake, is a predominant feature of the area. The lake has accommodations for shoreline fishing, disabled access parking and fishing. | 867 acres | 351 ha | Moniteau, Morgan | 38°35′6.22″N 92°48′15.83″W |
| Mansfield (Alice Ahart) Conservation Area | Forest area with a 0.75-mile (1.21 km) loop hiking trail. | 81 acres | 33 ha | Camden | 38°8′21.25″N 92°42′51.85″W |
| Mari-Osa Access | Facilities/features: boat ramp, primitive camping, and permanent stream (Osage River). | 28 acres | 11 ha | Cole | 38°29′30.39″N 92°0′50.46″W |
| Marion Access | This is a forest area. Facilities/features: boat ramp, primitive camping, and two permanent streams (Moniteau Creek, Missouri River). | 4 acres | 1.6 ha | Cole | 38°41′29.83″N 92°21′56.25″W |
| Marion Bottoms Conservation Area | This area contains forest, wetlands, and old fields. Facilities/features: primitive camping, fishable lakes, and ponds (75 acres total), and two permanent streams (Moniteau Creek, Missouri River). | 2,941 acres | 1,190 ha | Cole, Moniteau | 38°42′56.47″N 92°22′19.26″W |
| Marshall Junction Conservation Area | This is a mostly forest area with old fields and cropland. Facilities/features: firearms range, fishable pond (.25 acre), and a permanent stream (Blackwater River). | 778 acres | 315 ha | Saline, Pettis | 38°56′44.46″N 93°15′35.71″W |
| McAllister Springs Access | This area offers access to the Blackwater River. There is a boat ramp. | 6 acres | 2.4 ha | Saline | 38°57′2.26″N 93°20′51.29″W |
| Miami Access | There is a boat ramp. | 5 acres | 2.0 ha | Saline | 39°19′30.70″N 93°13′46.20″W |
| Mint Spring Access | Offers access to the Bourbeuse River. | 7 acres | 2.8 ha | Crawford, Gasconade | 38°12′30.83″N 91°32′4.94″W |
| Mint Spring Conservation Area | This small forest contains Mint Spring Seep Natural Area. | 43 acres | 17 ha | Gasconade | 38°12′17.72″N 91°32′14.23″W |
| Mokane Access | This area offers access to the Missouri River. There is a boat ramp. | 10 acres | 4.0 ha | Callaway | 38°39′13.36″N 91°53′4.37″W |
| Moniteau Creek Conservation Area | This area contains forest, old fields, cropland, pasture, wetlands and prairie. Facilities/features: primitive camping, 2-acre (8,100 m^{2}) pond open to fishing, and a permanent stream (Moniteau Creek). | 753 acres | 305 ha | Howard | 39°5′41.50″N 92°35′10.02″W |
| Moores Mill Access | This area contains old fields and forest and offers access to Auxvasse Creek. | 104 acres | 42 ha | Callaway | 38°54′38.29″N 91°48′48.25″W |
| Moreau 50 Access | This is a forested area. Facilities/features: boat ramp, permanent stream (Moreau River). Camping is not permitted; there is a private campground nearby. | 10 acres | 4.0 ha | Cole | 38°32′30.28″N 92°6′23.53″W |
| Northcutt (Clarence L) Memorial Conservation Area | This is an 80-acre (320,000 m^{2}) forest. | 81 acres | 33 ha | Audrain | 39°13′3.03″N 92°1′8.02″W |
| Osage-Tavern Access | This area offers a one-lane boat ramp with access to the Osage River and lower Big Tavern Creek. | 27 acres | 11 ha | Miller | 38°19′1.92″N 92°17′19.68″W |
| Painted Rock Conservation Area | This area is predominantly forest. Facilities/features: trail, viewing decks, fishable lake with jetties (5 acres) and permanent stream (Osage River). | 1,487 acres | 602 ha | Osage | 38°23′58.92″N 92°6′30.72″W |
| Paydown Access | This area offers access to the Gasconade River. There is a boat ramp. | 7 acres | 2.8 ha | Maries | 38°13′49.81″N 91°48′51.96″W |
| Perry (Ralph and Martha) Memorial Conservation Area | This area contains forest, old fields, wetlands, cropland, and grassland. Facilities/features: primitive camping, firearms range, fishable ponds, and a permanent stream. | 4,179 acres | 1,691 ha | Saline, Johnson, Pettis | 38°55′4.85″N 93°30′53.23″W |
| Pikes Camp Access | This area consists of forest and cropland along the Osage River. Facilities/features: boat ramp, permanent stream. | 150 acres | 61 ha | Cole | 38°27′51.59″N 92°10′12.42″W |
| Plowboy Bend Conservation Area | The tract runs along 5 miles (8.0 km) of the Missouri River and has bottomlands, bluffs and scour holes. | 2,677 acres | 1,083 ha | Moniteau | 38°47′58.81″N 92°24′19.90″W |
| Pointers Creek Access | This area offers access to the Gasconade River. There is a boat ramp. | 9 acres | 3.6 ha | Osage | 38°25′30.77″N 91°44′38.17″W |
| Prairie Home Conservation Area | This area contains forest, old fields, cropland, prairie and glades. Facilities/features: boat dock, primitive camping, 13 ponds and lakes (40 acres total), intermittent stream (Schaaf Creek). | 1,467 acres | 594 ha | Moniteau, Cooper | 38°46′14.50″N 92°35′1.56″W |
| Proctor Towersite | Forest area. | 112 acres | 45 ha | Morgan | 38°17′4.18″N 92°55′15.20″W |
| Providence Access | This area is adjacent to the Katy Trail and offers access to Perche Creek which flows into the Missouri River 1.25 miles (2.01 km) downstream. There is a boat ramp and privy. | 6 acres | 2.4 ha | Boone | 38°50′12.04″N 92°24′22.89″W |
| Reform Conservation Area | This area contains forest, cropland, grassland and old fields. Area is leased from Ameren-UE and surrounds the Callaway Nuclear Facility. Facilities/features: 4 fishable ponds (15.5 acres), intermittent streams and a permanent stream (Logan Creek). | 7,188 acres | 2,909 ha | Callaway | 38°45′33.93″N 91°47′2.37″W |
| Rinquelin Trail Lake Conservation Area | This area contains forest and old fields. Facilities/features: boat ramp, primitive camping, fishing jetties, and Rinquelin Trail Community Lake. | 282 acres | 114 ha | Maries | 38°5′1.58″N 92°9′35.96″W |
| Roberts Bluff Access | Facilities/features: boat ramp, primitive camping, permanent stream (Lamine River). | 6 acres | 2.4 ha | Cooper | 38°55′18.52″N 92°58′51.74″W |
| Rocky Fork Lakes Conservation Area | This area is forest mixed with old fields, grassland, and savanna. Facilities/features: 20 fishable lakes and ponds (300 acres total). Rocky Fork Lake (52 acres) has a concrete boat ramp. | 2,242 acres | 907 ha | Boone | 39°4′33.04″N 92°18′4.16″W |
| Rocky Mount Towersite | This is a forest area. | 50 acres | 20 ha | Miller | 38°19′23.09″N 92°37′45.82″W |
| Rollins Ferry Access | This area offers access to the Gasconade River. There is a boat ramp. | 16 acres | 6.5 ha | Osage | 38°23′32.39″N 91°49′17.33″W |
| Saline Valley Conservation Area | This area is mostly forest. Facilities/features: a few fishable ponds and five permanent streams (Jack Buster Creek, Big Saline Creek, Little Saline Creek, Jim Henry Creek, and the Osage River). | 4,940 acres | 2,000 ha | Miller | 38°17′20.91″N 92°26′30.02″W |
| Scrivner Road Conservation Area | This area is mostly old fields with forest and cropland. Facilities/features: primitive camping, Winegar Lake (9 acres), permanent stream (South Moreau Creek). | 923 acres | 374 ha | Cole | 38°28′44.77″N 92°22′58.43″W |
| Sears (F O and Leda J) Memorial Wildlife Area | A large percentage of this area is planted as native prairie. | 162 acres | 66 ha | Audrain | 39°15′44.42″N 91°43′1.60″W |
| Shawnee Bend Access | Facilities/features: four-lane boat ramp, two courtesy docks and one fishing dock access to the Lake of the Ozarks. | 7 acres | 2.8 ha | Camden | 38°10′20.19″N 92°43′56.78″W |
| Smith (Roger V and Viola Wachal) Conservation Area | This area is mostly forest with an intermittent stream (Turtle Branch). | 484 acres | 196 ha | Cole, Moniteau | 38°39′29.20″N 92°25′33.81″W |
| Smoky Waters Conservation Area | This is a forest area. Facilities/features: historic area (Dodds Island), two permanent streams (Missouri River, Osage River). | 1,073 acres | 434 ha | Cole, Osage | 38°34′33.44″N 91°59′32.70″W |
| Spring Creek Gap Conservation Area | This area is mostly woodlands and glades. Facilities/features: primitive camping, open vistas, and Spring Creek Gap Glades Natural Area. | 1,783 acres | 722 ha | Maries | 38°8′50.51″N 91°48′7.76″W |
| St Thomas Ferry Access | The area offers access to the Osage River. There is a boat ramp. | 1.0 acre | 0.40 ha | Cole | 38°25′19.71″N 92°12′28.76″W |
| Stringtown Bridge Access | This is a forest area bordering the North Moreau Creek. | 47 acres | 19 ha | Cole | 38°32′18.53″N 92°19′27.23″W |
| Stump Island Park Access | Facilities/features: primitive camping, picnic area and pavilion, permanent stream (Missouri River) with a concrete boat ramp. | 8 acres | 3.2 ha | Howard | 39°13′12.06″N 92°50′52.94″W |
| Swinging Bridge Access | This forest and old fields area offers access to the Lamine River. There is a boat ramp. | 17 acres | 6.9 ha | Cooper | 38°49′32.72″N 93°1′52.45″W |
| Taylors Landing Access | Facilities/Features: Missouri River access via a concrete boat ramp. | 13 acres | 5.3 ha | Cooper | 38°57′35.19″N 92°32′53.19″W |
| Tea Access | This area offers access to the Bourbeuse River. There is no boat ramp. | 5 acres | 2.0 ha | Gasconade | 38°17′58.12″N 91°23′52.33″W |
| Three Creeks Conservation Area | This area is predominantly forest. Many of the old fields containing mainly non-native species are being converted to native warm season grasses and wildflowers. Facilities/features: primitive camping, hiking, bicycle/horse trails, three intermittent streams. | 1,509 acres | 611 ha | Boone | 38°50′29.19″N 92°17′17.87″W |
| Tipton Park Lake | Facilities include paved walking trail, restrooms, pavilions, playground, basketball court, horseshoe pits, baseball field, parking lots, barbecue pits and picnic tables. | 6 acres | 2.4 ha | Moniteau | 37°38′43.8″N 92°46′43.8″W |
| Toronto Springs Conservation Area | This area is mostly forest and grassland. Facilities/features: picnic area, permanent stream (Wet Glaize Creek). | 575 acres | 233 ha | Camden | 37°59′57.12″N 92°30′54.14″W |
| Tri-City Lake | This area includes 60 acres (240,000 m^{2}) of forest. Facilities/features: boat ramp, improved camping, picnic areas, fishable lake (27 acres). | 103 acres | 42 ha | Boone | 39°11′37.87″N 92°12′25.44″W |
| Tuscumbia Access | This area offers access to the Osage River. There is a one-lane, concrete boat ramp. | 1.1 acres | 0.45 ha | Miller | 38°13′56.48″N 92°27′32.27″W |
| Vandalia Lake | The land around the lake is mainly woods and old fields. Facilities/features: boat ramp, improved camping, picnic areas and pavilion, Vandalia Community Lake (44 acres). | 149 acres | 60 ha | Audrain | 39°14′21.35″N 91°32′5.31″W |
| Waters (Henry Jackson) and C B Moss Memorial WA | This area is mostly forest with some grassland. Facilities/features: intermittent stream (Grindstone Creek, which features 75-foot (23 m)-high limestone bluffs). | 110 acres | 45 ha | Boone | 38°55′40.05″N 92°18′32.61″W |
| Wellsville Lake Conservation Area | This area is mostly forest with some old fields. Facilities/features: boat ramp, unstaffed shooting range, Wellsville Lake (14 acres). | 130 acres | 53 ha | Montgomery | 39°2′7.41″N 91°34′32.70″W |
| Whetstone Creek Conservation Area | This area is more than 1/2 forest and woodland with grassland, savanna, cropland, old fields, prairie, and small ephemeral wetlands. Facilities/features: boat ramp, primitive camping, picnic areas, 16 fishable lakes and ponds (65 acres), and an unstaffed shooting range. | 5,244 acres | 2,122 ha | Callaway | 38°57′51.42″N 91°42′56.53″W |
| White (Robert M II) Conservation Area | The area is largely forest with cropland, old fields, grassland, and prairie. Facilities/features: 2 permanent streams and 2 lakes (18 acres total). | 1,163 acres | 471 ha | Monroe, Audrain | 39°20′4.96″N 91°51′49.30″W |
| Wigwam School Access | Seventy-eight acres with walk-in bank fishing, boat ramp and disabled accessible fishing. | 75 acres | 30 ha | Morgan | 38°14′29.17″N 93°0′30.61″W |
| Wilson Camp Access | This area offers access to Tavern Creek. | 157 acres | 64 ha | Miller | 38°10′44.71″N 92°19′11.57″W |

== Notes ==
- Acreage and counties from MDCLand GIS file
- Names, descriptions, and locations from Conservation Atlas Online GIS file
