= The Big Tree =

Large oak tree in Missouri, United States

Coordinates: 38°53′57.52″N 92°27′52.57″W

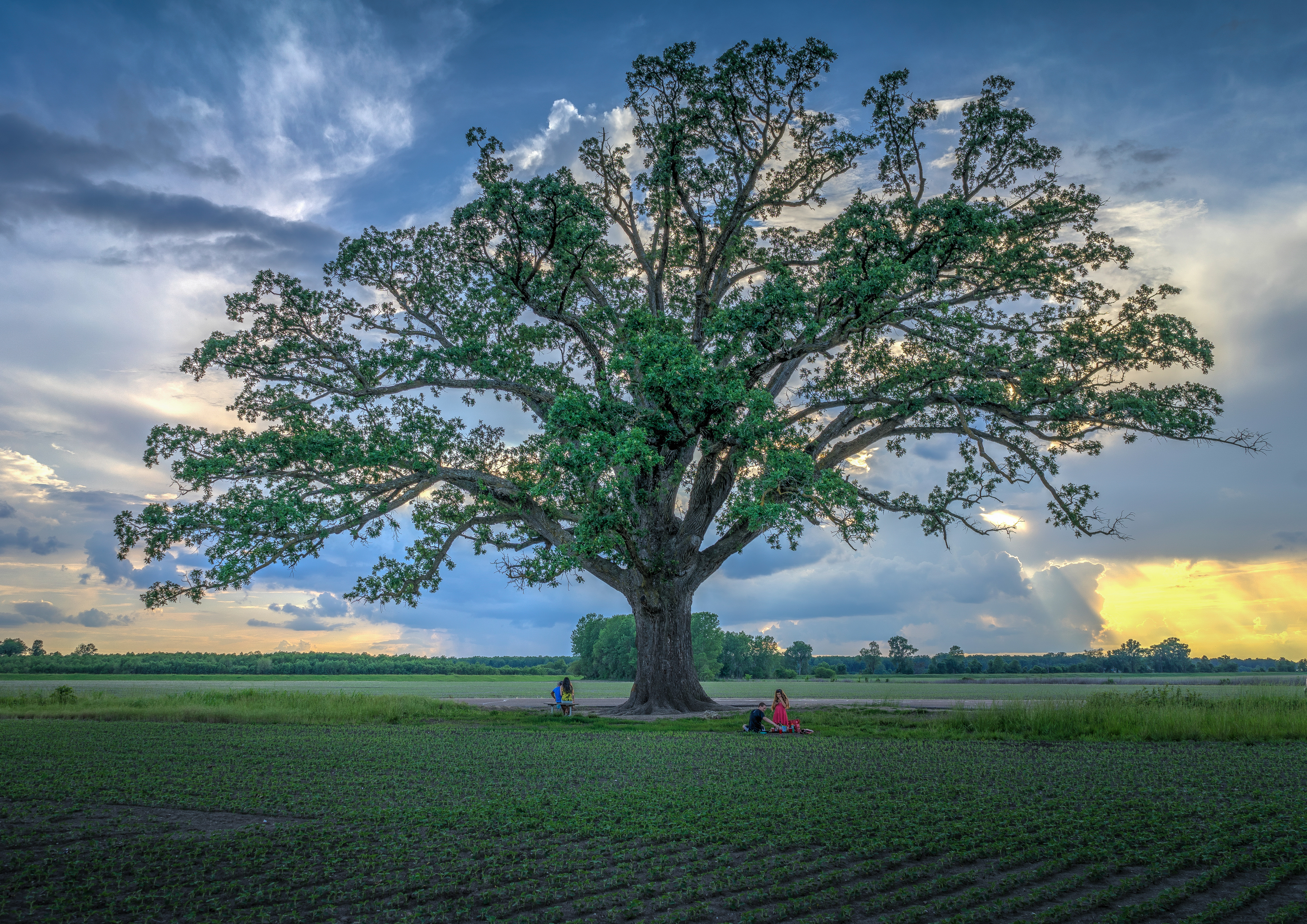
The Big Tree in spring 2016

The Big Tree is a nearly 400-year-old burr oak (Quercus macrocarpa) tree near the Missouri River in Boone County, Missouri. It is tied for National Champion, representing the largest tree of its species in the United States. Standing alone in the floodplain of the Missouri River, and near the city of Columbia, Missouri, it is a well-known landmark and has inspired artists, folklorists, photographers, and nature lovers for hundreds of years. The tree stands 27 m (89 ft) high, has a crown 40 m (130 ft) wide, and a trunk 7.5 ft (2.3 m) in diameter.

The land on which the tree grows is private, and has been farmed by the Williamson family for six generations, although it is publicly accessible by Bur Oak Road. The Katy Trail State Park, a popular rail trail, is just yards from the tree, making it a common side-trip for cyclists. The small village of McBaine is within sight of the tree, and the village of Huntsdale is nearby. It is part of the Lewis and Clark National Historic Trail. The Big Tree was cloned by scientists at the University of Missouri and many offspring from both clones and acorns are growing in front yards, city parks, and schoolyards around Missouri and beyond.

== History ==
According to the U.S. Department of the Interior, the Big Tree is somewhere between 350 and 400 years old, having sprouted sometime in the 1600s. The tree was already around 200 years old when the Lewis and Clark Expedition passed nearby. The size of the tree has made coring and accurate dating difficult. It has been the state champion Bur Oak since 1987.

The tree has survived many droughts and floods, including the Great Flood of 1993, when water stood nearly 6.5 ft deep around its trunk. Lightning has struck the tree often, including in October 2020, when a strike lit a fire in the core, burning out a large space inside the tree. The fire was widely reported by the press and also attracted much community concern. The Boone County Fire Department arrived quickly and extinguished the blaze with great effort. Irrespective of the fire, the tree had been in decline for several years, due to age, drought, and flooding.

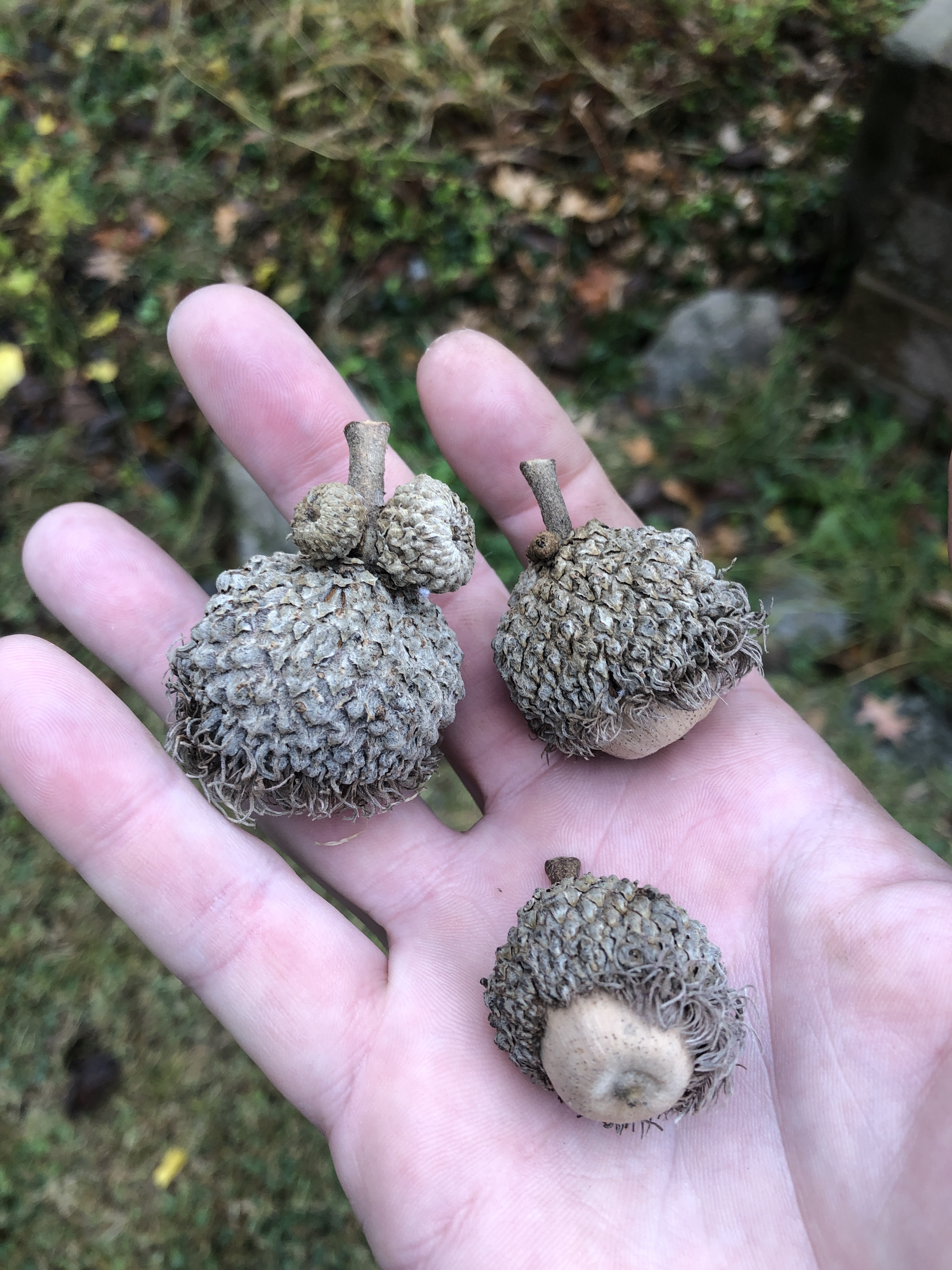
Acorns from the Big Tree

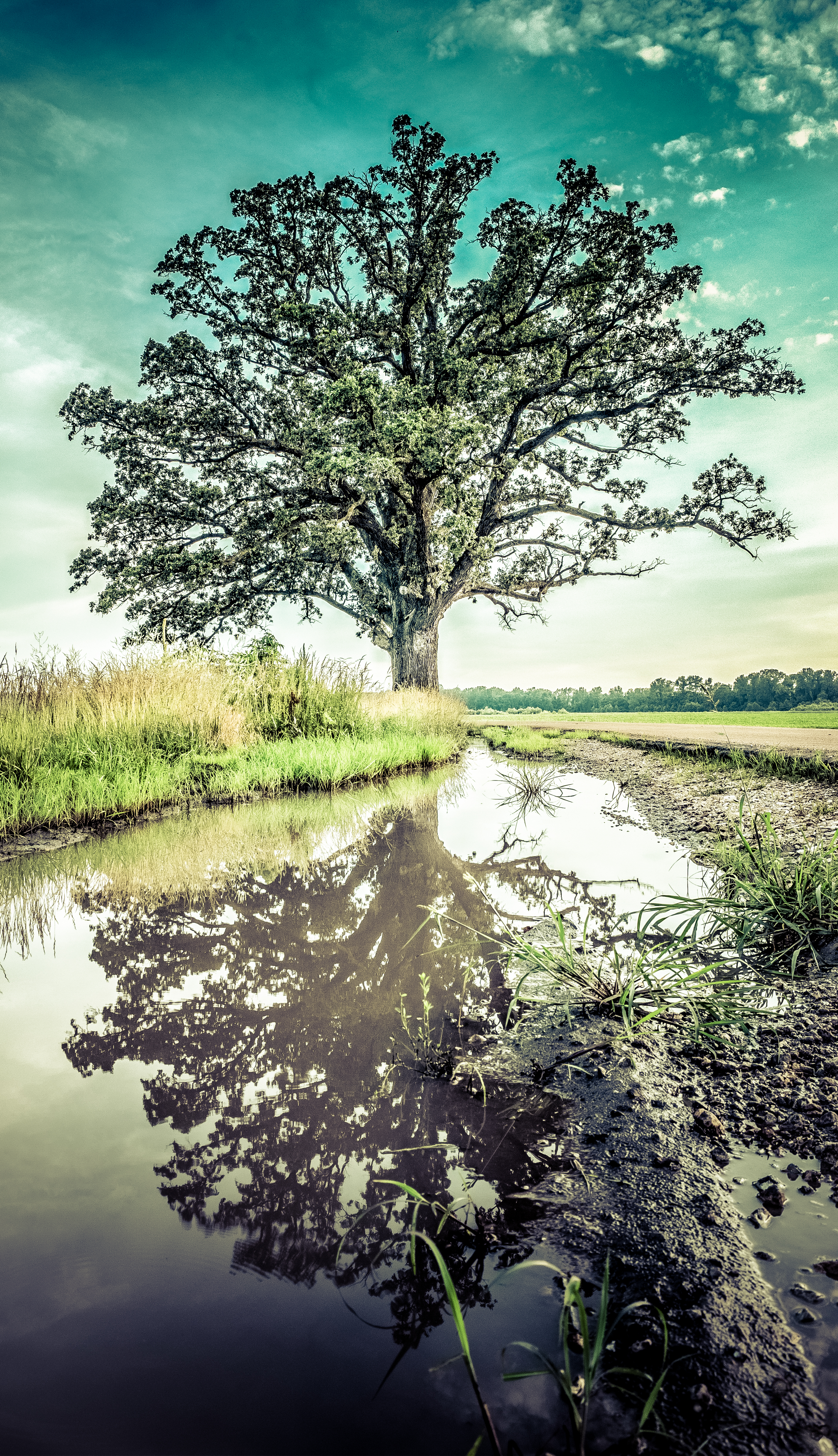
Reflection

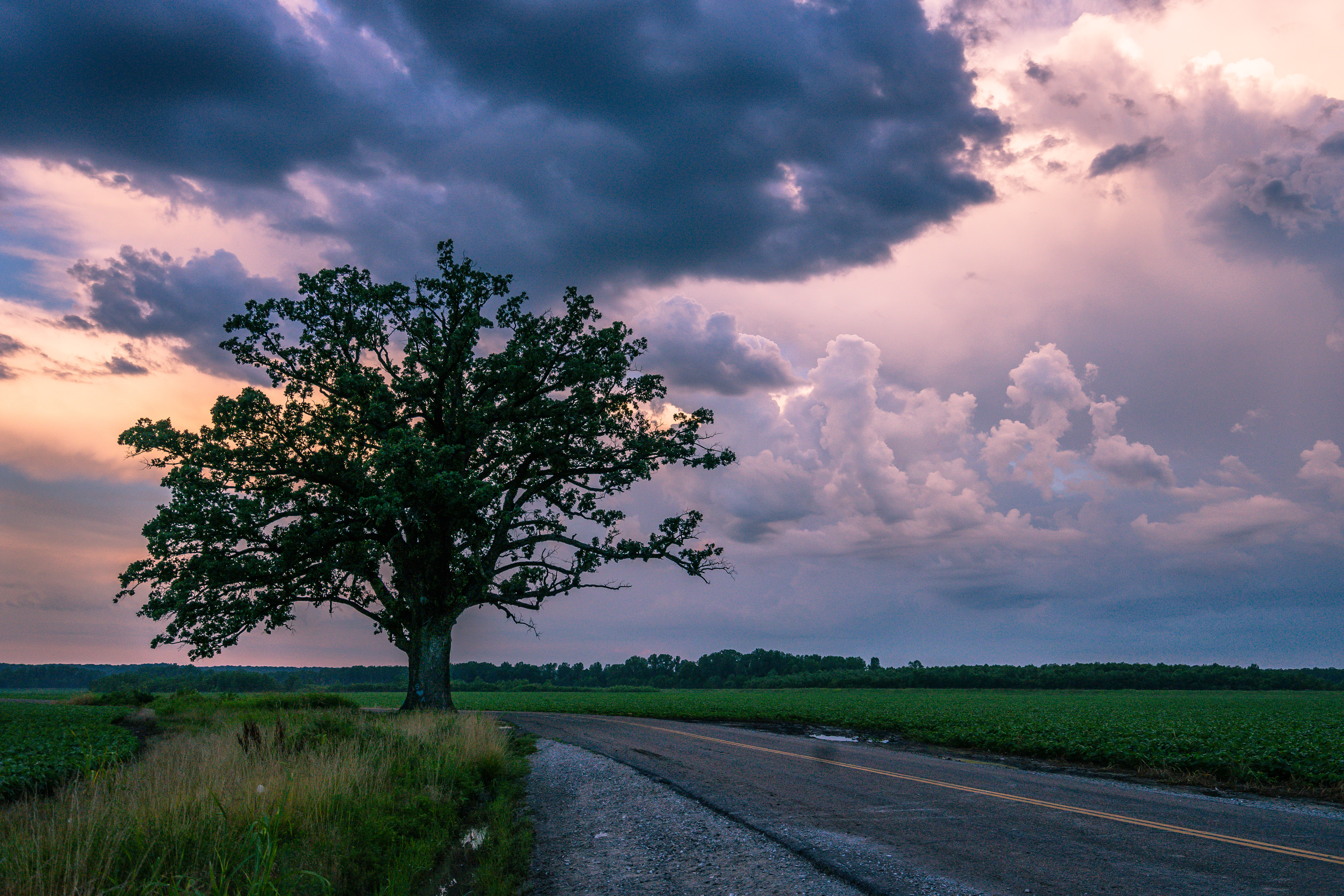
Morning

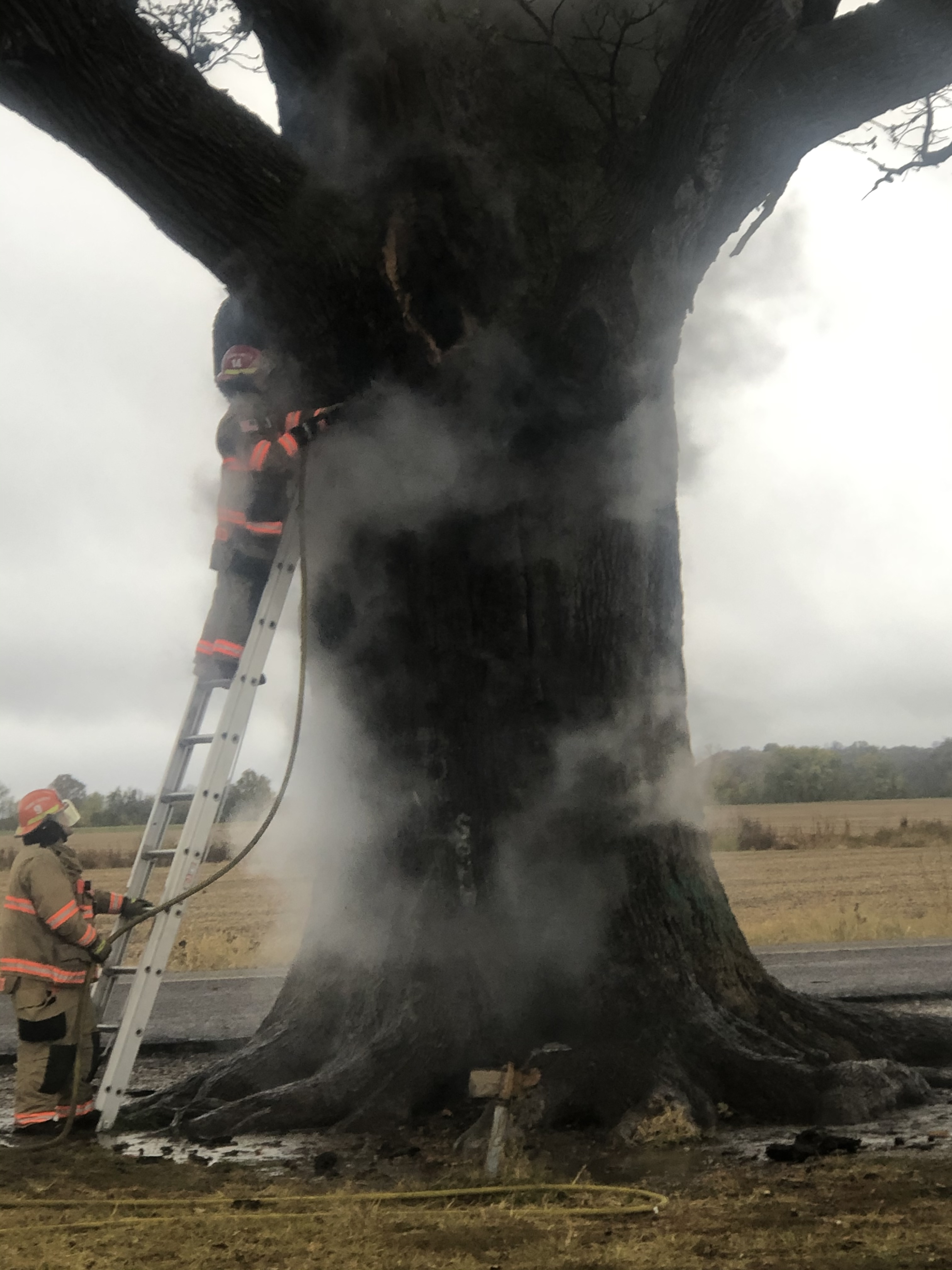
Firefighters work to extinguish a fire inside the Big Tree in 2020

== Fire ==
On October 23, 2020, the Big Tree was struck by lightning directly. The Boone County Fire Department got a call at around 9:30 a.m. when lightning struck the tree and it started smoking. The Boone County Firefighters drilled holes into the tree, and used biodegradable foam to put out the fire from inside the tree. After the fire was put out, tree experts analyzed the tree and concluded that the tree is likely to survive.

== See also ==
- Eagle Bluffs Conservation Area
- Big Muddy National Fish and Wildlife Refuge
- List of individual trees
