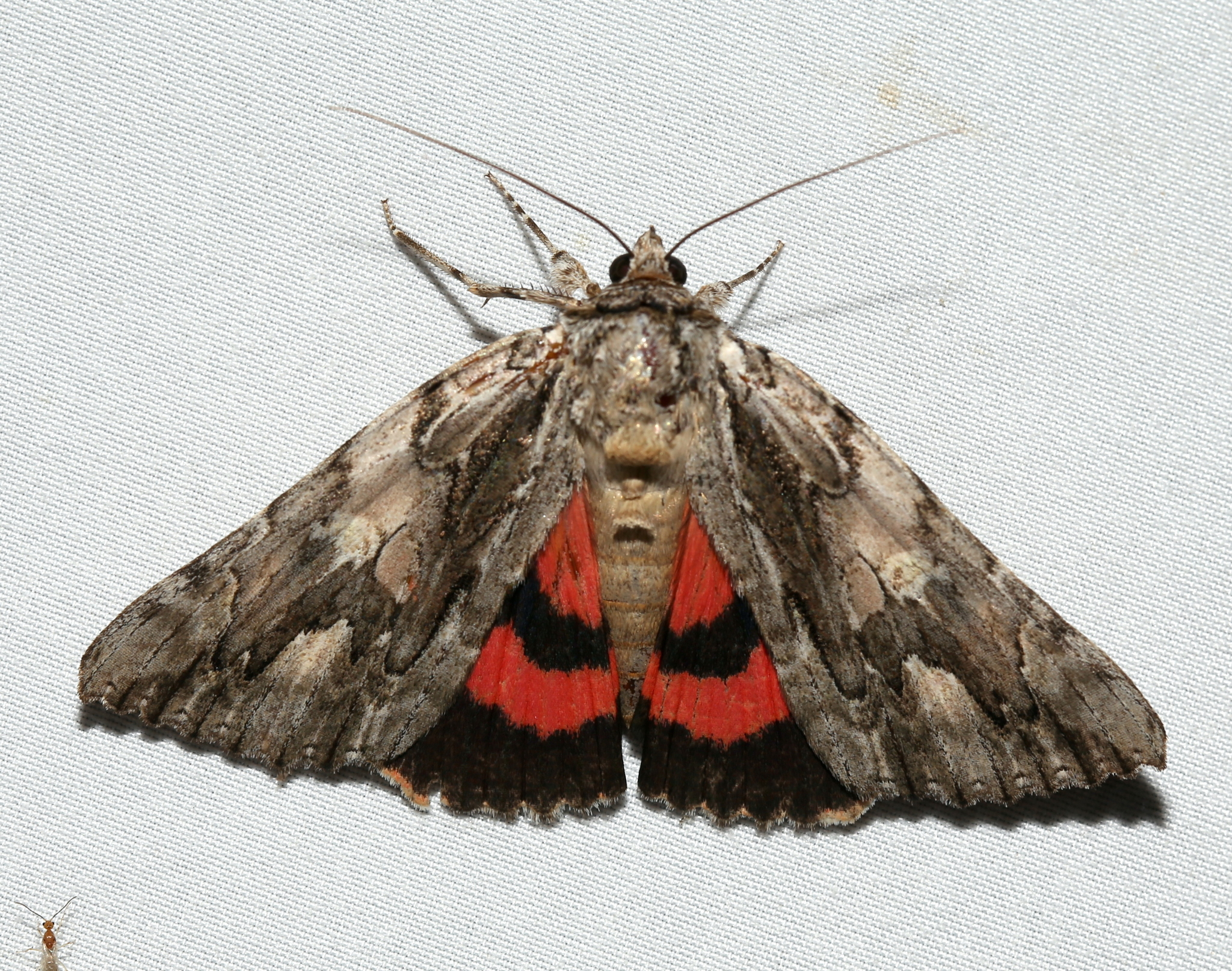

Scientific classification
- Kingdom: Animalia
- Phylum: Arthropoda
- Class: Insecta
- Order: Lepidoptera
- Superfamily: Noctuoidea
- Family: Erebidae
- Genus: Catocala
- Species: C. coccinata

Binomial name
- Catocala coccinata Grote, 1872

Synonyms
- Catocala chiquita Bartsch, 1916; Catocala coccinata var. circe Strecker, 1876; Catocala sinuosa Grote, 1879

= Catocala coccinata =

Scarlet underwing

Species of moth

Catocala coccinata, the scarlet underwing, is a moth of the family Erebidae. The species was first described by Augustus Radcliffe Grote in 1872. It is found in southern Canada and the eastern United States, following river valleys onto the Great Plains and down to Florida.

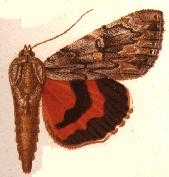
Illustration

The wingspan is 57–70 mm. Adults are on wing from June to September depending on the location.

The larvae feed on Quercus species, including Quercus macrocarpa.

== Subspecies ==
- Catocala coccinata coccinata
- Catocala coccinata sinuosa Grote, 1879 (Florida)
