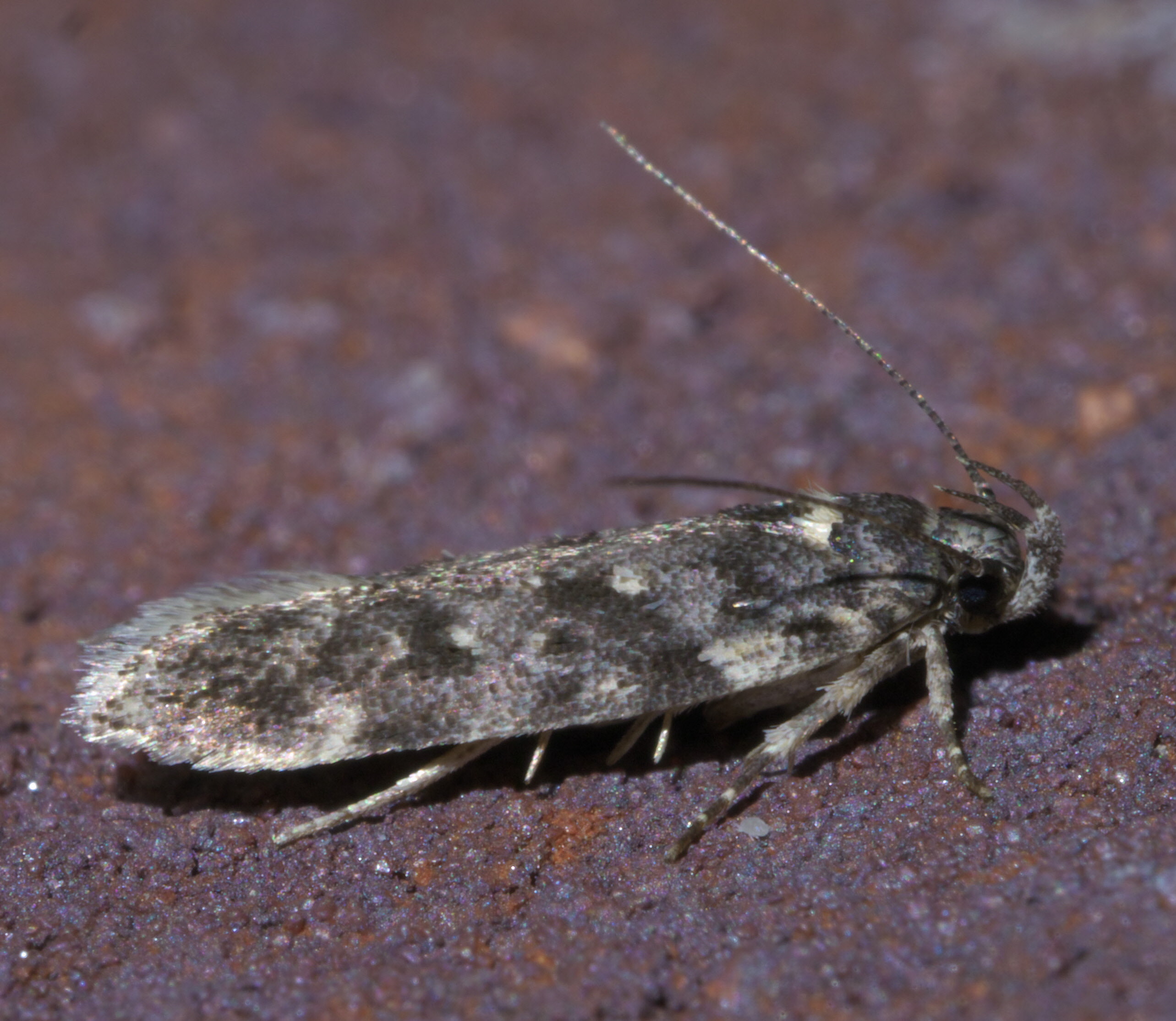

Scientific classification
- Kingdom: Animalia
- Phylum: Arthropoda
- Clade: Pancrustacea
- Class: Insecta
- Order: Lepidoptera
- Family: Gelechiidae
- Genus: Chionodes
- Species: C. fuscomaculella

Binomial name
- Chionodes fuscomaculella (Chambers, 1872)

Synonyms
- Gelechia fuscomaculella Chambers, 1872; Gelechia maculimarginella Chambers, 1874; Gelechia caryaevorella Packard, 1886

= Chionodes fuscomaculella =

Species of moth

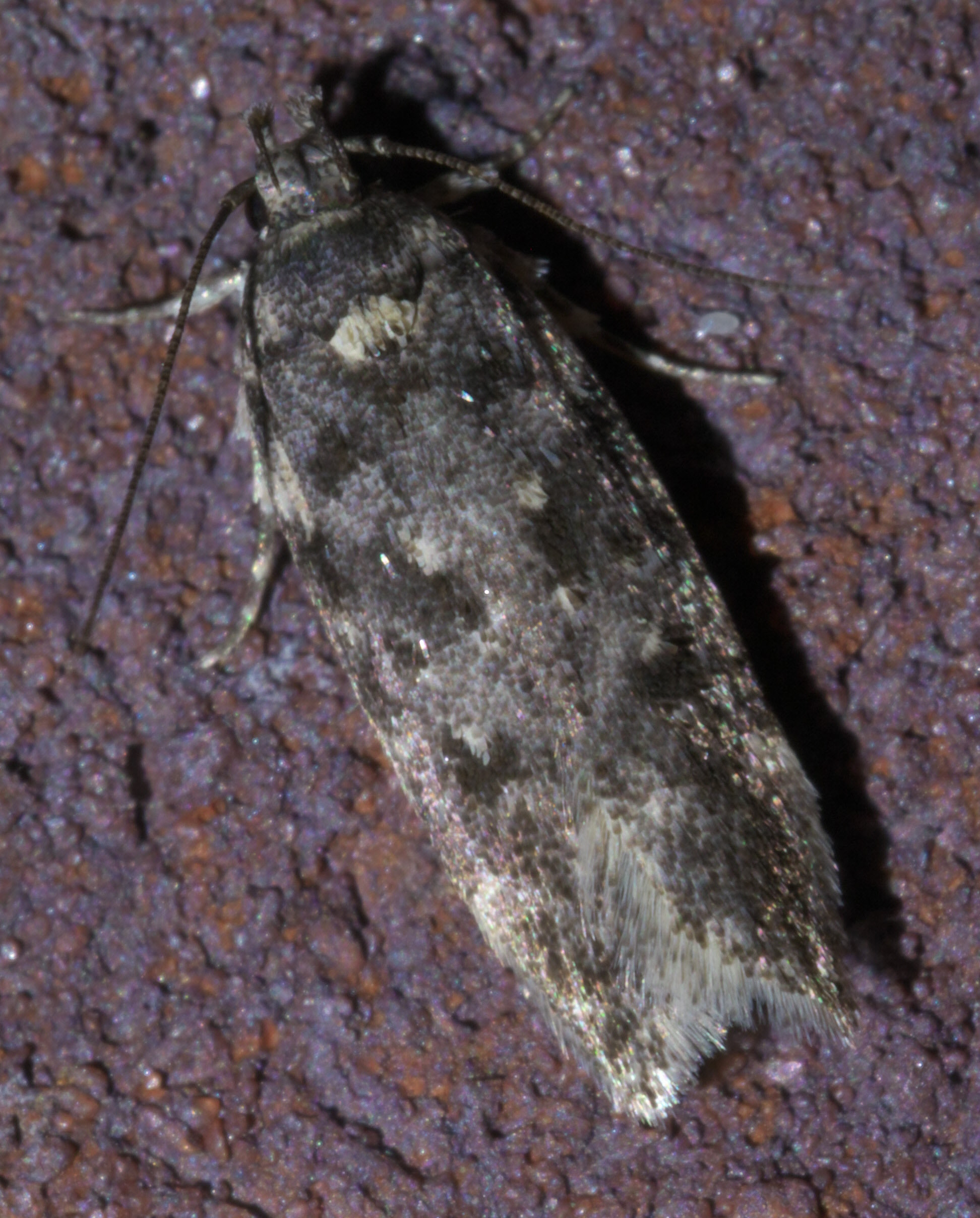
Chionodes fuscomaculella, leaftier, Size: 7.7 mm

Chionodes fuscomaculella is a moth in the family Gelechiidae. It is found in North America, where it has been recorded from Nova Scotia and Quebec to Florida, south-western Wisconsin, eastern Texas and eastern Oklahoma.

The forewings are dusted with brown, aggregated into irregular spots and blotches.

The larvae feed on Quercus macrocarpa, Quercus rubra, Fagus grandifolia and Carya species.
