= R. J. Lewis =

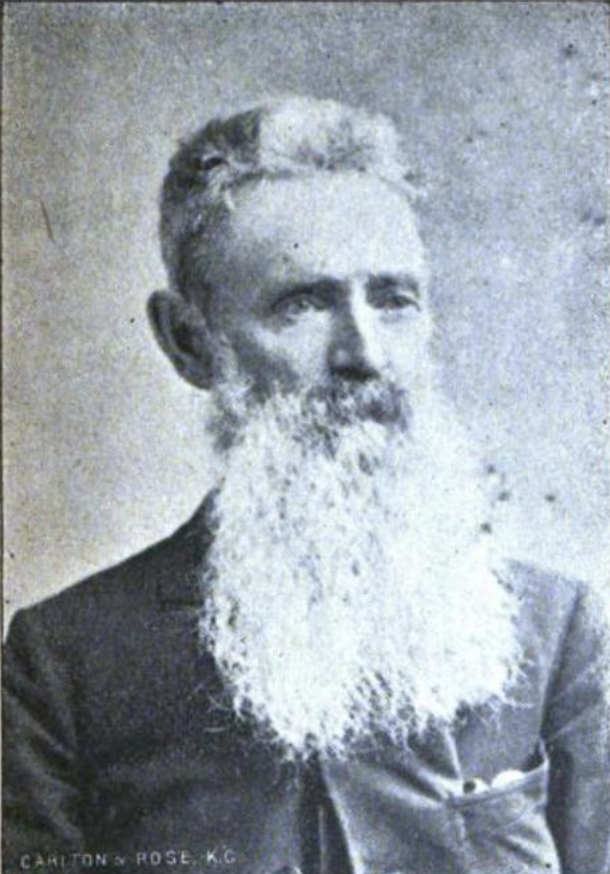
- Born: Reese Jones Lewis
- Known for: Poetry

Signature
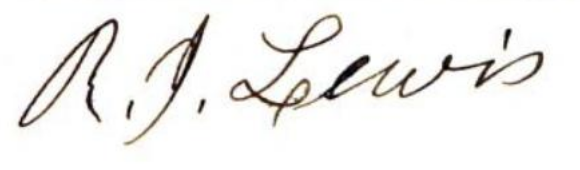

R. J. Lewis, also known as Judge Lewis, was a Welsh-American poet, philosopher, and judge.

He was a native of Radnorshire, Wales who moved to Kansas City, Missouri in 1858.

== History ==
Rees Jones Lewis was born August 24, 1831, in Radnorshire, Wales. He was 2 years old when his parents moved to Michigan where he got his education.

Between 1857 and 1858 he practised law in Michigan. On December 24, 1860, he married Mary E. Allison in Ypsilanti, Michigan. He then moved to southwest Missouri, and practised law until May 1861, after which he moved to Fort Scott, Kansas.

On August 24, 1861, during the American Civil War, he enlisted in Company C of the 6th Kansas Volunteer Cavalry as first lieutenant.

In June 1863, he was appointed judge-advocate of the District of the Border to Major-General Samuel R. Curtis at Fort Leavenworth.

He was honorably discharged in December 1864 and proceeded to Fort Leavenworth to continue his practise.

In spring of 1865, he moved to Kansas City, Missouri (near his family in Westport) where he continued to practise law as well as operate a sandstone quarry on his property, which is now part of Eagle Bluffs Conservation Area.

The 1881 History of Jackson County, Missouri reports that he had five children: Jennie M., Ettie R., Rus. J., Albert A., and Mary B. Lewis.

== Poetry ==
In 1898, he published over 80 poems in Four Centuries and Other Poems. It was published in Kansas City, Missouri introduced by fellow poet Laura Coates Reed.

An example of his poetry is:

HAPPY AS A CLAM

When the winds are a blowing

And the doors are all a slam,

I love to hear them roaring

I'm as happy as a clam.

I am glad when I am thinking

That I am free as any man,

That I can be myself -

And happy, happy as a clam.

Fortune may be frowning

But a man may be a man;

The thought it makes me happy,

Happy as a clam.

Change in fate and fortune

Seems to be the plan,

Still we can do our thinking

And be happy, happy as a clam.

Fate may be against us

Do what ere she can.

But if we act the right

We'll be happy, happy as a clam.

== See also ==
- History of Missouri
