= Rocky Fork Creek =

Stream in the U.S. state of Missouri

Coordinates: 38°59′35″N 92°23′57″W

Rocky Fork Creek is a stream in Boone County in the U.S. state of Missouri. It is a tributary to Perche Creek. Rocky Fork Creek was named for the limestone deposits near a fork in the watercourse. The Rocky Fork Lakes Conservation Area is named after the stream.

== See also ==
- List of rivers of Missouri
