= Rocky Fork Lakes Conservation Area =

Protected land in Missouri, U.S.

- Location within Missouri Location within the United States
- Location: Boone, Missouri, United States
- Coordinates: 39°4′0.17″N 92°18′8.05″W
- Area: 2,199.6 acres (8.901 km^{2})
- Governing body: Missouri Department of Conservation
- Website: Rocky Fork Lakes Conservation Area

Rock Fork Lakes Conservation Area is a nature preserve and former strip mine in Boone County, Missouri. Located north of Columbia, Missouri adjacent to Finger Lakes State Park it is over 2000 acres of lakes, wetlands, forest, and prairie. Much of the land is severely degraded from strip mining by the Peabody Coal Company from 1963 to 1972. The land was acquired by the Missouri Department of Conservation in 1979. A shooting range is open to the public and was renovated in 2014. The shooting range is monitored by a safety and maintenance technician. The 50-acre Rocky Fork Lake has a boat ramp and is used for fishing. It is named after Rocky Fork Creek.

== See also ==
- List of Missouri conservation areas – Central region
