= Hart Creek Conservation Area =

Protected land in Missouri, U.S.

- Location within Missouri Location within the United States
- Location: Boone, Missouri, United States
- Coordinates: 38°42′26.39″N 92°19′28.08″W
- Area: 657 acres (266 ha)
- Governing body: Missouri Department of Conservation
- Website: Hart Creek Conservation Area

Hart Creek Conservation Area is a nature preserve in Boone County, Missouri. It is named after Hart Creek, which runs through the area. It is adjacent to the Katy Trail State Park, which runs along its southwestern border. The area is primarily managed forest and limestone bluffs near the Missouri River. It is located near the town of Hartsburg, Missouri.

== See also ==
- List of Missouri conservation areas – Central region
