= Bonne Femme Creek (Boone County, Missouri) =

Stream in the U.S. state of Missouri

Coordinates: 38.7369774°N 92.3651878°W

Bonne Femme Creek (/bɒnˈfæm/ bon-FAM), also known as Big Bonne Femme Creek, is a stream in Boone County in the U.S. state of Missouri. It is a tributary of the Missouri River. The creek is one of the "three creeks" of Three Creeks Conservation Area. According to tradition, Bonne Femme ("good woman") was the nickname of an Indian who helped a French settler recover from his wounds. Its two major tributaries are Turkey Creek and Bass Creek.

== See also ==
- List of rivers of Missouri
