= Finger Lakes State Park =

State park in Missouri, United States

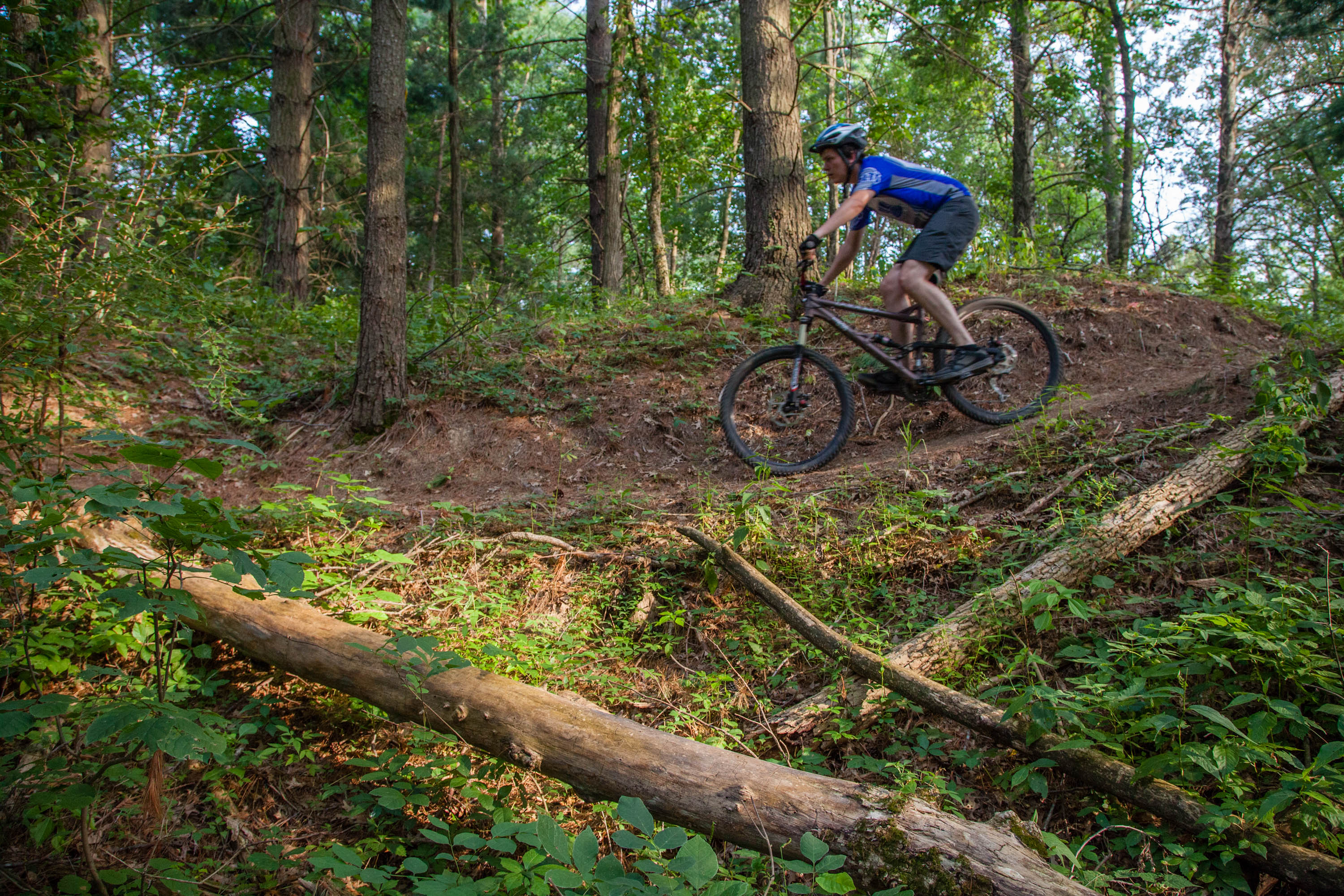
- Cyclist off-roading in the park

- Location within Missouri Location within the United States
- Location: Boone County, Missouri, United States
- Coordinates: 39°05′26″N 92°19′00″W
- Area: 1,138.69 acres (460.81 ha)
- Elevation: 722 ft (220 m)
- Established: 1973
- Administrator: Missouri Department of Natural Resources
- Visitors: 114,226 (in 2022)
- Website: Official website

Finger Lakes State Park is a public recreation area consisting of 1,138 acres (461 ha) in Boone County near the city of Columbia, Missouri, and adjacent to the Rocky Fork Lakes Conservation Area. The state park is unusual in that the site was reclaimed after having been strip mined for coal. It is one of two state parks in Missouri used for off-road vehicles. The history of the other, St. Joe State Park, is also connected with mining.

== History ==
Between 1964 and 1967, the area was known as Peabody Coal's Mark Twain Mine, from which the company removed 1.2 million short tons (1.1 Tg) of coal. In 1974, Peabody donated the land to the state for use as a park. The state restored the site with federal grant money that was issued with the intent to demonstrate the conversion of strip-mined land to recreational use.

== Features ==
The park has many hills and gullies that are crossed by more than 70 miles (110 km) of trails for off-road motorcycles, ATVs, and motocross. A 1.5-mile-long (2.4 km) corridor of water, created by joining small isolated lakes left from the mining operations, is used for canoeing, fishing, swimming, and scuba diving.

== Activities and amenities ==
Activities at the park include camping, fishing, kayaking, picnicking, swimming, mountain biking, and ATV riding.

== See also ==
- Surface Mining Control and Reclamation Act of 1977
- Peabody River State Fish and Wildlife Area: Illinois state park on reclaimed Peabody coal mines
- St. Joe State Park: Missouri state park on reclaimed lead mines
