= Turkey Creek (Bonne Femme Creek tributary) =

Stream in the U.S. state of Missouri

Coordinates: 38.835592°N 92.304630°W

Turkey Creek is a stream in Boone County in the U.S. state of Missouri. It is a tributary of Bonne Femme Creek. Turkey Creek was named for the wild turkeys along its course. It is one of three large creeks in Three Creeks Conservation Area.

== See also ==
- List of rivers of Missouri
