= Bur oak blight =

Fungal disease of bur oak trees

- Common names: BOB
- Causal agents: Tubakia iowensis
- Hosts: Bur oaks (Quercus macrocarpa)

Bur oak blight

Scientific classification
- Kingdom: Fungi
- Division: Ascomycota
- Class: Sordariomycetes
- Order: Diaporthales
- Family: Tubakiaceae
- Genus: Tubakia
- Species: T. iowensis

Binomial name
- Tubakia iowensis T.C. Harr & D. McNew

Bur oak blight (BOB) is a fungal disease that is relatively new to the plant pathogen field. BOB started to appear in Midwestern states in the 1990s. The first few diagnoses pointed to a common fungus, Tubakia dryina, as the culprit. However upon further research BOB was said to be caused by a new unnamed species of Tubakia, later named Tubakia iowensis. BOB has severe symptoms and is a serious new problem.

== Hosts and symptoms ==
The host for this disease is the bur oak, Quercus macrocarpa. Research shows that Q. macrocarpa var. olivaeformis tends to be the most susceptible to the pathogen, but the more common and widespread Q. macrocarpa var. macrocarpa has also been affected by BOB. Q. macrocarpa var. olivaeformis has a range centered in the state of Iowa and is characterized by acorns that are olive shaped and smaller than the acorns of other susceptible varieties. The range of BOB is centered in the state of Iowa, and has been confirmed in southern Minnesota.

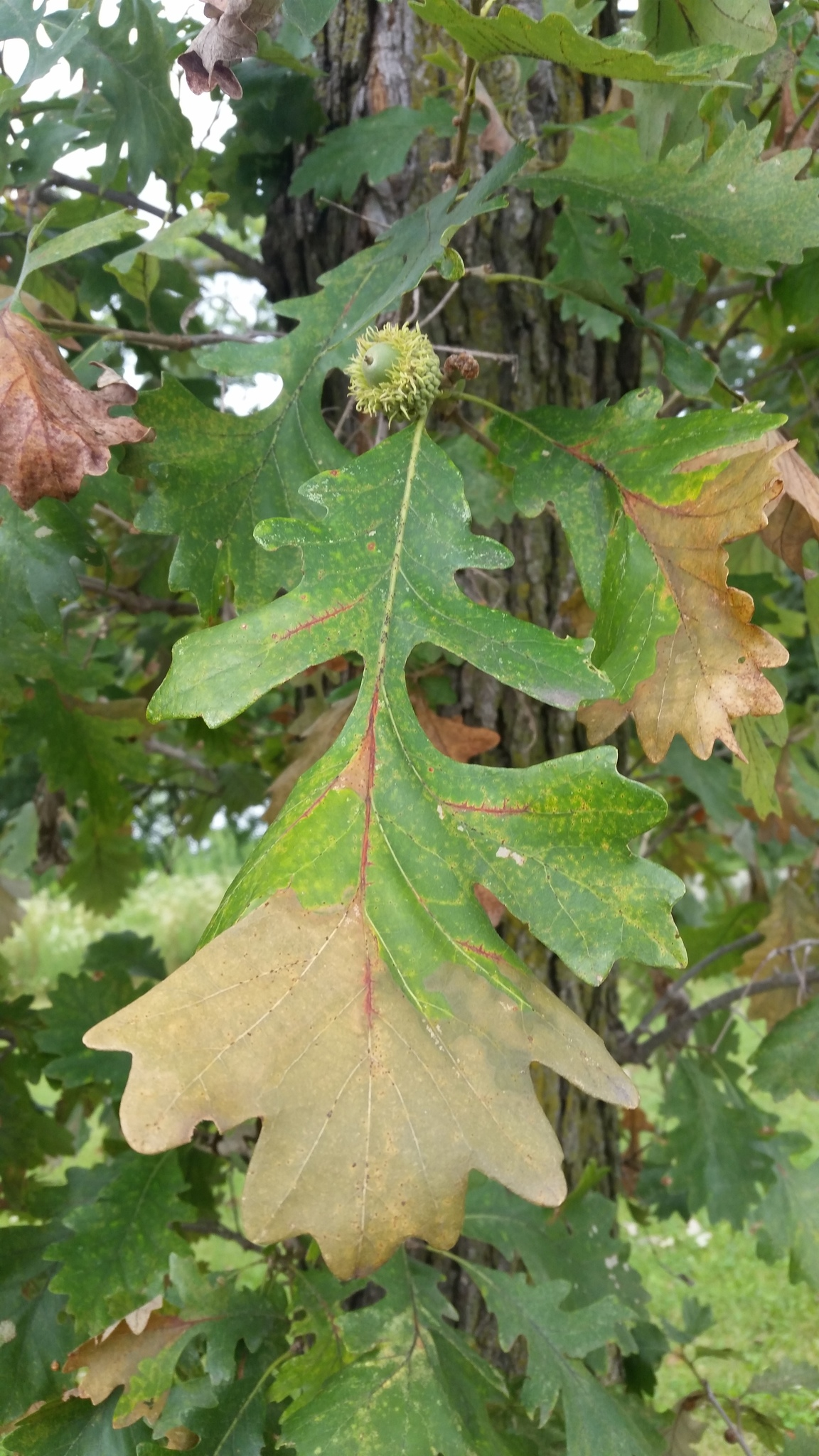
Leaf (adaxial) of bur oak infected by BOB

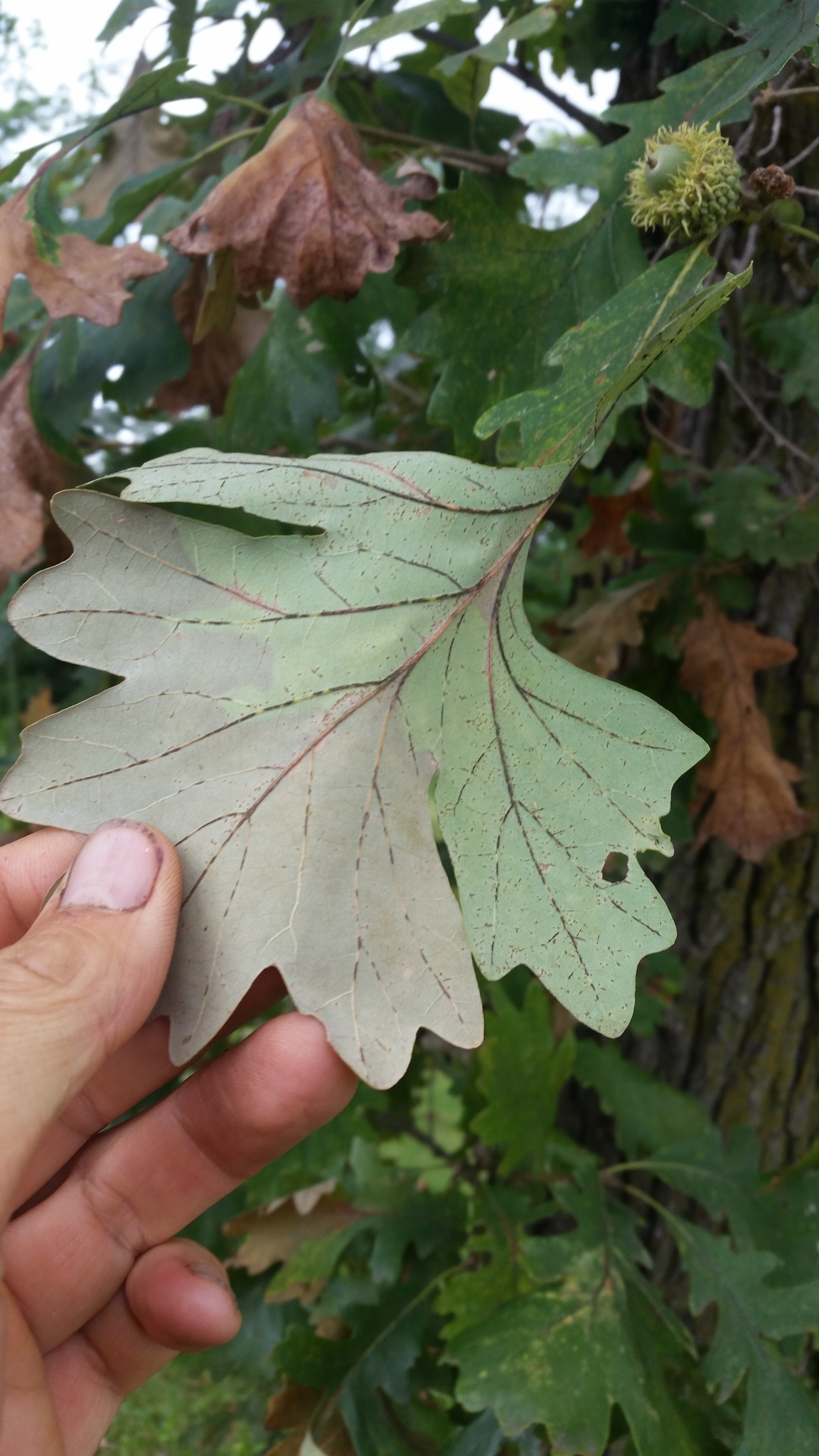
Leaf (adaxial) of bur oak infected by BOB

When affected by the disease, the oak develops vein necrosis confined to the leaf midvein and major lateral veins, eventually causing leaf death. Symptoms typically start in the lower crown of the tree and eventually spread to the entire tree. If this disease persists for many years, there can be lasting effects. One example is the possible loss of food reserves. This can leave the tree susceptible to greater insect predation, secondary infections from other pathogens, and death. A distinguishing characteristic of T. iowensis is the formation of black crustose asexual fruiting bodies at the base of the petioles that are retained until the following year. These distinctive fruiting bodies are pycnothyria (conidiomata) with radiating setae-like hyphae that form along the necrotic veins.

== Disease cycle ==
In spring, black crustose conidiomata (pychnothyria) that have served as the overwintering mechanism of the disease release conidia. These spores are dispersed most commonly in the presence of moisture such as heavy rain or morning dew. Conidia are also easily wind dispersed. The spores land on healthy leaves, and the process of infection begins. Symptoms begin to appear on the leaves in July and August. As autumn approaches, BOB forms pychnothyria along leaf veins and on the base of the leaf petioles that remain on the tree until spring. The petiole forms an abscission layer, but pustules under the epidermis form, possibly causing leaf retention. This prepares the disease for winter, and the cycle repeats. Secondary infection could occur during abnormally wet periods in the summer given this pathogen's polycyclic potential. A polycyclic pathogen is one that is able to go through several infection cycles in one season.

== Environment ==
According to the National Oceanic and Atmospheric Administration, or NOAA, over the previous two decades the state of Iowa has received more early season rainfall than in years past. This increase in moisture may be what is leading to a more favorable environment for BOB to flourish in. It is unknown if the observed disease is caused by a new pathogen or if the conditions are simply more favorable for the existing pathogen to thrive. Several changes have been documented in the Iowa annual cycles including warmer nighttime temperatures, more humidity, more spring and summer rainfall, and a shift from the normal late season precipitation. In the latter part of April and into May rains help BOB during its most critical period by slashing conidia from the crustose pychnothyria on the upper surface of the leaf. The amount of rainfall during this critical time of year has been higher than the normal averages since 1895. They also report that there have been no droughts in Iowa from 1989–2011. This increase in moisture is thought to be responsible for the buildup of primary inoculum. Repeated defoliations due to high concentrations of BOB conidia will eventually lead to a depletion of the bur oak’s food reserves and ultimately cause death.

== Management ==
When left untreated, BOB will often kill the infected tree. Management is thus an important implication when discussing this disease. Due to the fact that BOB overwinters on leaf petioles that stay on the tree, removing fallen infected leaves will do little in terms of disease control. One proven method of attacking the pathogen is the introduction of a fungicide. Macro injections of the fungicide Alamo™ (Propiconazole (K)) have been shown to be effective on a two-year rotation. Dosage should be carefully monitored, as there are some phytotoxic effects.

== Importance ==
The impact of BOB reaches many aspects of the regions in which it is found. First is the impact on the wildlife that live around the oaks. Bur oaks, along with other oak species, are prolific acorn producers during mast years. Many birds and mammals use the acorns of the oak as a source of nutrition. Declining bur oak populations could also wreak havoc on wildlife populations that are dependent on acorns for food. These organisms would either have to find another food source, move to a new area, or may perish due to a lack of resources.

The loss of these oaks can also cause costly problems in city management. Dead bur oak trees pose a problem for the upkeep of urban areas. At $1000 per tree for removal, costs can add up fast. In the state of Iowa, removal can reach over $700,000 trees a year. This could hurt the economies of the areas affected.
