= McBaine, Missouri =

- Town
- Village of McBaine
- Location of McBaine, Missouri
- Coordinates: 38°53′01″N 92°27′20″W
- Country: United States
- State: Missouri
- County: Boone

Area
  - Total: 0.20 sq mi (0.51 km^{2})
  - Land: 0.19 sq mi (0.50 km^{2})
  - Water: 0.0077 sq mi (0.02 km^{2})
- Elevation: 577 ft (176 m)

Population (2020)
  - Total: 17
  - Density: 88.8/sq mi (34.28/km^{2})
- Time zone: UTC-6 (Central (CST))
  - Summer (DST): UTC-5 (CDT)
- ZIP code: 65203
- Area code: 573
- FIPS code: 29-44768
- GNIS feature ID: 2396743

McBaine is a village in Boone County, Missouri, United States. It is part of the Columbia, Missouri Metropolitan Statistical Area. The population was 17 at the 2020 census. McBaine is located just north of Eagle Bluffs Conservation Area and within sight of The Big Tree.

== History ==
McBaine was laid out in 1899, and named after Turner McBaine, the original owner of the site. A post office called McBaine was established in 1894, and remained in operation until 1958.

== Geography ==
According to the United States Census Bureau, the village has a total area of 0.22 square miles (0.57 km^{2}), all land.

== Demographics ==
Historical population
Census	Pop.	Note	%±
1930	125		—
1940	131		4.8%
1950	75		−42.7%
2000	17		—
2010	10		−41.2%
2020	17		70.0%
U.S. Decennial Census

=== 2010 census ===
As of the census of 2010, there were 10 people, 6 households, and 1 families living in the village. The population density was 45.5 inhabitants per square mile (17.6/km^{2}). There were 7 housing units at an average density of 31.8 per square mile (12.3/km^{2}). The racial makeup of the village was 100.0% White.

There were 6 households, of which 16.7% were married couples living together and 83.3% were non-families. 50.0% of all households were made up of individuals. The average household size was 1.67 and the average family size was 3.00.

The median age in the village was 54 years. 0.0% of residents were under the age of 18; 10% were between the ages of 18 and 24; 30% were from 25 to 44; 30% were from 45 to 64; and 30% were 65 years of age or older. The gender makeup of the village was 70.0% male and 30.0% female.

=== 2000 census ===
As of the census of 2000, there were 17 people, 9 households, and 2 families living in the village. The population density was 73.2 inhabitants per square mile (28.3/km^{2}). There were 12 housing units at an average density of 51.7 per square mile (20.0/km^{2}). The racial makeup of the village was 100.00% White.

There were 9 households, out of which 33.3% had children under the age of 18 living with them, none were married couples living together, 33.3% had a female householder with no husband present, and 66.7% were non-families. 44.4% of all households were made up of individuals, and none had someone living alone who was 65 years of age or older. The average household size was 1.89 and the average family size was 2.67.

In the village, the population was spread out, with 29.4% under the age of 18, 17.6% from 18 to 24, 41.2% from 25 to 44, 11.8% from 45 to 64. The median age was 30 years. For every 100 females, there were 70.0 males. For every 100 females age 18 and over, there were 71.4 males.

The median income for a household in the village was $21,875, and the median income for a family was $20,625. Males had a median income of $0 versus $20,625 for females. The per capita income for the village was $10,112. About 33.3% of families and 35.3% of the population were below the poverty line, including 40.0% of under eighteens and none of those over 64.

== Education ==
Its school district is Columbia 93 School District.
