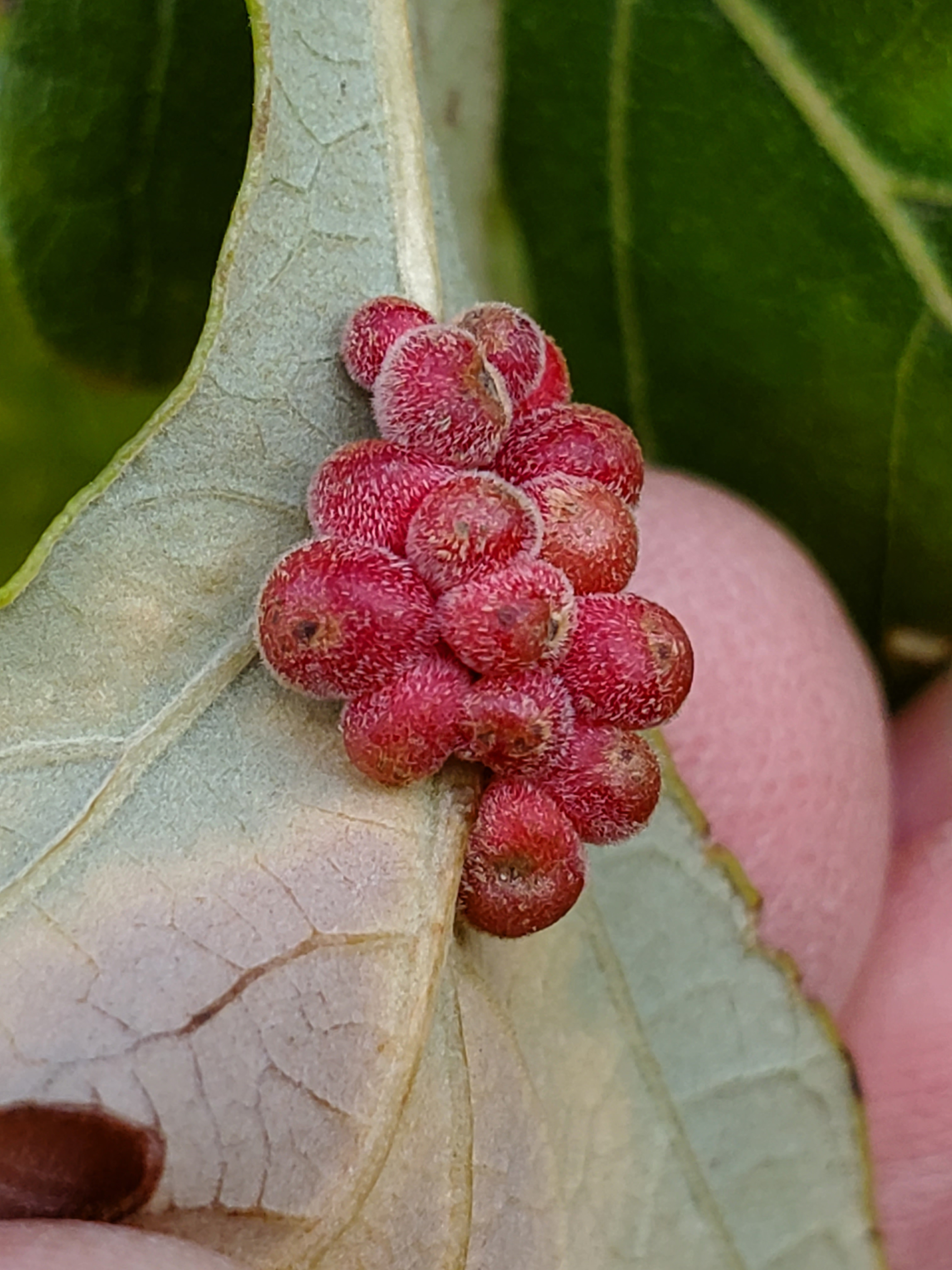
- Andricus dimorphus galls on bur oak

Scientific classification
- Domain: Eukaryota
- Kingdom: Animalia
- Phylum: Arthropoda
- Class: Insecta
- Order: Hymenoptera
- Family: Cynipidae
- Genus: Andricus
- Species: A. dimorphus

Binomial name
- Andricus dimorphus (Beutenmuller, 1913)

Synonyms
- Cynips dimorphus; Adleria dimorpha

= Andricus dimorphus =

Species of oak gall wasp

Andricus dimorphus, also called the clustered midrib gall wasp, is a species of oak gall wasp in the family Cynipidae. Galls in which the larvae live and feed are formed in clusters along the midrib on the underside of oak leaves.

== Range ==
This species has been found throughout central and eastern North America where its host species occur.

== Description ==
Confirmed hosts of the clustered midrib gall wasp are white oak species, including Quercus macrocarpa, Q. alba, Q. prinoides, and Q. bicolor. Clusters of up to 50 globular (but with a pointed base), red-brown galls are formed along the midrib on the underside of leaves beginning in late summer. The galls readily detach from the leaf, particularly when mature. Adults emerge from the galls the following year. Inquilines and parasitoids may inhabit the galls.

== Taxonomy ==
This species was first described by William Beutenmuller in 1913 with the name Cynips dimorphus. According to Clarence Gillette, William Ashmead had already used this name by 1889 for a species that produces galls similar to those of Beutenmuller's Cynips dimorphus. This species was later transferred to the genus Adleria which itself was subsequently included within Andricus.
