= Peabody River State Fish and Wildlife Area =

State park in Illinois, USA

- IUCN category IV (habitat/species management area)
- Location within Illinois Location within the United States
- Location: Randolph County, Illinois, USA
- Nearest city: Baldwin, Illinois
- Coordinates: 38°13′03″N 89°52′09″W
- Area: 2,200 acres (890 ha)
- Governing body: Illinois Department of Natural Resources

Peabody River State Fish and Wildlife Area is an Illinois state park on 2,200 acres (890 ha) in Randolph County, Illinois, United States. It is built on reclaimed mines worked by the Peabody Coal Company from the late 1950s to the late 1980s.

== See also ==
- Finger Lakes State Park: Missouri state park on reclaimed Peabody mines
