= Lick Creek Conservation Area =

Protected land in Missouri, U.S.

- Location within Missouri Location within the United States
- Location: Boone County, Missouri, United States
- Coordinates: 39°9′3.95″N 92°23′7″W
- Area: 317 acres (128 ha)
- Governing body: Missouri Department of Conservation
- Website: luck Creek Conservation Area

Lick Creek Conservation Area is a nature preserve in Boone County, Missouri. It is named after Lick Creek, which runs through the west end. In the 20th century, the area was severely degraded by human activists, farming, and cattle grazing. The conservation department purchased the area in 1992. The preserve features a twelve-acre lake and a small pine plantation. Primitive camping is allowed.

== See also ==
- List of Missouri conservation areas – Central region
