= Bass Creek =

Stream in Missouri, U.S.

Coordinates: 38.8342032°N 92.2910187°W

Bass Creek is a stream in Boone County in the U.S. state of Missouri. It is a tributary of Bonne Femme Creek, which flows into the Missouri River. The creek is one of the "three creeks" of Three Creeks Conservation Area. It is a losing stream and some of its water flows through Hunters Cave. The creek is named after Eli Bass, whose plantation it flowed through for much of the 1800s.

== See also ==
- List of rivers of Missouri
