= Three Creeks Conservation Area =

Protected land in Missouri, U.S.

- Location within Missouri Location within the United States
- Location: Boone, Missouri, United States
- Coordinates: 38°50′29.19″N 92°17′17.87″W
- Area: 1,497.4 acres (6.060 km^{2})
- Governing body: Missouri Department of Conservation
- Website: Three Creeks Conservation Area

Three Creeks Conservation Area is a nature preserve in Boone County, Missouri. Its Ozark terrain has many karst features including caves, springs, and sinkholes. It is located south of Columbia, Missouri and the more well-known Rock Bridge Memorial State Park. The conservation area is named after the three streams which flow through it: Turkey Creek, Bass Creek, and Bonne Femme Creek. Its nearly 1500 acres are mostly forested and managed by the Missouri Department of Conservation. There are numerous trails for hiking.

In 2019, former Columbia Daily Tribune owners Hank Waters and Vicki Russell donated 207 acres adjacent to the park for the construction of a nature school. The school will be a cooperative effort between Columbia Public Schools and the Missouri Department of Conservation. Much of the land around and in Three Creeks was purchased and farmed by African-Americans after the American Civil War.

The area is part of the Bonne Femme Watershed Project.

== See also ==
- Three Creeks Township, Boone County, Missouri
- List of Missouri conservation areas – Central region
