= Eagle Bluffs Conservation Area =

Nature preserve in Boone County, Missouri, USA

Three Creeks Conservation Area
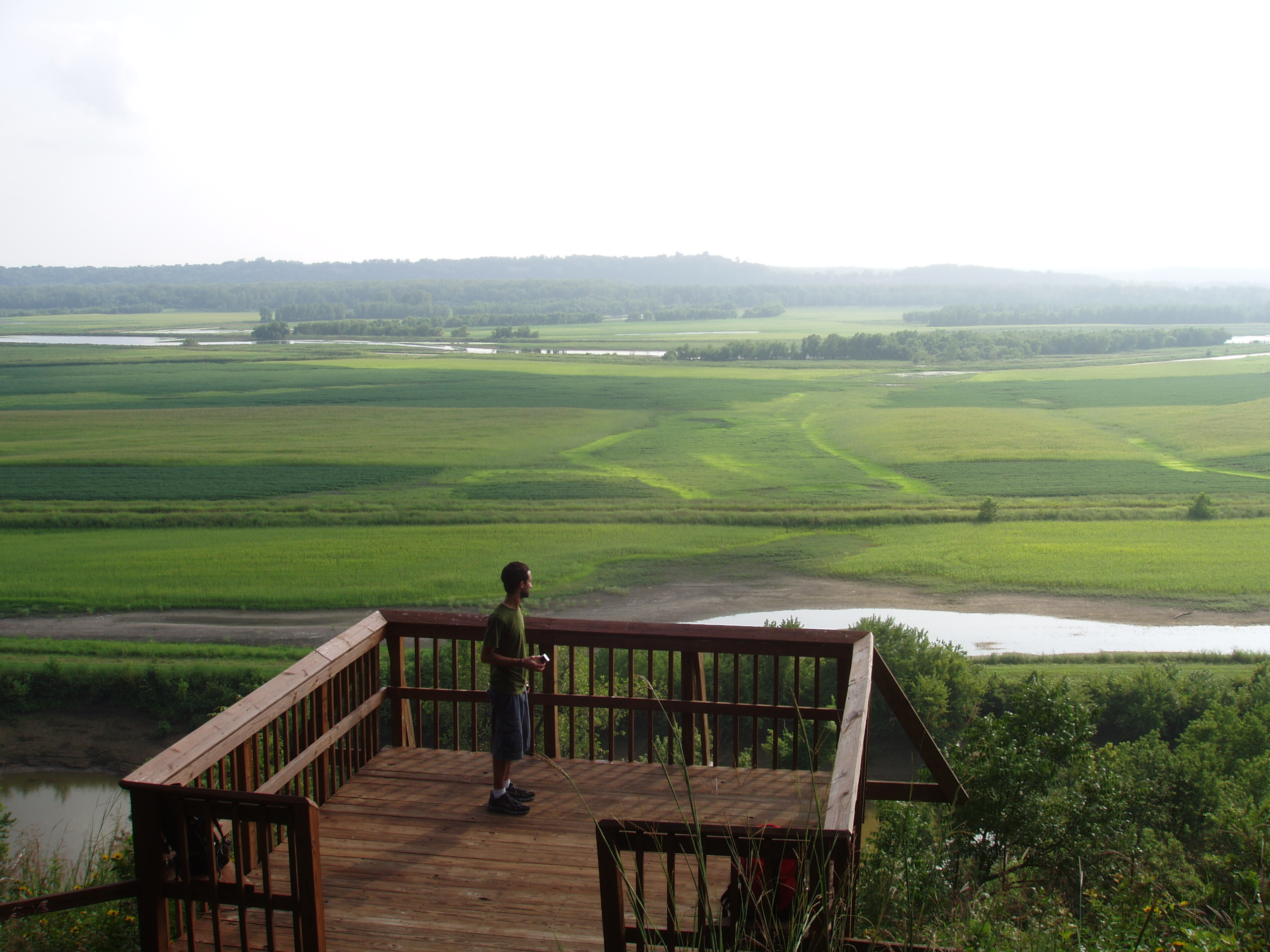
- The view from the overlook

- Location within Missouri Location within the United States
- Location: Boone, Missouri, United States
- Coordinates: 38°50′44.13″N 92°25′48.45″W
- Area: 4,428.6 acres (17.922 km^{2})
- Governing body: Missouri Department of Conservation
- Website: Eagle Bluffs Conservation Area

Eagle Bluffs Conservation Area is a nature preserve and wetland in Boone County, Missouri. Located mainly in the Missouri River floodplain southwest of Columbia, Missouri and managed by the Missouri Department of Conservation, the wetlands are a refuge for migrating birds and home to several breeding pairs of bald eagles. The area is named after these eagles and the tall bluffs along the eastern edge of the Missouri River floodplain. Perche Creek flows through the refuge. McBaine, Missouri is located at the north entrance to the area. The Katy Trail State Park traverses the area.

The conservation area was created after the Great Flood of 1993 destroyed farmland. Water for the wetlands is provided by the Missouri River, but also, an innovative system to supply wastewater from the City of Columbia's treatment plant.

== See also ==
- Three Creeks Conservation Area
- Rock Bridge Memorial State Park
