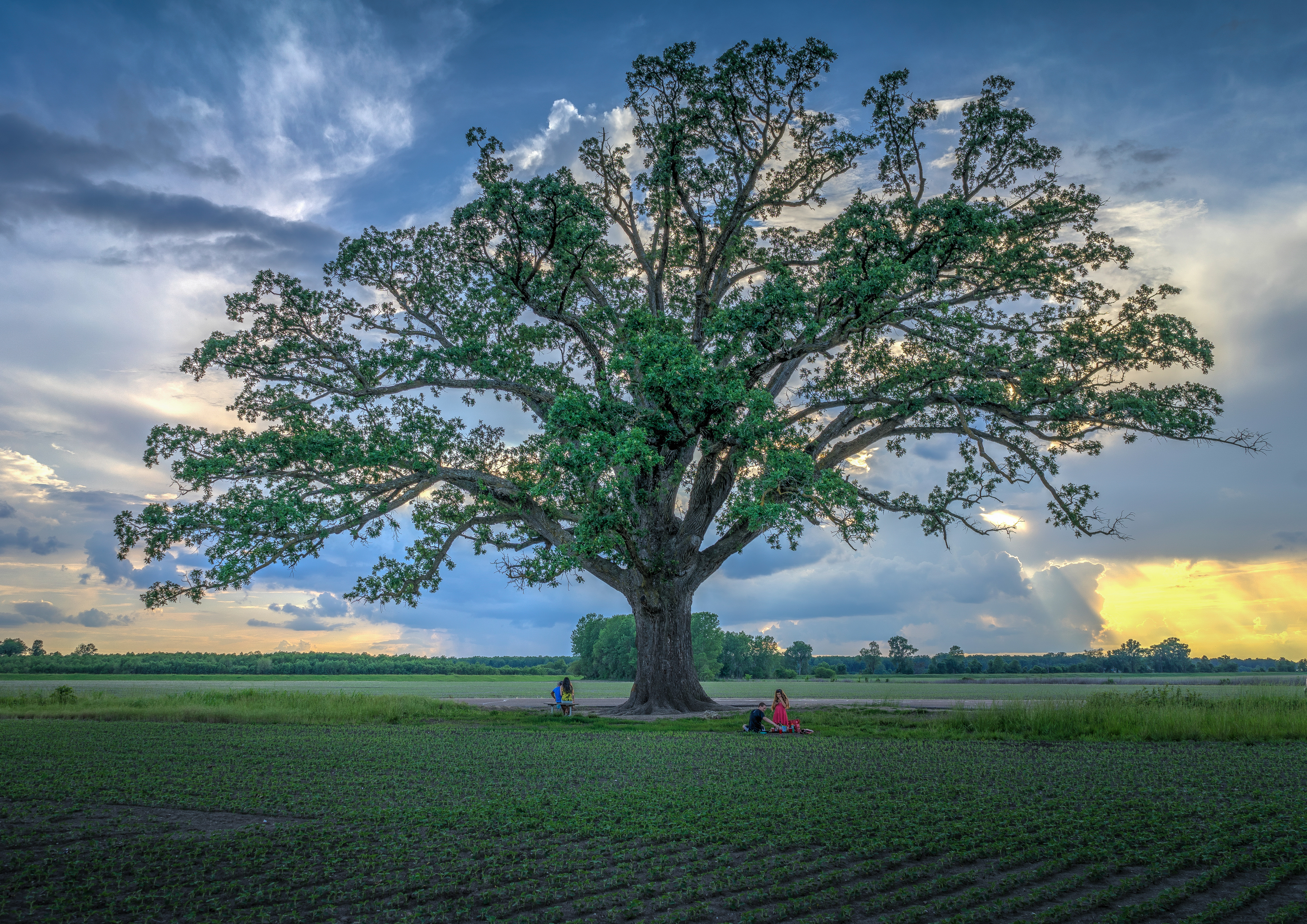
- A 400-year old tree in Missouri known as The Big Tree

Conservation status
- Least Concern (IUCN 3.1)

Scientific classification
- Kingdom: Plantae
- Clade: Embryophytes
- Clade: Tracheophytes
- Clade: Angiosperms
- Clade: Eudicots
- Clade: Rosids
- Order: Fagales
- Family: Fagaceae
- Genus: Quercus
- Subgenus: Quercus subg. Quercus
- Section: Quercus sect. Quercus
- Species: Q. macrocarpa

Binomial name
- Quercus macrocarpa Michx.
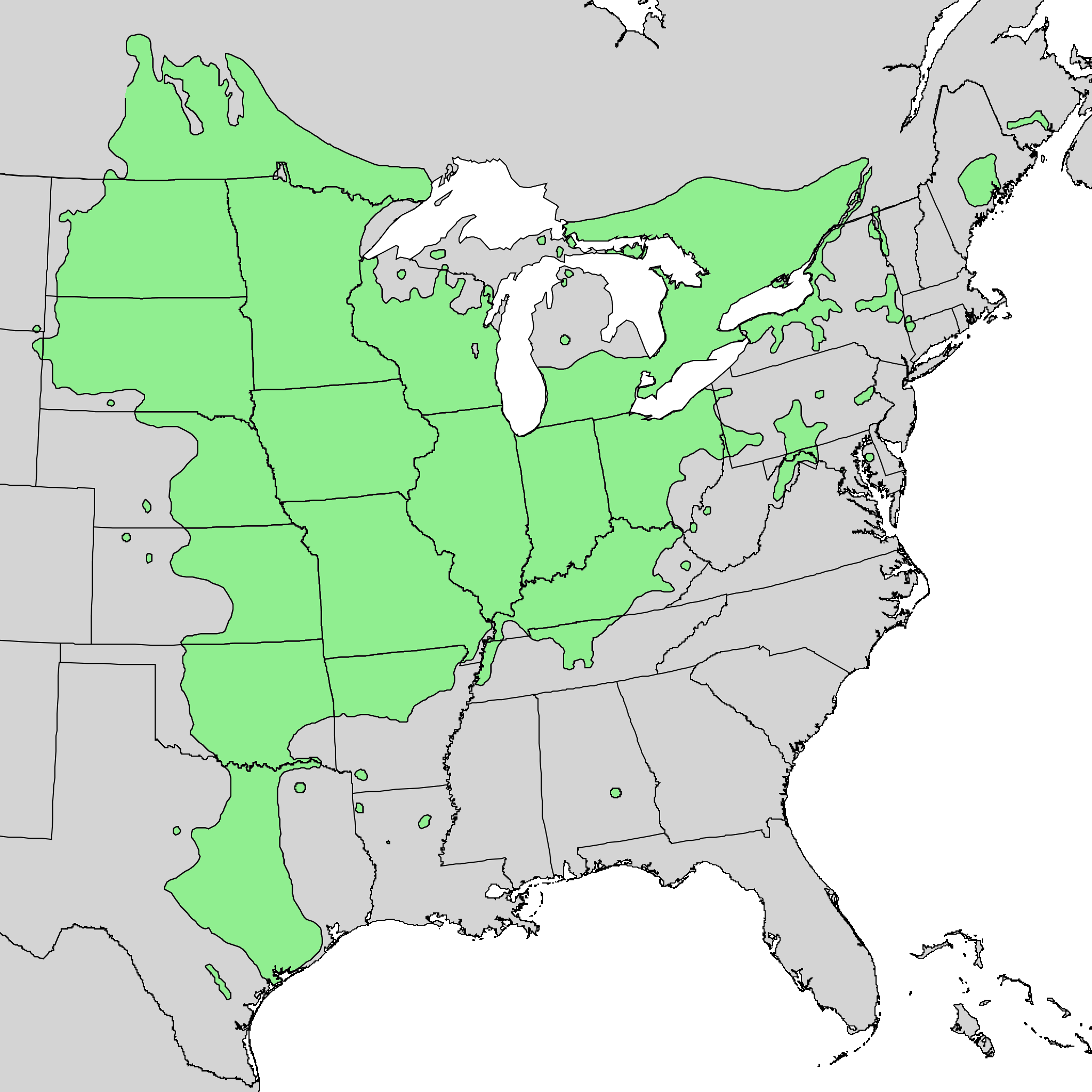
- Generalized natural range

Synonyms
- List: Quercus macrocarpus Michx.; Cerris macrocarpa (Michx.) Raf.; Cerris oliviformis (F.Michx.) Raf.; Quercus macrocarpa var. abbreviata A.DC.; Quercus macrocarpa var. alata Coleman; Quercus macrocarpa f. appressa Trel.; Quercus macrocarpa var. minor A.DC.; Quercus macrocarpa f. olivaeformis (F. Michx.) A. Gray; Quercus macrocarpa f. oliviformis (F.Michx.) Trel.; Quercus macrocarpa var. oliviformis (F.Michx.) A.Gray; Quercus macrocarpa subsp. oliviformis (F.Michx.) A.Camus; Quercus macrocarpa f. orbiculata Trel.; Quercus oliviformis F.Michx.; Quercus olivaeformis F.Michx.; Quercus macrocarpa subsp. eumacrocarpa (Michx.) A. Camus

= Quercus macrocarpa =

Species of oak tree

Quercus macrocarpa, the bur oak or burr oak, is a species of oak tree native to central and eastern North America. It is in the white oak section, Quercus sect. Quercus, and is also called mossycup oak, mossycup white oak, or scrub oak. The acorns are the largest of any North American oak (thus the species name macrocarpa, from Ancient Greek μακρός makrós "large" and καρπός karpós "fruit"), and are important food for wildlife.

== Description ==
Quercus macrocarpa is a large deciduous tree growing up to 30 metres (98 feet), rarely 50 m (160 ft), in height, and is one of the most massive oaks with a trunk diameter of up to 3 m (10 ft). It is one of the slowest-growing oaks, with a growth rate of 30 centimetres (12 in) per year when young. However, one source states that a well-established tree can grow up to 51 cm (20 in) per year. A 20-year-old tree will be about 18 m (60 ft) tall if grown in full sun. Naturally occurring saplings in forests will typically be older. Bur oaks commonly live to be 200 to 300 years old, and may live up to 400 years. The bark is gray with distinct vertical ridges.

The leaves are 7–15 cm (2 3/4–6 in) long and 5–13 cm (2–5 in) broad, variable in shape, with a lobed margin. Most often, the basal two-thirds is narrower and deeply lobed, while the apical third is wider and has shallow lobes or large teeth. They usually do not show strong fall color, although fine golden hues are occasionally seen. The flowers are greenish-yellow catkins, produced in the spring. The acorns are very large, 2.5–5 cm (1–2 in) long and 2–4 cm (3/4–1 1/2 in) broad, having a large cup that wraps much of the way around the nut, with large overlapping scales and often a fringe at the edge of the cup.

The wood when sawn transversely shows the characteristic annual rings formed by secondary thickening.

Bur oak is sometimes confused with other members of the white oak section, such as Quercus bicolor (swamp white oak), Quercus lyrata (overcup oak), and Quercus alba (white oak). It hybridises with several other species of oaks.

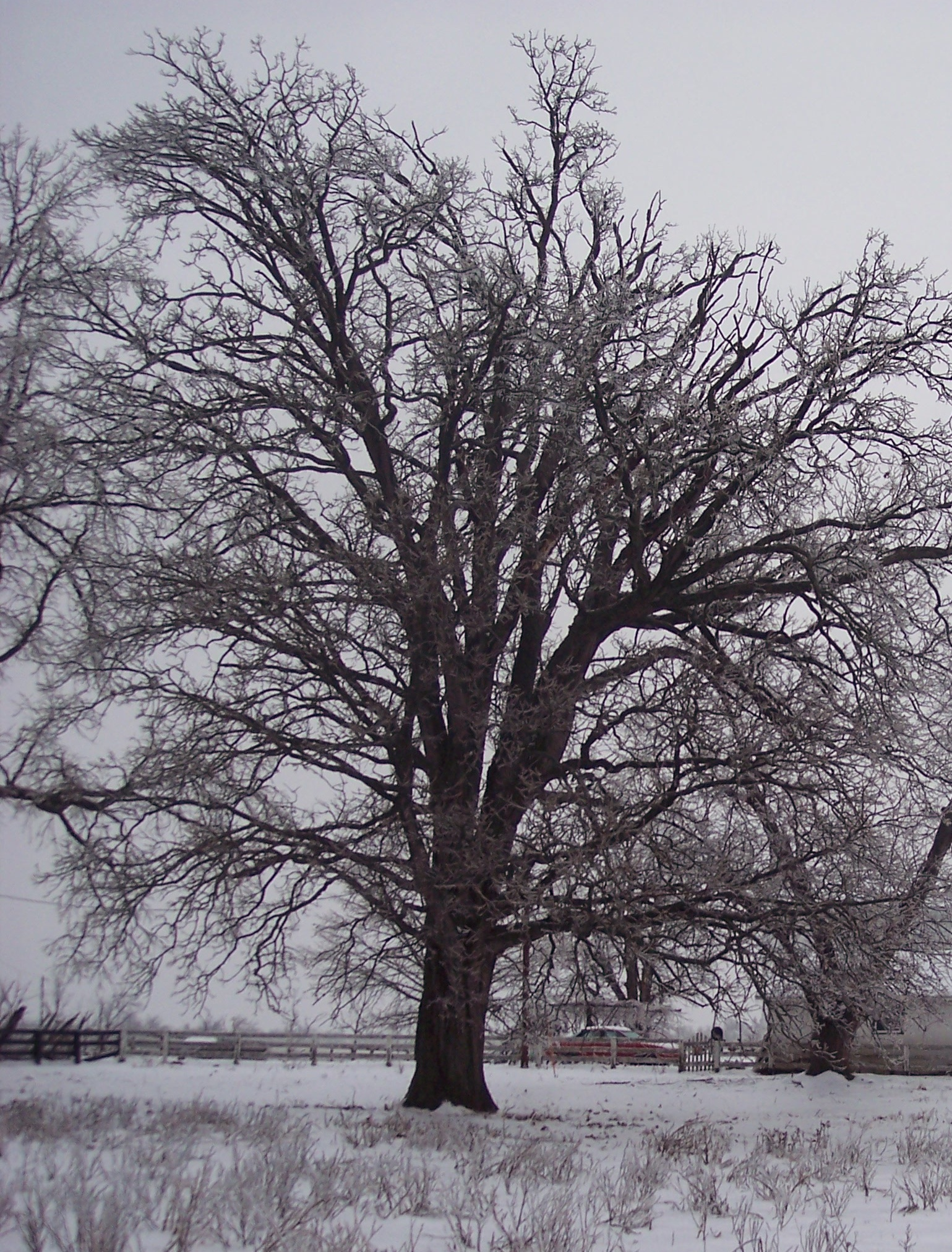
Spreading branches

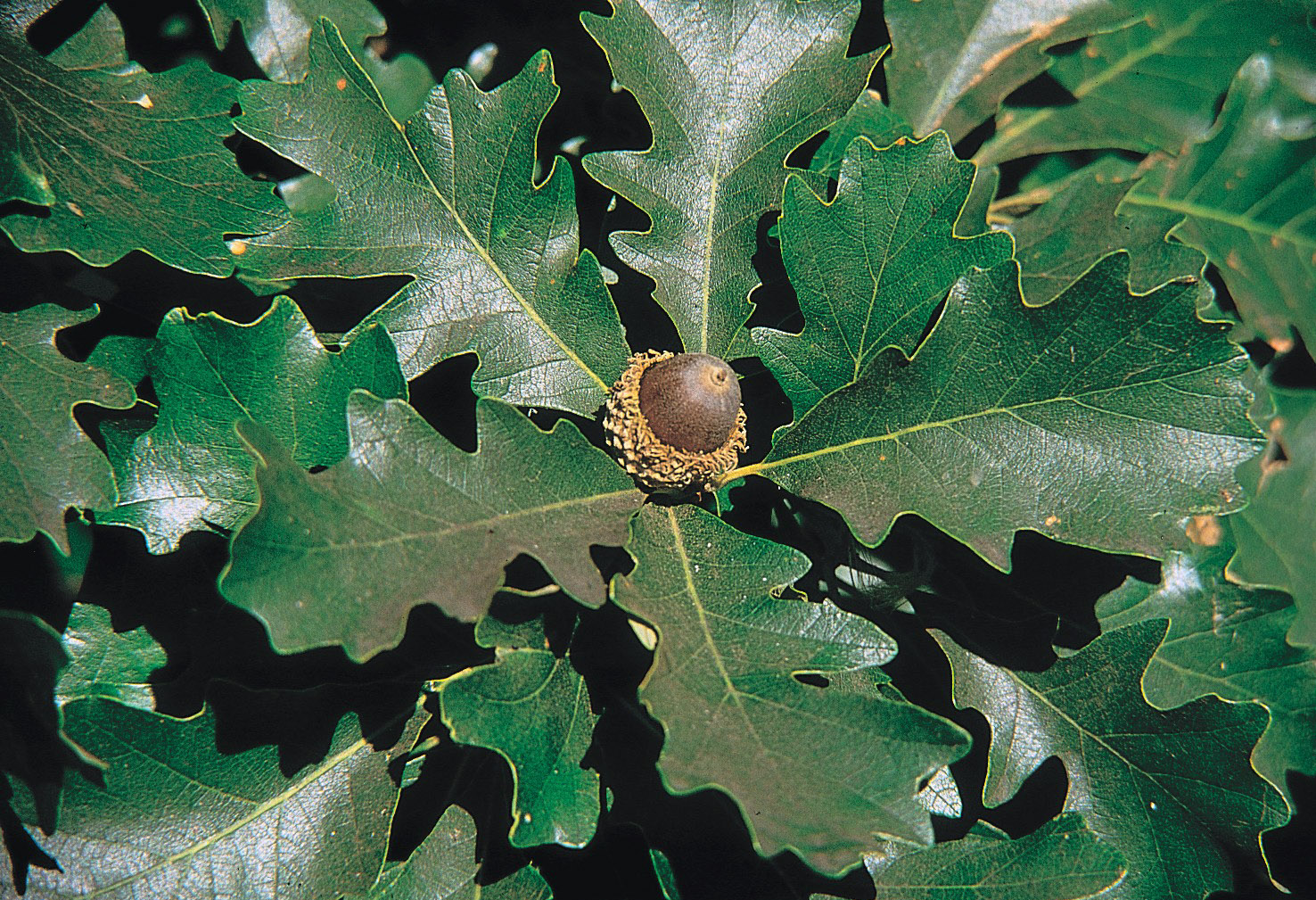
Leaves and acorn

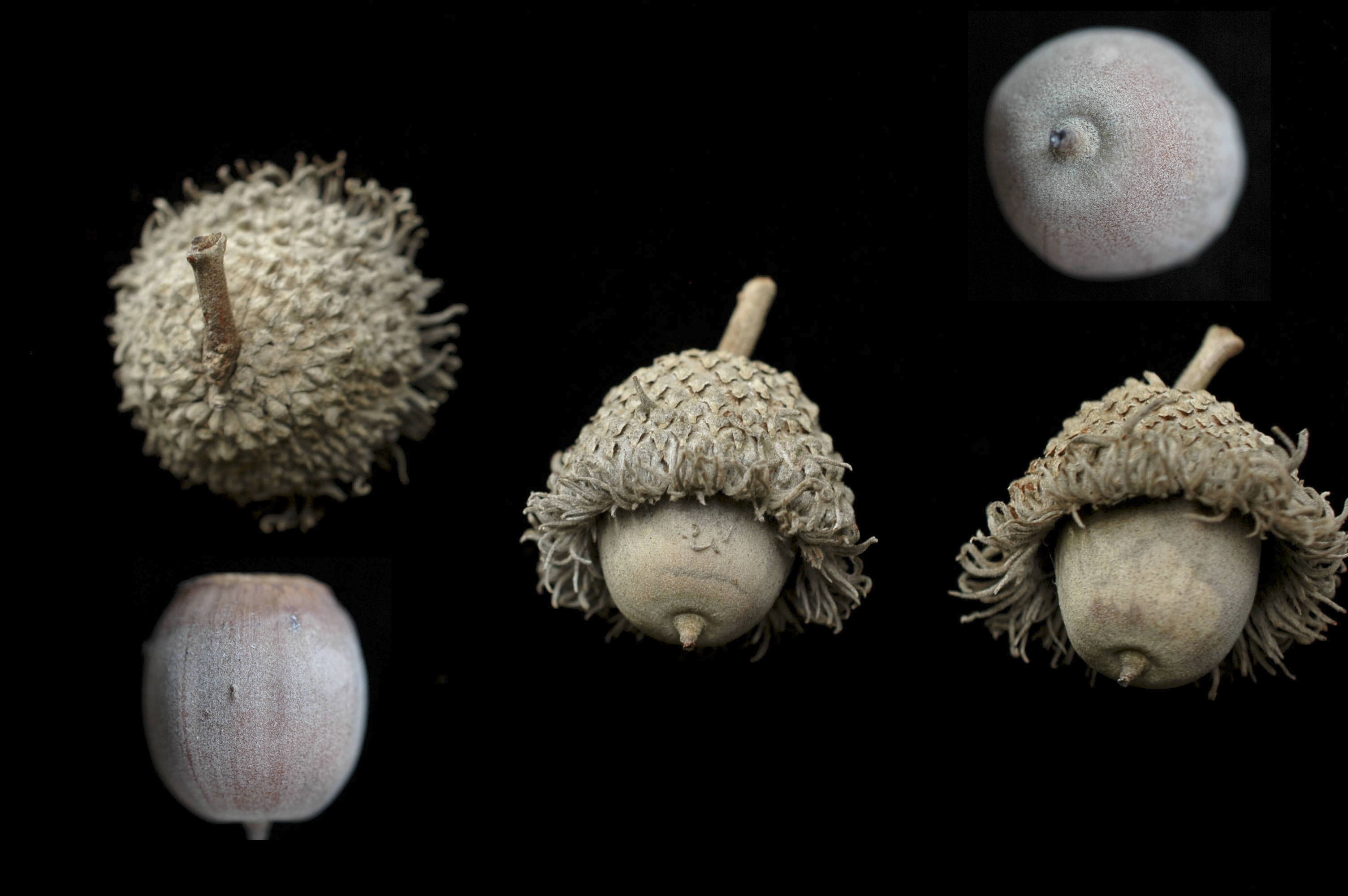
Acorns

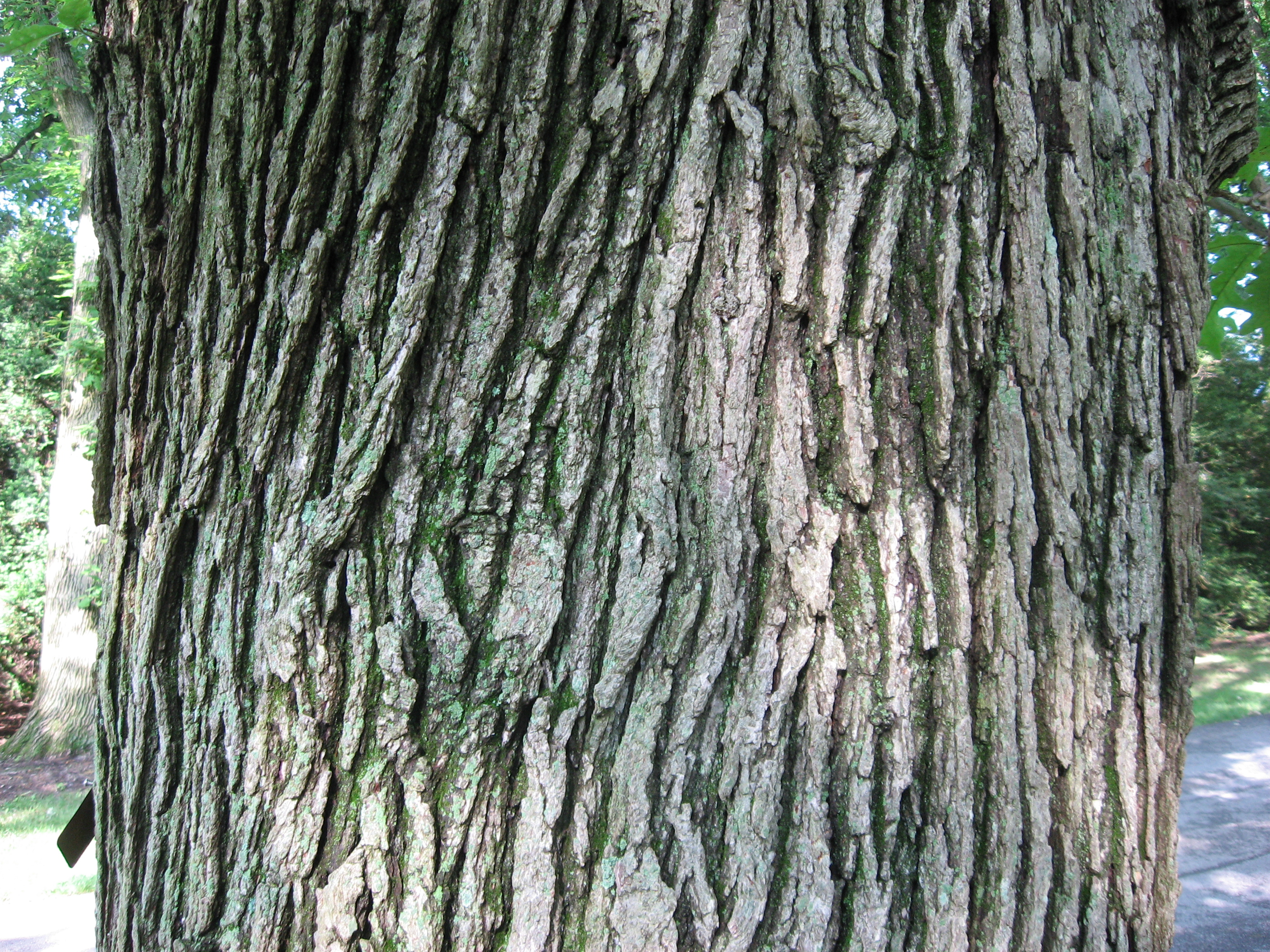
Bark

== Varieties ==
Two varieties are accepted in Kew's Plants of the World Online:

- Quercus macrocarpa var. macrocarpa
- Quercus macrocarpa var. depressa (Nutt.) Engelm.

== Distribution and habitat ==
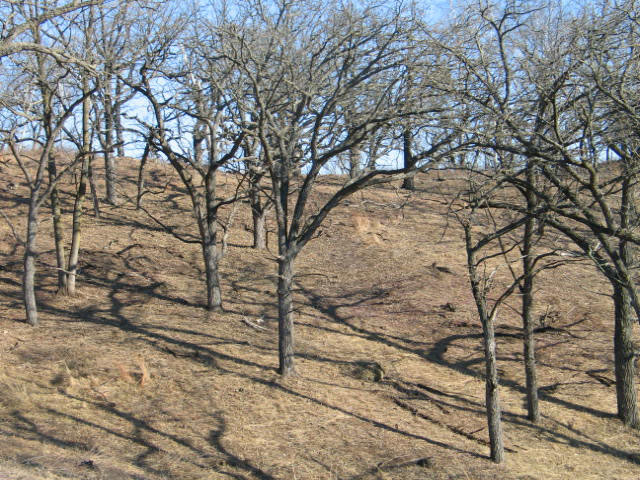
A bur oak savanna in Wisconsin hill country (the Driftless Area) in winter

Quercus macrocarpa is widespread in the Atlantic coastal plain from New Brunswick to North Carolina, west as far as Alberta, eastern Montana, Wyoming, and northeastern New Mexico. The vast majority of the populations are found in the eastern Great Plains, the Mississippi–Missouri–Ohio Valley, and the Great Lakes region. The bur oak's range extends farther north than any other North American oak, but the oak tends to be smaller and shrubby at the northern and eastern limits of its range.

Bur oaks primarily grow in a temperate climate on the western oak–hickory forested regions in the United States and into Canada. It commonly grows in the open, away from dense forest canopy. For this reason, it is an important tree on the eastern prairies, often found near waterways in otherwise more forested areas, where there is a break in the canopy. It is drought resistant, possibly because of its long taproot. At the end of the growing season, a one-year sapling may have a taproot 1.37 m (4 1/2 ft) deep and a lateral root spread of 76 cm (2 1/2 ft). The bur oak shows a preference for limestone or other calcareous soils. The West Virginia state champion bur oak has a trunk diameter of almost 3 m (10 ft).

Large bur oaks, older than 12 years, are fire-tolerant because of their thick bark. One of the bur oak's most common habitats, especially in Midwestern United States, is the oak savanna, where fires often occurred in early spring or late fall. Without fires, bur oak is often succeeded by other tree and shrub species that are more shade-tolerant. Older bur oaks may survive in dense woodlands for 80 years, until they are weakened by wood-rot fungi in the lower branches killed by shade, and by 100 to 110 years, they are often snapped by wind storms.

== Ecology ==
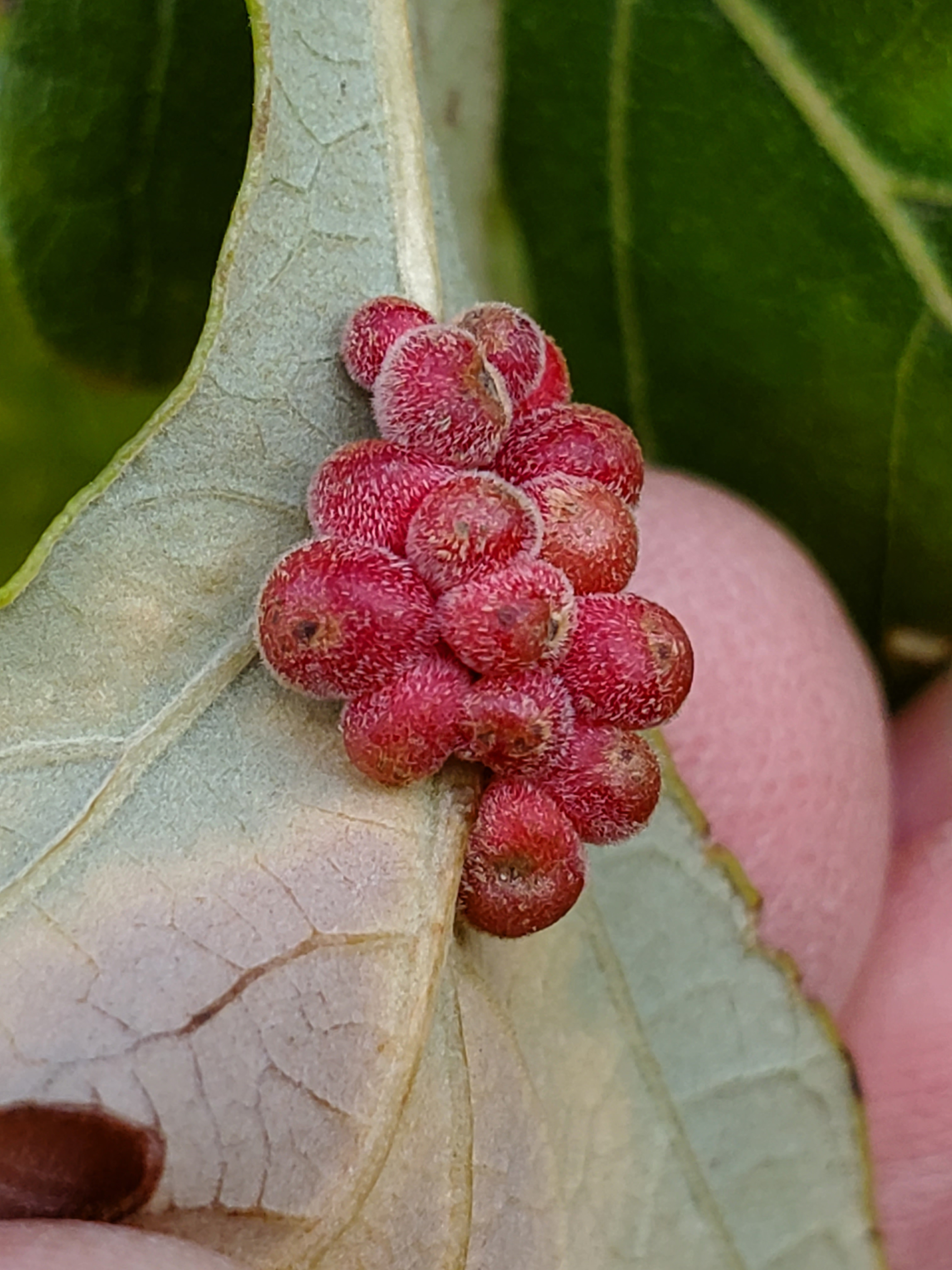
Andricus dimorphus gall

The acorns are the largest of any North American oak and are an important wildlife food; American black bears sometimes tear off branches to get them. However, heavy nut crops are borne only every few years. In this evolutionary strategy, known as masting, the large seed crop every few years overwhelms the ability of seed predators to eat the acorns, thus ensuring the survival of some seeds. Other wildlife, such as deer and porcupine, eat the leaves, twigs and bark. Cattle are heavy browsers in some areas. The bur oak is the only known host plant of Bucculatrix recognita caterpillars.

Many species of arthropods form galls on the leaves and twigs, including Aceria querci (a mite) and numerous cynipid wasps: Acraspis macrocarpae, Acraspis villosa, Andricus chinquapin, Andricus dimorphus, Andricus foliaformis, Andricus flavohirtus, Andricus quercuspetiolicola, Callirhytis flavipes, Disholcaspis quercusmamma, Neuroterus floccosus, Neuroterus saltarius, Neuroterus umbilicatus, Philonix nigra, and Phylloteras poculum.

=== Diseases ===
Bur oak blight is caused by a fungal pathogen Tubakia iowensis. It forms black pustules on the petioles and causes leaf discoloration and death, making the tree more susceptible to other secondary issues such as Armillaria root rot or Agrilus bilineatus (two-lined chestnut borer).

== Cultivation ==
Quercus macrocarpa is cultivated by plant nurseries for use in gardens, in parks, and on urban sidewalks. It has been planted in many climates, ranging northwards to Anchorage, Alaska, and as far south as Mission, Texas. It withstands chinook conditions in Calgary and also grows well in the more frosty environment of Banff. It is drought tolerant.

Coppicing has been shown to produce superior growth.

== Uses ==
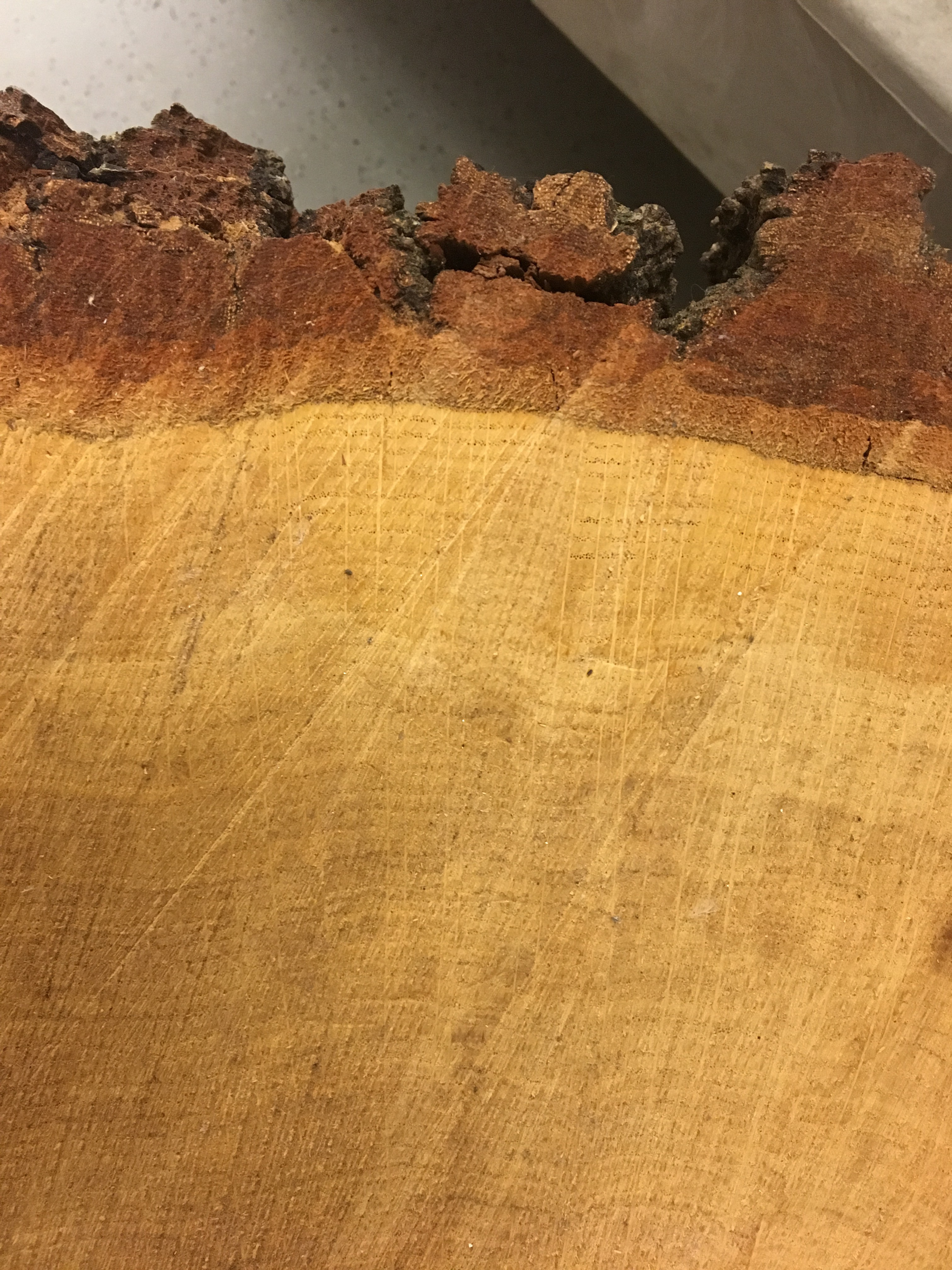
Wood showing growth rings

The wood of Quercus macrocarpa is commercially valuable; it is durable, used for flooring, fence posts, cabinets, and barrels. The acorns can be eaten boiled and raw. Native Americans have used the astringent bark to treat wounds, sores, rashes, and diarrhea.

== Culture ==
Many places are named after the burr oak, such as Burr Oak State Park in Ohio, the cities of Burr Oak, Iowa and Burr Oak, Kansas, and the village of Burr Oak, Michigan. Burr Oaks (1947) is a volume of poetry by Richard Eberhart.
