= Columbia Insurance Group =

Group of five property and casualty insurance companies

Columbia Insurance
- Type: Mutual
- Industry: Insurance
- Founded: 1874
- Headquarters: Columbia, Missouri, USA
- Key people: Todd Ruthruff, Chairman & CEO
- Number of employees: Over 325
- Website: www.columbiainsurance.com/

Columbia Mutual Insurance Company is the parent company of a group of five property and casualty insurance companies operating as Columbia Insurance. The group of companies primarily focus on insuring commercial business. The company is licensed in 30 states, with policyholders in 19 states. Columbia Insurance exclusively markets its insurance products through the independent insurance agency system. The corporate headquarters is in Columbia, Missouri. The company has branch offices in Austin, Texas, Atlanta, Georgia, and Omaha, Nebraska.

The five entities operating as Columbia Insurance are: Association Casualty Insurance Company, Citizens Mutual Insurance Company, Columbia Mutual Insurance Company, Columbia National Insurance Company, and Georgia Casualty & Surety Company.
