= Public Safety Joint Communications Center =

The Columbia/Boone County Public Safety Joint Communications Center (PSJC) is the agency that provides enhanced 911 call-taking and dispatch services for Boone County, Missouri. The PSJC dispatches fifteen agencies to approximately 304,000 incidents a year, with over 69,800 being 911 calls.

== History ==
The Columbia/Boone County Public Safety Joint Communications Center has been in existence since 1977. From a modest beginning, in which communications assets of four agencies were donated to begin operation as a joint communications center, the organization has undergone many changes. In 1983, work was begun on a majo upgrade to the original center. Renovations included replacing the outdated radio consoles in the pre-existing center with new consoles and radios, duplicating each console for future expansion. A radar system was installed to better assist in tracking weather and a separate console was installed for ham radio operators to staff during disaster situations.

The enhanced 9-1-1 (E-911) system was installed in the fall of 1986. The funds for the system were provided by a tax bill, with each tax payer in Boone County paying approximately $2.25 additional on their phone bill to pay for the system. This system allows each 9-1-1 call to automatically be traced to the location it originated from. It also allowed for special information about that location such as directions, medical related information, or any information the resident feels is important to immediately be available for the operator receiving the call.

A new CAD (Computer-Aided Dispatch) computer was placed on line on September 21, 1993. The new system allows both fire and medical calls to be dispatched by computer as well as law calls. The CAD was also integrated with the 9-1-1 system the Missouri Uniform Law Enforcement System (MULES). This made PSJC a completely automated center.

In the spring of 1999 a mobile data terminal system was installed allowing placement of lap top computer terminals in Columbia Police Department, Columbia Fire Department, and Boone County Fire District vehicles that are linked to the dispatch computer mainframe at the Communications Center. In 2004 an integrated GIS mapping system that automatically maps 911 calls was installed and placed online.

In 2000, the current Columbia/Boone County Public Safety Joint Communications Center was built, sitting at the corner of Seventh and Walnut streets, in the same building as the Columbia Police Department's headquarters.

In October 2009, Zim Schwartze, a Columbia Police Department captain, was selected to head the Public Safety/Joint Communications Center. Captain Schwartze had headed the 911 call center on an interim basis since the former director Jim McNabb stepped down in May.

== Training ==
Trainees receive 6 months of training, receiving American Heart Association Certification in CPR and obtaining certification as Emergency Medical Dispatchers. Each trainee also receives certification from the Missouri Highway Patrol-Missouri Uniform Law Enforcement System (MULES), and several other dispatch programs.

Upon completion of classroom training, they are assigned to a field training officer to complete their training.

== User agencies ==
- Office of Emergency Management
- Ashland Police Department
- Boone County Fire Protection District
- Boone County Sheriff's Department
- Boone Hospital Center Ambulance
- Capital Region Ambulance Service
- Centralia Fire Department
- Columbia Fire Department
- Columbia Police Department
- University of Missouri Police Department (911 call-taking services only. The University of Missouri handles a high call volume and therefore has their own dispatch center)
- Hallsville Police Department
- Southern Boone County Fire Protection District
- Sturgeon Police Department
- University Hospital Ambulance Service
