= Columbia, Missouri =

City in Missouri, U.S.

- City
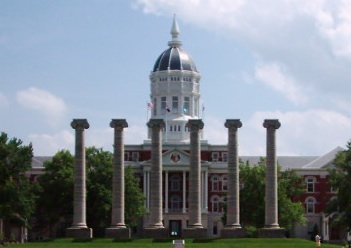
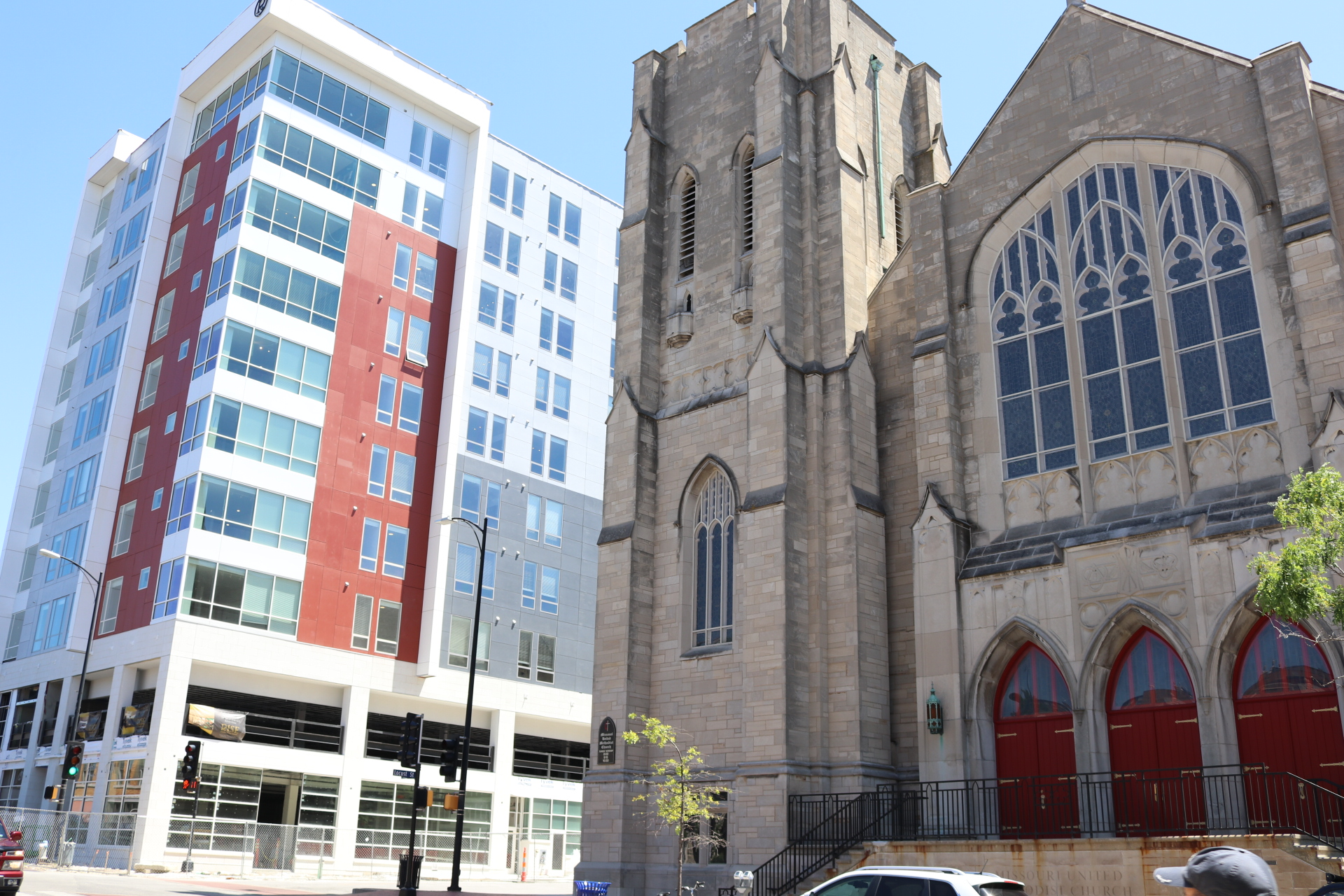
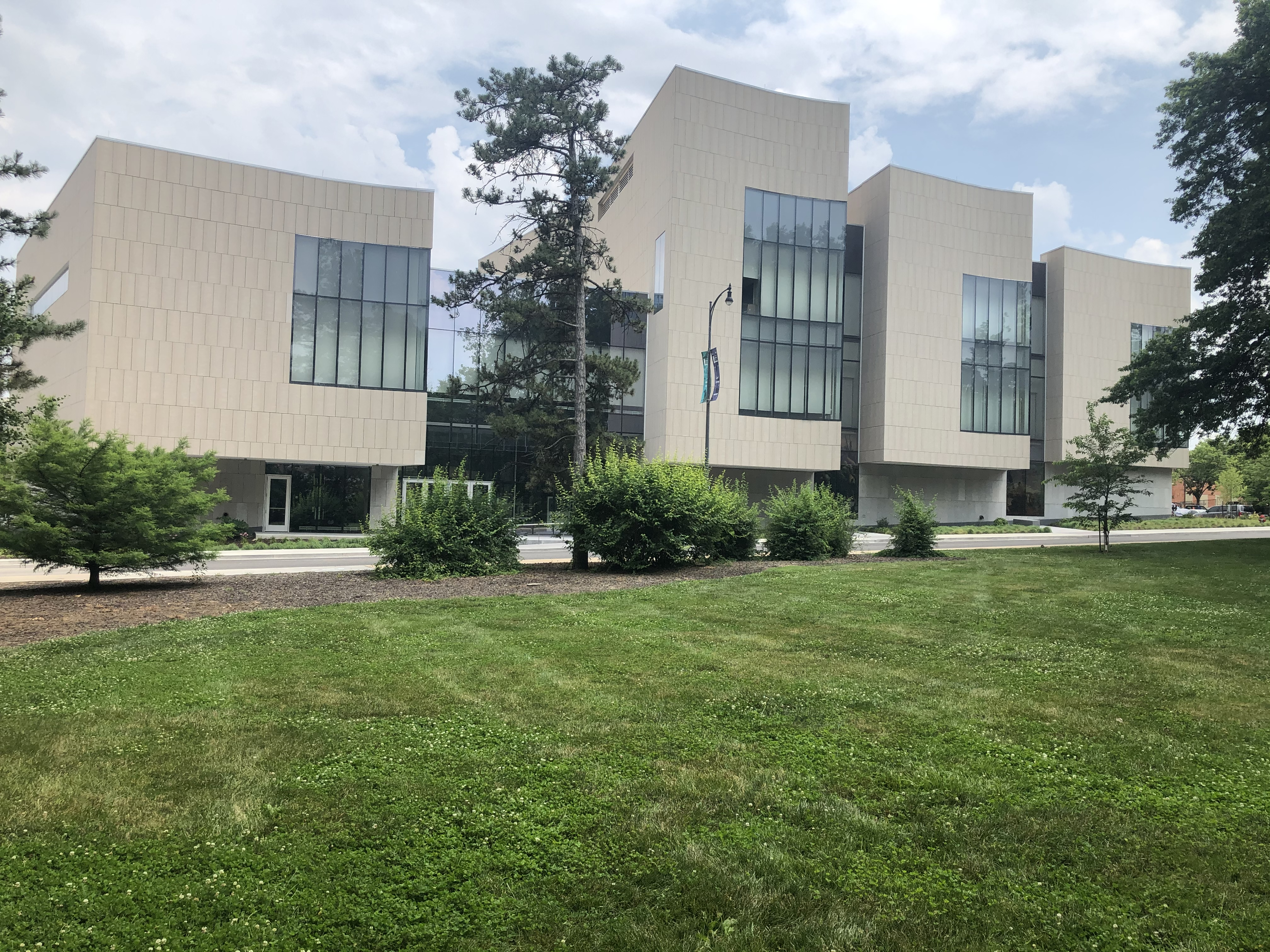
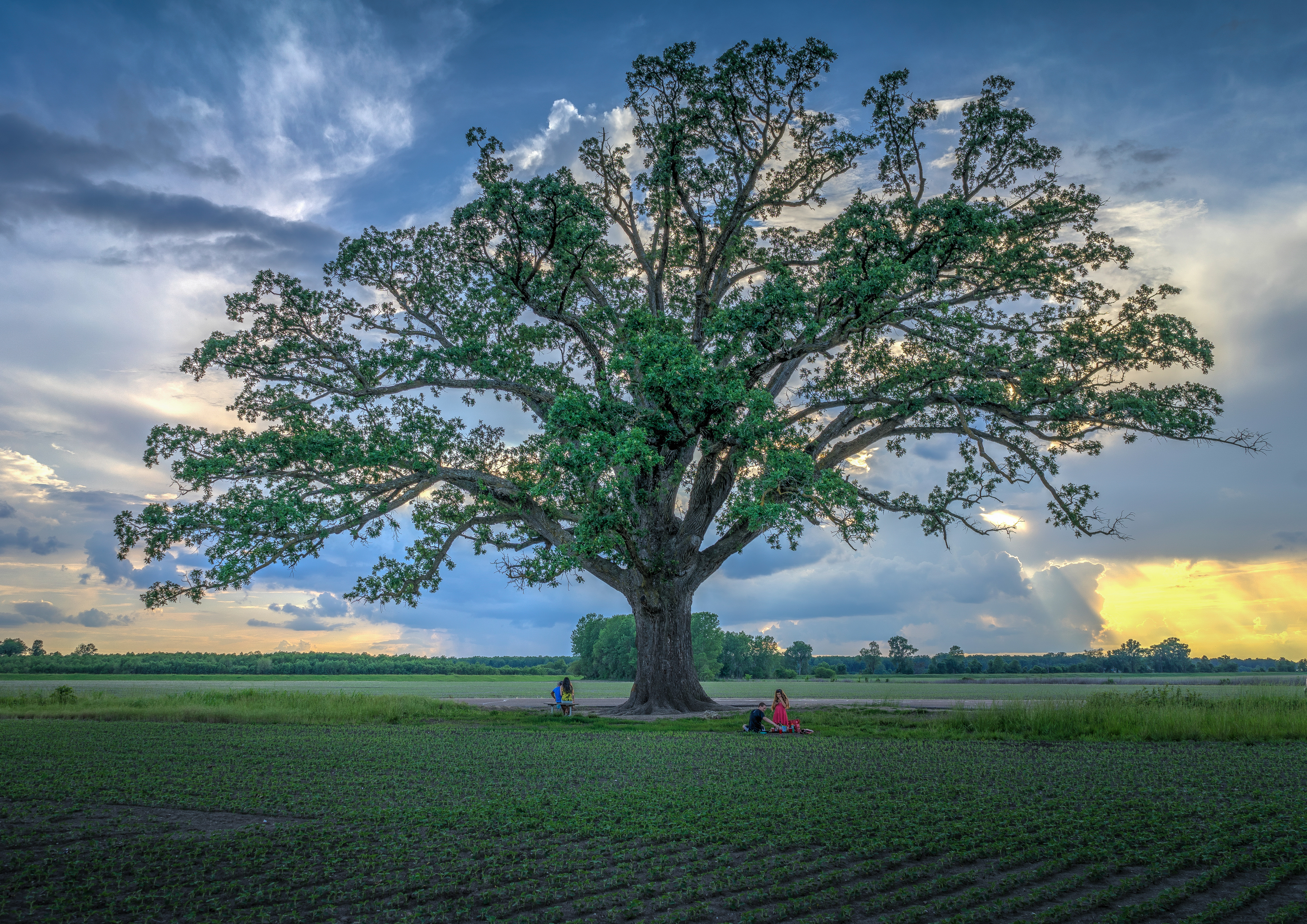
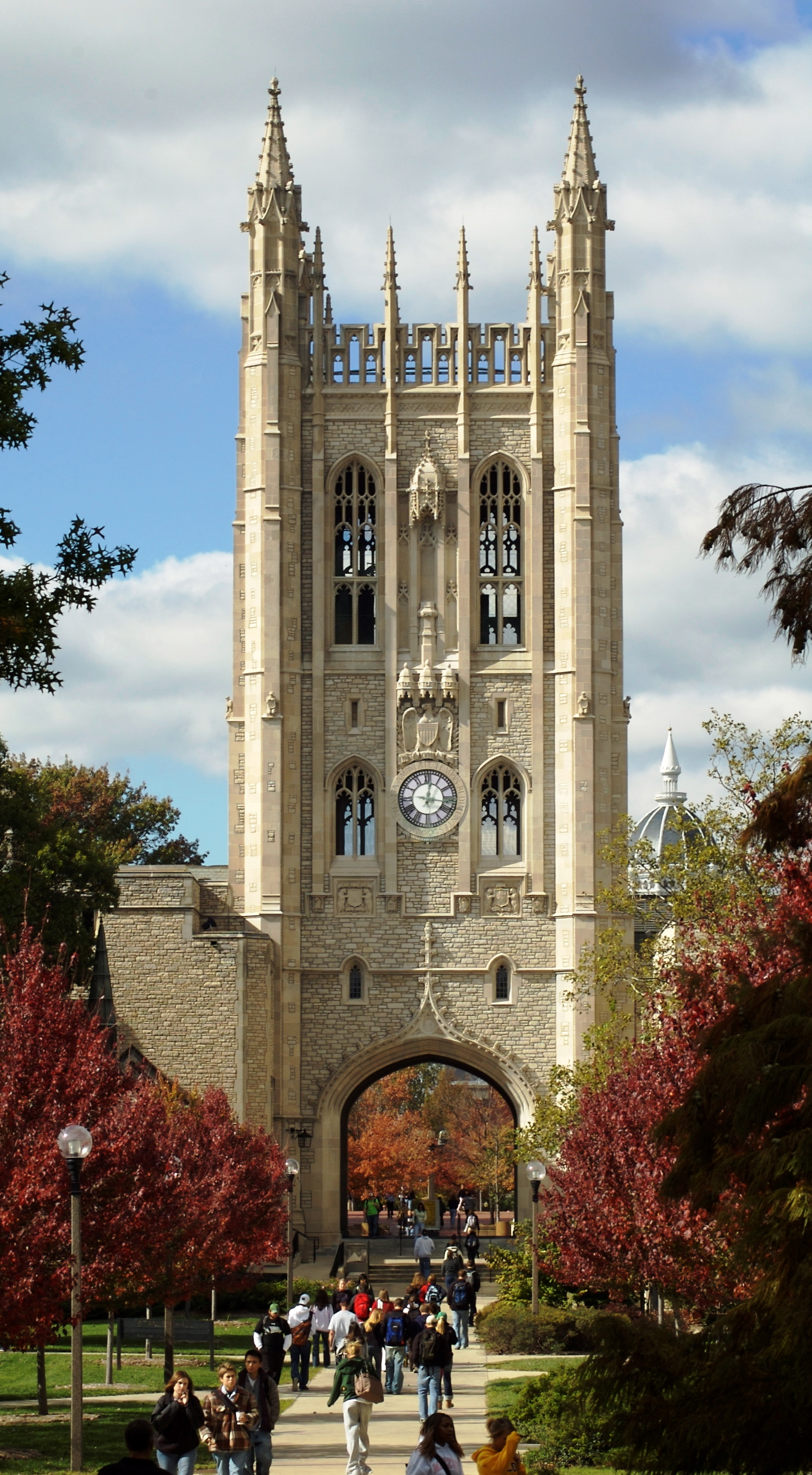
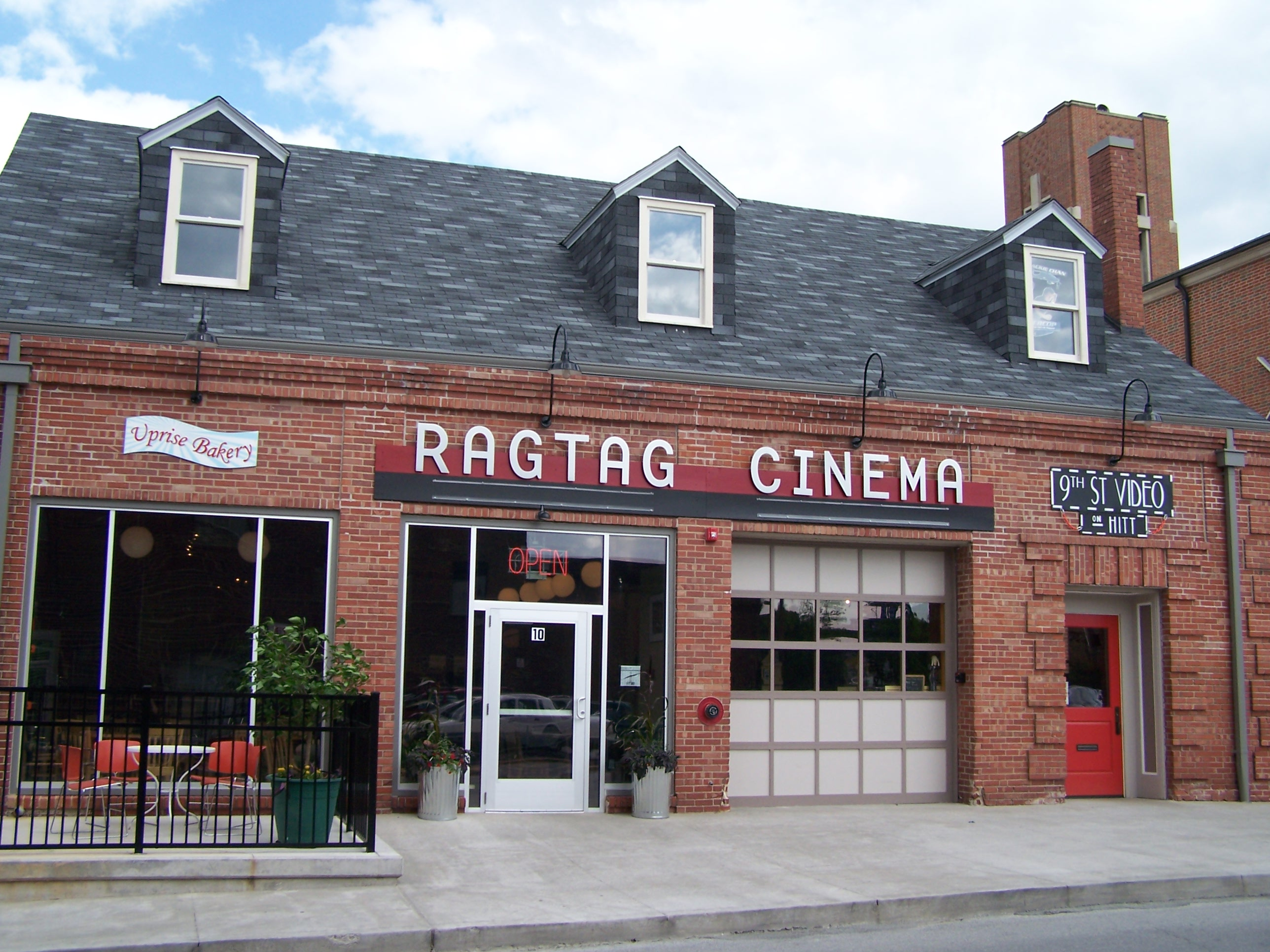
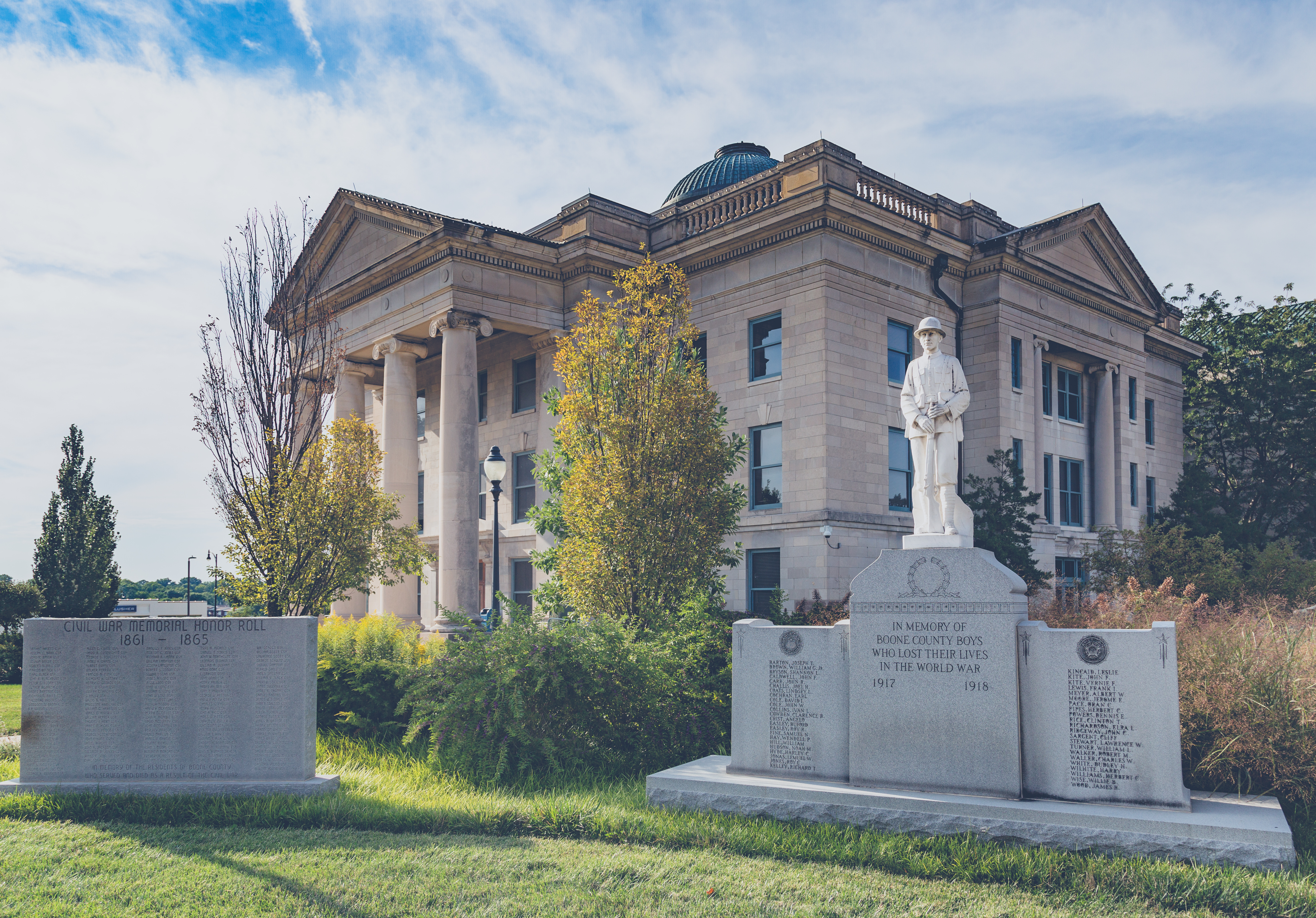
- Jesse Hall and The Columns at the University of Missouri Missouri United Methodist Church State Historical Society of Missouri The Big Tree Memorial Union Ragtag Cinema Boone County Courthouse

- Flag Seal
- Nicknames: "The Athens of Missouri", or CoMo
- Interactive map of Columbia, Missouri
- Location within Missouri Location within the contiguous U.S.
- Coordinates: 38°56′51″N 92°19′36″W
- Country: United States
- State: Missouri
- County: Boone
- Founded: 1821; 205 years ago
- Incorporated: 1826
- Named for: Columbia

Government
  - Type: Council–manager
  - Body: Columbia City Council
  - Mayor: Barbara Buffaloe
  - City manager: De'Carlon Seewood

Area
  - Total: 67.45 sq mi (174.70 km^{2})
  - Land: 67.17 sq mi (173.98 km^{2})
  - Water: 0.28 sq mi (0.72 km^{2})
- Elevation: 761 ft (232 m)

Population (2020)
  - Total: 126,254
  - Estimate (2024): 130,900
  - Rank: US: 222nd MO: 4th
  - Density: 1,879.5/sq mi (725.67/km^{2})
  - Metro: 210,864 (216th)
  - CSA: 410,851 (102nd)
- Demonym: Columbian
- Time zone: UTC−6 (CST)
  - Summer (DST): UTC−5 (CDT)
- ZIP Codes: 65201, 65202, 65203, 65211
- Area code: 573
- FIPS code: 29-15670
- GNIS feature ID: 2393605
- Website: como.gov

Columbia is a city in Boone County, Missouri, United States, and its county seat. It was founded in 1821 and had a population of 126,254 as recorded in the 2020 United States census, making it the fourth-most-populous city in Missouri. Columbia is a Midwestern college town, home to the University of Missouri, a major research institution also known as MU or Mizzou. In addition to the university and surrounding downtown Columbia are Stephens College and Columbia College, giving the city its educational focus and nearly 40,000 college students. It is the principal city of the Columbia metropolitan area, population 215,811, and the central city of the nine-county Columbia–Jefferson City–Moberly combined statistical area, with 415,747 residents. The city is the fastest-growing municipality in Missouri, with a growth of almost 40% since 2000, and a population estimated at 130,900 in 2024. Columbia is among the most-educated cities in the United States, with about half of citizens being college graduates and about a quarter holding advanced degrees.

The city is built on the oak-forested hills and rolling prairies of Mid-Missouri, near the Missouri River, where the Ozark Mountains transition into plains and savanna. At the city's center is the Avenue of the Columns (8th Street), connecting Francis Quadrangle and Jesse Hall to the Boone County Courthouse and City Hall. Surrounding Columbia is a greenbelt that includes Rock Bridge Memorial State Park, Eagle Bluffs Conservation Area, Mark Twain National Forest, Katy Trail State Park, Finger Lakes State Park, and Big Muddy National Fish and Wildlife Refuge. Limestone bedrock forms bluffs and glades, while rain dissolves the bedrock, creating karst (caves and springs), which water the Hinkson, Roche Perche, Flat Branch, and Bonne Femme Creeks. Within city limits, an extensive city parks and trails system focuses on nonmotorized transportation, including the MKT Trail. The Columbia Agriculture Park is home to the nationally regarded Columbia Farmers Market.

Originally an agricultural town, education and healthcare are now Columbia's primary economic concerns, with secondary interests in the insurance, finance, and technology sectors. Companies founded in Columbia include: Carfax, Shelter Insurance, Veterans United Home Loans, MFA Incorporated, MFA Oil, Slackers CDs and Games, MidwayUSA, EquipmentShare, and Scripps News. The University of Missouri Health Care system operates six hospitals in Columbia, several clinics, and the Thompson Center for Autism and Neurodevelopment. The city also has the county-owned Boone Hospital Center, several smaller private hospitals, and the Harry S. Truman Memorial Veterans' Hospital, adjacent to University Hospital and MU School of Medicine. The University of Missouri nuclear reactor is the most-powerful research reactor in the United States and the sole supplier of important radioisotopes used in nuclear medicine.

Cultural institutions include the State Historical Society of Missouri, the Museum of Art and Archaeology, the Missouri Symphony, the North Village Arts District, The Blue Note, the Missouri Theatre, the Conservatory of the Performing Arts at Stephens College, Boone County Historical Society, Columbia Public Library, Ragtag Cinema, and the annual True/False Film Festival, an internationally known documentary festival. The Missouri Tigers, the state's only major college athletic program, play football at Faurot Field and basketball at Mizzou Arena as members of the Southeastern Conference. The city has been known as the "Athens of Missouri" for its educational emphasis and classic beauty, but is more commonly called "CoMo".

== History ==
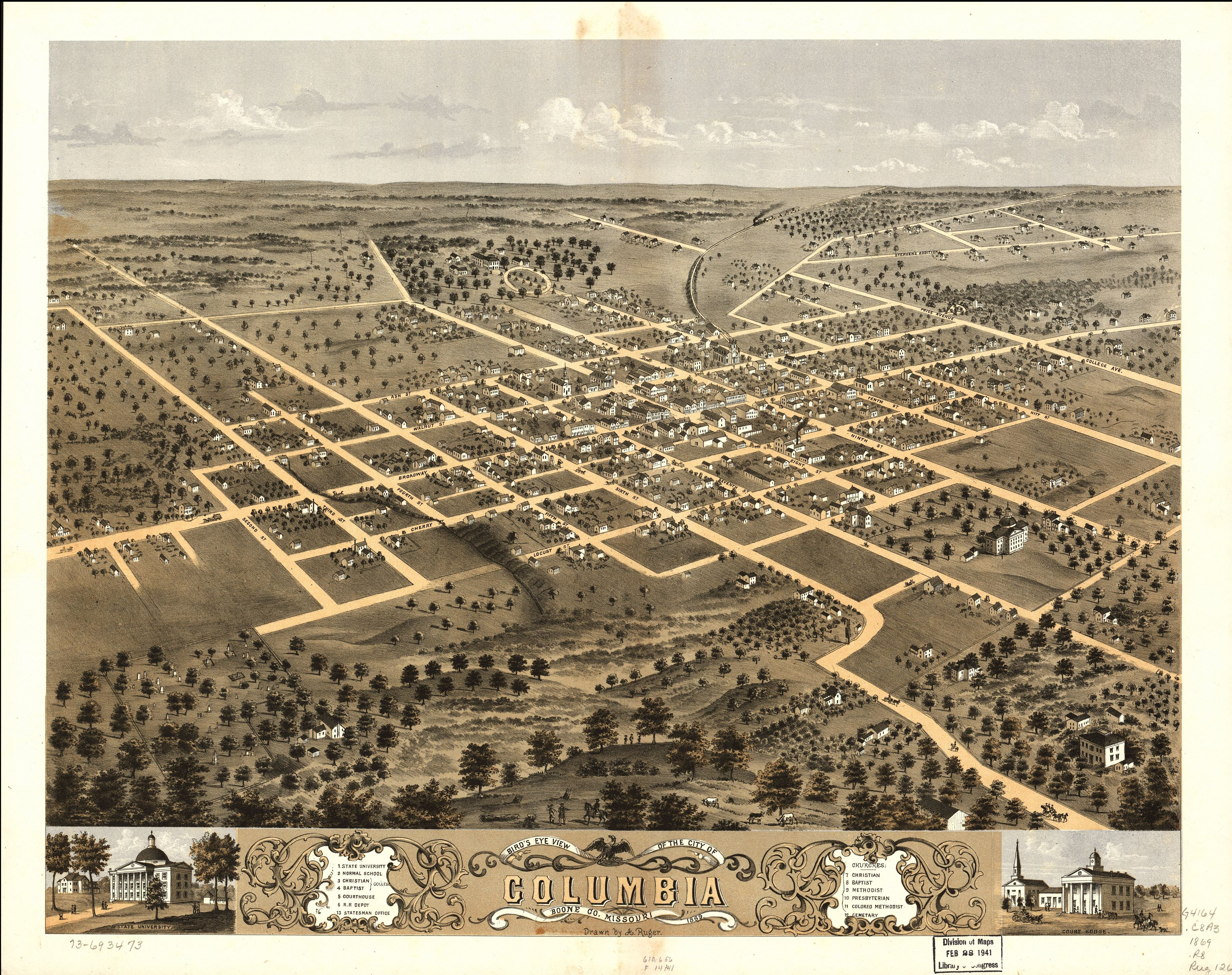
An aerial depiction of Columbia's downtown district in 1869: The large building on the right is University of Missouri Academic Hall.

Columbia's origins begin with the settlement of American pioneers from Kentucky and Virginia in an early 1800s region known as the Boonslick. Before 1815, settlement in the region was confined to small log forts due to the threat of Native American attack during the War of 1812. When the war ended, settlers came on foot, horseback, and wagon, often moving entire households along the Boone's Lick Road and often bringing enslaved African Americans. By 1818, the increased population clearly would necessitate a new county be created from territorial Howard County. The Moniteau Creek on the west and Cedar Creek on the east were obvious natural boundaries.

Believing it was only a matter of time before a county seat was chosen, the Smithton Land Company was formed to purchase over 2,000 acres (8.1 km^{2}) to establish the village of Smithton (near the present-day intersection of Walnut and Garth). In 1819, Smithton was a small cluster of log cabins in an ancient forest of oak and hickory; chief among them was the cabin of Richard Gentry, a trustee of the Smithton Company, who would become first mayor of Columbia. In 1820, Boone County was formed and named after the recently deceased explorer Daniel Boone. The Missouri Legislature appointed John Gray, Jefferson Fulcher, Absalom Hicks, Lawrence Bass, and David Jackson as commissioners to select and establish a permanent county seat. Smithton never had more than 20 people, and well digging was soon found to be difficult because of the bedrock.

Springs were discovered across the Flat Branch Creek, so in the spring of 1821, Columbia was laid out, and the inhabitants of Smithton moved their cabins to the new town. The first house in Columbia was built by Thomas Duly in 1820 at what became Fifth and Broadway. Columbia's permanence was ensured when it was chosen as county seat in 1821, and Boone's Lick Road was rerouted down Broadway.

The roots of Columbia's three economic foundations—education, medicine, and insurance— can be traced to the city's incorporation in 1821. Original plans for the town set aside land for a state university. In 1833, Columbia Baptist Female College opened, which later became Stephens College. Columbia College, distinct from today's and later to become the University of Missouri, was founded in 1839. When the state legislature decided to establish a state university, Columbia raised three times as much money as any competing city, and James S. Rollins donated the land that is today the Francis Quadrangle. Soon, other educational institutions were founded in Columbia, such as Christian Female College, the first college for women west of the Mississippi, which later became Columbia College.

The city benefited from being a stagecoach stop of the Santa Fe and Oregon Trails, and later from the Missouri–Kansas–Texas Railroad. In 1822, William Jewell set up the first hospital. In 1830, the first newspaper began; in 1832, the first theater in the state was opened; and in 1835, the state's first agricultural fair was held. By 1839, the population of 13,000 and wealth of Boone County was exceeded in Missouri only by that of St. Louis County, which, at that time, included the City of St. Louis.

The first movie shown in Columbia was screened in the Haden Opera House.

Columbia's infrastructure was relatively untouched by the Civil War. As a slave state, Missouri had many residents with Southern sympathies, but it stayed in the Union. The majority of the city was pro-Union; however, the surrounding agricultural areas of Boone County and the rest of central Missouri were decidedly pro-Confederate. Because of this, the University of Missouri became a base from which Union troops operated. No battles were fought within the city because the presence of Union troops dissuaded Confederate guerrillas from attacking, though several major battles occurred at nearby Boonville and Centralia.

After Reconstruction, race relations in Columbia followed the Southern pattern of increasing violence of whites against blacks in efforts to suppress voting and free movement; George Burke, a black man who worked at the university, was lynched in 1889. In the spring of 1923, James T. Scott, an African-American janitor at the University of Missouri, was arrested on allegations of raping a university professor's daughter. He was taken from the county jail and lynched on April 29 before a white mob of roughly 2000 people, hanged from the Old Stewart Road Bridge.

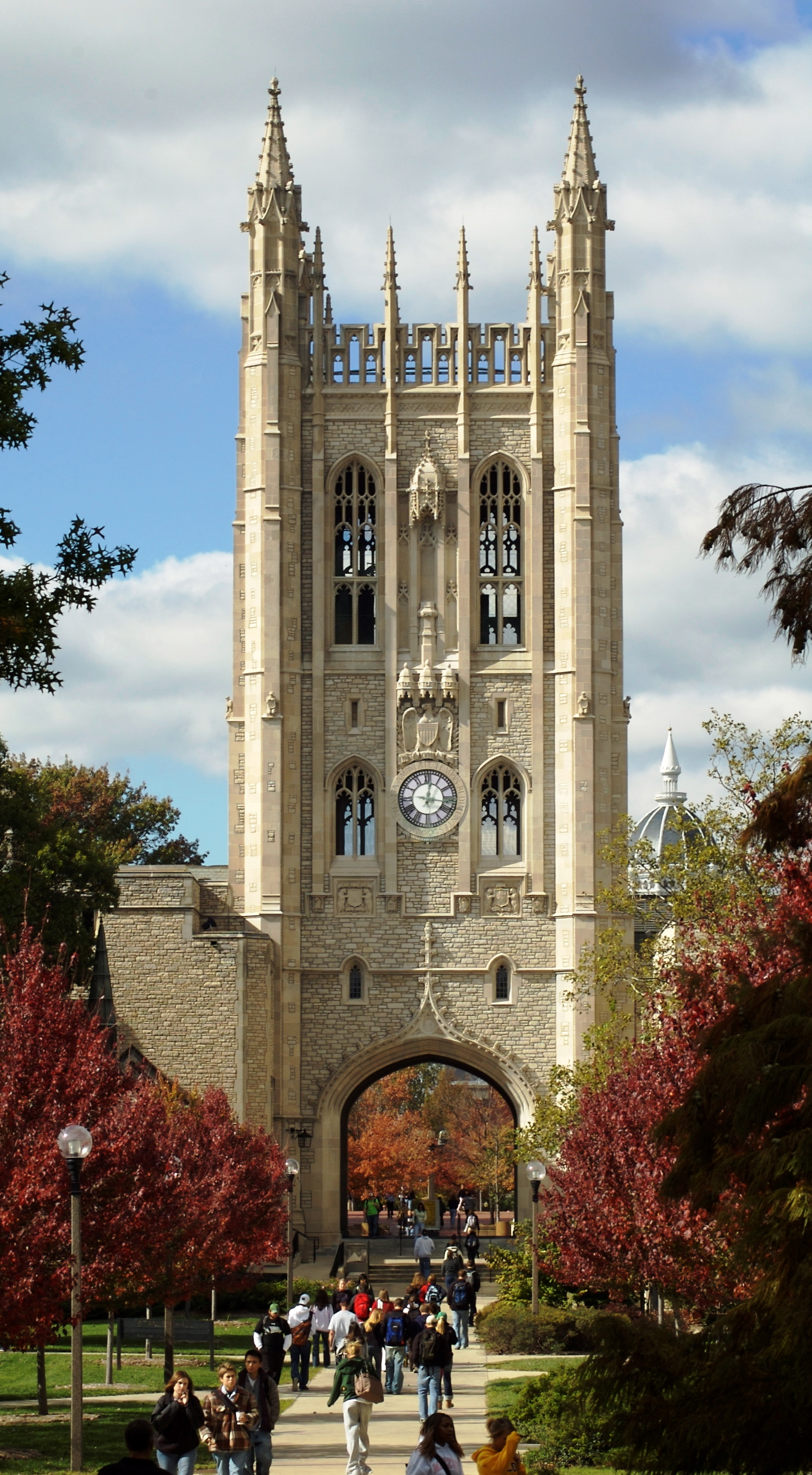
The Memorial Union at the University of Missouri

In the 21st century, a number of efforts have been undertaken to recognize Scott's death. In 2010, his death certificate was changed to reflect that he was never tried or convicted of charges, and that he had been lynched. In 2011, a headstone was put at his grave at Columbia Cemetery; it includes his wife and parents' names and dates, to provide a fuller account of his life. In 2016, a marker was erected at the lynching site to memorialize Scott. 5 years later, in 2021, the marker was removed in an act of vandalism. In 1901, Rufus Logan established The Columbia Professional newspaper to serve Columbia's large African American population.

In 1963, University of Missouri System and the Columbia College system established their headquarters in Columbia. The insurance industry also became important to the local economy as several companies established headquarters in Columbia, including Shelter Insurance, Missouri Employers Mutual, and Columbia Insurance Group. State Farm Insurance has a regional office in Columbia. In addition, the now-defunct Silvey Insurance was a large local employer.

Columbia became a transportation crossroads when U.S. Route 63 and U.S. Route 40 (which was improved as present-day Interstate 70) were routed through the city. Soon after, the city opened the Columbia Regional Airport. By 2000, the city's population was nearly 85,000.

In 2017, Columbia was in the path of totality for the solar eclipse of August 21, 2017. The city was expecting upwards of 400,000 tourists coming to view the eclipse.

On April 20, 2025, an EF1 tornado formed in Columbia caused minor damage to downtown Columbia and residential areas, and destroyed the recycling sorting facility, which could take two to three years to rebuild. Shortly after, the city announced that recycling would go to the landfill until a solution get worked out.

== Geography ==
Columbia, in northern mid-Missouri, is 120 miles (190 km) away from both St. Louis and Kansas City, and 29 miles (47 km) north of the state capital of Jefferson City. The city is near the Missouri River, between the Ozark Plateau and the Northern Plains.

According to the United States Census Bureau, the city has a total area of 67.45 square miles (174.69 km^{2}), of which 0.28 sq mi (0.73 km^{2}) is covered by water.

=== Topography ===
The city generally slopes from the highest point in the northeast to the lowest point in the southwest towards the Missouri River. Prominent tributaries of the river are Perche Creek, Hinkson Creek, and Flat Branch Creek. Along these and other creeks in the area can be found large valleys, cliffs, and cave systems such as that in Rock Bridge State Park just south of the city. These creeks are largely responsible for numerous stream valleys, giving Columbia hilly terrain similar to the Ozarks while also having prairie flatland typical of northern Missouri. Columbia also operates several greenbelts with trails and parks throughout town.

=== Animal life ===
Large mammals found in the city include urbanized coyotes, red foxes, and numerous whitetail deer. Eastern gray squirrels and other rodents are abundant, as are cottontail rabbits and nocturnal opossums and raccoons. Large bird species are abundant in parks and include Canada geese, mallard ducks, and shorebirds, including great egrets and great blue herons. Turkeys are also common in wooded areas and can occasionally be seen on the MKT recreation trail. Populations of bald eagles are found by the Missouri River. The city is on the Mississippi Flyway, used by migrating birds, and has a large variety of small bird species, common to the Eastern U.S. The Eurasian tree sparrow, an introduced species, is limited in North America to the counties surrounding St. Louis. Columbia has large areas of forested and open land, and many of these areas are home to wildlife.

The Devil's Icebox Cave in Columbia's Rock Bridge State Park is the only natural home of the planarian Kenkia glandulosa, an eyeless and unpigmented flatworm. The cave is also home to species of salamanders, frogs, troglobites, millipedes, spiders, bats, and springtails.

=== Climate ===
Columbia has a humid continental climate (Köppen Dfa), marked by sharp seasonal contrasts in temperature, and is in USDA plant hardiness zone 6B. The monthly daily average temperature ranges from 31.0 °F (−0.6 °C) in January to 78.5 °F (25.8 °C) in July, while the high reaches or exceeds 90 °F (32 °C) on an average of 35 days per year, 100 °F (38 °C) on two days, while two nights of sub-0 °F (−18 °C) lows can be expected. Precipitation tends to be greatest and most frequent in the latter half of spring, when severe weather also is most common. Snow averages 16.5 inches (42 cm) per season, mostly from December to March, with occasional November accumulation and falls in April being rarer; historically seasonal snow accumulation has ranged from 3.4 in (8.6 cm) in 2005–06 to 54.9 in (139 cm) in 1977–78. Extreme temperatures have ranged from −26 °F (−32 °C) on February 12, 1899, to 113 °F (45 °C) on July 12 and 14, 1954. Readings of −10 °F (−23 °C) or 105 °F (41 °C) are uncommon, the last occurrences being January 7, 2014, and July 31, 2012.

Climate data for Columbia Regional Airport, Missouri (1991–2020 normals, (Note: Mean monthly maxima and minima (i.e. the highest and lowest temperature readings during an entire month or year) calculated based on data at said location from 1991 to 2020.) extremes 1889–present) (Note: Official records for Columbia kept at downtown from August 1889 to December 1947, Columbia Municipal Airport from January 1948 to October 1969 and at Columbia Regional Airport since November 1969.)
Month	Jan	Feb	Mar	Apr	May	Jun	Jul	Aug	Sep	Oct	Nov	Dec	Year
Record high °F (°C)	77 (25)	82 (28)	93 (34)	93 (34)	101 (38)	107 (42)	113 (45)	110 (43)	104 (40)	96 (36)	84 (29)	76 (24)	113 (45)
Mean maximum °F (°C)	63.1 (17.3)	69.9 (21.1)	78.8 (26.0)	84.8 (29.3)	87.9 (31.1)	93.0 (33.9)	97.1 (36.2)	97.8 (36.6)	91.6 (33.1)	85.0 (29.4)	74.0 (23.3)	66.3 (19.1)	99.4 (37.4)
Mean daily maximum °F (°C)	39.5 (4.2)	45.1 (7.3)	56.3 (13.5)	67.2 (19.6)	75.9 (24.4)	84.5 (29.2)	88.5 (31.4)	87.7 (30.9)	80.1 (26.7)	68.2 (20.1)	54.7 (12.6)	43.6 (6.4)	65.9 (18.8)
Daily mean °F (°C)	31.0 (−0.6)	35.7 (2.1)	46.0 (7.8)	56.4 (13.6)	65.8 (18.8)	74.6 (23.7)	78.5 (25.8)	77.2 (25.1)	69.2 (20.7)	57.5 (14.2)	45.3 (7.4)	35.2 (1.8)	56.0 (13.3)
Mean daily minimum °F (°C)	22.5 (−5.3)	26.4 (−3.1)	35.6 (2.0)	45.6 (7.6)	55.7 (13.2)	64.7 (18.2)	68.5 (20.3)	66.7 (19.3)	58.3 (14.6)	46.8 (8.2)	36.0 (2.2)	26.7 (−2.9)	46.1 (7.8)
Mean minimum °F (°C)	0.4 (−17.6)	5.4 (−14.8)	14.7 (−9.6)	28.6 (−1.9)	39.9 (4.4)	52.2 (11.2)	57.9 (14.4)	55.8 (13.2)	42.1 (5.6)	29.2 (−1.6)	17.3 (−8.2)	6.7 (−14.1)	−3.4 (−19.7)
Record low °F (°C)	−20 (−29)	−26 (−32)	−9 (−23)	14 (−10)	28 (−2)	40 (4)	45 (7)	40 (4)	26 (−3)	19 (−7)	−3 (−19)	−23 (−31)	−26 (−32)
Average precipitation inches (mm)	2.12 (54)	2.12 (54)	2.97 (75)	4.88 (124)	4.77 (121)	4.23 (107)	4.13 (105)	4.14 (105)	3.83 (97)	3.47 (88)	2.68 (68)	2.09 (53)	41.43 (1,052)
Average snowfall inches (cm)	6.0 (15)	4.6 (12)	1.5 (3.8)	0.2 (0.51)	0.0 (0.0)	0.0 (0.0)	0.0 (0.0)	0.0 (0.0)	0.0 (0.0)	0.0 (0.0)	0.8 (2.0)	3.4 (8.6)	16.5 (42)
Average extreme snow depth inches (cm)	3.7 (9.4)	3.2 (8.1)	1.3 (3.3)	0.0 (0.0)	0.0 (0.0)	0.0 (0.0)	0.0 (0.0)	0.0 (0.0)	0.0 (0.0)	0.0 (0.0)	0.4 (1.0)	2.1 (5.3)	6.2 (16)
Average precipitation days (≥ 0.01 in)	8.2	8.3	11.1	11.3	12.6	9.3	8.8	8.5	7.3	9.1	8.5	7.8	110.8
Average rainy days	6.8	7.8	12.4	14.0	15.0	12.1	10.4	11.3	11.4	12.1	11.0	10.2	134.5
Average snowy days (≥ 0.1 in)	3.6	2.8	1.1	0.2	0.0	0.0	0.0	0.0	0.0	0.1	0.8	2.1	10.7
Average relative humidity (%)	71.2	71.5	67.3	63.9	70.9	71.3	69.5	70.8	71.7	69.4	71.8	74.0	70.3
Average dew point °F (°C)	18.3 (−7.6)	22.8 (−5.1)	32.0 (0.0)	41.2 (5.1)	52.7 (11.5)	61.9 (16.6)	65.7 (18.7)	63.9 (17.7)	57.0 (13.9)	44.4 (6.9)	34.0 (1.1)	23.7 (−4.6)	43.1 (6.2)
Mean monthly sunshine hours	161.5	154.3	193.5	226.9	264.1	294.1	313.4	288.5	229.1	210.7	150.6	140.3	2,627
Percentage possible sunshine	53	51	52	57	60	66	69	68	61	61	50	48	59
Average ultraviolet index	2	3	5	7	8	9	10	9	7	4	3	2	6
Source 1: NOAA (rain/drizzle days, relative humidity and dew point 1969–1990, sun 1961–1990)
Source 2: Weather Atlas (UV)

== Cityscape ==
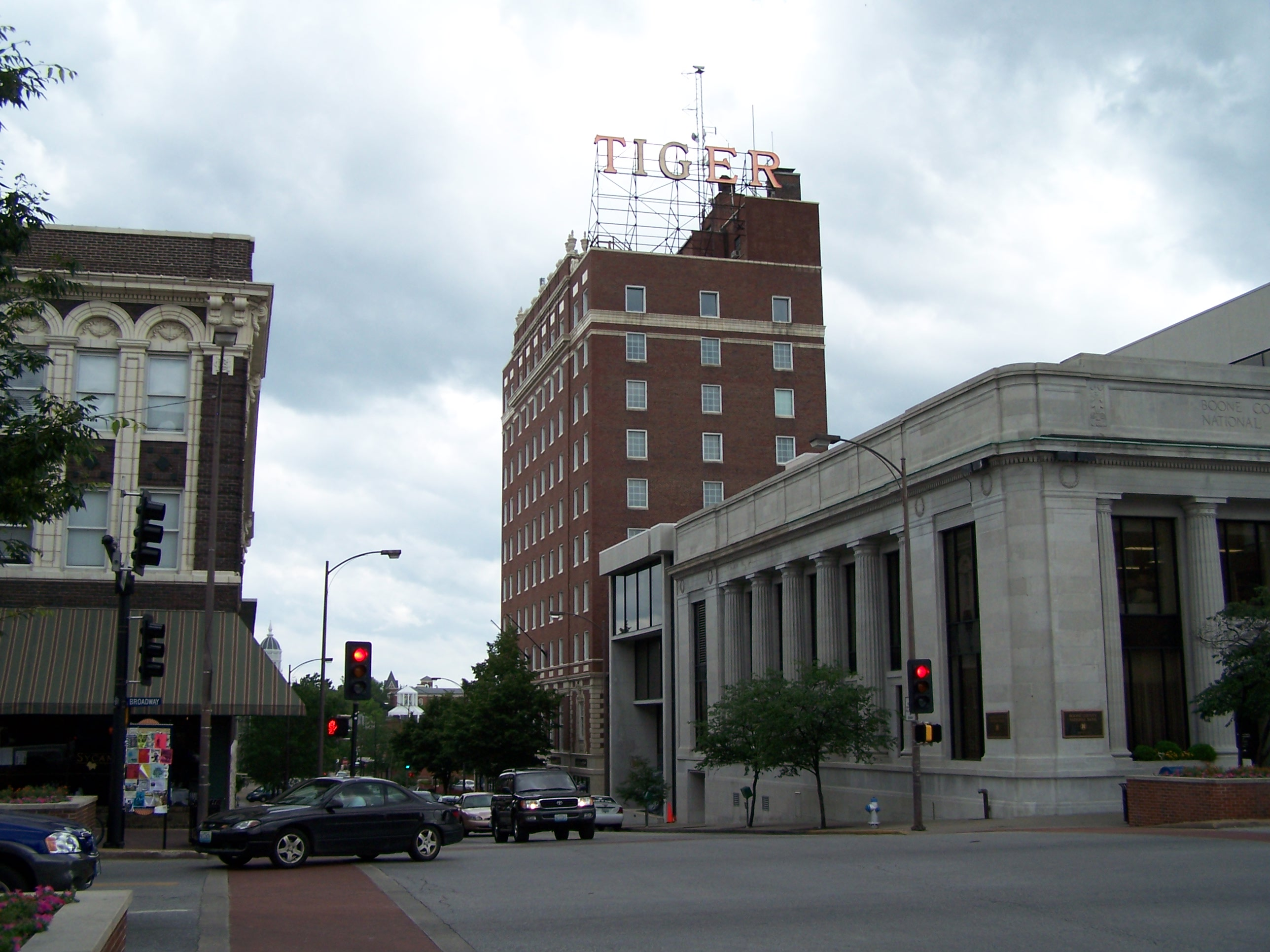
Downtown Columbia

Columbia's most significant and well-known architecture is found in buildings located in its downtown area and on the university campuses. The University of Missouri's Jesse Hall and the neo-Gothic Memorial Union have become icons of the city. The David R. Francis Quadrangle is an example of Thomas Jefferson's academic village concept.

Nine historic districts located within the city are listed on the National Register of Historic Places: Downtown Columbia, the East Campus neighborhood, the West Broadway neighborhood, the Francis Quadrangle, the south campus of Stephens College, the Pierce Pennant Motor Hotel, Maplewood, and the David Guitar House. The downtown skyline is relatively low and is dominated by the 10-story Tiger Hotel and the 15-story Paquin Tower.

Downtown Columbia is an area around one square mile surrounded by the University of Missouri on the south, Stephens College to the east, and Columbia College on the north. The area serves as Columbia's financial and business district.

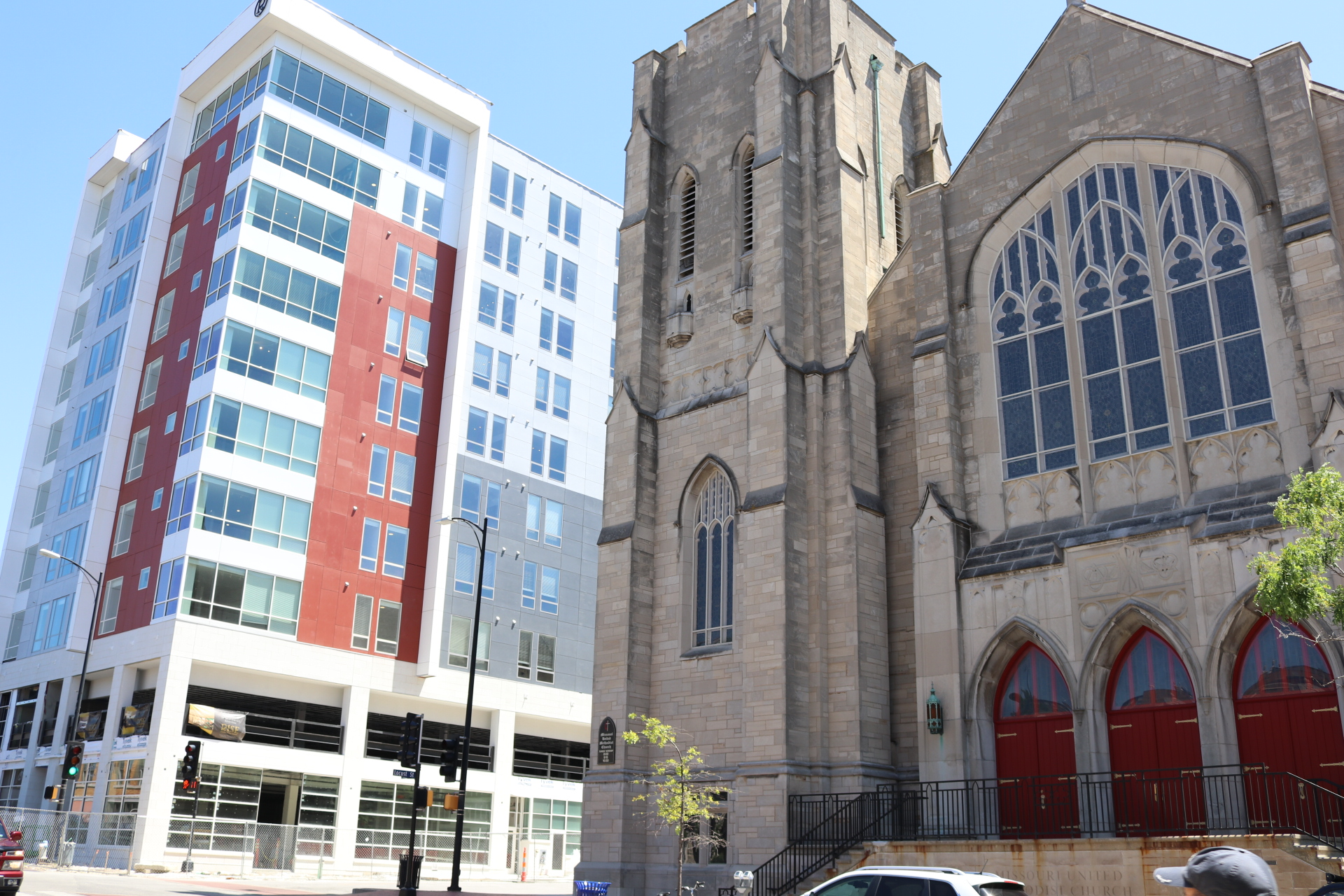
Downtown apartment and mixed-use development next to the Missouri United Methodist Church in June 2017

Since the early 21st century, a large number of high-rise apartment complexes have been built in downtown Columbia. Many of these buildings also offer mixed-use business and retail space on the lower levels. These developments have not been without criticism, with some expressing concern the buildings hurt the historic feel of the area, or that the city does not yet have the infrastructure to support them.

The city's historic residential core lies in a ring around downtown, extending especially to the west along Broadway, and south into the East Campus Neighborhood. The city government recognizes 63 neighborhood associations. The city's most dense commercial areas are primarily along Interstate 70, U.S. Route 63, Stadium Boulevard, Grindstone Parkway, and Downtown.

== Demographics ==
Historical population
Year	Pop.	±%
1823	130	—
1830	600	+361.5%
1840	750	+25.0%
1850	651	−13.2%
1860	1,414	+117.2%
1870	2,236	+58.1%
1880	3,326	+48.7%
1890	4,000	+20.3%
1900	5,651	+41.3%
1910	9,662	+71.0%
1920	10,392	+7.6%
1930	14,967	+44.0%
1940	18,399	+22.9%
1950	31,974	+73.8%
1960	36,650	+14.6%
1970	58,521	+59.7%
1980	62,061	+6.0%
1990	69,101	+11.3%
2000	84,531	+22.3%
2010	108,500	+28.4%
2020	126,254	+16.4%
2024	130,900	+3.7%
For the year 1850, slaves and free minorities were not counted. U.S. Decennial Census; Source: U.S. Decennial Census

=== 2020 census ===
The 2020 United States census counted 126,254 people, 49,371 households, and 25,144 families in Columbia. The population density was 1,879.6 inhabitants per square mile (725.7/km^{2}). The 53,746 housing units had an average density of 800.1 per square mile (308.9/km^{2}). The racial makeup (including Hispanics in the racial counts) was 72.49% (91,516) White, 11.91% (15,038) Black or African American, 0.32% (398) Native American, 5.61% (7,084) Asian, 0.07% (89) Pacific Islander, 2.17% (2,734) from other races, and 7.44% (9,395) from two or more races. Hispanic or Latino people of any race were 4.9% (6,195) of the population.

Of the 49,371 households, 24.0% had children under 18, 38.7% were married couples living together, 31.4% had a female householder with no husband present, 34.7% were individuals, and 8.6% had someone living alone who was 65 or older. The average household size was 2.3, and the average family size was 3.0.

The age distribution was 18.2% under 18, 23.8% from 18 to 24, 26.4% from 25 to 44, 18.0% from 45 to 64, and 10.7% who were 65 or older. The median age was 28.8 years. For every 100 females, the city had 93.3 males. For every 100 females 18 and older, there were 89.8 males.

The 2016–2020 five-year American Community Survey estimates show that the median household income was $53,447 (with a margin of error of +/- $2,355) and the median family income $81,392 (+/- $5,687). Males had a median income of $30,578 (+/- $2,131) versus $23,705 (+/- $1,849) for females. The median income for those above 16 was $26,870 (+/- $1,429). Apbout 8.5% of families and 20.2% of the population were below the poverty line, including 15.7% of those under 18 and 5.2% of those 65 or over.

Columbia, Missouri – racial and ethnic composition Note: the U.S. census treats Hispanic/Latino as an ethnic category. This table excludes Latinos from the racial categories and assigns them to a separate category. Hispanics/Latinos may be of any race.
Race / ethnicity (NH = Non-Hispanic)	Pop 2000	Pop 2010	Pop 2020	% 2000	% 2010	% 2020
White alone (NH)	67,984	83,542	89,814	80.42%	77.00%	71.14%
Black or African American alone (NH)	9,106	12,083	14,858	10.77%	11.14%	11.77%
Native American or Alaska Native alone (NH)	303	296	273	0.36%	0.27%	0.22%
Asian alone (NH)	3,624	5,604	7,056	4.29%	5.16%	5.59%
Pacific Islander alone (NH)	29	59	87	0.03%	0.05%	0.07%
Some other race alone (NH)	174	227	724	0.21%	0.21%	0.57%
Multiracial (NH)	1,578	2,960	7,247	1.87%	2.73%	5.74%
Hispanic or Latino (any race)	1,733	3,729	6,195	2.05%	3.44%	4.91%
Total	84,531	108,500	126,254	100.00%	100.00%	100.00%

=== 2010 census ===
As of the census of 2010, 108,500 people, 43,065 households, and 21,418 families resided in the city. The population density was 1,720.0 inhabitants per square mile (664.1/km^{2}). The 46,758 housing units had an average density of 741.2 per square mile (286.2/km^{2}). The racial makeup of the city was 79.0% White, 11.3% African American, 0.3% Native American, 5.2% Asian, 0.1% Pacific Islander, 1.1% from other races, and 3.1% from two or more races. Hispanic or Latino people of any race were 3.4% of the population.

Of the 43,065 households, 26.1% had children under18 living with them, 35.6% were married couples living together, 10.6% had a female householder with no husband present, 3.5% had a male householder with no wife present, and 50.3% were not families. About 32.0% of all households were made up of individuals, and 6.6% had someone living alone who was 65 or older. The average household size was 2.32, and the average family size was 2.94.

In the city, the age distribution was 18.8% under 18, 27.3% from 18 to 24, 26.7% from 25 to 44, 18.6% from 45 to 64, and 8.5% who were 65 or older. The median age in the city was 26.8 years. The gender makeup of the city was 48.3% male and 51.7% female.

=== 2000 census ===
As of the census of 2000, 84,531 people, 33,689 households, and 17,282 families resided in the city. The population density was 1,592.8 inhabitants per square mile (615.0/km^{2}). The 35,916 housing units had an average density of 676.8 per square mile (261.3/km^{2}). The racial makeup of the city was 81.54% White, 10.85% Black or African American, 0.39% Native American, 4.30% Asian, 0.04% Pacific Islander, 0.81% from other races, and 2.07% from two or more races. Hispanic or Latino people of any race were 2.05% of the population.

Of the 33,689 households, 26.1% had children under 18 living with them, 38.2% were married couples living together, 10.3% had a female householder with no husband present, and 48.7% were not families. Around 33.1% of all households were made up of individuals, and 6.5% had someone living alone who was 65 or older. The average household size was 2.26, and the average family size was 2.92.

In the city, the age distribution was 19.7% under 18, 26.7% from 18 to 24, 28.7% from 25 to 44, 16.2% from 45 to 64, and 8.6% who were 65 or older. The median age was 27 years. For every 100 females, there were 91.8 males. For every 100 females 18 and over, there were 89.1 males.

The median income in the city for a household was $33,729 and for a family was $52,288. Males had a median income of $34,710 versus $26,694 for females. The per capita income for the city was $19,507. About 9.4% of families and 19.2% of the population were below the poverty line, including 14.8% of those under 18 and 5.2% of those 65 or over. However, traditional statistics of income and poverty can be misleading when applied to cities with high student populations, such as Columbia.

== Economy ==
Columbia's economy is historically dominated by education, healthcare, and insurance. Jobs in government are also common, either in Columbia or a half-hour south in Jefferson City. The Columbia Regional Airport and the Missouri River Port of Rocheport connect the region with trade and transportation.

With a gross metropolitan product of $9.6 billion in 2018, Columbia's economy makes up 3% of the gross state product of Missouri. Columbia's metro area economy is slightly larger than the economy of Rwanda. Insurance corporations headquartered in Columbia include Shelter Insurance and the Columbia Insurance Group. Other organizations include StorageMart, Veterans United Home Loans, MFA Incorporated, the Missouri State High School Activities Association, and MFA Oil. Companies such as Socket, Datastorm Technologies, Inc. (no longer existent), Slackers CDs and Games, Carfax, and MBS Textbook Exchange were all founded in Columbia.

=== Top employers ===
According to Columbia's 2022 Annual Comprehensive Financial Report, the top employers in the city are:

Number	Employer	Number of employees	Percentage of total city employment
1	University of Missouri	8,709	9.07%
2	University of Missouri Health Care	5,092	5.30%
3	Veterans United Home Loans	3,474	3.62%
4	Columbia Public Schools	2,650	2.76%
5	Harry S. Truman Memorial Veterans' Hospital	1,779	1.85%
6	Boone Hospital Center	1,581	1.65%
7	City of Columbia	1,515	1.58%
8	Shelter Insurance	1,375	1.43%
9	Hubbell Power Systems	751	0.78%
10	Joe Machens Dealerships	611	0.64%

The unemployment rate in Columbia has slowly risen since December 2022, to 3.5% as of February 2025.

== Culture ==
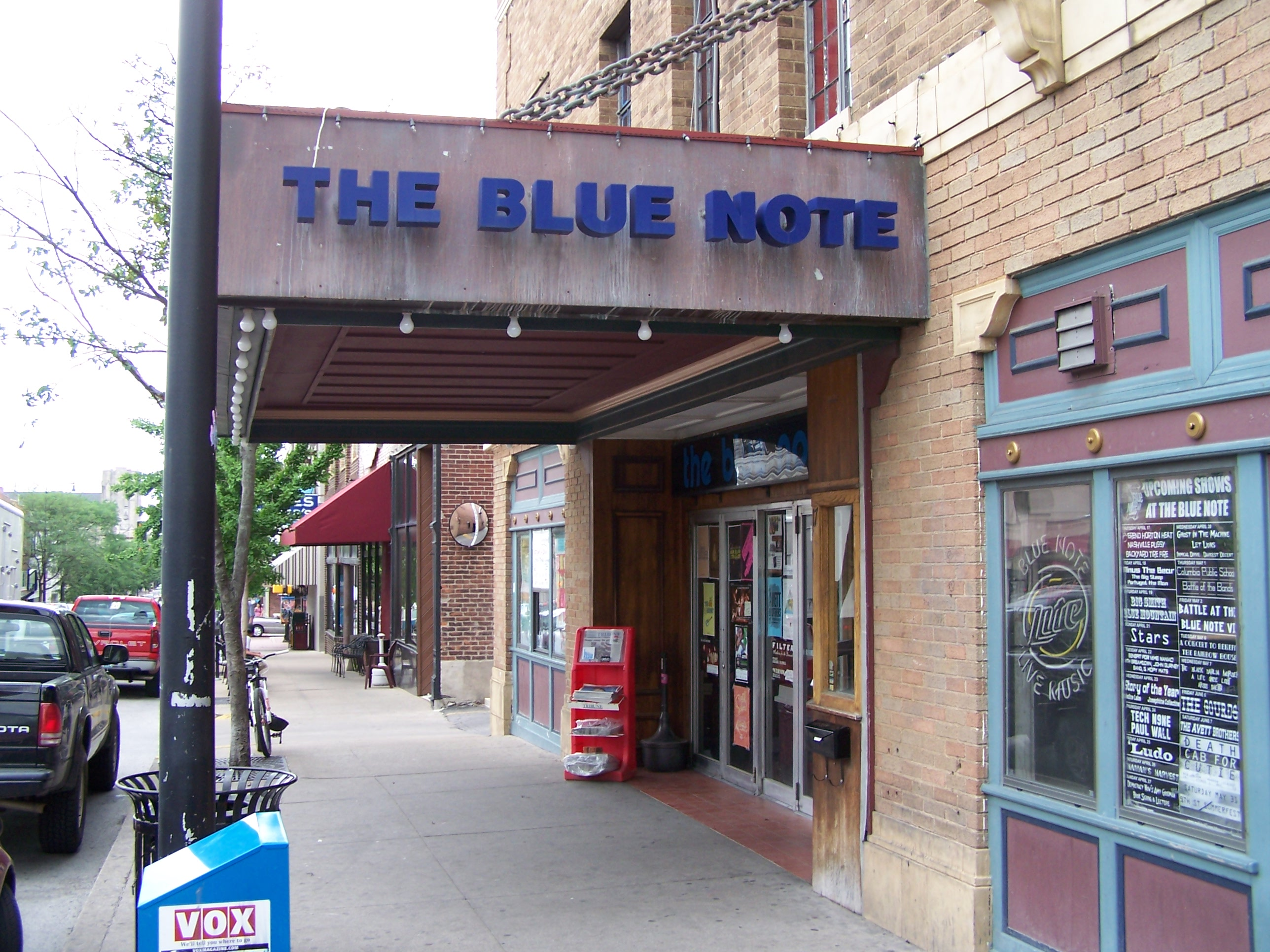
The Blue Note is a rock and pop venue located in downtown Columbia.

The Missouri Theatre Center for the Arts and Jesse Hall auditorium are Columbia's largest fine arts venues. Ragtag Cinema annually hosts the True/False Film Festival.

In 2008, filmmaker Todd Sklar completed the film Box Elder, which was filmed entirely in and around Columbia and the University of Missouri.

The North Village Arts District, located on the north side of downtown, is home to galleries, restaurants, theaters, bars, music venues, and the Mareck Center for Dance.

The University of Missouri's Museum of Art and Archaeology displays 14,000 works of art and archaeological objects in five galleries at no charge to the public.

Libraries include the Columbia Public Library, the University of Missouri Libraries, with over three million volumes in Ellis Library, and the State Historical Society of Missouri.

=== Music ===
The "We Always Swing" Jazz Series and the Roots N Blues Festival is held in Columbia. "9th Street Summerfest" (now hosted in Rose Park at Rose Music Hall) closes part of that street several nights each summer to hold outdoor performances and has featured Willie Nelson (2009), Snoop Dogg (2010), The Flaming Lips (2010), Weird Al Yankovic (2013), and others. The "University Concert Series" regularly includes musicians and dancers from various genres, typically in Jesse Hall. Other musical venues in town include the Missouri Theatre, the university's multipurpose Hearnes Center, the university's Mizzou Arena, The Blue Note, and Rose Music Hall. Shelter Gardens, a park on the campus of Shelter Insurance headquarters, also hosts outdoor performances during the summer.

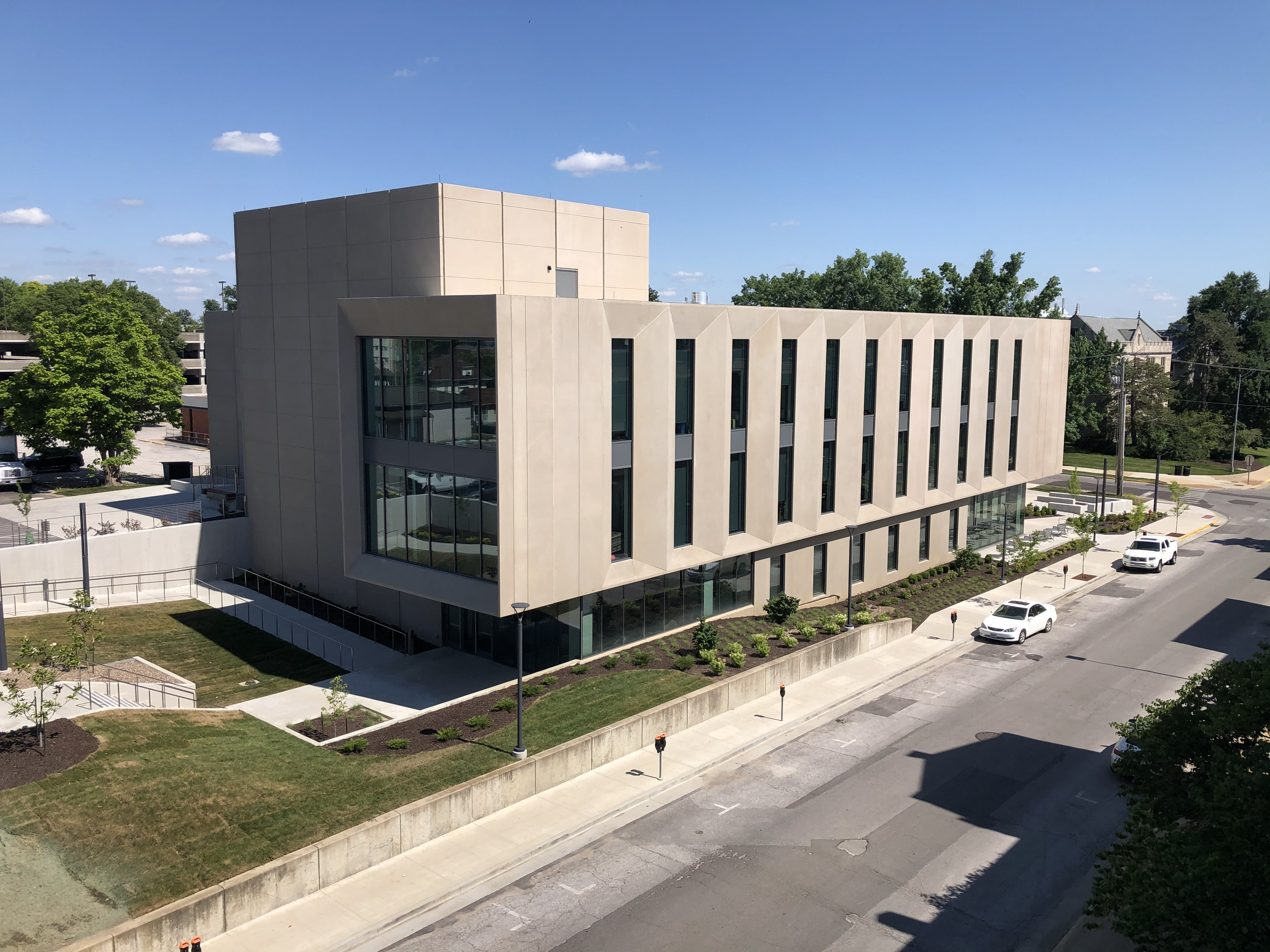
The Sinquefield Music Center, home to the University of Missouri School of Music

The University of Missouri School of Music attracts hundreds of musicians to Columbia, student performances are held in Whitmore Recital Hall. Among many non-profit organizations for classical music are included the "Odyssey Chamber Music Series", "Missouri Symphony", "Columbia Community Band", and "Columbia Civic Orchestra". Founded in 2006, the "Plowman Chamber Music Competition" is a biennial competition held in March/April of odd-numbered years, considered to be one of the finest, top five chamber music competitions in the nation.

The McKinney Building, located at 411 E. Broadway, is a historic African-American cultural landmark built in 1917 by black day laborer Frank McKinney. Its second-floor dance hall, McKinney Hall, served as a prominent jazz venue during the 1920s and 1930s, hosting performances by Count Basie, Louis Armstrong, Ella Fitzgerald, Billie Holiday, and Dizzy Gillespie. The building also functioned as a community center and was one of the few venues in Columbia with public restrooms accessible to Black residents during segregation. Located near the historic Sharp End district, the building is part of Columbia's African American Heritage Trail. The City of Columbia purchased the building in 2023 with plans to restore it as a cultural landmark.

=== Theater ===
Columbia has multiple opportunities to watch and perform in theatrical productions. The city is home to Stephens College, a private institution known for performing arts. Their season includes multiple plays and musicals. The University of Missouri and Columbia College also present multiple productions a year.

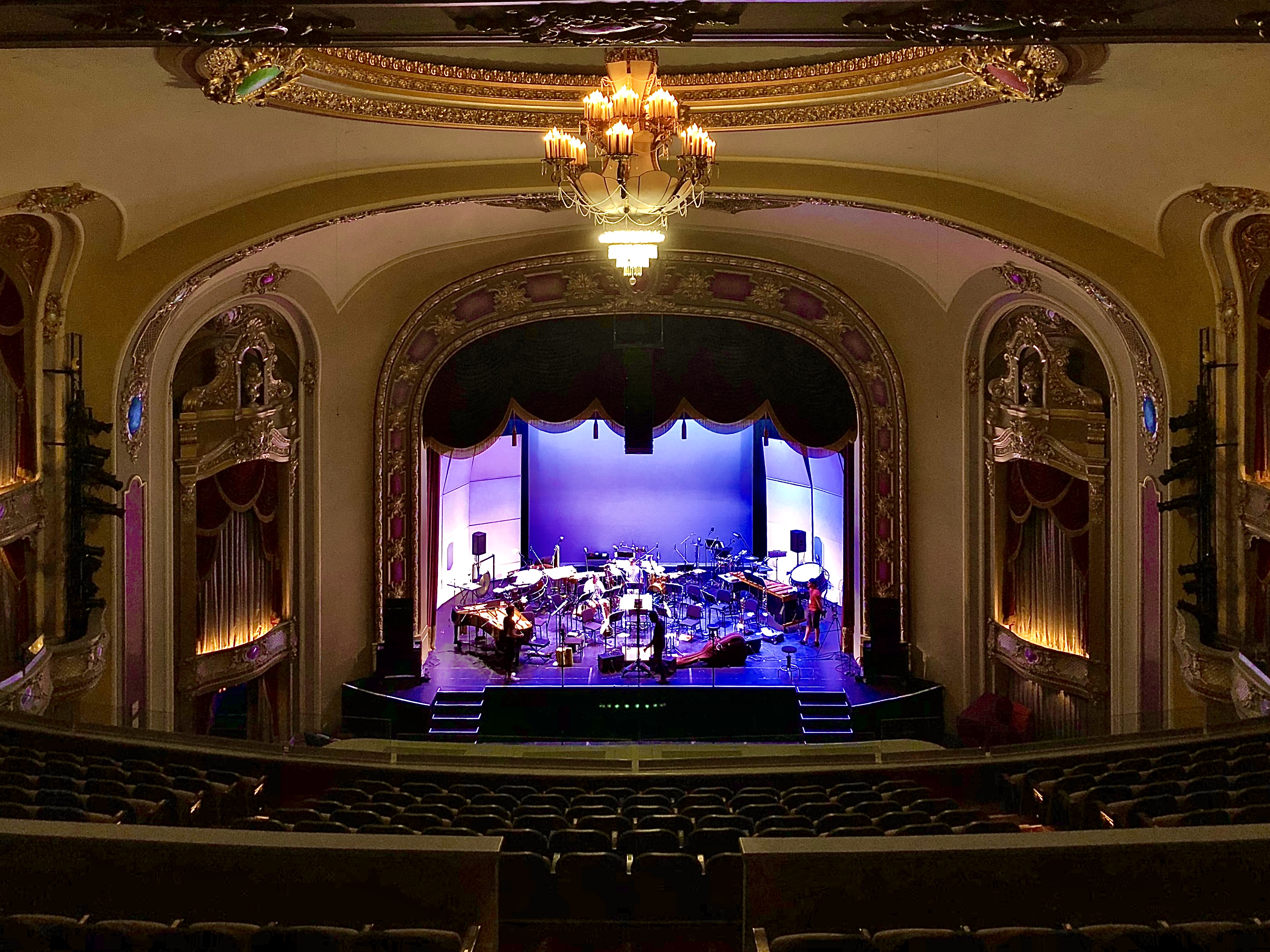
The Missouri Theater

The city's three public high schools are also known for their productions. Rock Bridge High School performs a musical in November and two plays in the spring. Hickman High School also performs a similar season with two musical performances (one in the fall, and one in the spring) and 2 plays (one in the winter, and one at the end of their school year). The newest high school, Battle High, opened in 2013 and also is known for their productions. Battle presents a musical in the fall and a play in the spring, along with improv nights and more productions throughout the year.

The city is also home to the indoor/outdoor theatre Maplewood Barn Theatre in Nifong Park and other community theatre programs such as Columbia Entertainment Company, Talking Horse Productions, TRYPS, and Pace Youth Theatre; the latter closed in March 2020.

=== Sports ===
Faurot Field before a football game

The University of Missouri's sports teams, the Missouri Tigers, play a significant role in the city's sports culture. Faurot Field at Memorial Stadium, which has a capacity of 62,621, hosts home football games. The Hearnes Center and Mizzou Arena are two other large sport and event venues, the latter being the home arena for Mizzou's basketball team. Taylor Stadium is host to their baseball team and was the regional host for the 2007 NCAA Baseball Championship. Columbia College has several men and women collegiate sports teams as well. In 2007, Columbia hosted the National Association of Intercollegiate Athletics Volleyball National Championship, which the Lady Cougars participated in.

Columbia also hosts the Show-Me State Games, a non-profit program of the Missouri Governor's Council on Physical Fitness and Health. They are the largest state games in the United States.

Situated midway between St. Louis and Kansas City, Columbians will often have allegiances to the professional sports teams housed there, such as the St. Louis Cardinals, the Kansas City Royals, the Kansas City Chiefs, the St. Louis Blues, Sporting Kansas City, and St. Louis City SC.

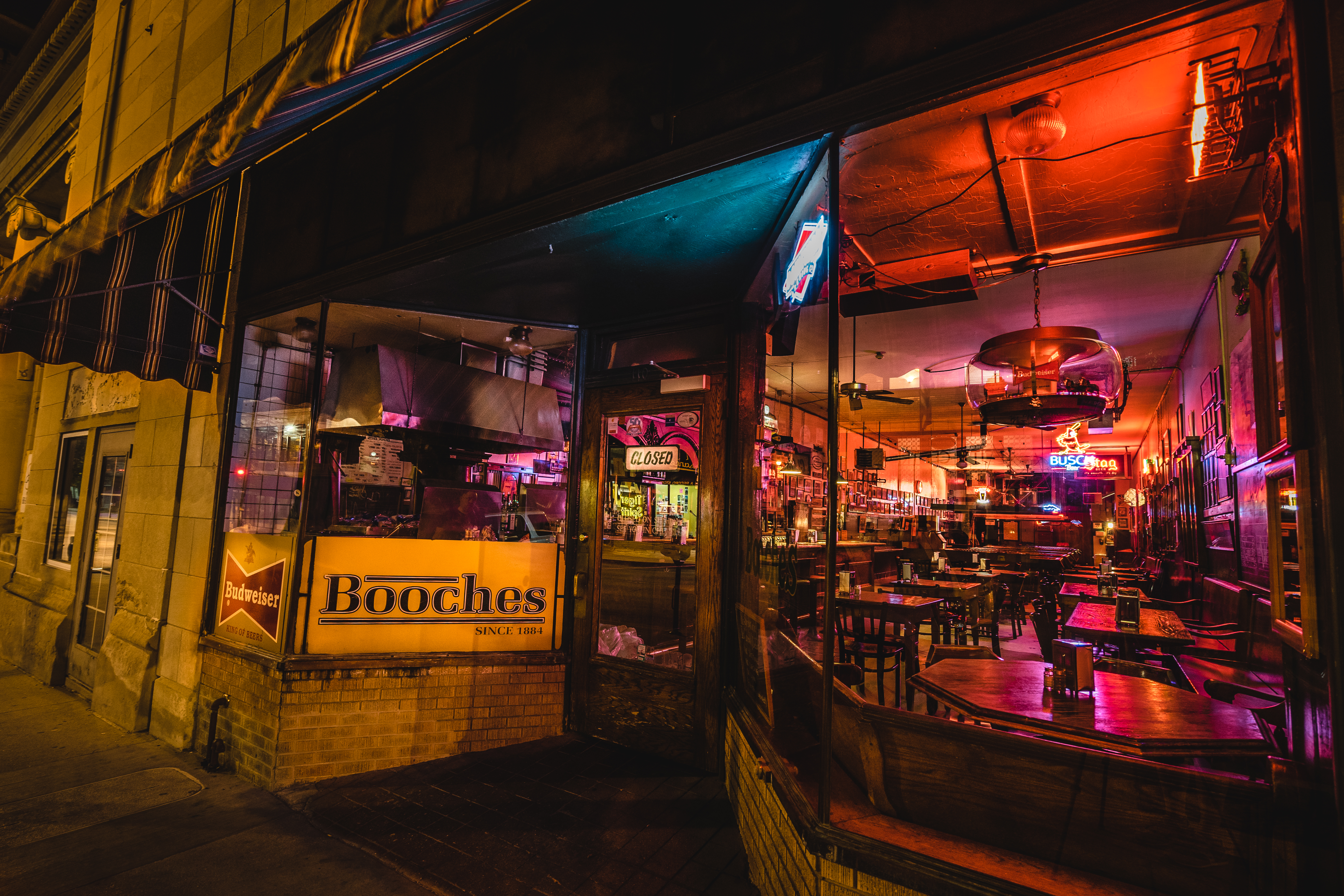
Booches bar and grill

=== Cuisine ===
Columbia has many bars and restaurants that provide diverse styles of cuisine, due in part to having three colleges. The oldest is the historic Booches bar, restaurant, and pool hall, which was established in 1884 and is frequented by college students. Shakespeare's Pizza was founded in Columbia and is known for its college town pizza.

== Parks and recreation ==
Throughout the city are many parks and trails for public usage managed by Columbia Parks and Recreation. Among the more popularly frequented is the MKT which is a spur that connects to the Katy Trail, meeting up just south of Columbia proper. The MKT ranked second in the nation for "Best Urban Trail" in the 2015 USA Today's 10 Best Readers' Choice Awards. This 10-foot wide trail built on the old railbed of the MKT railroad begins in downtown Columbia in Flat Branch Park at 4th and Cherry Streets. The all-weather crushed limestone surface provides opportunities for walking, jogging, running, and bicycling.

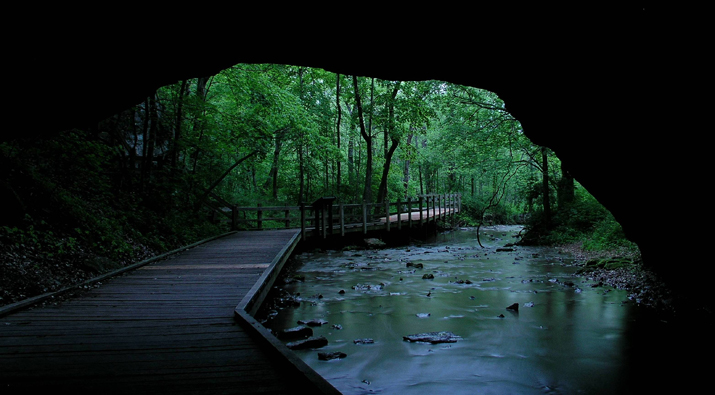
The iconic rock bridge of Rock Bridge Memorial State Park

Stephens Lake Park is the highlight of Columbia's park system and is known for its 11-acre fishing/swimming lake, mature trees, and historical significance in the community. It serves as the center for outdoor winter sports, a variety of community festivals such as the Roots N Blues Festival, and outdoor concert series at the amphitheater. Stephens Lake has reservable shelters, playgrounds, swimming beach and spraygrounds, art sculptures, waterfalls, and walking trails. Rock Bridge Memorial State Park is open year-round giving visitors the chance to scramble, hike, and bicycle through a scenic environment. Rock Bridge State Park contains some of the most popular hiking trails in the state, including the Gans Creek Wild Area.

Columbia is home to Harmony Bends Disc Golf Course, which was named the 2017 Disc Golf Course of the Year by DGCourseReview.com. As of June 2022, Harmony Bends still ranks on DGCourseReview.com as the No. 1 public course, and the #2 overall course in the United States

== Media ==
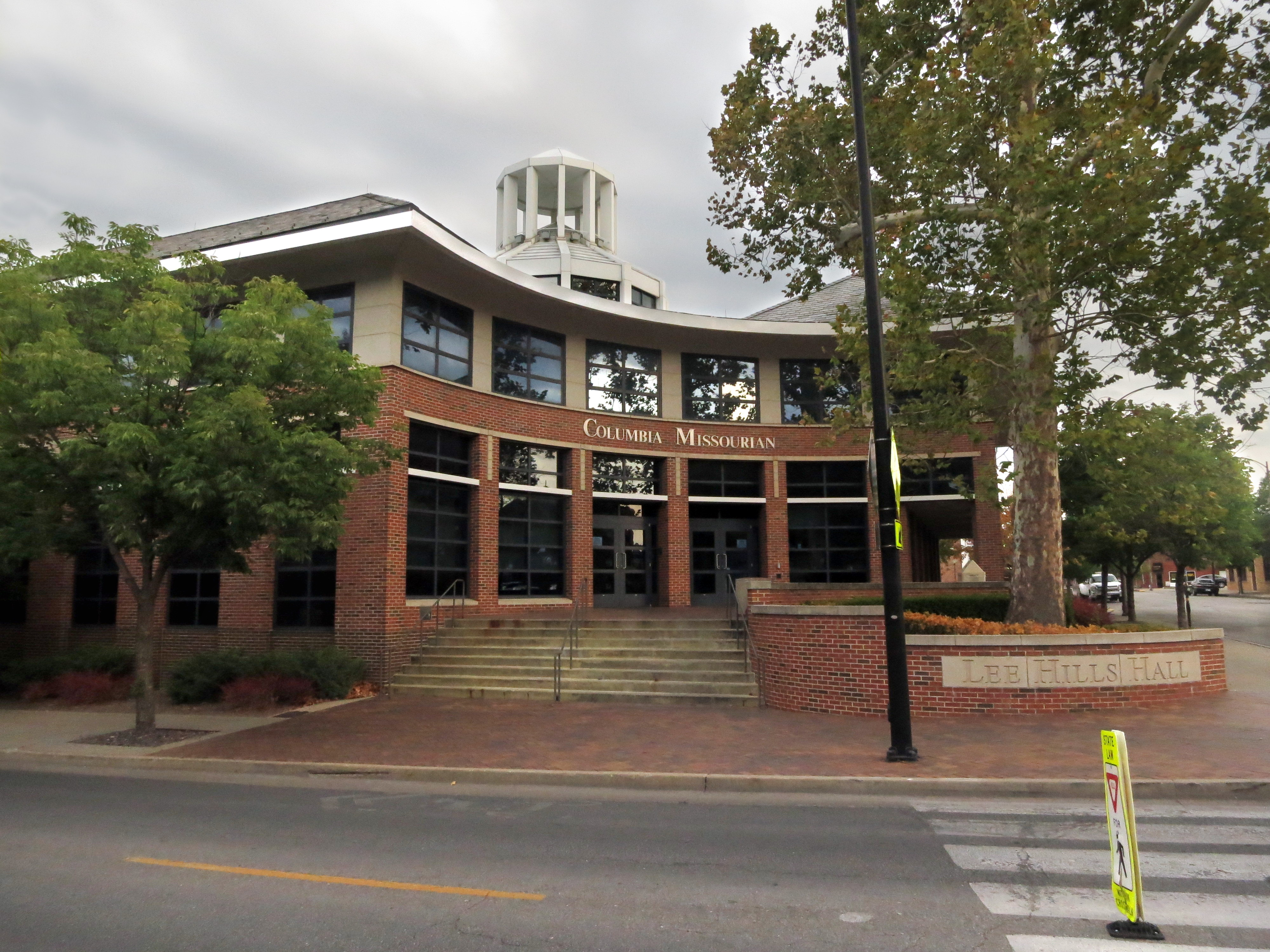
The Columbia Missourian headquarters

The city has two daily morning newspapers: the Columbia Missourian and the Columbia Daily Tribune. The Missourian is directed by professional editors and staffed by Missouri School of Journalism students who do reporting, design, copy editing, information graphics, photography, and multimedia. The Missourian publishes the monthly city magazine, Vox Magazine. The University of Missouri has the independent official bi-weekly student newspaper called The Maneater, and the quarterly literary magazine, The Missouri Review. The now-defunct Prysms Weekly was also published in Columbia. In late 2009, KCOU News launched full operations out of KCOU 88.1 FM on the MU Campus. The entirely student-run news organization airs a weekday newscast, The Pulse.

The city has four television channels. Columbia Access Television (CAT or CAT-TV) is the public access channel. CPSTV is the education access channel, managed by Columbia Public Schools as a function of the Columbia Public Schools Community Relations Department. The Government Access channel broadcasts City Council, Planning and Zoning Commission, and Board of Adjustment meetings.

=== Television ===
Columbia area television
Station	Channel	Network	Subchannels
KMOS-TV	6	PBS	6.2 Create 6.3 KMOS Emerge 6.4 PBS Kids
KOMU-TV	8	NBC	8.3 The CW+
KRCG	13	CBS	13.2 Comet 13.3 Charge! 13.4 TBD
KMIZ	17	ABC	17.2 MeTV 17.3 MyNetworkTV 17.4 Fox 17.5 Bounce TV
KQFX-LD	22	Fox	22.2 Laff 22.3 Grit 22.4 Court TV Mystery 22.5 Dabl
KFDR	25	CTN	25.2 CTNi 25.3 CTN (SD) 25.4 CTN Lifestyle
K35OY-D	35	Azteca America	35.2 Infomercials 35.3 Infomercials 35.4 Infomercials
KGKM-LD	36	Telemundo	36.2 Ion Television 36.3 Court TV 36.4 Defy TV 36.5 TrueReal 36.6 Newsy

=== Radio ===
Columbia has 19 radio stations as well as stations licensed from Jefferson City, Macon, and Lake of the Ozarks.

==== AM ====
- KFAL 900 kHz • Country
- KWOS 950 kHz • News/Talk
- KFRU 1400 kHz • News/Talk
- KTGR 1580 kHz • Sports (ESPN Radio)

==== FM ====
- KCOU 88.1 MHz • College
- KOPN 89.5 MHz • Public
- KMUC 90.5 MHz • Classical
- KBIA 91.3 MHz • News (NPR)
- KMFC 92.1 MHz • Christian (K-Love)
- KWJK 93.1 MHz • Variety (JACK FM)
- KSSZ 93.9 MHz • News/Talk
- KWWR 95.7 MHz • Country
- KCMQ 96.7 MHz • Classic Rock
- KDVC 98.3 MHz • Classic Hits
- KCLR 99.3 MHz • Country
- KPLA 101.5 MHz • Variety
- KBXR 102.3 MHz • Alternative
- KZZT 105.5 MHz • Classic Rock
- KOQL 106.1 MHz • Top 40
- KTXY 106.9 MHz Top 40

== Government and politics ==
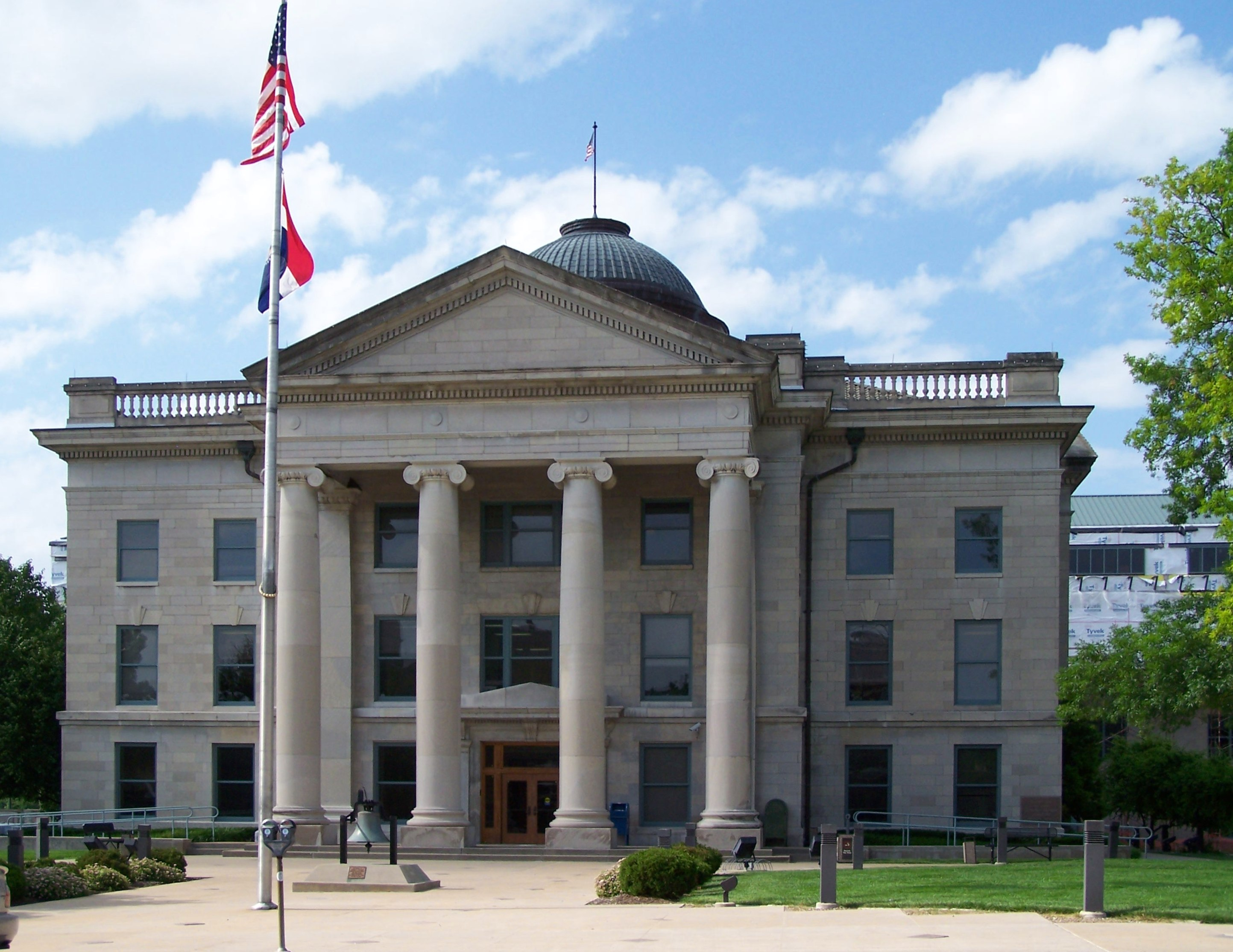
The Boone County Courthouse within the Boone County Government Center

Columbia's current government was established by a home rule charter adopted by voters on November 11, 1974, which established a council-manager government that invested power in the city council. The city council has seven members: six elected by each of Columbia's six single-member districts or wards and an at-large member, the mayor, who is elected by all city voters. The mayor receives a $9,000 annual stipend, and the six other members receive a $6,000 annual stipend. They are elected to staggered three-year terms. As well as serving as a voting member of the city council, the mayor is recognized as the head of city government for ceremonial purposes. Chief executive authority is invested in a hired city manager, who oversees the government's day-to-day operations.

Columbia is the county seat of Boone County, and houses the county court and government center. The city is in Missouri's 4th congressional district. The 19th Missouri State Senate district covers all of Boone County. There are five Missouri House of Representatives districts (9, 21, 23, 24, and 25) in the city. The Columbia Police Department provides law enforcement across the city, while the Columbia Fire Department provides fire protection. The University of Missouri Police Department also patrols areas on and around the University of Missouri campus and has jurisdiction throughout the state. Additionally, the Boone County Sheriff's Department, the law enforcement agency for the county, regularly patrols the city. The Public Service Joint Communications Center coordinates efforts between the two organizations as well as the Boone County Fire Protection District, which operates Urban Search and Rescue Missouri Task Force 1.

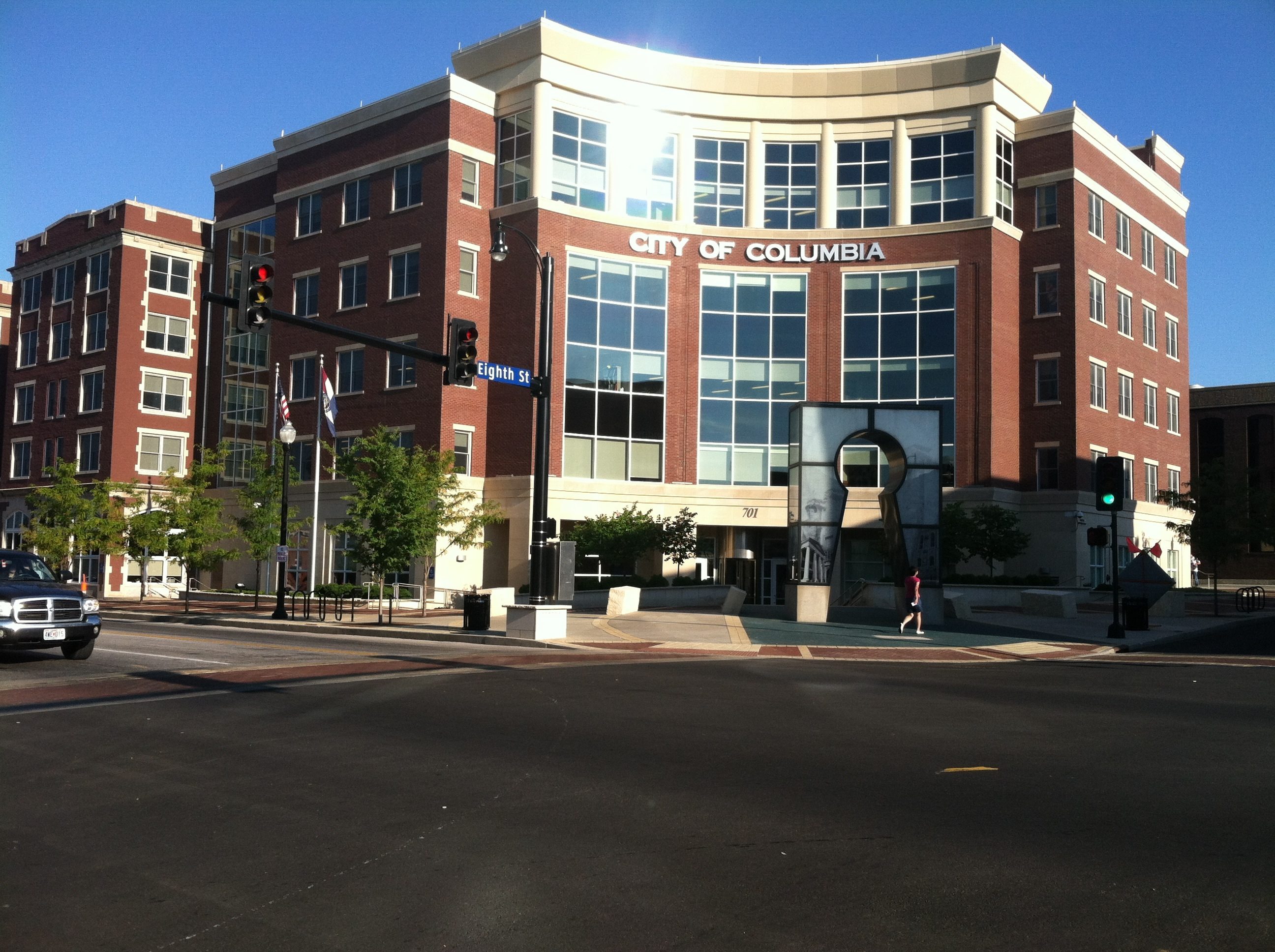
The Daniel Boone Building houses Columbia's City Hall.

The population generally supports progressive causes, such as recycling programs and the decriminalization of cannabis both for medical and recreational use at the municipal level, though the scope of the latter of the two cannabis ordinances has since been restricted. The city is one of only four in the state to offer medical benefits to same-sex partners of city employees. The new health plan extends health benefits to unmarried heterosexual domestic partners of city employees.

On October 10, 2006, the city council approved an ordinance to prohibit smoking in public places, including restaurants and bars. The ordinance was passed over protest, and several amendments to the ordinance reflect this. Over half of residents possess at least a bachelor's degree, while over a quarter hold a graduate degree. Columbia is the 13th most-highly educated municipality in the United States.

In February 2024, the Columbia City Council voted to legally make and declare the entire city a safe haven for transgender people and cisgender homosexuals.

== Education ==
Almost all of the Columbia city limits, and much of the surrounding area, lie within the Columbia Public School District. The district enrolled more than 18,000 students and had a budget of $281 million for the 2019–20 school year.

95.4% of adults age 25 and older in the city have a high school diploma. In 2022, Columbia Public Schools recorded a 67.7% attendance rate, lower than the state average of 76.2%. Last year's graduation rate for the class of 2022 was 90%, while the class of 2021's graduation rate was reported at 89%. According to statewide numbers for 2022, Missouri's overall graduation rate was 91.16%. The Columbia school district operates four public high schools which cover grades 9–12: David H. Hickman High School, Rock Bridge High School, Muriel Battle High School, and Frederick Douglass High School. Rock Bridge is one of two Missouri high schools to receive a silver medal by U.S. News & World Report, putting it in the Top 3% of all high schools in the nation. Hickman has been on Newsweek magazine's list of Top 1,300 schools in the country for the past three years and has more named presidential scholars than any other public high school in the US. There are also several private high schools located in the city, including Christian Fellowship School, Columbia Independent School, Heritage Academy, Christian Chapel Academy, and Tolton High School.

CPS also manages seven middle schools: Jefferson, West, Oakland, Gentry, Smithton, Lange, and John Warner. John Warner Middle School first opened for the 2020/21 school year.

A very small portion of the city limits is in Hallsville R-IV School District. The sole high school of that district is Hallsville High School.

The United States census estimated that 55.3% of adults ages 25 and up in Columbia hold a bachelor's degree or higher. While only 31.2% of Missourians hold a bachelor's degree.

The city has three institutions of higher education: the University of Missouri, Stephens College, and Columbia College, all of which surround Downtown Columbia. The city is the headquarters of the University of Missouri System, which operates campuses in St. Louis, Kansas City, and Rolla. Moberly Area Community College, Central Methodist University, and William Woods University, as well as satellite campuses in Columbia.

== Infrastructure ==
=== Transportation ===
The Columbia Transit provides public bus and para-transit service, and is owned and operated by the city. In 2008, 1,414,400 passengers boarded along the system's six fixed routes and nine University of Missouri shuttle routes, and 27,000 boarded the Para-transit service. The system is constantly experiencing growth in service and technology. A $3.5 million project to renovate and expand the Wabash Station, a rail depot built in 1910 and converted into the city's transit center in the mid-1980s, was completed in summer of 2007. In 2007, a Transit Master Plan was created to address the future transit needs of the city and county with a comprehensive plan to add infrastructure in three key phases. The five to 15-year plan intends to add service along the southwest, southeast and northeast sections of Columbia and develop alternative transportation models for Boone County.

The city is served by Columbia Regional Airport. The closest rail station is Jefferson City station, in the state capital Jefferson City.

Columbia is also known for its MKT Trail, a spur of the Katy Trail State Park, which allows foot and bike traffic across the city, and, conceivably, the state. It consists of a soft gravel surface for running and biking. Columbia also is preparing to embark on construction of several new bike paths and street bike lanes thanks to a $25 million grant from the federal government. The city is also served by United Airlines and American Airlines at the Columbia Regional Airport, the only commercial airport in mid-Missouri.

I-70 (concurrent with US 40) and US 63 are the two main freeways used for travel to and from Columbia. Within the city, there are also three state highways: Routes 763 (Rangeline Street & College Avenue), 163 (Providence Road), and 740 (Stadium Boulevard).

Rail service is provided by the city-owned Columbia Terminal Railroad (COLT), which runs from the north side of Columbia to Centralia and a connection to the Norfolk Southern Railway.

=== Health systems ===
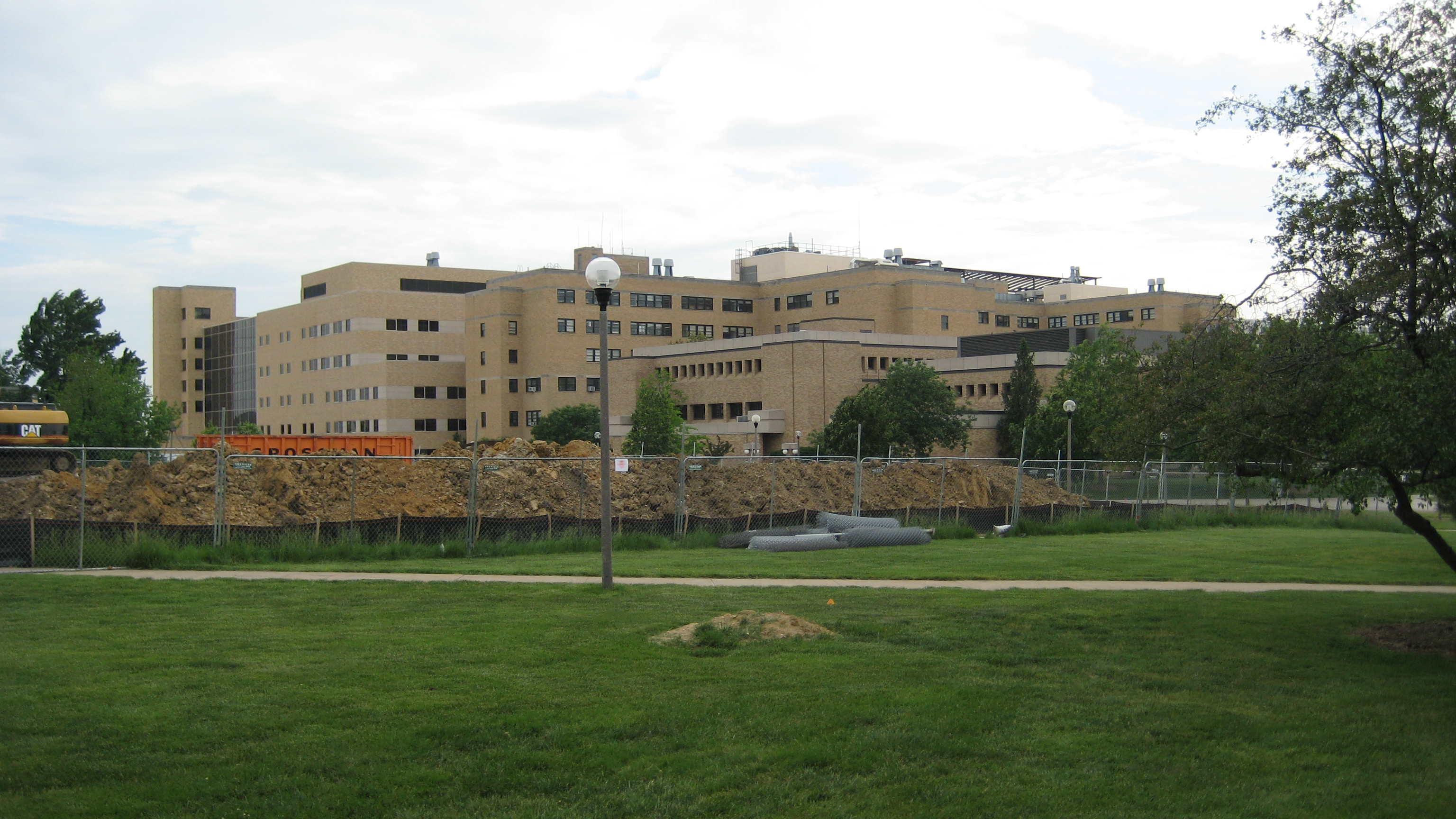
The University of Missouri Hospital is the main hospital of the MU Health Care System, and the largest hospital in Columbia.

Health care is a big part of Columbia's economy, with nearly one in six people working in a health-care related profession and a physician density that is about three times the United States average. The city's hospitals and supporting facilities are a large referral center for the state, and medical related trips to the city are common. There are three hospital systems within the city and five hospitals with a total of 1,105 beds.

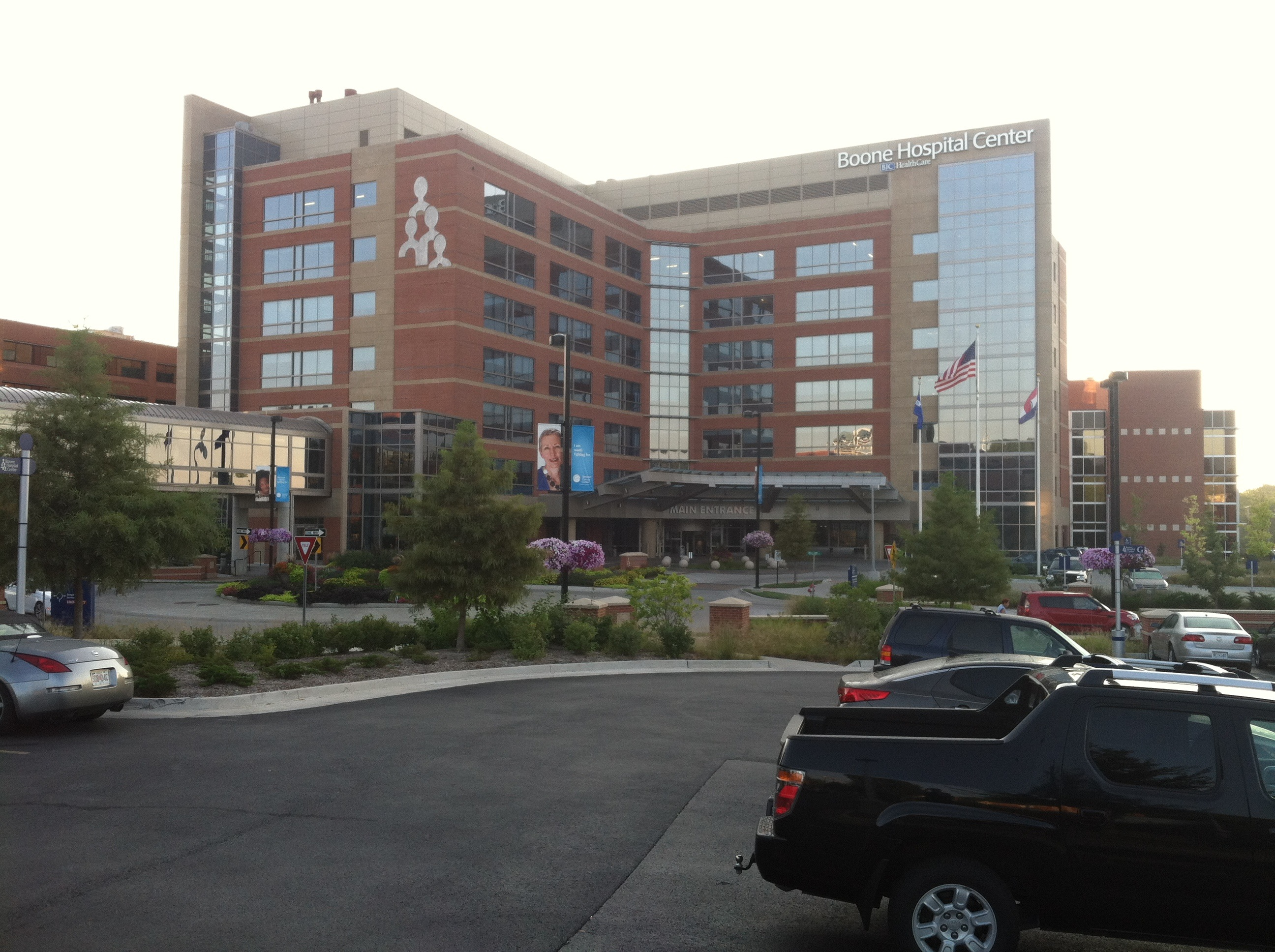
Boone Hospital Center is the second largest hospital in Columbia, and the largest private hospital in Boone County.

The University of Missouri Health Care operates three hospitals in Columbia: the University of Missouri Hospital, the University of Missouri Women's and Children's Hospital (formerly Columbia Regional Hospital), and the Ellis Fischel Cancer Center. Boone Hospital Center was administered by BJC Healthcare, but separated in 2021. The Harry S. Truman Memorial Veterans' Hospital, adjacent to University Hospital, is administered by the United States Department of Veterans Affairs.

There are a large number of medical-related industries in Columbia. The University of Missouri School of Medicine uses university-owned facilities as teaching hospitals. The University of Missouri Research Reactor Center is the largest research reactor in the United States and produces radioisotopes used in nuclear medicine. The center serves as the sole supplier of the active ingredients in two U.S. Food and Drug Administration-approved radiopharmaceuticals and produces Fluorine-18 used in PET imaging with its cyclotron.

== Sister cities ==
In accordance with the Columbia Sister Cities Program, which operates in conjunction with Sister Cities International, Columbia has been paired with five international sister cities in an attempt to foster cross-cultural understanding:

- Kutaisi, Georgia
- Hakusan, Ishikawa, Japan
- Sibiu, Romania
- Suncheon, South Jeolla, South Korea
- Laoshan, Shandong, China
- Armenia, Quindío, Colombia

== See also ==
- List of cities in Missouri
- List of people from Columbia, Missouri
- History of the University of Missouri
- National Register of Historic Places listings in Boone County, Missouri
- USS Columbia (SSN-771)
- The Big Tree

== Bibliography ==
- Stephens, E. W. (1875) "History of Boone County." An Illustrated Historical Atlas of Boone County, Missouri. Philadelphia: Edwards Brothers
- Switzler, William F. (1882). History of Boone County. St. Louis, Missouri: Western Historical Company. OCLC 2881554.
- Gentry, North Todd (1916). The Bench and Bar of Boone County: Including the History of Judges, Lawyers, and Courts, and an Account of Noted Cases, Slavery Litigation, Lawyers in War Times, Public Addresses, Political Notes, Etc. E.W. Stephens Publishing Company. OCLC 205808.
- Havig, Alan R. (1984). From southern village to Midwestern city : an illustrated history of Columbia. Woodland Hills, California: Windsor Publications. ISBN 9780897811385.
- Crighton, John C. (1987). A History of Columbia and Boone County. Columbia, Missouri: Computer Color-Graphics. OCLC 16960014.
- Sapp, David (2000) "Boone County Chronicles" Columbia: Boone County Historical Society
- Brownlee, Richard S. 1956 The Big Moniteau Bluff Pictographs in Boone County, MO. Missouri Archaeologist 18(4): 49–54
- Paten, Marty (2012). The Columbia Branch Railroad: A Chronological History of the Short Line Railroad from Centralia, Missouri to Columbia, Missouri. Columbia, Missouri: HAGR Publishing. ISBN 978-0-615-52810-6.
- Daniels, Francis Potter (1907). The Flora of Columbia, Missouri and Vicinity: An Ecological and Systematic Study of a Local Flora. Columbia, Missouri: University of Missouri. OCLC 69404603.
- Hunt, Doug (2010). The Lynching of James Scott and the Trial of George Barkwell. The author. ISBN 9781453611852.
- Hunt, Doug (2010). Black and White Justice in Little Dixie. CreateSpace Independent Publishing Platform. ISBN 9781460911037.
- Batterson, Jack A. (1998). Blind Boone, Missouri's Ragtime Pioneer. Columbia, Missouri: University of Missouri Press. ISBN 0826211984.
- Stephens, Frank F. (1965). History of the Missouri Methodist Church. Columbia, Missouri: Missouri United Methodist Church. OCLC 1144689380.
- Dains, Mary K. (1996). Guided by the Hand of God: The History of First Christian Church Columbia, Missouri 1832-1996. Columbia, Missouri: First Christian Church.
- Batterson, Paulina A. (2001). Columbia College: 150 Years of Courage, Commitment, and Change. Columbia, Missouri: University of Missouri Press. ISBN 9780826213242.
- Hale, Allean Lemmon (1956). Petticoat Pioneer: The Christian College Story 1851-1951. Columbia, Missouri: Artcraft Press.
- Crighton, John Clarke (1970). Stephens: A Story of Educational Innovation. Columbia, Missouri: American Press.
- Stephens, Frank Fletcher (1962). A History of the University of Missouri. Columbia, Missouri: University of Missouri Press. ISBN 9781258386566.
- Olsen, James and Vera (1988). The University of Missouri An Illustrated History. Columbia, Missouri: University of Missouri Press. ISBN 9780826206787.
- Viles, Jonas The University of Missouri, 1839–1939, E.W. Stephens Publishing Company
- Budds, Michael (2018). 100 Years of Music-Making at Mizzou. Columbia, Missouri: University of Missouri School of Music. ISBN 9780692987322.
- Ellis, Elmer (1989). My Road to Emeritus. Columbia, Missouri: State Historical Society of Missouri. ISBN 0962289116.
- Quarles, James Thomas (1924). University of Missouri Songs (1 ed.). Columbia, Missouri: Curators of the University of Missouri. OCLC 19229550.
