= David Guitar House =

Historic house in Missouri, United States

- U.S. National Register of Historic Places
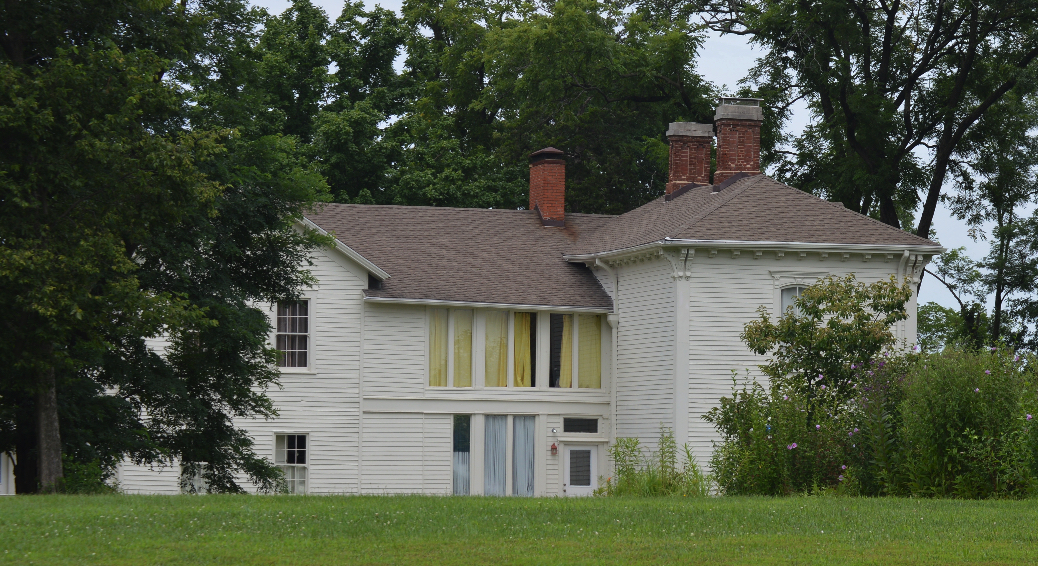

- Location within Missouri Location within the United States
- Location: 2815 Oakland Gravel Rd., Columbia, Missouri
- Coordinates: 38°58′47″N 92°18′16″W
- Area: 27 acres (11 ha)
- Built: 1859-1862
- Architectural style: Italianate
- NRHP reference No.: 93000939
- Added to NRHP: September 9, 1993

The Guitar House, previously known as Confederate Hill, is a historic home located in Columbia, Missouri. It was built between 1859 and 1862 and is a two-story, Italianate style dwelling. It has a low-pitched hipped roof, tall slender windows with segmented arches, decorative eave brackets, and a single-story front porch with square supports. The house was constructed by David Guitar, an officer in the Union forces (the 61st Regiment of the Enrolled Missouri Militia) during the American Civil War. The house was added to the National Register of Historic Places in 1993.

== Property name ==
It is commonly thought David Guitar served in the Confederate forces, but this is a myth perhaps started by a previous owner of the house, Ward Dorrance, who renamed the property Confederate Hill while he owned it from 1940 to 1953. Dorrance was a fiction writer and teacher. He left his papers to the University of North Carolina at Chapel Hill.

Other documentation of Guitar's Union service includes the front-page obituary published on Jan. 2, 1912, in the University Missourian. The National Register of Historic Places document cites the correct source and page but concludes incorrectly that the Enrolled Missouri Militia is a Confederate force. Further, Switizler's History of Boone County contains no records of Confederate service records, because "There are no official records accessible of the Confederate soldiers, and but few of the Federals."
