= Socket (telecommunications) =

Socket Telecom LLC
- Company type: Internet and Phone Provider
- Industry: Telecommunications
- Founder: John Dupuy & George Pfenenger
- Headquarters: 2703 Clark Ln, Columbia, MO, 65202
- Owner: Carson Coffman & George Pfenenger
- Number of employees: 200
- Website: https://www.socket.net

Socket is a Missouri-based telecommunications provider, with its headquarters in Columbia, Missouri. Socket is a privately held company and offers local and long distance phone service, as well as fiber-optic internet, and data technology to residents and businesses across Missouri.

== History ==
Founded in 1994 by George Pfenenger and John Dupuy, Socket Internet quickly became the largest local internet provider in Missouri. In 2001 Inc. (magazine) ranked Socket Internet 136th on its list of America's Top 500 Fastest-Growing Privately Held Companies, an award it would win three times. Also in 2001, Technology Fast 50 ranked Socket 4th in The Fast 50, which recognizes the 50 fastest growing technology companies in a given geographic area. In 2004, Socket expanded into the telephone industry, offering business telephone and networking services.

In 2008, the company began offering residential telephone service in select markets.

In 2010, Socket was awarded $23.7 million from the American Recovery and Reinvestment Act of 2009 to deploy a fiber-to-the-home network in Callaway County. Construction for the project began in late 2011 with the first residential customers Fiber Internet service being installed in May 2012. The project is expected to have a major impact in Millersburg, MO and Callaway County where residents are limited to dial-up and satellite Internet options.

The company offers flat rate pricing as well as no contract Internet services.

== Headquarters ==
Originally located near the west end of Business Loop 70 in Columbia, MO, the company headquarters were moved to an office building on Cherry Street in the downtown area, eventually expanding to include space below what is now Glenn's Cafe and the Tiger Hotel.

In early 2007, Socket moved to their current headquarters at 2703 Clark Lane in Columbia, the former site of Boyce & Bynum Pathology Laboratories.

== Sponsorships ==
Socket was a sponsor of the short-lived Mid-Missouri Mavericks, a minor league baseball team, through the 2004 & 2005 seasons. The sponsorship ended with the dissolution of the team in early 2006.

Socket is a current sponsor of Missouri Tigers football and Missouri Tigers men's basketball, including the Socket Post-Game Show with Mike Kelly.
