= Slackers CDs and Games =

Chain of entertainment retailers

- Type: Private
- Industry: Retail
- Founded: Columbia, Missouri, U.S., 1993
- Founder: Kurt Jellinek; Paul Zacharias
- Headquarters: 1010 East Broadway; Columbia, Missouri, USA
- Number of locations: 9 stores (2021)
- Area served: Midwestern United States
- Products: Video Games; Music; Movies
- Website: http://slackers.com/

Slackers CDs and Games, often shortened to Slackers, is a small chain of entertainment retailers located in the Midwestern United States. The store specializes in both new and used video games and music. It was founded in 1993 in Columbia, Missouri by Kurt Jellinek and Paul Zacharias, originally as a music store. The store is known for selling local independent music, its collection of classic games, and for giving good credit for trade-ins. In 2007, the store raised some controversy for stockpiling Nintendo Wiis. As of 2021, there are 9 locations in Missouri and Illinois.

Jellinek has said that the name "Slackers" comes from being a slacker in college—playing video games and listening to music during their free time. A new store would be opened every few years, in various separate locations, so as not to lose business by placing two stores close together. Jellinek and Zacharias manage the chain of stores with a hands-on approach.

== History ==
Slackers CDs and Games in Columbia, Missouri

The original idea behind Slackers first occurred in 1990. Along with some friends, Kurt Jellinek and Paul Zacharias went to a Don Henley concert, and began thinking about owning their own music store. At the time, the two were undergraduate students, and decided to focus their studies on business management and becoming entrepreneurs. Slackers CDs and Games was officially founded in 1993, by Jellinek and Zacharias, in Columbia, Missouri. Jellinek and Zacharias opened the store after graduating from Saint Louis University, using only their own collection of 1,500 music CDs. The name originated from Generation X being considered slackers before being given a chance to prove otherwise. Although business was slow at first, with the store sometimes only making US$30 in a day, business eventually increased. After 2 years they were able to open a second location in O'Fallon, Illinois. As of 2009, there are 10 locations in the states of Missouri and Illinois, eight of which are in the St. Louis Metropolitan Area, and two of which are in Mid-Missouri.

== Praise and criticism ==
Slackers CDs and Games won an award for best used CD store in 2006 from the Riverfront Times. The Riverfront Times cited its collection of vinyl records and independent and rare music CDs as the basis for the award.

Since the store buys video games from all consoles, it is known for its collection of classic titles. However, they do not require the box or manual for cartridge based games.

The store is also known for giving more credit for trade-ins than its competitors. In 2005, Vox Magazine had the same four games (Halo, Metal Gear Solid 3: Snake Eater, NHL 2004, and Madden NFL 2005) priced at EB Games, Game Crazy, and Slackers CDs and Games, with the trade-in values being $16.50, $26.82, and $45 respectively.

=== Wii Controversy ===
On December 20, 2007, the store raised some controversy when Ars Technica reported that the chain was stockpiling Nintendo Wii systems to sell at a higher profit while telling retail customers that the chain did not have any systems in stock, and were not expecting any.

On December 21, 2007, Kurt Jellinek responded on the Slackers website by stating that the article was sensationalist and misleading. Jellinek said that, of the 44 units the chain had, five were sold on eBay for $399.99, with a couple of units still in stock, and 35 were held for specific customers and sold at the MSRP. The remainder were given away. Some sites believe this may violate Nintendo's enforcement of the Wii's $249 retail price, and may prevent the store from receiving future products from Nintendo. Nintendo has refused to comment on the issue.
