= East Campus Neighborhood =

- East Campus Neighborhood Historic District
- U.S. National Register of Historic Places
- U.S. Historic district
- 1316 Anthony Street

- Location within Missouri Location within the United States
- Location: Roughly bounded by Bouchelle, College, University and High Sts. including parts of Willis, Bass, Dorsey and Anthony Sts., Columbia, Missouri
- Coordinates: 38°56′44″N 92°19′7″W
- Area: 59.9 acres (24.2 ha)
- Architect: Jamieson, James; Ghio, Augustus, et al.
- Architectural style: Tudor Revival, Colonial Revival, Bungalow/craftsman
- NRHP reference No.: 96000019
- Added to NRHP: February 16, 1996

East Campus is a neighborhood of Columbia, Missouri directly east of the University of Missouri and downtown Columbia. The area contains historic residential property as well many Greek student organizations houses. The district contains parts of Stephens College, the Boone Hospital Center's campus and the historic Lee Street Deli. It developed between about 1895 and 1945, and includes representative examples of Tudor Revival, Colonial Revival, and Bungalow / American Craftsman style architecture.

A historic district of much of the neighborhood was listed on the National Register of Historic Places in 1996 as East Campus Neighborhood Historic District. The district encompasses 262 contributing buildings and 5 contributing structures.
