= Columbia Agriculture Park =

Park in Columbia, Missouri

Coordinates: 38°57′30.22″N 92°21′53.04″W

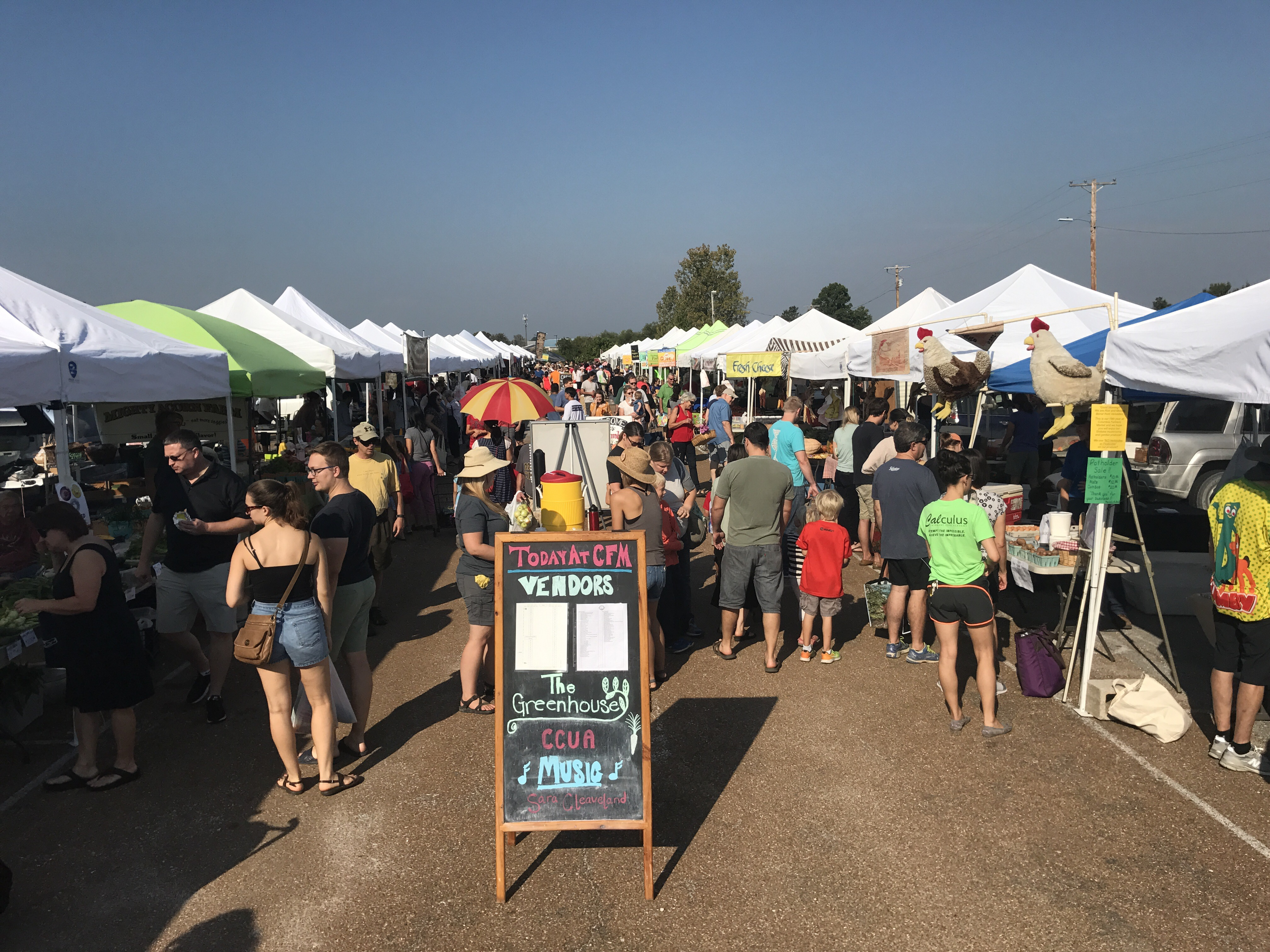
The Columbia Farmers Market in 2017

The Columbia Agriculture Park is a public park in Columbia, Missouri, focusing on food production and distribution. It is home to the Columbia Farmers Market, and contains a pavilion with space for 98 vendors. The park opened in 2019 and by 2021 will include an interactive urban farm, demonstration gardens and orchards, a commercial kitchen, event space, a recreational trail, amphitheater, outdoor classroom, and playground. It will also house the offices of the Columbia Center for Urban Agriculture and a resource center. The park was created by a public-private partnership between Columbia Parks and Recreation, the Columbia Farmers Market, the Columbia Center for Urban Agriculture, and Sustainable Farms and Communities. It is the first of its kind in Missouri.

== History ==
The site has a long agricultural history, for most of the 20th century it was the location of the Boone County Fair. Ground was broken in 2017 and the park opened in July 2019.
