= Veterans United Home Loans =

American mortgage company

- Company type: Private
- Industry: Mortgage Lending
- Founded: 2002; 23 years ago
- Headquarters: Columbia, Missouri
- Number of locations: 28
- Key people: Nathan Long (CEO)
- Products: VA Loans; 15- and 30-Year Fixed-Rate Mortgages; Jumbo Loans
- Number of employees: 3176
- Website: https://www.veteransunited.com/

Veterans United Home Loans is a full service mortgage lender headquartered in Columbia, Missouri. The company has 28 offices nationwide and is licensed in all 50 states. The company primarily originates VA loans, a mortgage product guaranteed by the U.S. Department of Veterans Affairs.

Veterans United is the largest VA lender in the nation, financing $19.29 billion in total VA loan volume for 2024, up from $17.65 billion in 2023.

== History ==
Veterans United Home Loans was founded in 2002 by brothers Brant and Brock Bukowsky. In 2003, the company named Nathan Long as CEO.

In 2007, Inc. put the company at No. 96 on its list of the 500 fastest-growing private companies based on its three-year sales growth of 1,553.3 percent and loan volume of $10.2 million.

In November 2011, Veterans United launched a 501(c)(3) charitable entity, Veterans United Foundation. A year later Inc. magazine named Veterans United the No. 29 top job creator in the country in 2012.

Veterans United financed $4.1 billion in 2013, accounting for 3% of the VA's total loan volume. The company held 4.4% of the VA loan market share in 2014.

In January 2016, the Virginia Beach Amphitheater announced a 4-year naming rights agreement with Veterans United to rename the venue to The Veterans United Home Loans Amphitheater.

In 2020, Veterans United was named to Fortune Magazine's 100 Best Companies to Work For list for the fifth consecutive year - ranking number 17 overall. Veterans United ranked No. 23 in 2019, No. 32 in 2018, No. 27 in 2017 and No. 30 in 2016.

In 2024, Veterans United financed 58,253 VA loans and was the number 1 VA lender for the 2024 fiscal year. Making up approximately 15% of all VA loans financed. In 2024 Veterans United was also ranked number 5 on People Magazine's "Companies That Care" rankings. Veterans United was also Ranked 69 in Fortune Magazine "Great Place to Work".

== Financial growth ==
Year	Loans financed
2024	$19.3 billion
2023	$17.6 billion
2022	$26.5 billion
2021	$28.6 billion
2020	$23.2 billion
2019	$12.8 billion
2018	$10.4 billion
2017	$10.2 billion
2016	$10.3 billion
2015	$7.3 billion
2014	$5.1 billion
2013	$4.1 billion
2012	$3.3 billion
2009	$1 billion

== See also ==
- Veterans United Home Loans Amphitheater
