= Shakespeare's Pizza =

Pizzeria in Columbia, Missouri, United States

Coordinates: 38.94869°N 92.327712°W

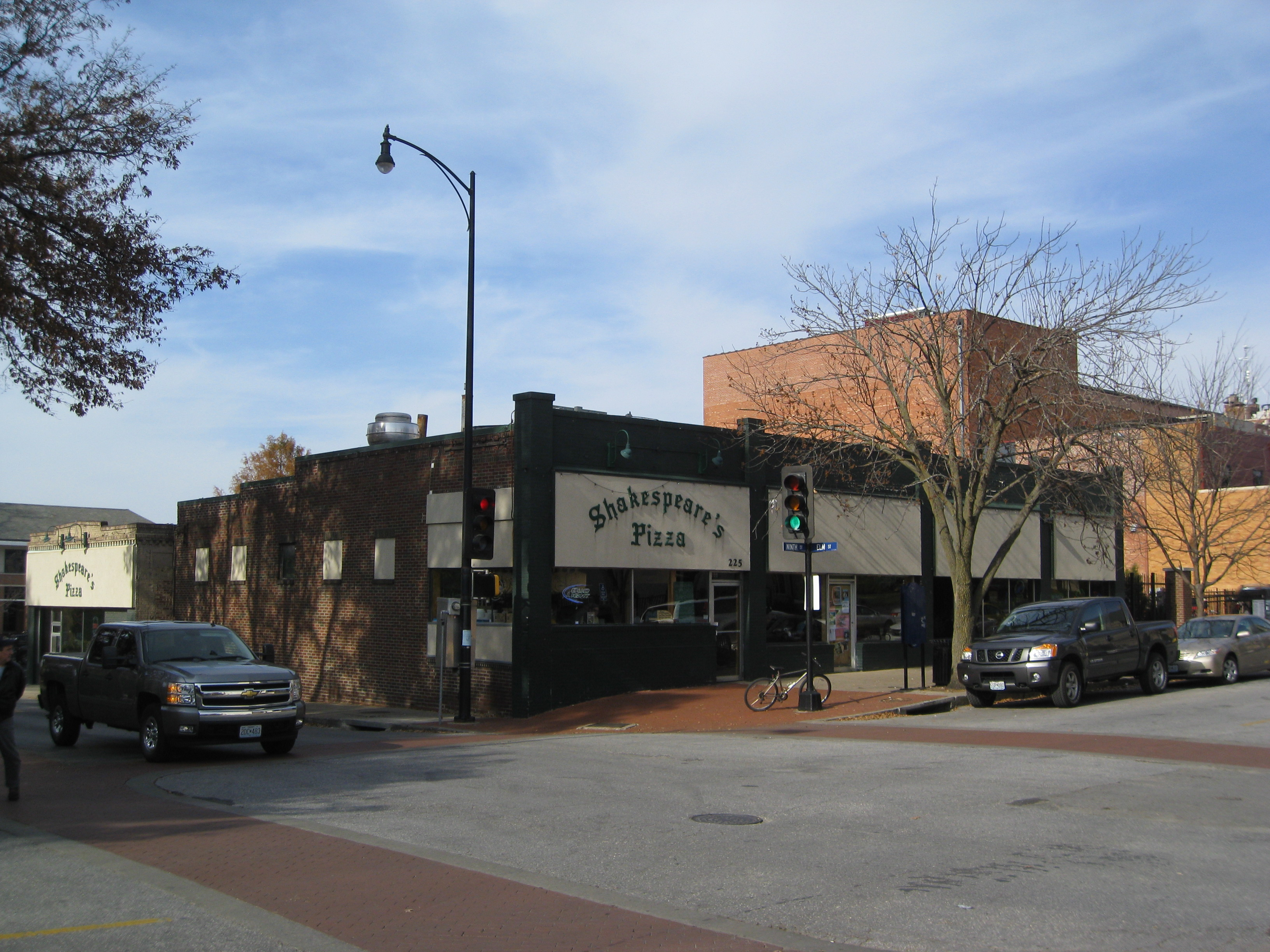
- Original location at 9th & Elm
- Type: Private
- Industry: Restaurant
- Founded: Columbia, Missouri, US, 1973
- Headquarters: 225 South 9th Street; Columbia, Missouri, USA
- Number of locations: 3
- Area served: Columbia, Missouri, United States
- Products: Pizza; Beer; Frozen pizza
- Owner: Nancy Lewis
- Website: http://www.shakespeares.com

Shakespeare's Pizza, founded in 1973, is a landmark in Columbia, Missouri, USA, known for its popular pizza and unconventional decor. In November 2010, Shakespeare's was the winner of “Best Bites Challenge: College Edition” on ABC's Good Morning America.

== Locations ==
Shakespeare's Pizza has three locations in Columbia. The original restaurant was located at 9th and Elm, across the street from the campus of the University of Missouri. It has since reopened in a new building at the same location. Much of the decor and some of the old building materials were re-used in the new building. A second location opened in 2004 and is often referred to as Shakespeare's West and is located at the corner of West Broadway and Broadfield Drive, on the west side of the town. A third location (Shakespeare's South) opened on Peachtree Drive, off Providence Road on the south side of Columbia in 2012. On April 1, 2015, it was announced that the iconic downtown location would be demolished and reconstructed with additional student housing built on atop. The renovated downtown location reopened in 2016.

== Frozen pizza ==
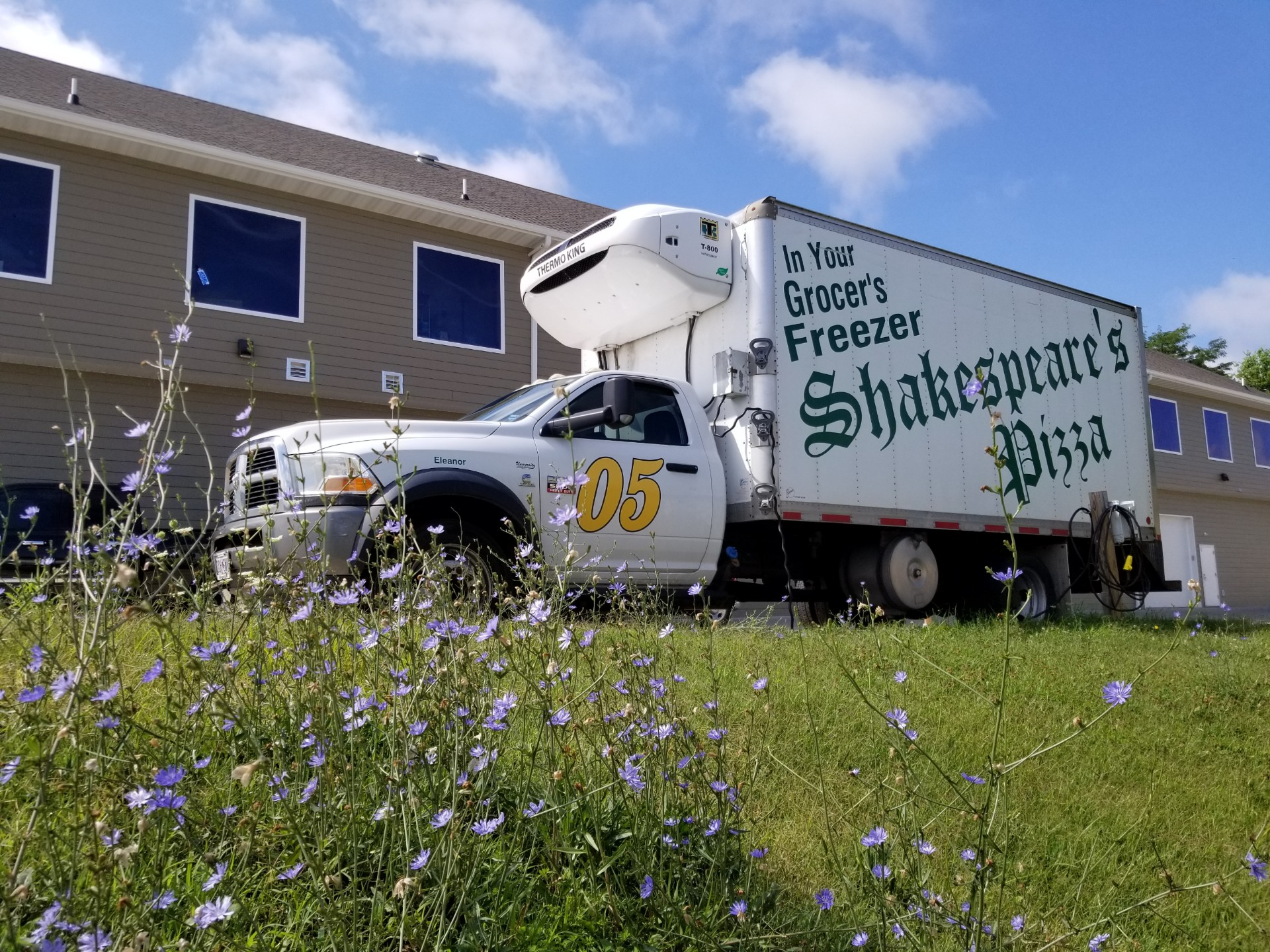
A Shakespeare's frozen pizza delivery truck

Frozen Shakespeare's pizza is available at grocery stores in Columbia, Mid-Missouri, Kansas City, St. Louis and Springfield. It is also available for purchase online and ships to 23 states including Missouri. Shakespeare's Frozen is also a popular fundraiser throughout the Midwest.
