= EquipmentShare =

American tech company

- Type: Public
- Traded as: Nasdaq: EQPT
- Industry: Construction & Technology
- Founded: 2015; 11 years ago
- Founders: Jeff Lowe; Matthew McDonald; William Schlacks; Jabbok Schlacks; Brad Siegler
- Headquarters: Columbia, Missouri
- Number of locations: 448
- Key people: Jabbok and Willy Schlacks
- Products: Construction equipment rental, sales, and technology services
- Number of employees: 9,700+
- Website: https://www.equipmentshare.com

EquipmentShare.com Inc is an American company specializing in construction equipment rental, sales, and technology services. It was founded in 2015 and is based in Columbia, Missouri. As of July 2026, there are 448 locations in 45 U.S. States. The company has seen rapid growth, with 95 locations opening in 2025 alone.

On January 13, 2026 the company announced they are targeting $6 billion valuation in their pending IPO. The IPO was completed on January 23rd, 2026 with a sale price of $24.50 per share and the company collectively raised $747 million.

== History ==
As teenagers, brothers Jabbok and Willy Schlacks formed businesses across construction, technology and general contracting. By 2013, the brothers began working on an idea that would disrupt an archaic industry – construction. In 2014, fueled by their firsthand understanding of the chaos that comes with being a contractor, they pitched their idea of a peer-to-peer equipment marketplace at Startup Weekend in Columbia, Mo, and won. In 2015, the Schlacks brothers, along with co-founders Jeff Lowe, Matthew McDonald, and Brad Siegler were accepted into Y Combinator for the Winter 2015 batch.

In 2023, EquipmentShare closed a $3 billion senior secured asset-based revolving credit facility with Capital One Bank. In 2025, EquipmentShare opened its Technology and Development Center as an expansion of its Columbia, Mo. headquarters. The facility cost $100 million and aims to create 500 jobs in the Columbia area. Several city and state officials attended the center’s grand opening, including Missouri Governor Mike Kehoe. Each EquipmentShare employee receives 16 hours of paid volunteer time per year and can contribute to company-wide initiatives like Back to School Buckets and Buckets of Joy.

== Technology ==
T3™ is EquipmentShare’s proprietary, cloud-based fleet management platform designed to provide centralized visibility and control over construction operations. The platform includes features such as real-time telematics, digital work orders, time tracking, preventive maintenance scheduling, and location tracking. Hardware like GPS trackers and access control keypads help support theft prevention, increase equipment utilization, and eliminate unplanned downtime.

In 2025, EquipmentShare was named "Fleet Management Technology Company of the Year" by AutoTech Breakthrough, and was included in Construction Executive’s 2025 Top Tech™ report, which highlights leading technology providers serving the construction industry. In November 2025, EquipmentShare was ranked No. 4 on The Software Report’s Top 50 Software Companies of 2025. The company was also awarded the 2025 Gold Stevie® Award for Business Technology Company of the year.

As of July 2026, the company manages more than 397,000 assets through T3.
