= Haden Opera House =

Opera house in Columbia, Missouri that burned down in 1901

General information
- Address: 901 East Broadway
- Town or city: Columbia, Missouri
- Country: United States
- Coordinates: 38°57′6.43″N 92°19′38.29″W
- Completed: 1878
- Opened: January 18, 1884
- Destroyed: February 23, 1901, by a fire

Haden Opera House was a performance venue in Columbia, Missouri, until it burned down in 1901

== History ==
Haden was constructed sometime in 1878, and opened on January 18, 1884. It was named after the owner, Joel H. Haden. The opera house was remodeled to seat 1,246 people with two balconies and four private boxes, the opera house also showed the first movie in Columbia. On February 23, 1901, the opera house was destroyed by a fire.
