= Columbia College (Missouri) =

Private college in Columbia, Missouri, US

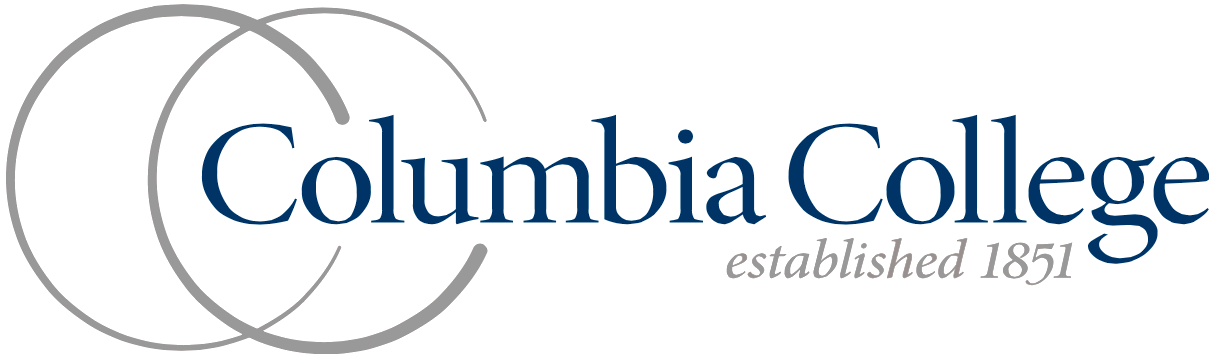
- Other name: Columbia College of Missouri
- Former name: Christian College (1851–1970)
- Motto: Magnanimiter Crucem Sustine (Latin)
- Motto in English: Valiantly bear the cross
- Type: Private college
- Established: 1851; 175 years ago
- Religious affiliation: Non-sectarian although historically related to Christian Church (Disciples of Christ)
- Endowment: $154.7 million (2025)
- President: Toby Arquette
- Academic staff: 67 full-time 325 part-time (fall 2023)
- Students: 6,046 (fall 2023)
- Location: Columbia, Missouri, U.S. 38°57′27″N 92°19′36″W
- Campus: Urban, 231 acres (0.93 km^{2})
- Colors: Navy blue & silver
- Nickname: Cougars
- Sporting affiliations: NAIA – American Midwest
- Website: www.ccis.edu

Columbia College, also known as Columbia College of Missouri, is a private college based in Columbia, Missouri, United States. Founded in 1851 as a nonsectarian college, it has retained a covenant with the Christian Church (Disciples of Christ) since its inception. The college celebrated its 175th anniversary in 2026, when it also eclipsed 100,000 alumni. In addition to its main campus, the college maintains an online program and operates at 15 locations across 10 U.S. states, with many of them on U.S. military bases.

== History ==
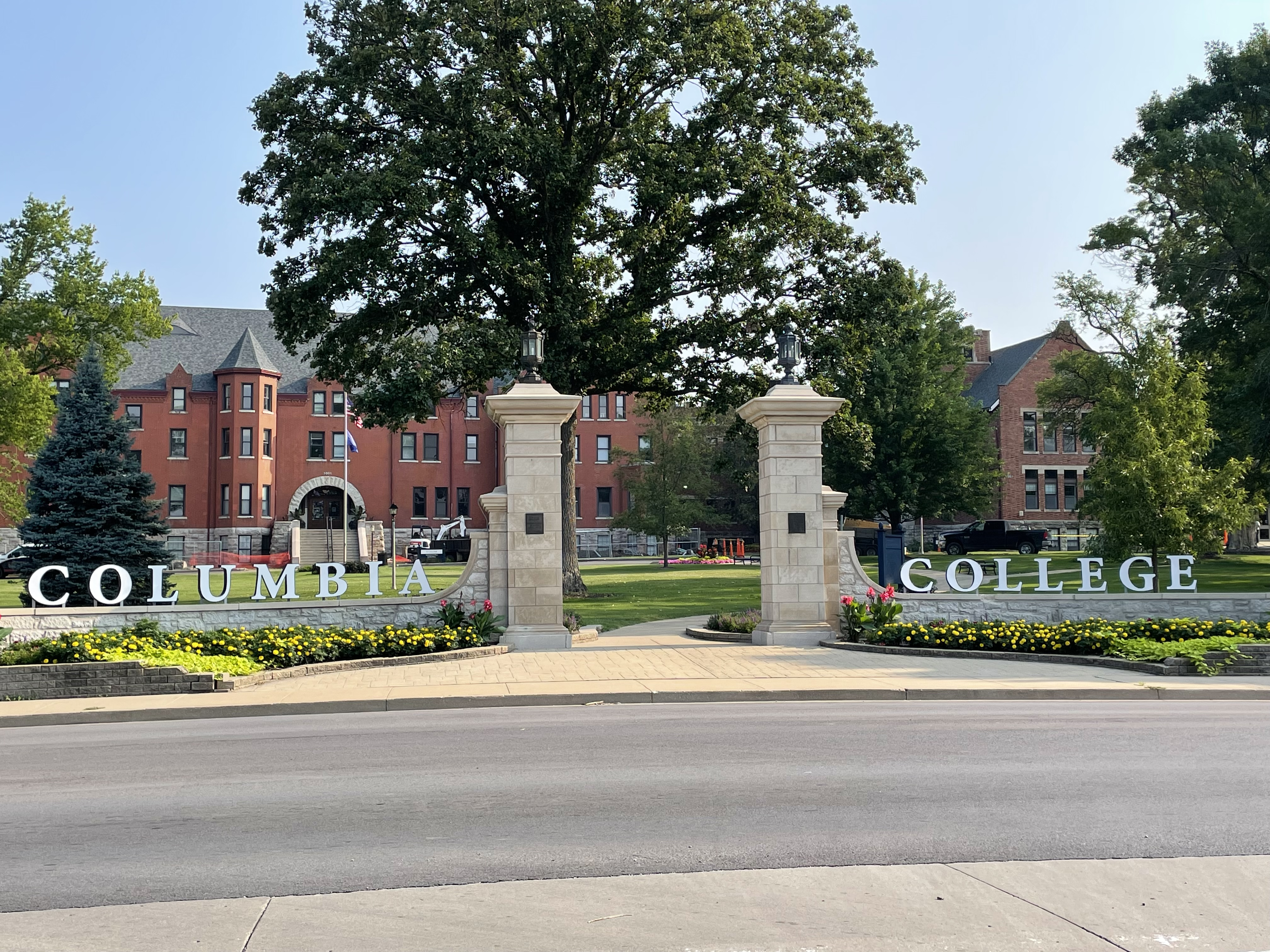
Columbia College gateway in July 2021

=== 1850s ===
Christian Female College received its charter from the Missouri Legislature on January 18, 1851, making it the first women's college west of the Mississippi River to be chartered by a state legislature. The city of Columbia strongly supported female education, in part because the University of Missouri did not yet admit women. Columbia was also home to Stephens College, founded in 1833 and chartered in 1856. Infrastructure was a problem; the first classes were held in an unfinished mansion.

A typical day for female students in 1851 started at 6 a.m. with a morning walk, followed by worship in the chapel. They attended classes until late afternoon and then wrote a daily composition. After they studied and did chores, the students attended a Bible lecture every evening. They studied arithmetic, ancient history, grammar, ancient geography, philosophy, the five books of Moses, and composition. The college purchased the estate of Dr. James Bennett and formally dedicated the buildings and grounds as the Christian College campus in 1852. By 1856, there were 150 students, including 85 boarders.

=== 1860s ===
During the Civil War, Christian College President Joseph K. Rogers vowed to keep the school open. The majority of the city of Columbia was pro-Union, but the surrounding agricultural areas of Boone County and the rest of central Missouri were decidedly pro-slavery. Rogers was successful, thanks in part to faculty who relinquished pay.

President Rogers insisted the college remain neutral and did not allow newspapers on the grounds, but privately he read them. As the fighting continued, so did the fight for the college's survival. Only three students graduated in 1862, and four the following year. However, Christian College never missed a day of classes. After the war, Christian College saw its largest enrollment to date, with 182 students taught by nine faculty members.

=== 1890s–1920s ===
Growth continued through the start of the 20th century, especially under Luella St. Clair Moss, a "steam engine in petticoats." St. Clair served three different terms as president of the college between 1893 and 1920, and was one of the first female college presidents in the country.

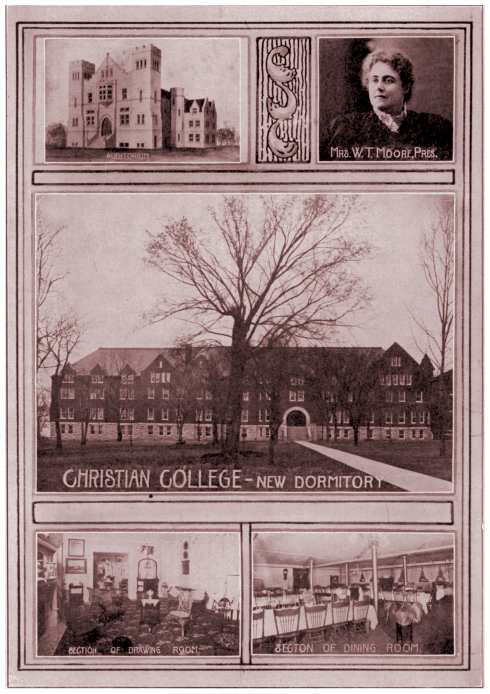
Columbia College (then Christian College), 1904

During her administration, she spearheaded the construction of four new buildings—St. Clair Hall, Dorsey Hall, Launer Auditorium and Missouri Hall—all of which are still in use today. She doubled the size of the faculty, held the first Ivy Chain ceremony, launched a college magazine, created a college orchestra, and started a women's basketball team. She also implemented the then-innovative cap-and-gown uniform, rather than the previous bonnets. She also changed the college from a four-year school to one of the first accredited junior colleges in the country.

=== 1960s–present ===
In 1970 the college changed from a four-year conservative all-female college to a liberal coeducational college, and changed its name to Columbia College. Between 1970 and 1971, more than 70 courses as daring as cycling and flying were added to the curriculum; all graduation requirements except freshman English and a GPA of 2.5 were dropped; more foreign students were admitted; and a host of lifestyle choices such as off-campus living for juniors, a relaxed dress code, and smoking were allowed. President W. Merle Hill said in 1971 that the time had come to openly allow discussions of poverty, the Vietnam War, racism, sex, drugs and abortion. All of this was a radical departure from the college's conservative heritage and alienated some students and alumni.

President W. Merle Hill said in 1971, "I would like to bring education screaming and kicking into the 1970s. Then we would only be about 70 years behind. ... Instead of pounding something into students' heads, you have to permit young people to create their own lifestyle. If you dictate, they will rebel. The best way to teach is to let your own lifestyle be such that they want to follow, not rebel."

The college began educating military personnel in St. Louis at the request of the military, making it one of the first colleges in the country with extended campuses on military bases. This was the start of the Extended Studies Division first headed up by Dr. William Brown, who would later serve as executive vice president of the college.

Two years later, the college launched the Evening Campus, geared to adult learners and nontraditional students. Columbia was the first college in the city to offer evening classes.

Today, the college has 33 extended campuses around the country, serving more than 25,000 military and civilian students each year, including one in Guantanamo Bay, Cuba.

In 1995, Columbia College offered its first graduate degree with a Master of Arts in Teaching, followed by a Master of Business Administration and a Master of Science in Criminal Justice. These degrees are offered through evening classes in Columbia, and at select extended campuses around the country. In 2000, the college launched its online campus, which now offers more than 500 online courses and 18 online degrees.

The Columbia College Cougars women's volleyball program captured two consecutive National Association of Intercollegiate Athletics (NAIA) championships in 1998 and 1999 with perfect 45–0 and 44–0 records, respectively.

== Locations and campuses ==
Columbia College overall student body composition as of fall 2022
Undergraduates	5675
Race and ethnicity	
White	54%
Latino	12%
Black	21%
Native American	1%
Asian	2%
2 or more races	6%
	Age
Undergraduates 25 or older	69%
Other	Percentage
Out-of-state students	42%
In state students	56%
Foreign	1%

Day Campus student body composition as of October 15, 2023
Undergraduates	860
Race and ethnicity	Total
White	644
International	58
Latino	48
Black	48
Native American	2
Asian	13
Island Pacificer	1
2 or more races	42
Other	12
Age	
Undergraduates 25 or older	10.9%
Average age	21
Other	Percentage
Out-of-state students	13.3%

The main location in Columbia has two campuses, the Day Campus and the Evening Campus.

The Evening Campus is geared for adult learners and nontraditional students. In 2019, more than 9,400 students graduated from the Evening Campus. As of 2023, the Evening Campus had 724 students. The Day Campus is for traditional students.

== Academics ==
The college's academic divisions include:

- Visual Arts and Music Department
- Business Administration Department
- Computer and Mathematical Sciences Department
- Criminal Justice and Human Services Department
- Division of Adult Higher Education
- Education Department
- Evening Campus Office
- Graduate Studies
- History and Political Science Department
- Humanities Department
- International Programs
- Nursing Program
- Psychology and Sociology Department
- Science Department

=== Admissions ===
CC has an open admissions policy. Students for the online campus, satellite campuses, and the Evening Campus in Columbia need to complete high school or an equivalency test.

However, the Day Campus is selective. Applicants who are denied admission to the Day Campus may apply to the other Columbia College campuses, and reapply to the Day Campus after completing six credits with a C or higher.

==== Day Campus admissions ====
Admissions for the Day Campus are divided into three types: new freshmen, transfer freshman, and transfer students.

===== First-time applicants =====
	2013	2014	2015	2016	2017	2018	2019	2020	2021	2022	2023
Applicants	616	616	724	1580	1589	1796	2390	2245	1816	1219	1874
Admitted	439	119	437	801	831	870	1054	1011	975	891	1078
Enrolled	133	116	125	203	174	146	141	158	172	172	198
Admit rate	71%	19%	60%	50%	52%	48%	44%	45%	53%	73%	57%

In 1991 the acceptance rate for first-time applications was 83%. However, in 2008, the acceptance rate became moderately selective, at 53% for first-time applicants. The average high school GPA for first-time applicants was 3.6 in 2023.

Freshmen applicants need a high school GPA of 2.5 or 3.0 and an ACT of 21, or SAT score of 1060, or ranking in the top 50% of their graduating class. If freshmen do not meet the ACT or SAT requirements, they need a successful completion of the following:

- Four units of English
- Three units of Mathematics (two years of algebra and one year of geometry)
- Three units of Science
- Two units of Social Studies

===== Transfer applicants =====
	2013	2014	2015	2016	2017	2018	2019	2020	2021	2022	2023
Applicants	529	365	447	601	619	642	672	643	435	314	530
Admitted	349	109	272	326	329	321	294	245	204	214	218
Enrolled	172	104	108	146	136	127	88	99	75	96	84
Admit rate	65%	29%	61%	54%	53%	50%	44%	38%	47%	68%	41%

At the Day Campus, the acceptance rate for transfer students is minimally selective.

Only courses graded with a C can be transferred.

=== Rankings ===
In 2014, Columbia College was named a "Best Midwestern College" by The Princeton Review.

== Student outcomes ==
According to College Scorecard, the median income in 2020 and 2021 for graduates who matriculated in 2010 and 2011 was $45,378, with 66% of graduates making more than high school graduates.

According to PayScale, the early career pay for CC graduates is $48,000 and $74,600 for mid-career.

The Center on Education and the Workforce estimated that the return on investment with a bachelor's at CC is $37,000 10 years after graduation; this increases to $755,000 40 years after graduation.

=== Graduation rate ===
According the College Scorecard, the overall graduation rate at Columbia College is 33%. With the graduation rate for transfer students at 39% and 21% who started college at Columbia College.

At the Day Campus, the graduation rate for full/first time students is 62% in six years. For the 2016 cohort, the six-year graduation was 62% (bachelor's degree seekers), 2015 cohort 55%, 2014 cohort 53%, 2013 cohort 59%, 2012 cohort 60%, 2011 cohort 44%, 2010 cohort 51%, 2009 cohort 46%, 2008 cohort 38%, 2007 cohort 41%, and 2006 cohort 43%.

== Athletics ==
The Columbia athletic teams are called the Cougars. The college is a member of the National Association of Intercollegiate Athletics (NAIA), primarily competing in the American Midwest Conference (AMC) since the 1986–87 academic year.

Columbia competes in 18 intercollegiate varsity sports. Men's sports include baseball, basketball, cross country, golf, lacrosse, soccer, and track & field; women's sports include basketball, bowling, cross country, golf, soccer, softball, track & field, and volleyball; and co-ed sports include competitive cheer, competitive dance, and eSports.

== Notable people ==
=== Alumni ===
- Sandy Adams, former US congresswoman from Florida
- Avery Bourne, current member of the Illinois House of Representatives
- Deborah Bryant, Miss America 1966
- Jane Froman, 1930–1950s singer, actress
- Arliss Howard, actor, writer and director
- Tim Kennedy, wrestler and mixed martial artist
- Darren LaBonte, CIA officer killed in Camp Chapman attack in 2009
- Gloria McCloskey, All-American Girls Professional Baseball League player, voted Christian College's Athletic Queen in 1955
- Charles McGee, Tuskegee Airman, U.S. Air Force brigadier general
- Sally Rand, fan dancer and early movie star
- Lavinia "Vinnie" Ream, sculptor of Lincoln statue in U.S. Capitol rotunda
- Margaret Rose Sanford, First Lady of North Carolina
- Clem Smith, Missouri state representative from St. Louis County
- Ron Stallworth, African-American police officer responsible for infiltrating the KKK, author of Black Klansman (2014)
- Julie Stevens, radio actress
- Larry Young, bronze medal in racewalking, '68 Mexico City and '72 Munich Olympics; sculptor

=== Faculty ===
- Judy Baker, former Missouri state representative
- Bob Burchard

== Bibliography ==
- Batterson, Paulina A. (2001). Columbia College: 150 Years of Courage, Commitment, and Change. Columbia, Missouri: University of Missouri Press. ISBN 9780826213242.
- Hale, Allean Lemmon (1956). Petticoat Pioneer: The Christian College Story 1851-1951. Columbia, Missouri: Artcraft Press.
- Dains, Mary K. (1996). Guided by the Hand of God: The History of First Christian Church Columbia, MIssouri 1832-1996. Columbia, Missouri: First Christian Church.
