= Stephens College =

Women's college in Columbia, Missouri, US

- Former names: Columbia Female Academy (1833–1856); Columbia Female Baptist Academy (1856–1870)
- Type: Private women's college
- Established: 1833; 193 years ago
- President: Shannon B. Lundeen
- Students: 593 (fall 2021)
- Undergraduates: 407
- Postgraduates: 183
- Location: Columbia, Missouri, U.S. 38.9500°N 92.3225°W
- Campus: Urban, 86-acre (35 ha)
- Colors: Maroon and gold
- Nickname: Stars
- Sporting affiliations: NAIA – American Midwest
- Website: www.stephens.edu

Stephens College is a private women's college in Columbia, Missouri, United States. It is the second-oldest women's educational establishment that is still a women's college in the United States. It was founded on August 24, 1833, as the Columbia Female Academy.

In 1856, David H. Hickman helped secure the college's charter under the name The Columbia Female Baptist Academy. From 1937 to 1943, its Drama Department became renowned under its chairman and teacher, the actress Maude Adams, James M. Barrie's first American Peter Pan. The campus includes a National Historic District: Stephens College South Campus Historic District.

The college enrolled 593 students in the fall of 2021.

== History ==
Stephens College was established in 1833 as the Columbia Female Academy. In 1855 the school closed and in 1856 reopened as the Columbia Female Baptist Academy. The college changed its name to its current namesake in 1870, in honor of a $20,000 endowment by James L. Stephens.

In 1933, the school officially began using 1833 as its opening date. Prior to this time the school advertised itself as being organized in 1856.

From 1921 to 1929, Jessie Burrall was employed as head of religious studies, and created a popular bible studies class. These mandatory classes became Vespers, a school tradition that persisted until the 1980s. This was briefly revitalized in the 2010s as Stephens Unplugged.

During World War II, the Pierce Pennant Motor Hotel was used by the aviation program for training and housing. The historic Columbia Municipal Airport was also home to the program.

Lela Raney Wood Hall was built in 1938. It was named after the wife of president James Wood. Originally purposed as a dormitory, over the years it has also served as an academic and administrative building. In 1995, the hall closed due to disrepair. In 2001, a fire caused additional damage. In 2002, Gretchen Bush Kimball (class of 1957) donated 2.5 million dollars for repairs, and the Kimball Ballroom was named in her honor. In addition to the ballroom serving as the main event space on campus, the ‘LRW’ is utilized as the administrative building on campus.

The assembly hall was opened in 1948. Jimmy Carter visited the campus and spoke at the auditorium in 1976. On November 15, 1996, Bob Dylan performed at the Stephens Auditorium. Through the 2000s, the building was underutilized and fell into disrepair. It was demolished in 2013 along with Hillcrest Hall, a dormitory, and the land was sold with plans for a scholarship-funded boarding school. Construction has yet to begin on the Hagan Scholarship Academy.

The annual Collections fashion show begun in 1944.

The theater program begun its summer season in 1936. The first season at the Okoboji Summer Theatre in Iowa opened in 1958. Stephens has continued to produce plays here in the summer season, serving as an intensive program for students in the conservatory.

Stephens Life was formed as the school newspaper in 1929 by Louise Drake.

The Stephens Standard was renamed to the Portfolio in 1962. This would become the Harbinger.

The equestrian program began in 1926. Alongside this, the Prince of Wales riding club was also chartered in 1926. Originally, a student had to have fallen off a horse in order to join the club.

Sororities have been a part of the college since the early 1900s. The Eta chapter of Beta Sigma Omicron was on campus from 1902 to 1925. It was one of a handful of women’s colleges to have sororities in the National Panhellenic Conference. In 2020, Sigma Sigma Sigma closed their chapter by member decision. In 2024, the Kappa Delta national organization closed the chapter.

The Bathers is a bronze statue designed by Oskar Stonorov and Jorio Vivarelli, dedicated in 1967, originally in a reflecting pool outside the library. Due to damage to the nearby buildings the fountain was eventually removed and paved over.

== Academics ==
The college follows a liberal arts curriculum and prior to 2024 had three schools: School of Health Sciences, Conservatory for the Performing Arts, and School of Integrative Studies. The school is in the process of transitioning to two schools: The Women’s College (which comprises the School of Health Sciences and the School of Integrative Studies) and the all-gender Conservatory for the Performing Arts.

In addition to undergraduate programs, Stephens offers some graduate degrees: Master of Education in Counseling (with an emphasis in school counseling or clinical mental health counseling), Master of Fine Arts in Television and Screenwriting, and Master in Physician Assistant Studies.

In 2024, the college launched a trade program.

=== Student outcomes ===
The median income in 2020 and 2021 for graduates who matriculated in 2010 and 2011 was $43,071, with 65% of graduates making more than high school graduates. According to Payscale, graduates make $55,700 in early career and $100,900 in mid-career. The Center on Education and the Workforce estimated that the return on investment with a bachelors at Stephens is $26,000 10 years after graduation, this accelerates to $661,000 40 years after graduation.

== Campus life ==
Stephens College student body as of 2023
| Undergraduates | 532 |
| Gender | |
|---|---|
| Male | 4% |
| Female | 96% |
| Race and ethnicity | |
| White | 57% |
| Black | 10% |
| Asian | 1% |
| Pacific Islander | 0% |
| American Indian or Native Alaskan | 1% |
| Hispanic | 1% |
| 2 or more races | 8% |
| Unknown | 21% |
| U.S. nonresident | 3% |
| Age | |
| Undergraduates 25 or older | 16% |
| Undergraduates under 25 | 89% |
| Other | |
| Out-of-state students | 39% |
| In-state students | 51% |
| International students | 5% |
| Unknown | 5% |

There are a few academic honor societies on campus: Mortar Board (inactive), Psi Chi, Alpha Lambda Delta (inactive), Sigma Tau Delta, Tri-Beta, Kappa Delta Pi, Phi Alpha Delta (inactive), and Sigma Eta Rho. Although Stephens College is no longer a two-year institution, it is the location of the Alpha chapter of Phi Theta Kappa International Honor Society of the Two-Year College.

The student magazine, Stephens Life, is online with a magazine printed once a semester. The college's literary magazine, Harbinger, is released each spring.

Stephens opened pet-friendly residence halls in 2004. The college also allows students to foster shelter animals in exchange for scholarships.

The Warehouse Theatre is a student-run playhouse on campus which stages an average of four different productions per academic season.

=== Ten Ideals ===
Every year 10 graduating students are secretly selected to be the "Ten Ideals". Each student represents one of the ideals. Throughout the year the ten observe and honor students and faculty they deem as upholding the ideals. The identities of the ten are revealed at Honors Convocation.

The Ten Ideals are:

- Respect for our own dignity and the dignity of others, embodied in a sense of social justice
- Courage and persistence
- Independence, autonomy, and self-sufficiency
- Support for others through the willingness to take and give criticism, acceptance, and love
- Sensitivity to the uniqueness and fragility of the natural world of which we are part
- Responsibility for the consequences of our choices
- Belief in our changing selves and in our right to change
- Creativity in the spiritual and aesthetic dimensions of life
- Intelligence that is informed and cultivated, critical yet tolerant
- Leadership which empowers others

=== Citizen Jane Film Festival ===
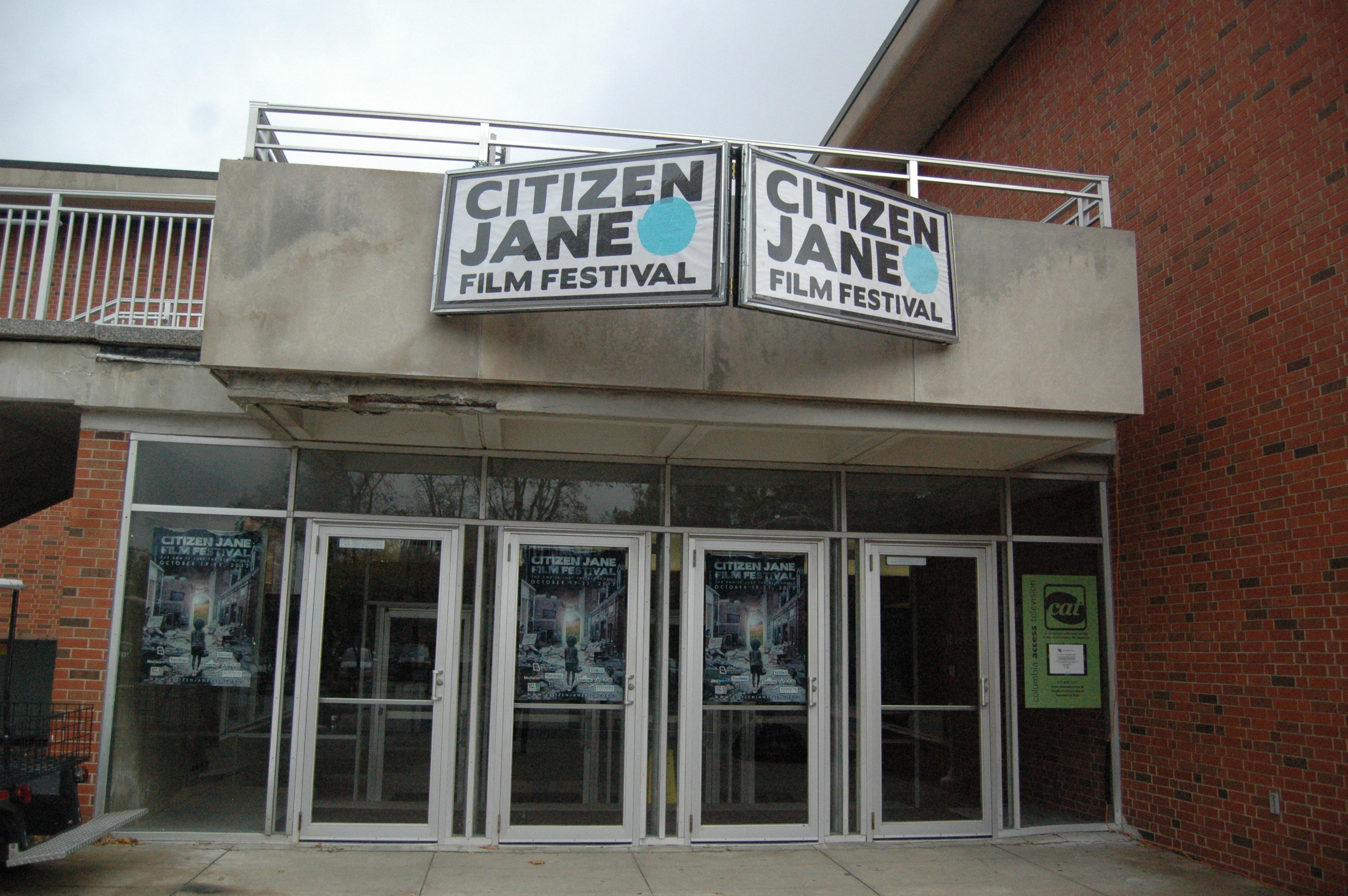
Citizen Jane Film Festival

The Citizen Jane Film Festival was an annual film festival established at Stephens College. The festival was first held October 17–19, 2008. Films were chosen that showcased women behind and in front of the camera. Though the festival has been discontinued, Citizen Jane continues in the form of a lecture series hosted by the Stephens College digital filmmaking program.

== Athletics ==
The Stephens athletic teams are called the Stars. The college is a member of the National Association of Intercollegiate Athletics (NAIA), primarily competing in the American Midwest Conference (AMC) since the 2008–09 academic year. The Stars previously competed as an NAIA Independent from 2004–05 to 2007–08. Prior joining the NAIA, Stephens was also a member of the National Collegiate Athletic Association (NCAA): in the Division III ranks from 1994–95 (when the school re-instated back its athletics program) to 2003–04; and in the Division II ranks from about 1982–83 to 1986–87, before transitioning to club status for two seasons until discontinuing the athletics program after the 1988–89 school year.

Stephens competes in four intercollegiate varsity sports: basketball, soccer, softball and volleyball. Former sports included cross country. Club sports include competitive dance and esports, which is the first varsity esports team at an all-women's college.

== People ==
The Stephens College Alumnae Association has more than 20,000 members internationally. Alumnae are found in every state.

=== Notable alumnae ===
- Patricia Barry, stage, film, and television actress (1921–2016)
- Stephanie Beatriz, actress
- Nancy Elizabeth Brown, vice admiral, United States Navy
- Shirley Clarke (1919–1997), filmmaker known for Portrait of Jason
- Joan Crawford, actress (did not complete first year)
- Frances Crowe (1919–2019), peace activist
- Leslie Easterbrook, actress; best known for her role as Debbie Callahan in the Police Academy series
- Susan Flannery, soap actress best known for The Bold & the Beautiful and Days of Our Lives
- Wally Funk (1939–2026), aviator and astronaut
- Tammy Grimes (1934–2016), actress and singer
- Anne Gwynne (1918–2003), actress known for early scream queen roles
- Corky Hale, jazz musician
- Joan Robinson Hill (1931–1969), equestrienne and socialite, subject of Murder in Texas (film)
- Jeane Kirkpatrick (1926–2006), first female U.S. ambassador to the U.N. and advisor to Ronald Reagan
- Bonnie McElveen-Hunter, businesswoman and former U.S. Ambassador to Finland
- Elizabeth Mitchell, actress
- Martha Beall Mitchell (1918–1976), wife of former U.S. Attorney General John Mitchell; was involved in the Watergate scandal
- Jean Muir (1911–1996), actress, first performer added to the Hollywood Blacklist
- Alanna Nash, journalist and biographer
- Carrie Nye (1936–2006), actress
- Annie Potts, actress
- Jennifer Tilly, actress and poker player
- Dawn Wells (1938–2020), actress best known for Gilligan’s Island
- Paula Zahn, journalist; host of On the Case with Paula Zahn

=== Notable faculty ===
- Lisa Brescia
- H. Bentley Glass, 1936
- Muriel King, director of the Fine and Applied Fashion Department in 1945
- Frances V. Rummell, French instructor in the 1930s

=== Presidents of the college ===
| No. | President | Term | Notes | Source |
|---|---|---|---|---|
| | William R. Rothwell | February 1857 – June 1857 | | |
| | X. X. Buckner | 1858 – 1859 | | |
| | G. W. Pendleton | 1859 – 1860 | | |
| | J. T. Williams | 1860 – 1865 | | |
| | J. A. Hollis | 1865 – 1869 | | |
| | E. S. Dulin | 1870 – 1876 | | |
| | R. P. Rider | 1877 – 1883 | | |
| | T. W. Barrett | 1883 – 1894 | | |
| | Sam F. Taylor | 1894 – 1904 | | |
| | J. R. Pentuff | 1904 – 1905 | | |
| | W. B. Peeler | 1905 – 1910 | | |
| | H. N. Quisenberry | 1910 – March 1, 1912 | | |
| | G. W. Hatcher | March 1, 1912 – June 1, 1912 | Acting president | |
| | James M. Wood | June 1, 1912 – June 3, 1947 | | |
| | Homer P. Rainey | June 3, 1947 – June 30, 1952 | | |
| | Nell Hutchinson | June 30, 1952 – December 1, 1952 | Acting president | |
| | Thomas A. Spragens | December 1, 1952 – November 11, 1957 | | |
| | James G. Rice | November 11, 1957 – 1958 | Acting president | |
| | Seymour Smith | 1958 – 1975 | | |
| | Arland F. Christ-Janer | 1975 – 1983 | | |
| | Patsy Sampson | 1983 – 1994 | First non-acting female president | |
| | Marcia Kierscht | 1994 – 2003 | | |
| | Wendy B. Libby | July 2003 – June 1, 2009 | | |
| | Dianne Lynch | June 2, 2009 – 2025 | | |
| | Shannon B. Lundeen | 2025 – present | | |

== Historic buildings ==
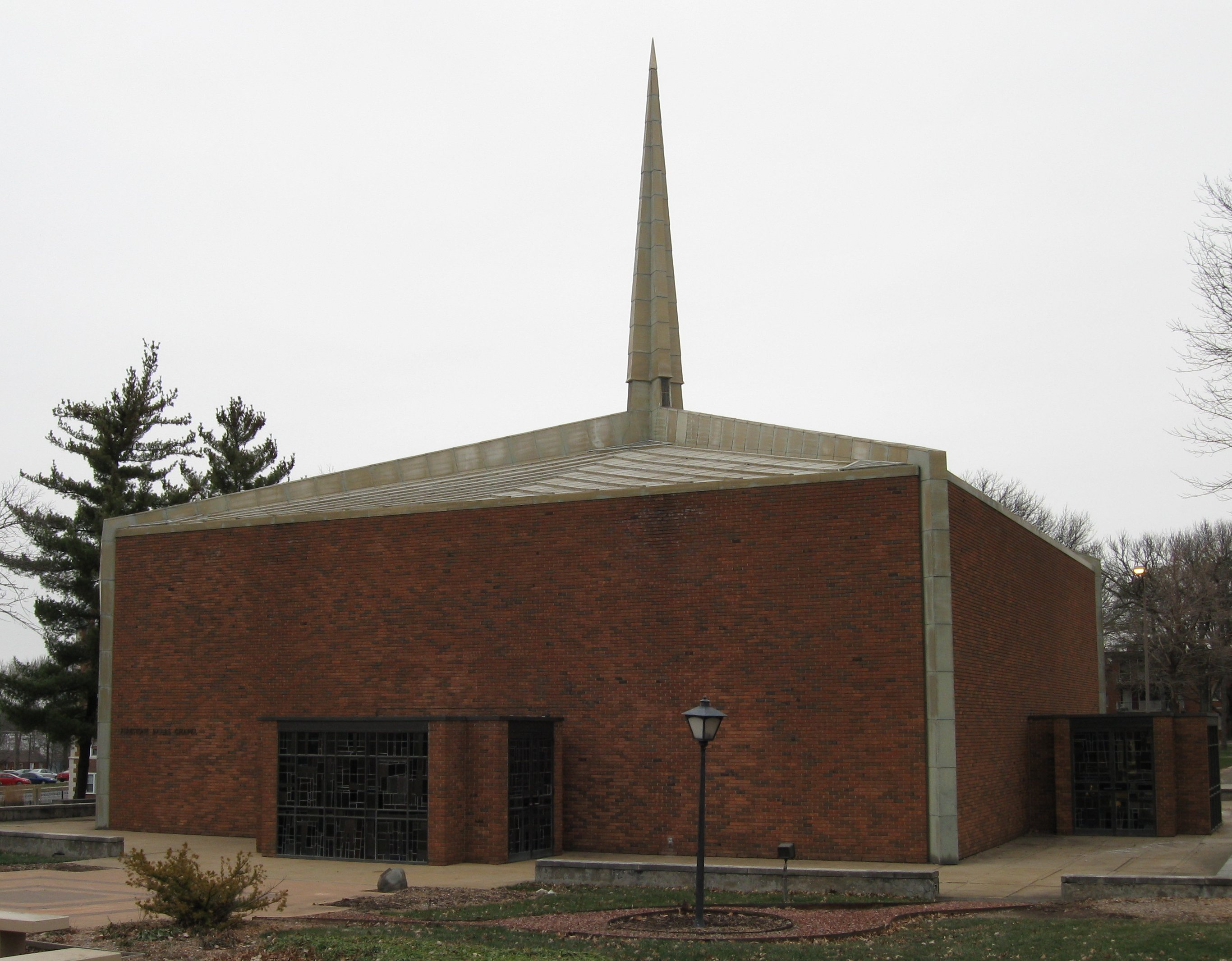
Firestone Baars Chapel

=== Firestone Baars Chapel ===
The Firestone Baars Chapel was designed by world-famous Finnish architect Eero Saarinen, who also designed the Gateway Arch in St. Louis. The chapel symbolizes commitment to individual spiritual development and worship. The chapel is used for meditation, religious services, vespers, weddings, memorials and campus programs.

=== Historic Senior Hall ===
Historic Senior Hall dates back to 1841, when Oliver Parker bought the 8-acre (3.2 ha) tract of land on which the college was first located. In 1857, the Columbia Baptist Female College, which later became Stephens College, acquired the building. Until 1918, Historic Senior Hall was the only dormitory at the college. It was the tradition for the President of the Civic Association (now the Student Government Association) to occupy the first floor room just north of the Waugh Street entrance. Many generations of students feel this building is their tie to the past. A complete restoration of Historic Senior Hall began in the spring of 1987, and the building was rededicated in the spring of 1990. Senior Hall was placed on the National Register of Historic Places in 1977.

The South Quadrangle
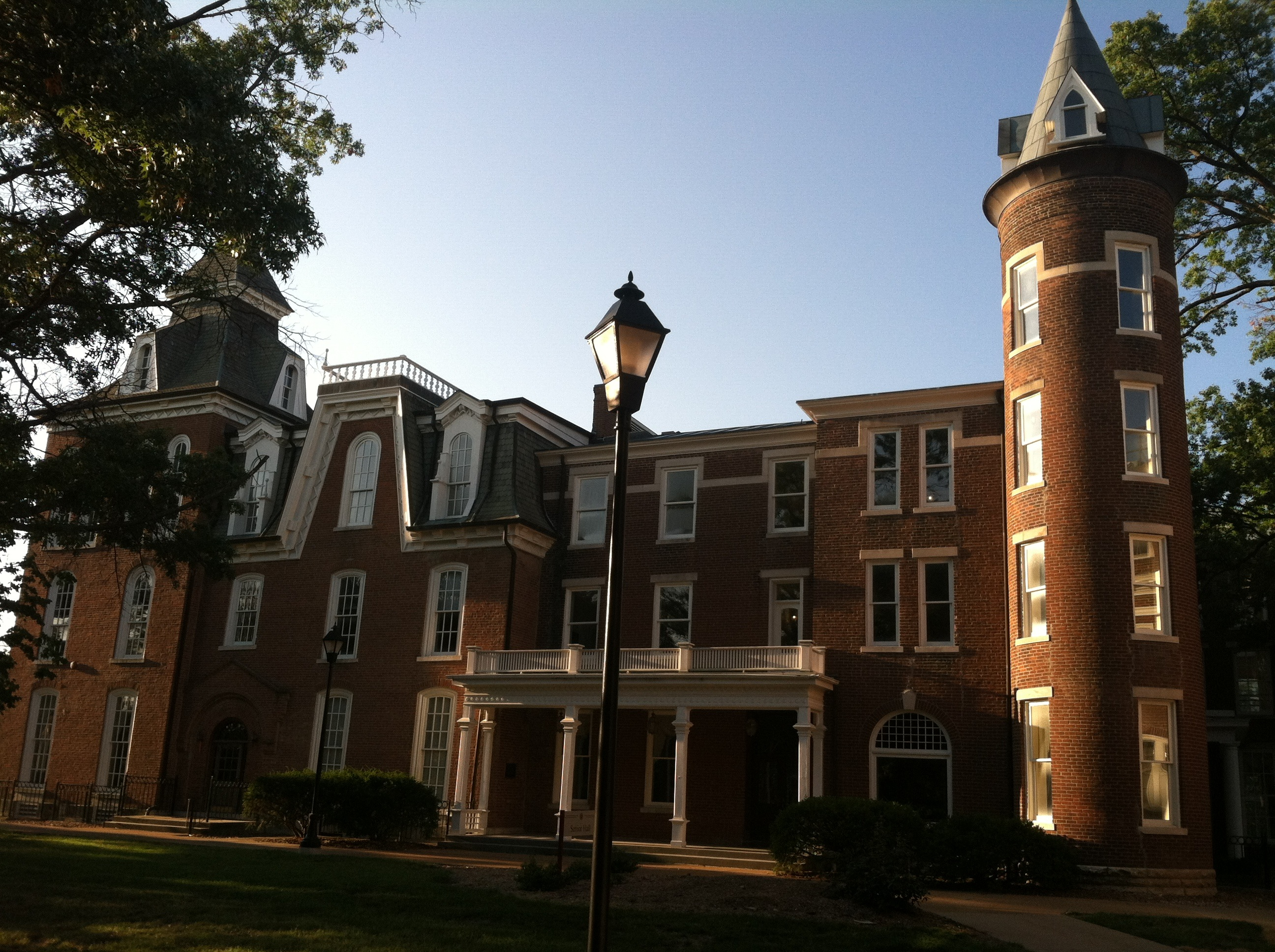
Senior Hall

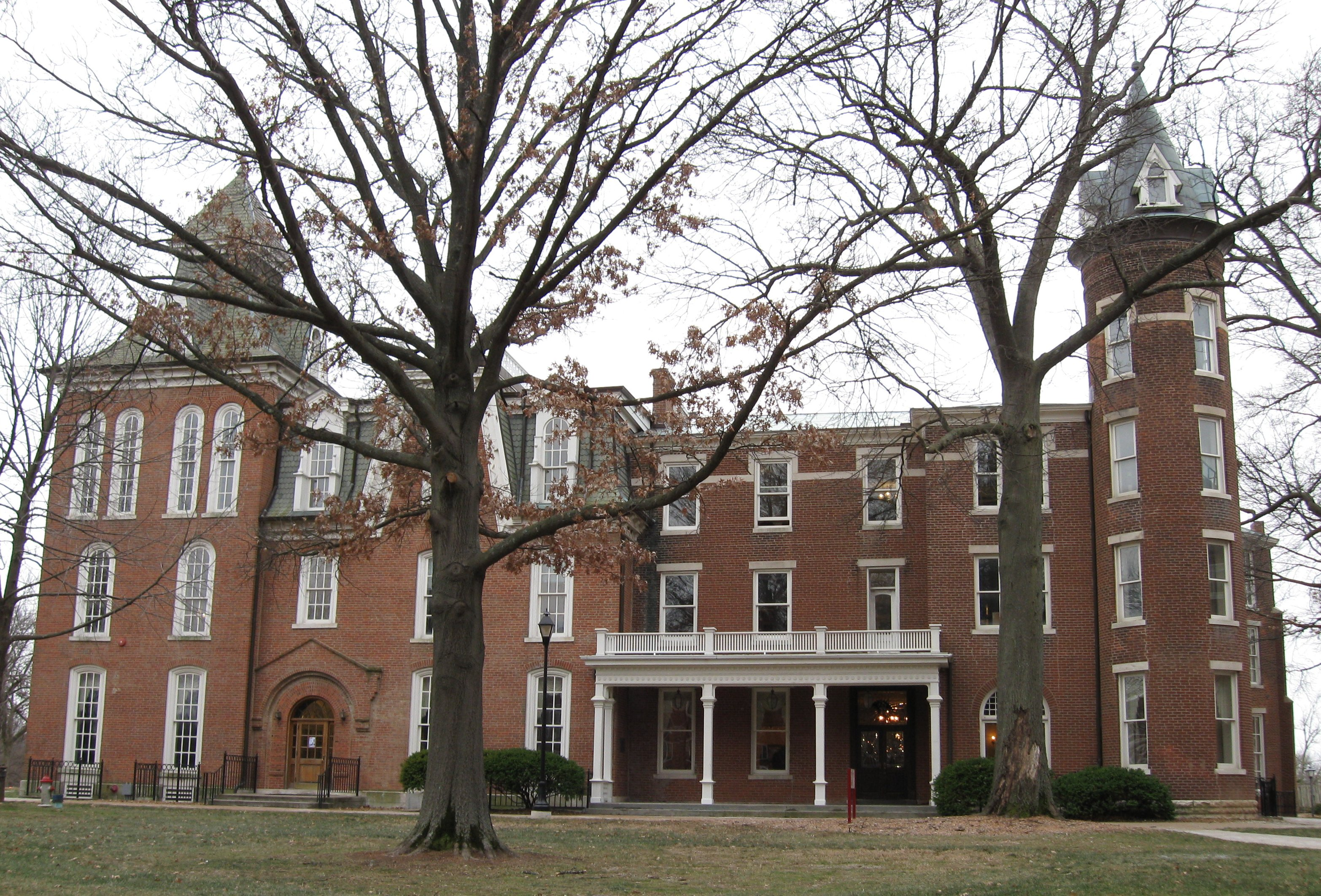
Senior Hall front

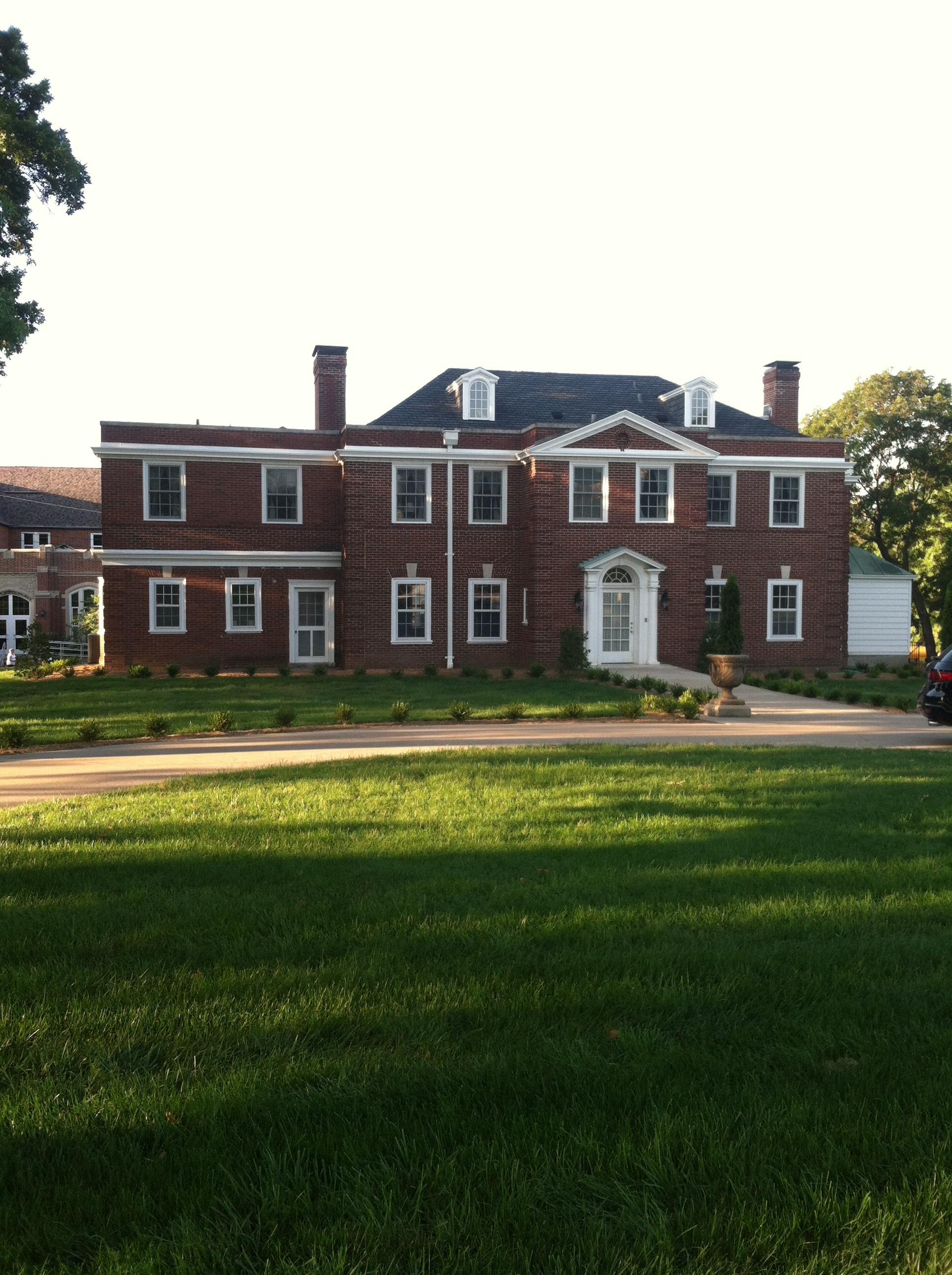
The president's home

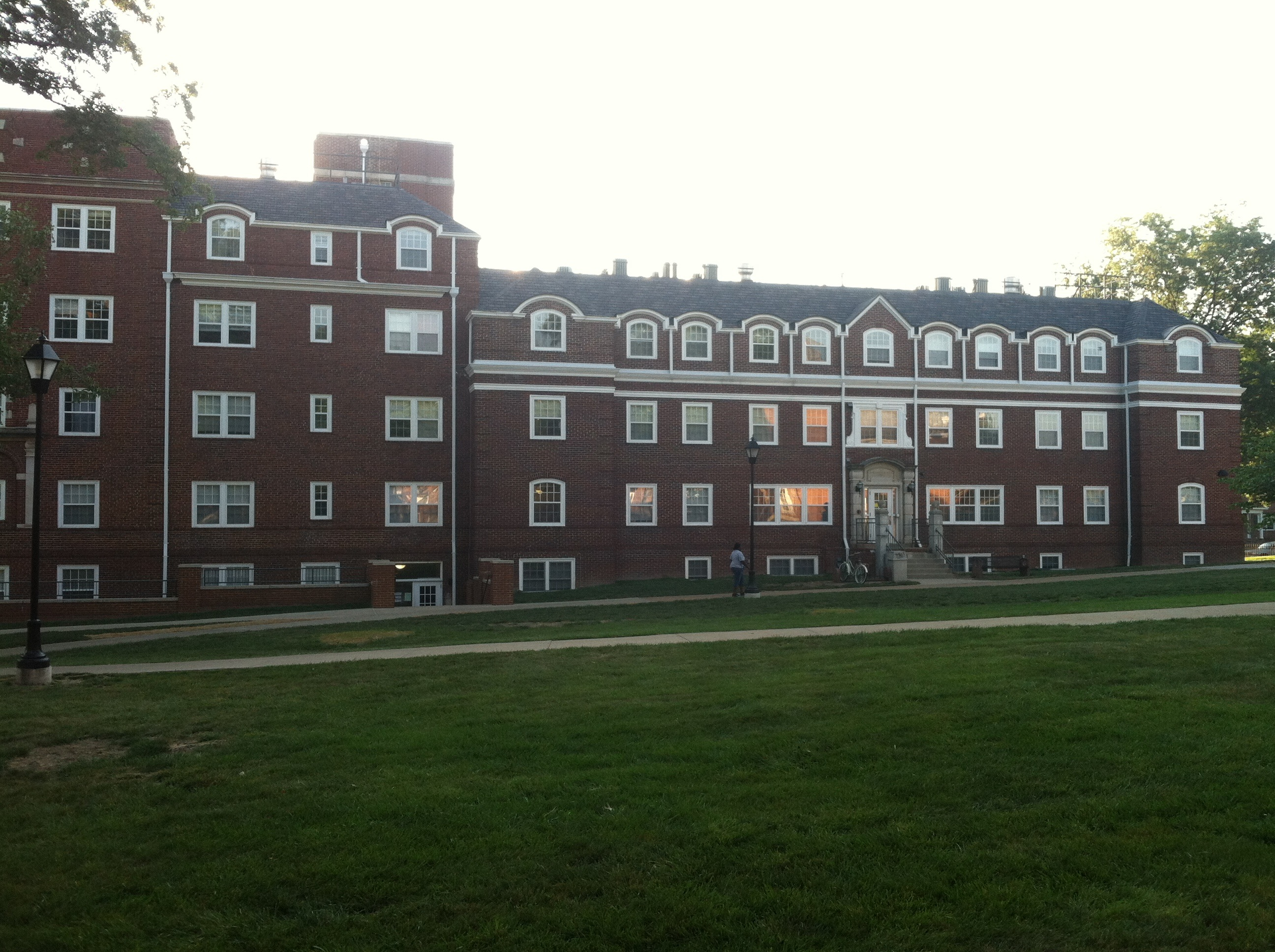
James Madison Woods Hall

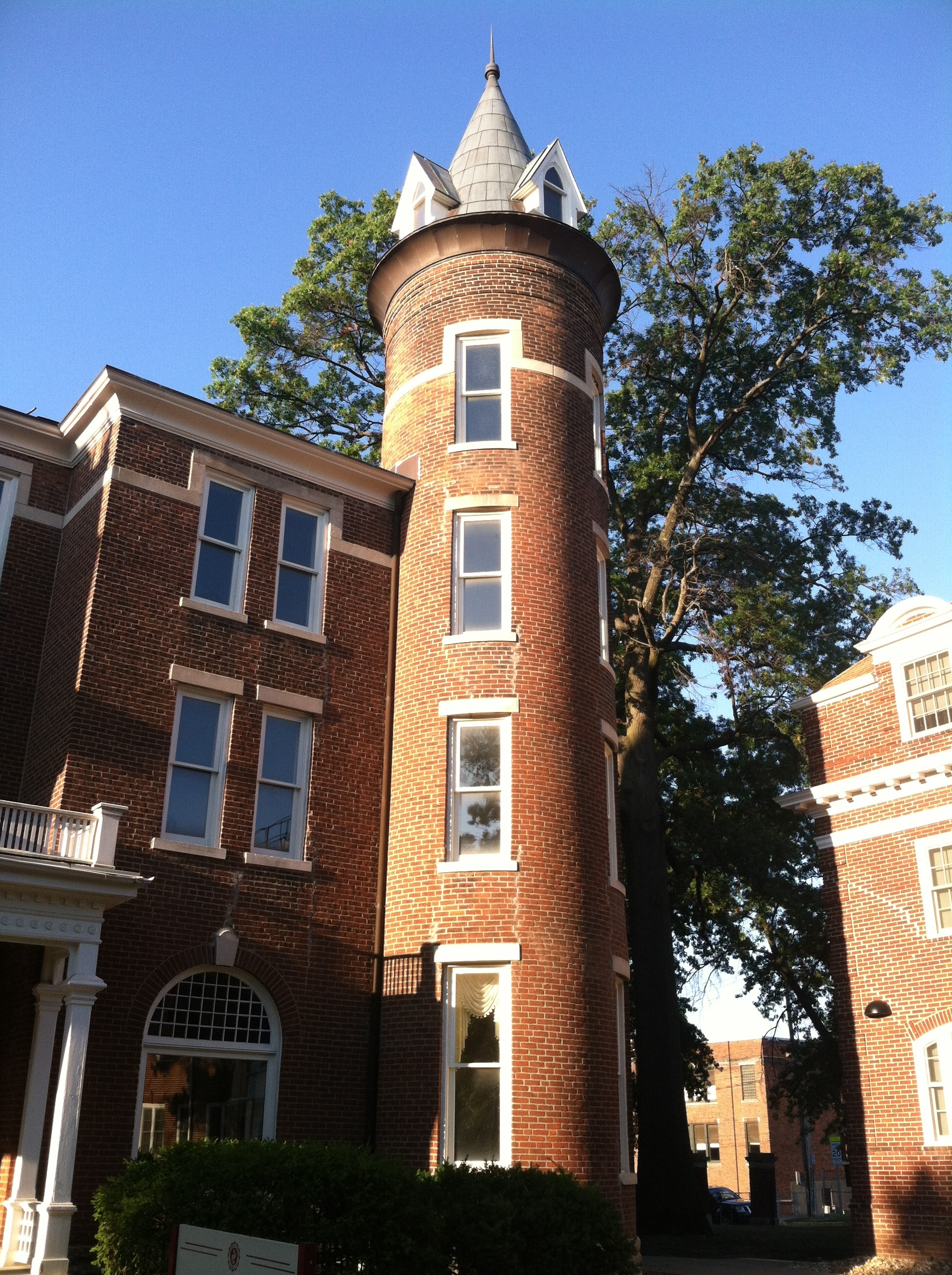
Senior Tower

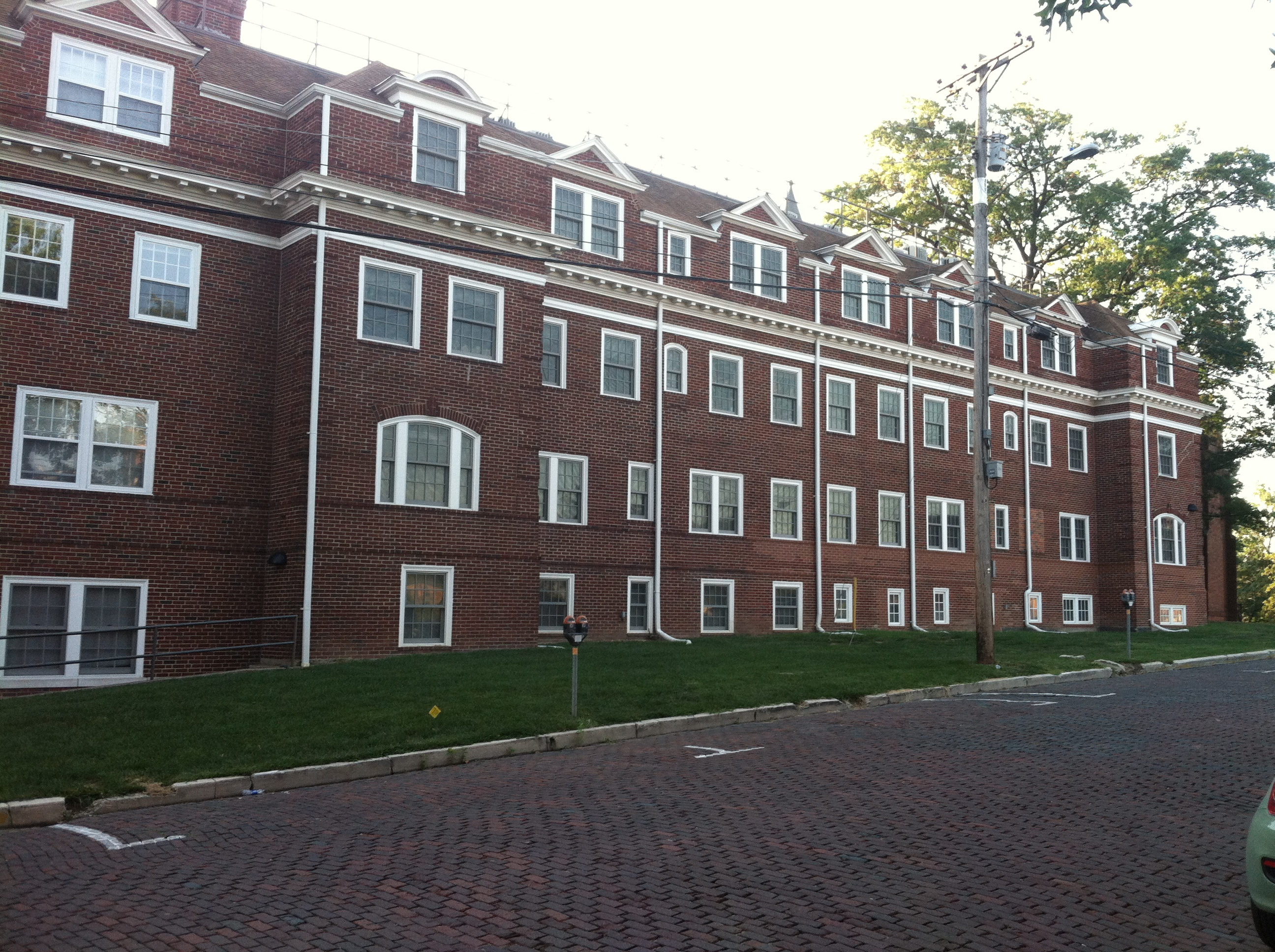
Columbia Hall
