= List of programs and colleges for non-traditional students =

The following are tertiary education institutions, or programs within parent institutions, that are specifically intended for non-traditional students in North America.

== Canada ==
- Athabasca University
- Thompson Rivers University
- Woodsworth College, University of Toronto
- York University
- Southern Alberta Institute of Technology

== United States ==
- Agnes Scott College
- Bard College
- Beloit College
- Boricua College
- Brown University
- Bryant & Stratton College
- Bryn Mawr College
- Charter Oak State College
- Columbia College (Missouri)
- Columbia University School of General Studies
- Connecticut College
- Empire State University, State University of New York
- Excelsior University
- Fordham University
- Grinnell College
- Hampshire College
- Harvard Extension School
- Jacksonville University
- Loyola University Chicago
- Mount Holyoke College
- New School of Public Engagement
- New York University
- Northeastern Illinois University
- Northeastern University
- Northwestern University
- Pitzer College
- Reed College
- Relay Graduate School of Education
- Simmons University
- Smith College
- Southern New Hampshire University
- Thomas Edison State University
- Texas State University
- Trinity College (Connecticut)
- Tufts University
- Union Institute & University
- University of Oklahoma
- University of Pennsylvania
- University of Washington
- Vassar College
- Washington University in St. Louis
- Wellesley College
- Western Governors University
- Williams College
- Wilmington University
- Yale College: Eli Whitney Students Program

== See also ==
- Continuing education
