= Frank Holder =

Frank Holder may refer to:

- Frank Holder (musician) (1925–2017), Guyanese jazz singer and percussionist
- Frank Holder (artist), American artist, sculptor, and choreographer
