= Dianne Lynch =

American academic administrator

24th President of Stephens College
- Incumbent
- Assumed office June 2, 2009
- Preceded by: Wendy B. Libby

Personal details
- Born: c. 1956
- Education: University of Wisconsin–Madison; McGill University

Dianne Lynch (born c. 1956) is an American academic administrator who served as the 24th president of Stephens College from 2009-2025. She was dean of the Roy H. Park School of Communications at Ithaca College from 2004 to 2009.

== Life ==
Lynch was born c. 1956. She studied feminist history in journalism, earning a master's degree from the University of Wisconsin–Madison in 1979. Lynch completed a Ph.D. in art history and communications at McGill University. Her dissertation focused on feminist theory and social identity development.

Lynch chaired the journalism department at Saint Michael's College. In 2004, she became dean of the Roy H. Park School of Communications at Ithaca College. On June 2, 2009, she became the 24th president of Stephens College, succeeding Wendy B. Libby. In May 2024, she announced her intent to retire in May 2025.
