= ArtCenter College of Design =

Art school in Pasadena, California, United States

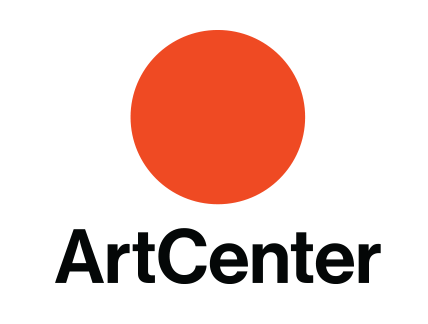
- Other names: ACCD; ArtCenter
- Type: Private
- Established: 1930; 96 years ago
- Founder: Edward A. "Tink" Adams
- Accreditation: WASC
- Academic affiliations: AICAD; NASAD
- Endowment: $151.6 million (2024)
- President: Karen Hofmann
- Faculty: 400 (Fall 2020)
- Administrative staff: 101 (Fall 2020)
- Students: 1,737 (Fall 2020)
- Undergraduates: 1,554 (Fall 2020)
- Postgraduates: 183 (Fall 2020)
- Doctoral students: unknown
- Location: 1700 Lida St, Pasadena, California, 91103, United States; 34°10′07″N 118°11′06″W
- Campus: Suburban, 165 acres (67 ha)
- Website: artcenter.edu
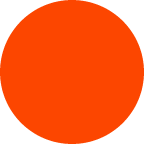

The ArtCenter College of Design is a private art college in Pasadena, California.

It was incorporated in 1930 as a degree-granting institution of higher learning in the US created specifically for students of both the visual arts and design. It offers Bachelor of Fine Arts, Bachelor of Science, Master of Fine Arts, Master of Arts, Master of Science, Doctor of Arts, and Doctor of Science degrees across multiple majors mostly relating to design.

== History ==
ArtCenter College of Design was founded in 1930 in downtown Los Angeles as the ArtCenter School. In 1935, Fred R. Archer founded the photography department, and Ansel Adams was a guest instructor in the late 1930s. During and after World War II, ArtCenter ran a technical illustration program in conjunction with the California Institute of Technology.

In 1947, the post-war boom in students caused the school to expand to a larger location in the building of the former Cumnock School for Girls in the Hancock Park neighborhood, while still maintaining a presence at its original downtown location. The school began granting Bachelor's and Master's degrees in arts in 1949, and was fully accredited by the Western Association of Schools and Colleges in 1955.

In 1965, the school changed its name to Art Center College of Design. The school expanded its programs, including a film program in 1973. The school moved to the Hillside Campus in Pasadena in 1976. The school operated ArtCenter Europe in Vevey, Switzerland from 1986 to 1996. In 2003, ArtCenter was granted Non-governmental organization status by the UN Department of Public Information.

ArtCenter opened the South Campus in Pasadena in 2004. In 2019, ArtCenter revealed they exceeded their $100 million goal when their fundraising campaign for additional scholarships and expanding their south campus started in 2011. The school raised $124 million from more than 7,000 contributions. ArtCenter celebrated their 90th anniversary on April 16, 2020. The planned celebration was rescheduled due to the coronavirus pandemic.

== Academics ==
ArtCenter offers undergraduate and graduate programs in a wide variety of art and design fields, as well as public programs for children and high school students, and continuing studies for adults in the Los Angeles metro area. It is one of the few schools to offer a degree in Interaction Design. The two campuses in Pasadena are considered architecturally notable. ArtCenter built its reputation as a vocational school, preparing returning G.I.s for work in the commercial arts fields and began awarding degrees in 1949. In recognition of Art Center's commitment to addressing social and humanitarian issues through design, 2003 saw ArtCenter become the first design college to ever receive NGO (non-governmental organization) status by the United Nations.

The college logo is an orange circle, also known as the ArtCenter "Dot," which has been a part of the school's identity since its inception by founder Tink Adams and a small number of colleagues. ArtCenter is accredited by the Western Association of Schools and Colleges and the National Association of Schools of Art and Design.

=== Rankings ===
While art and design schools are not regularly included in typical undergraduate rankings such as U.S. News & World Report, ArtCenter has been recognized by a number of national and industry publications. The college's undergraduate and graduate industrial design programs are consistently ranked number one by DesignIntelligence. U.S. News & World Report also ranks Art Center's Art, Industrial Design and Media Design Practices programs among the top 20 graduate schools in the U.S. Most recently, the growing influence of Art Center's Film programs resulted in the college's ranking among The Hollywood Reporter's list of the Top 25 Global Film Schools.

In 2014, Money magazine ranked Art Center third on its list of 25 of the best college values and in 2013, Coroflot's 2013 Creative Employment Snapshot respondents showed Art Center alumni earning more compared to peer institutions. In 2021, ArtCenter was ranked number ten globally according to the QS World University Rankings by the subject Art and Design.

== Facilities ==
ArtCenter College of Design has two campuses in Pasadena: Hillside Campus and South Campus.

=== Hillside Campus ===
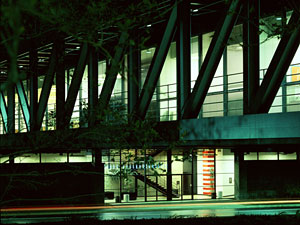
ArtCenter's Hillside Campus at night, September 2005

Designed by modernist architect Craig Ellwood, the Hillside Campus broke ground in November 1974. The "bridge building" spanned an arroyo and roadway on 175 acres (71 ha) in the hills above Pasadena. Opening in 1976, the building was later expanded with the south wing, designed by former Ellwood associate James Tyler, and constructed between 1989 and 1991. The Hillside Campus houses classrooms and studio space, multiple computer labs, the James Lemont Fogg Memorial Library, a model shop with traditional tools as well as rapid prototyping technologies (multi-axis CNC, laser-cutting, and multiple types of 3D printing), painting facilities, the Color, Material, and Trends Exploration Lab (CMTEL), an (Auto) Interior Simulation Lab, the Sinclaire Pavilion, photo and film stages with printing and editing facilities, and both a curated student gallery and an external exhibit gallery, both open to the public. The Hillside Campus has been designated as a historic monument by the City of Pasadena.

=== South Campus ===
The South Campus opened in 2004 in a former aircraft-testing facility built during World War II. Renovated by the Santa Monica-based firm Daly Genik, it houses the graduate Art and the Media Design Practices programs and studios, exhibition space for both of those programs, a print shop, a letterpress studio, and public programs including the ArtCenter at Night, ArtCenter for Kids, and the Design-Based Learning Lab. There is an 16,000-square-foot (1,500 m^{2}) exhibition space known as the Wind Tunnel, which is currently the home of the Media Design Practices program. The Wind Tunnel has hosted events including the biannual ArtCenter Design Conference like 2006's "Radical Craft" and 2008's "Serious Play"; an annual Summit on Sustainable Mobility, large exhibitions such as "Supersonic: 1 Wind Tunnel, 8 Schools, 120 Artists"; "Gardenlab", and "Open House: Architecture and Technology for Intelligent Living" (with Vitra Design Museum), and various community meetings and events.

In 2012, ArtCenter announced the expansion of South Campus with the acquisition of a former U.S. Postal Service property adjacent to the existing campus, made entirely possible through the college's philanthropic efforts. At that time, the college appointed Michael Maltzan Architecture as its partner in planning academic spaces and expansion of its educational resources. With this agreement still intact, actual renovation of the former USPS building was completed by Darin Johnstone Architecture in 2014. Also in 2014, ArtCenter announced the acquisition of an office building at the "gateway" to Pasadena and future plans for new student housing, all of which will elevate South Campus from a "satellite" location to equal programs and activities found at the Hillside Campus.

In 2014, ArtCenter announced a $2 million gift to establish the Hoffmitz Milken Center for Typography "to advance the research, teaching and understanding of letterform design." The center is named after 20-year Art Center typography teacher Leah Hoffmitz Milken and the establishing gift was made by the Lowell Milken Family Foundation.

== Student outcomes ==
College Scorecard estimated that the median salary in 2020 and 2021 for graduates who matriculated in 2010 and 2011 was $70,700 with 68% making more than high school graduates. Center on Education and the Workforce estimates the return on investment 10 years after graduation with a bachelor's degree from the college is $5,000; however, this metric appreciates to $1,010,000 40 years after graduation.

== See also ==
- Design engineer
- List of colleges and universities in California
- List of digital art software
