= Warehouse (disambiguation) =

A warehouse is a storage facility.

Warehouse or The Warehouse may also refer to:

== Buildings and places ==
=== Canada ===
- The Warehouse (Toronto), a defunct nightclub in Toronto, Ontario
- The Warehouse Studio, a recording facility and photography studio in Vancouver, British Columbia

=== France ===
- Warehouse (Nantes), a cultural club based in Nantes, specialised in electronic music.

=== United Kingdom ===
- Warehouse, Langport, a structure in Langport, Somerset
- The Warehouse (Preston, Lancashire), a nightclub and music venue

=== United States ===
- Warehouse (nightclub), a defunct club, credited as the origin of the term "house music", in Chicago, Illinois
- Warehouse District (Raleigh, North Carolina), a business district in Raleigh, North Carolina
- The Warehouse (New Orleans), a defunct rock-music venue in New Orleans, Louisiana
- The Warehouse (Syracuse), a building in Syracuse, New York

== Companies ==
- Warehouse (clothing), a British women's clothing retail chain
- The Warehouse Group, a New Zealand retailer

== Entertainment ==
- "Warehouse" (song), a 1994 song by Dave Matthews Band
- Warehouse: Songs and Stories, a 1987 album by Hüsker Dü
- "Warehouse" (Beavis and Butt-Head), a 2023 television episode
- The Warehouse, a 2019 novel by Rob Hart

== See also ==
- List of warehouse districts
- Warehouse Theatre (disambiguation)
- Wherehouse, a warehouse formerly used as a rehearsal space and studio by the band Aerosmith, in Waltham, Massachusetts, US
- Wherehouse Entertainment, a defunct American music retailer
