= Stephens College South Campus Historic District =

Historic district in Missouri, United States

- U.S. National Register of Historic Places
- U.S. Historic district
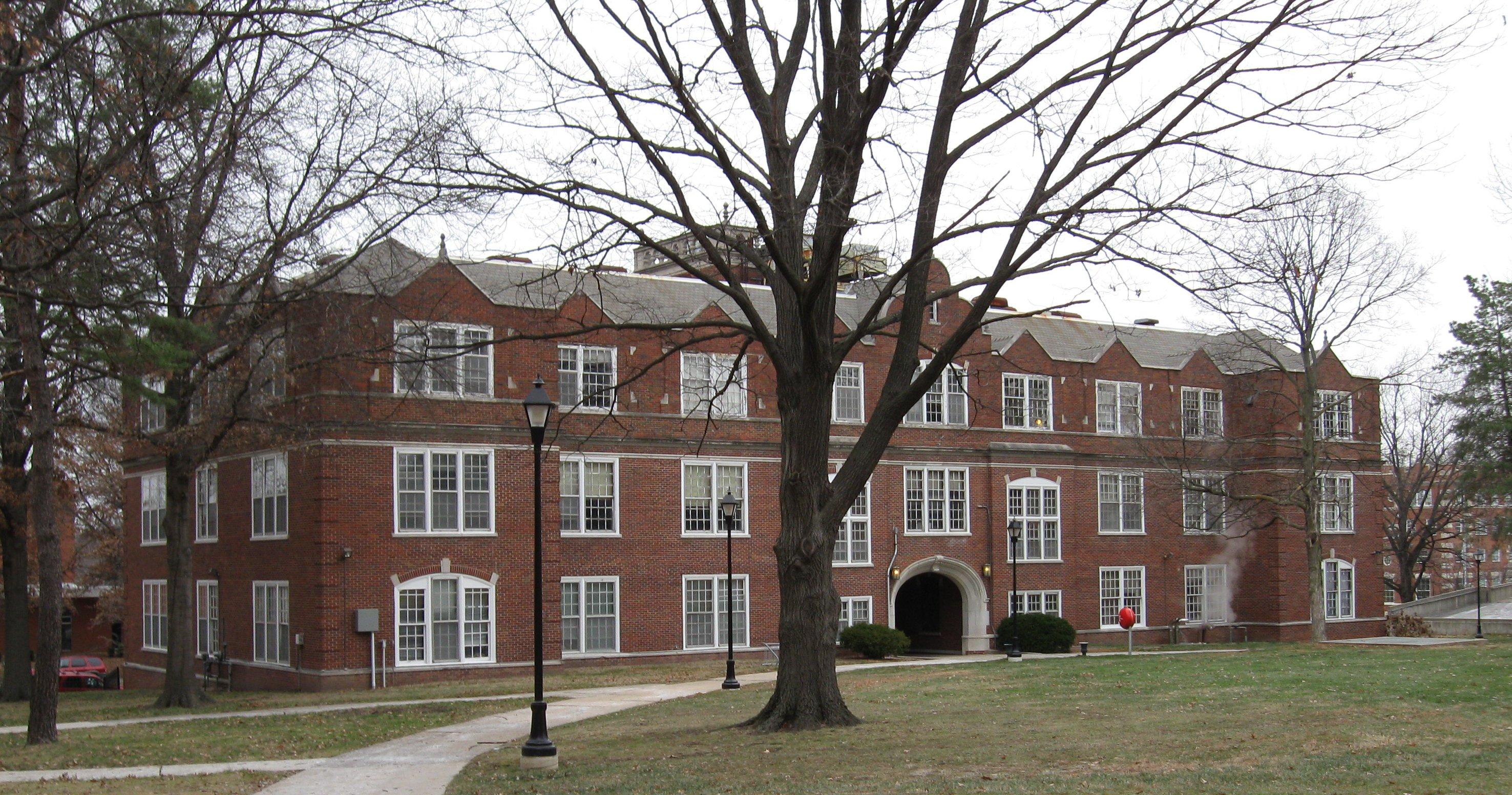
- Hickman Hall

- Location within Missouri Location within the United States
- Location: 1200 E. Broadway, Columbia, Missouri
- Coordinates: 38°57′3″N 92°19′22″W
- Area: 7 acres (2.8 ha)
- Built by: Davis and Phillips Construction
- Architect: Jamieson, J.P.
- Architectural style: Colonial Revival
- NRHP reference No.: 05001326
- Added to NRHP: November 25, 2005

The Stephens College South Campus Historic District is a national historic district on the campus of Stephens College in Columbia, Missouri. It includes the historic core of Stephens College in Eastern Downtown Columbia, Missouri. The District includes Senior Hall, Hickman Hall, Columbia Hall, and Wood Hall.

The district was added to the National Register of Historic Places in 2005.

The South Quadrangle
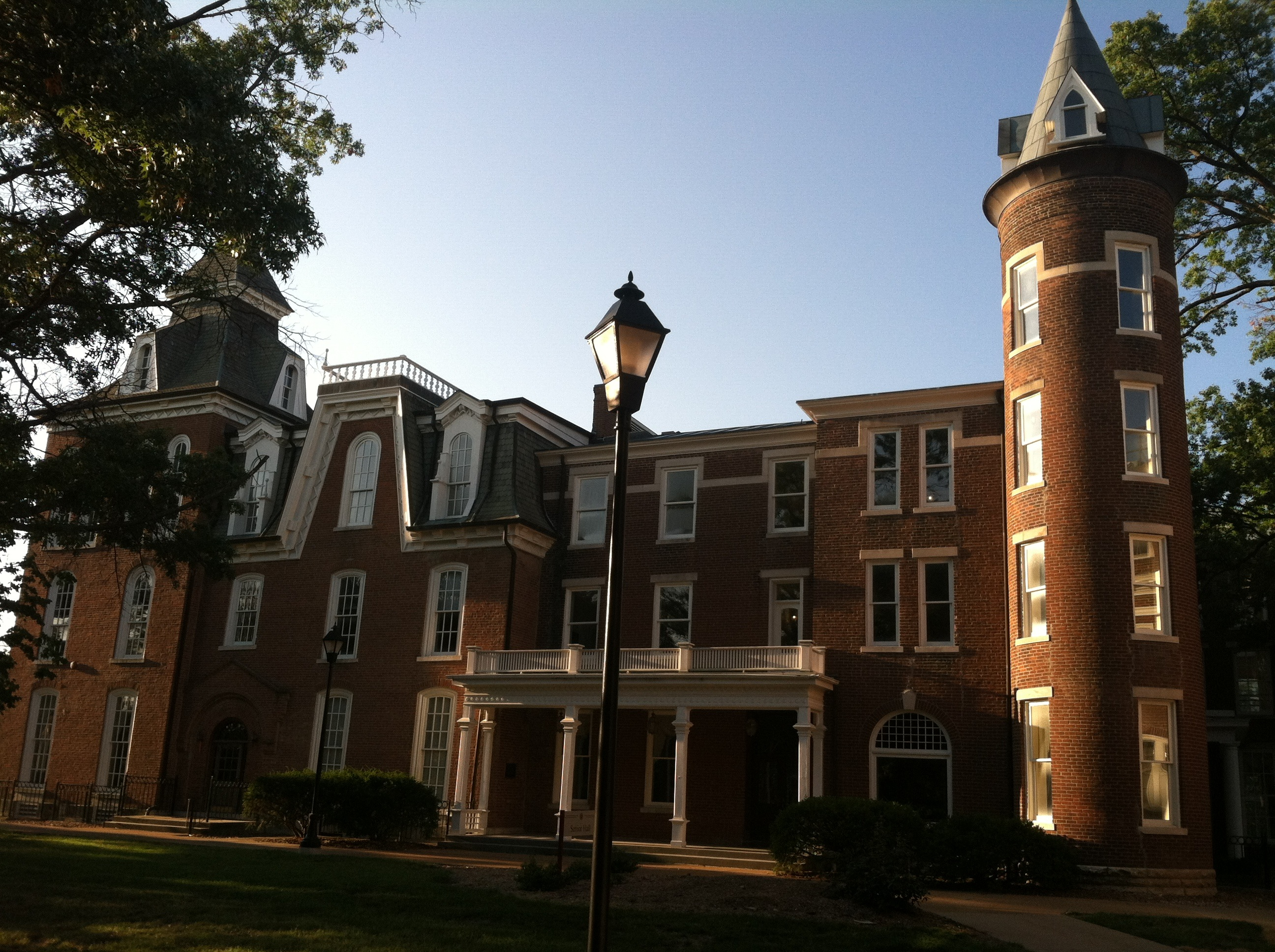
Senior Hall

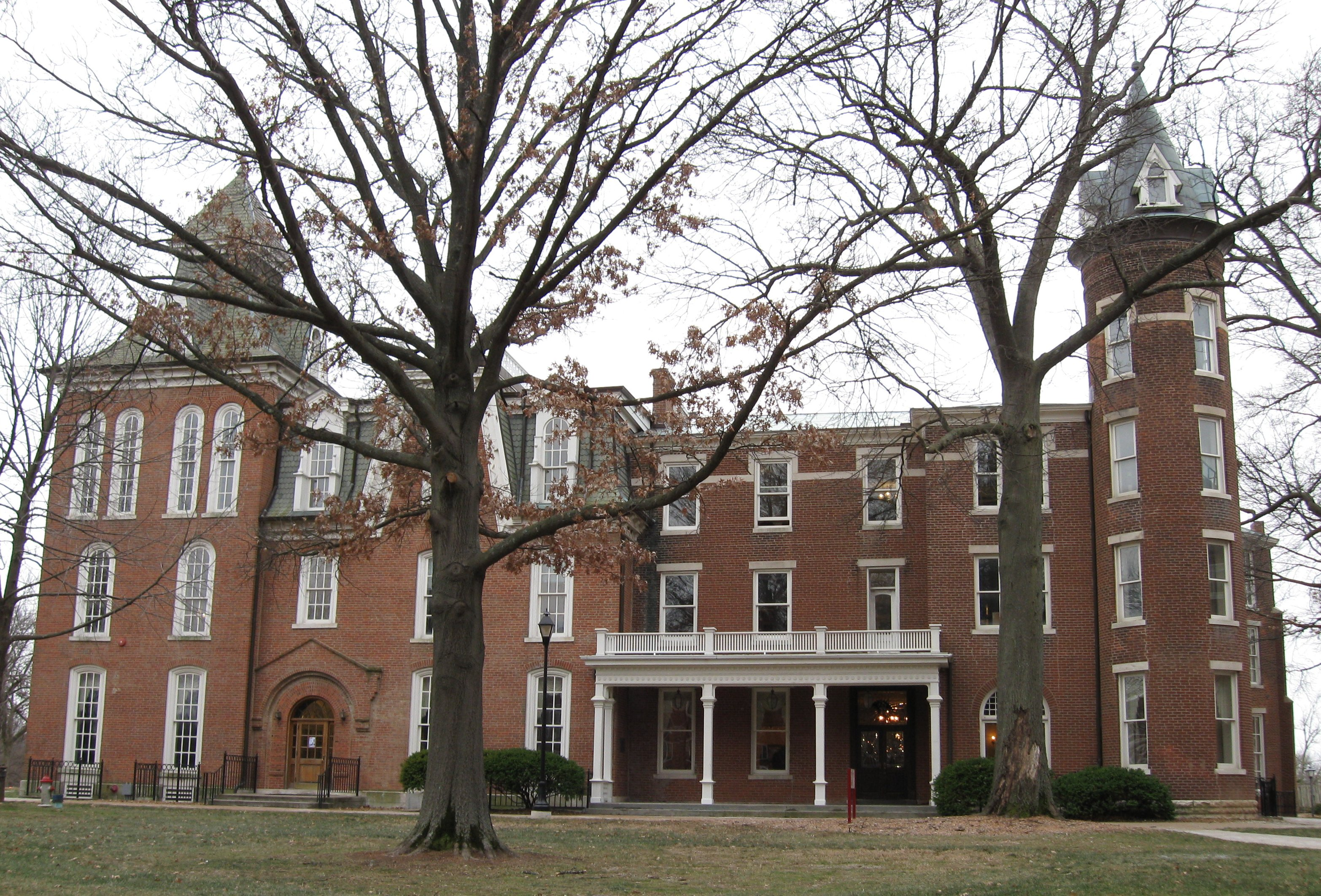
Senior Hall Front

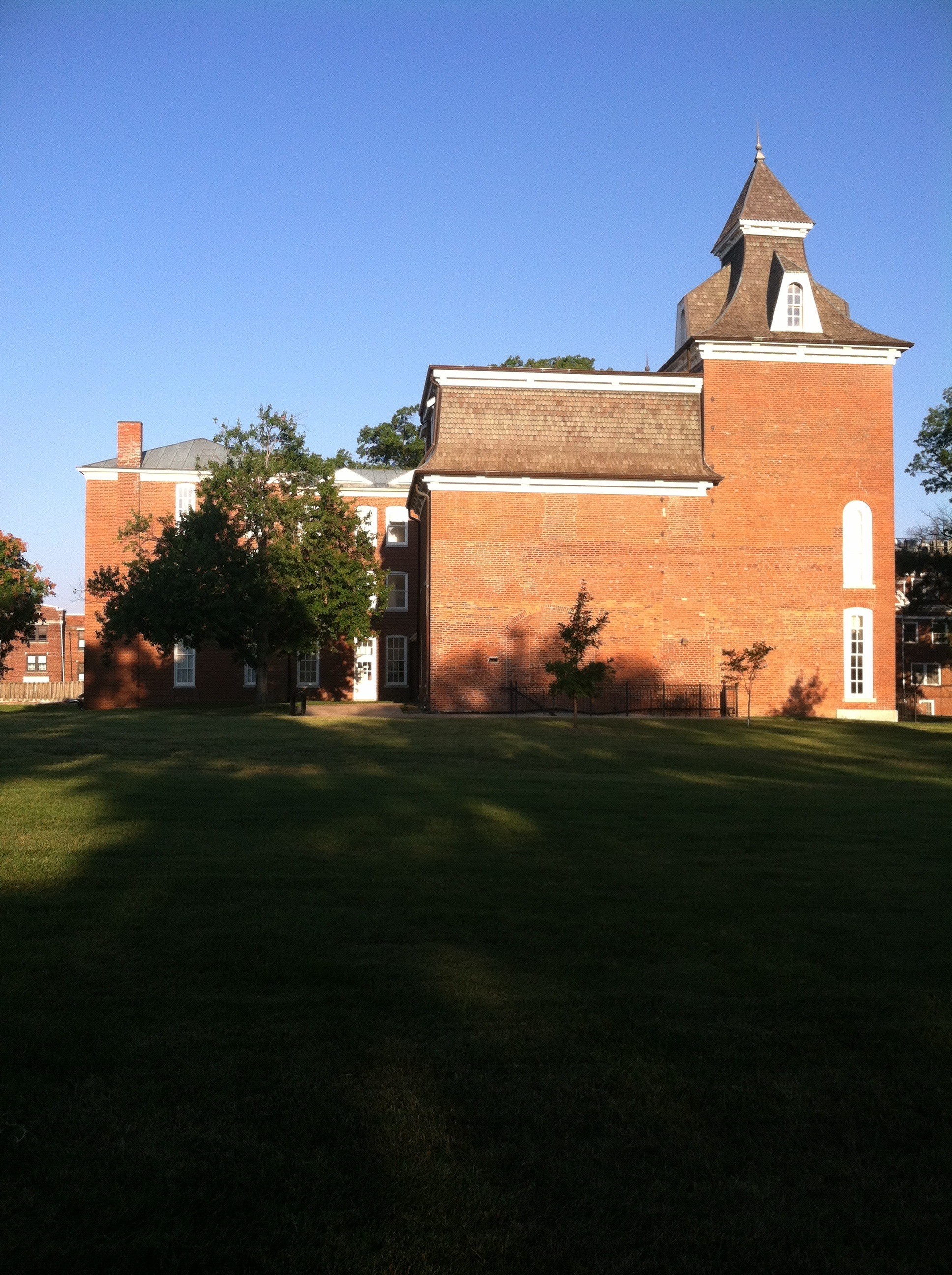
Senior Hall

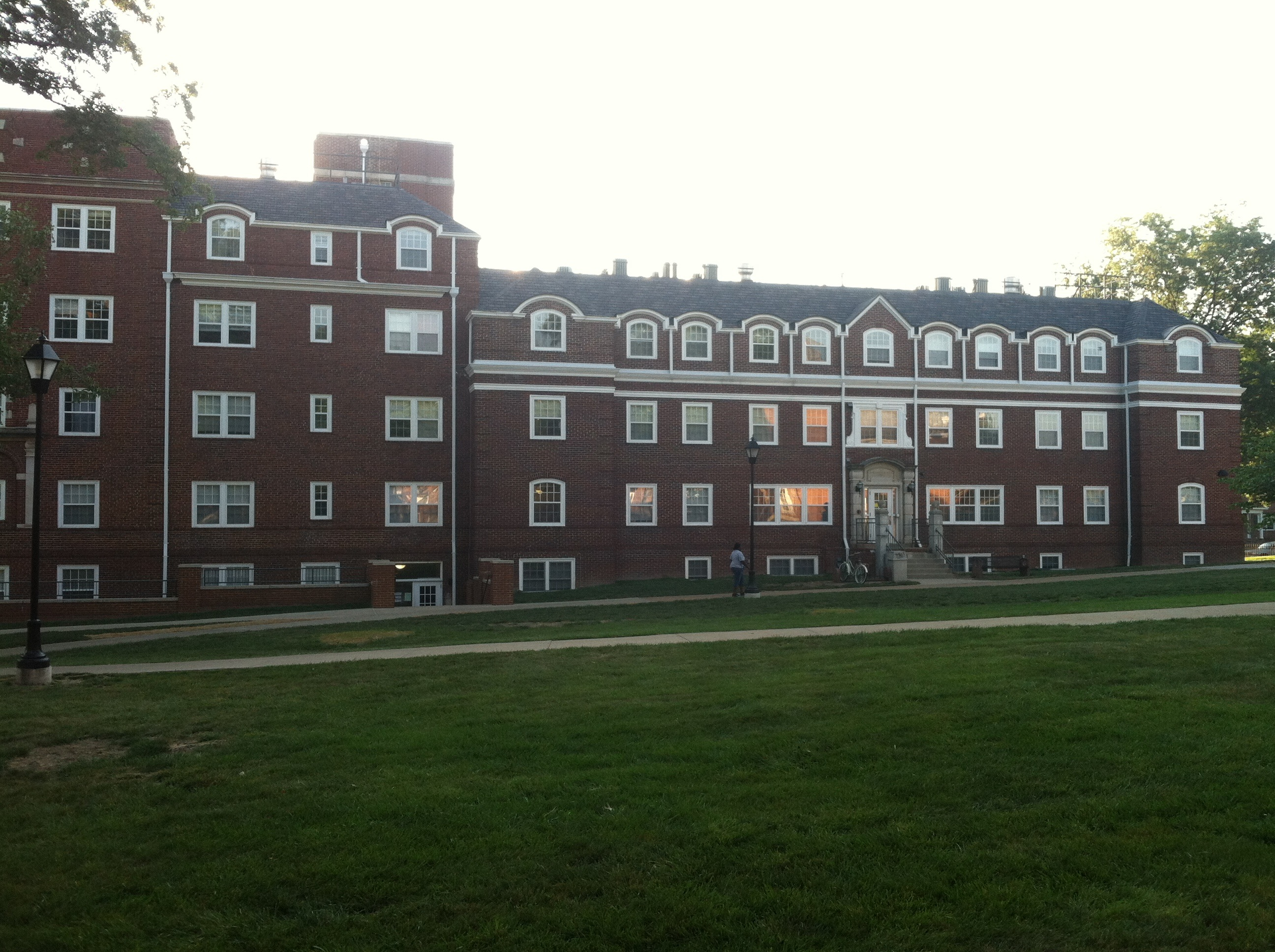
James Madison Wood Hall

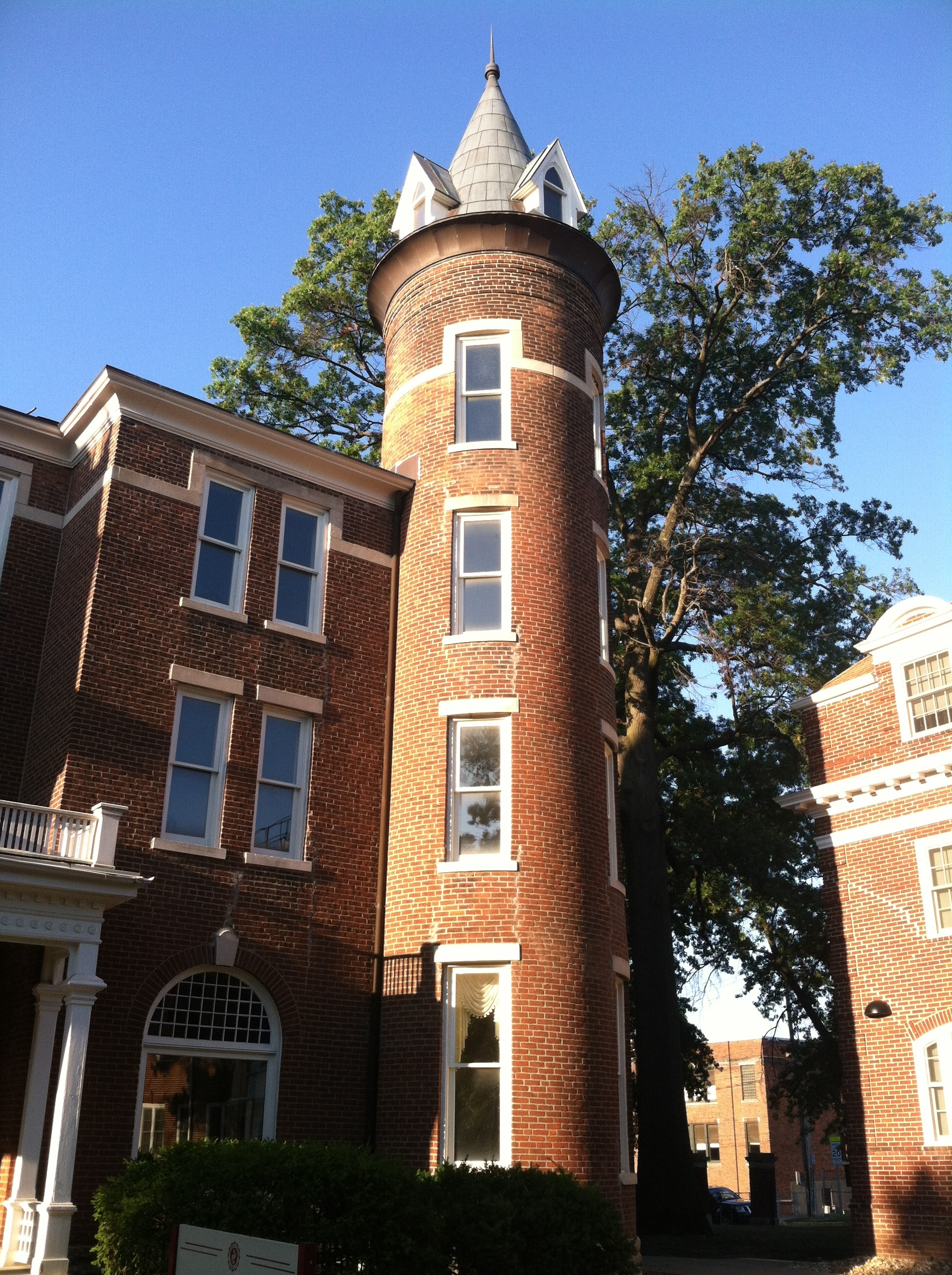
Senior Tower

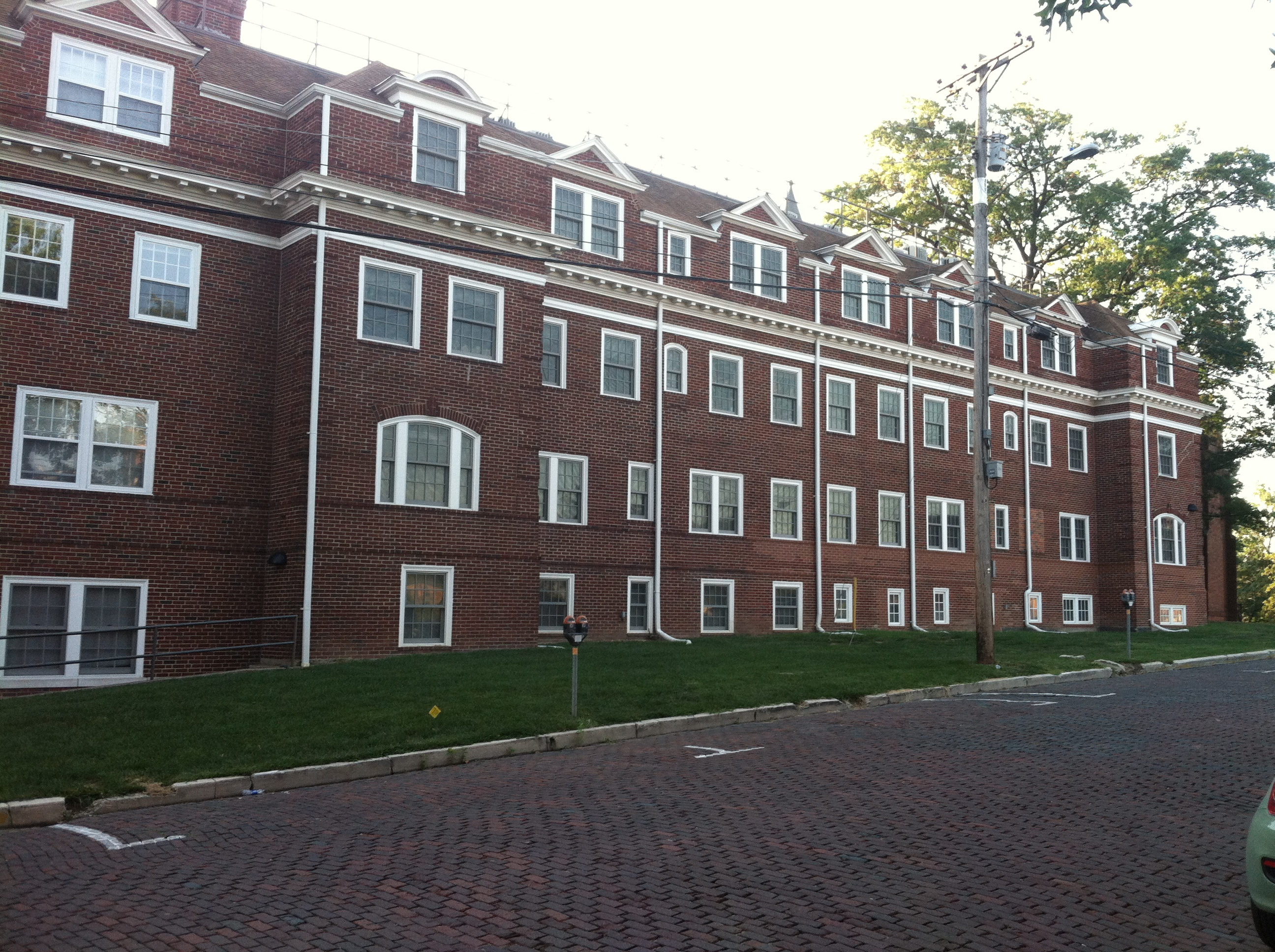
Columbia Hall
