= Frank Holder (artist) =

- Born: Greensboro, NC, Greensboro
- Education: Studied at University of North Carolina at Greensboro
- Known for: Painting, sculpture, choreography
- Website: www.frankholderart.com

Frank Holder is an American artist, sculptor, and choreographer currently living and working in Greensboro, North Carolina.

== Education and early career ==
Frank Holder received his BFA in dance from Stephens College, and then earned his MFA in dance from the University of North Carolina at Greensboro in 1973. He founded the Greensboro-based Frank Holder Dance Company in 1973, and served as its artistic director and choreographer for 12 years. Back then, he described the company as the "only major modern-dance company in the South". Holder also choreographed work for the Ballet Isleno de Folklorico of Puerto Rico and the Madison University Dance Company, and was a solo performer for the Rod Rogers Dance Company in New York. He was part of Lincoln Center's Artist in Education program for the visual arts in 1978 and taught dance and video art at the North Carolina Governor's School in Laurinburg.

== Sculptural work ==
In 1995, Frank Holder transitioned his artistic focus from dance to sculpture. Holder's experience as a dancer and choreographer has influenced his sculpture, which tends to have a flowing, organic quality. With dancing, Holder said, "I was always shaping two or three bodies through movement. That's sculpture in itself. There's a sense of motion there." Holder's works are dynamic, abstract sculptures with natural influences. His early sculptures were mostly in metal, including bronze, steel, aluminum, cooper, and brass. More recent works have incorporated natural elements such as stone, wood, wind, and water. Frank Holder showcased his work in both solo and group exhibitions.

== Awards and honors ==
Frank Holder has received a number of awards for his work from 1996 to 2014, some of these are:

- 2009 Merit Award, 21st Annual Sculpture in the Garden Exhibition, North Carolina Botanical Gardens, Chapel Hill,
- 2008 Selected to create a signature sculpture for the Mental Health Association of Greensboro
- 2005 Winner, North Carolina Outdoor Sculpture Exhibition
- 2002 Finalist, 2nd Annual Florida Outdoor Sculpture Exhibition, Polk Museum of Art, Lakeland, FL

== Public collections ==
Holder's work has been featured in a number of public collections, these include:

- Center for Creative Leadership, Greensboro NC
- City of Lakeland, FL
- North Carolina Botanical Garden at the University of North Carolina at Chapel Hill
- University of North Carolina at Asheville
- Wake Forest University Baptist Medical Center, Winston-Salem, North Carolina

== Selected solo exhibitions ==
Holder also held solo exhibitions that include:

- 2011/2012 Artsource Fine Arts, Raleigh NC
- 2010 Park One Building, Winston-Salem, NC. Sponsored by Asolare Fine Arts

== Selected group exhibitions ==
Frank Holder also participated in over 50 other Small-Group and Group Exhibitions from 1996 to 2012. Selected examples include:

- 2010/2011/2012 Sculpture in the Garden North Carolina Botanical Garden, Chapel Hill
- 2000 Alchemy: A Five-Person Show, Greensboro Artists League, Greensboro, NC
- Florida Outdoor Sculpture Competition, Lakeland
- Somerhill Gallery, Durham, NC
- TriState Sculpture Show, Greensboro Arboretum
- Willow Walk Sculpture Show, Burlington NC
- Waterworks Visual Art Center, Salisbury NC
- World Plant Conference, NC Arboretum
