= Warehouse Theatre (disambiguation) =

Warehouse Theatre was a professional producing theatre in the centre of Croydon, England.

Warehouse Theatre may also refer to:

- Warehouse Theatre (Stephens) at Stephens College in Columbia, Missouri
- Warehouse Theatre (Washington, D.C), see Forum Theatre (Washington, D.C.)
- The Warehouse Theatre in Weymouth, England
- Former name of the Donmar Warehouse in London
