= Don Calloway =

American attorney and politician (born 1979)

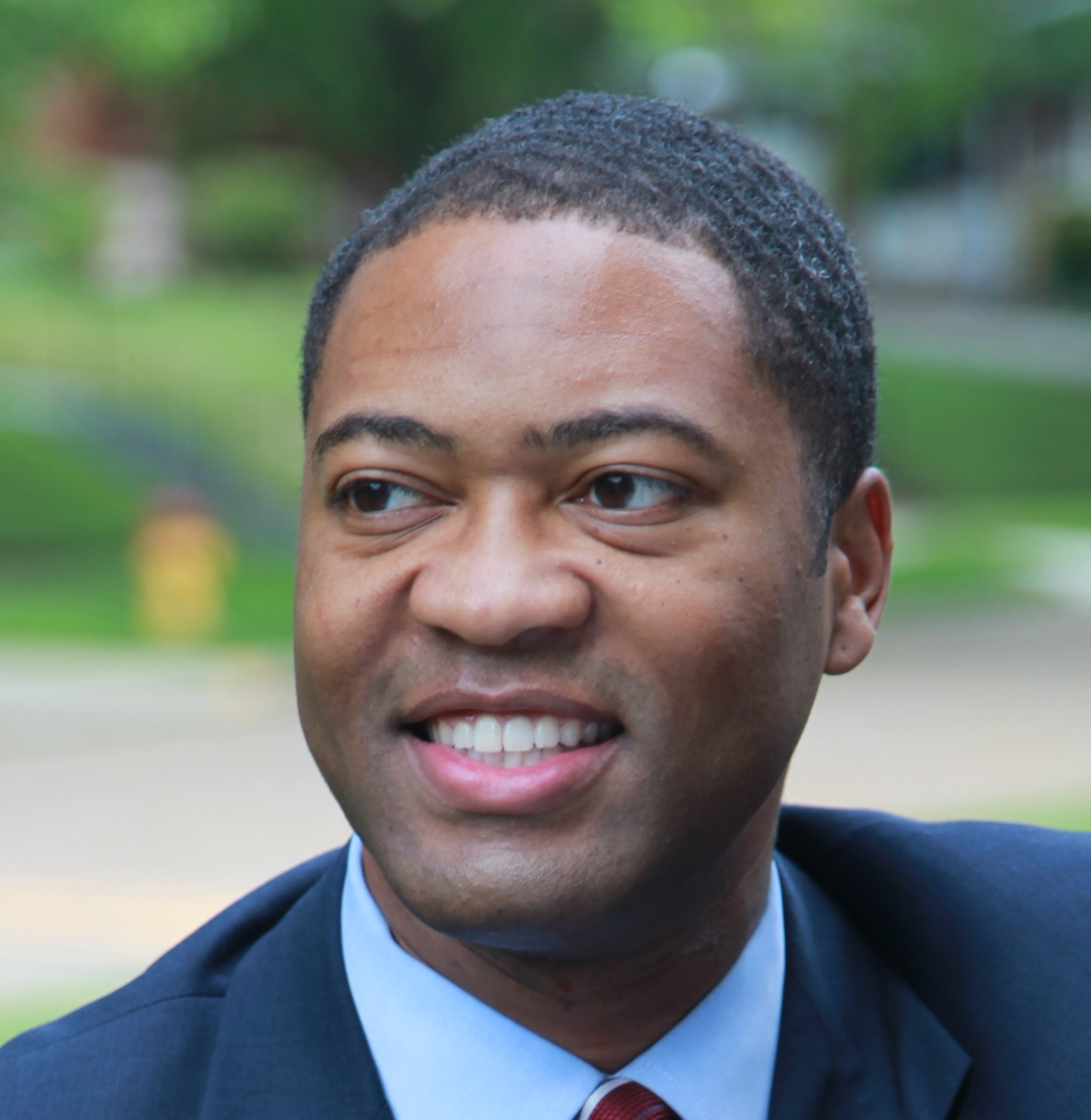

Member of the Missouri House of Representatives from the 71st district
- In office January 7, 2009 – January 5, 2011
- Preceded by: Esther Haywood
- Succeeded by: Clem Smith

Personal details
- Born: September 18, 1979 (age 47) St. Louis, Missouri
- Party: Democratic
- Education: Alabama A&M University; Boston University School of Law
- Occupation: Attorney

Donald Calloway Jr. (born September 18, 1979) is an American attorney and politician from St. Louis, Missouri. He was a Democratic member of the Missouri House of Representatives for the 71st District in St. Louis County.

== Early life ==
Donald Calloway Jr. was born in St. Louis, Missouri, to Donald Calloway Sr. and Jonell Calloway. In 2002, he graduated from Alabama A&M University, majoring in Political Science and English. There, he was initiated in the Gamma Phi chapter of Kappa Alpha Psi and was elected Student Body President. He then entered Boston University School of Law, graduating in 2005. They have two children together.

== 2008 election ==
On August 5, 2008, Calloway won the Democratic primary for the 71st District seat in the Missouri House of Representatives. Calloway won 52% of the vote in a three-way race against Vernon Harlan, and Rogerick Wilson. He was elected unopposed on November 4, 2008. He took office in January 2009.

== Representative career ==
Calloway, as a member of the Missouri House of Representatives, served on the Emerging Issues in Animal Agriculture Committee, General Laws Committee, Rules Committee and Tax Policy Committee.

In October 2009, the Northeast Ambulance and Fire Protection District Board, which had been plagued with charges of corruption, bribery and cronyism, came under direct fire as the board approved an ill-merited severance package for board members Robert Edwards and Joe Washington totaling over $750,000. Representative Calloway personally challenged the legitimacy of the payoff, and filed a successful lawsuit to have the corresponding bank accounts frozen.

In February 2010, Calloway sponsored a bill to limit the long-term effects of concussions on high-school football athletes. The bill required that student athletes who suffered a concussion get written permission from a doctor or licensed medical official, certifying the absence of long-term brain damage and the ability to continue playing safely, before they would be allowed to participate in games or practice. In August, Calloway lost his reelection bid during the primary.

== Advocacy ==
After his defeat in the primary, Calloway joined Anheuser-Busch where he handled legislative political affairs in 10 states in the Southeast. By 2014, he was working for them on the national level in Washington DC.

In 2016, he founded Pine Street Strategies, a lobbying firm in Washington DC. Through his firm, he continued to represent Anheuser-Busch and also lobbied on behalf of non-profits such as the Environmental Defense Fund, Campaign Zero and the NAACP. In 2018, he founded the National Voter Protection Action Fund, which works with state, city and county councils to promote voter protection policies
