= Clem Smith (politician) =

American politician

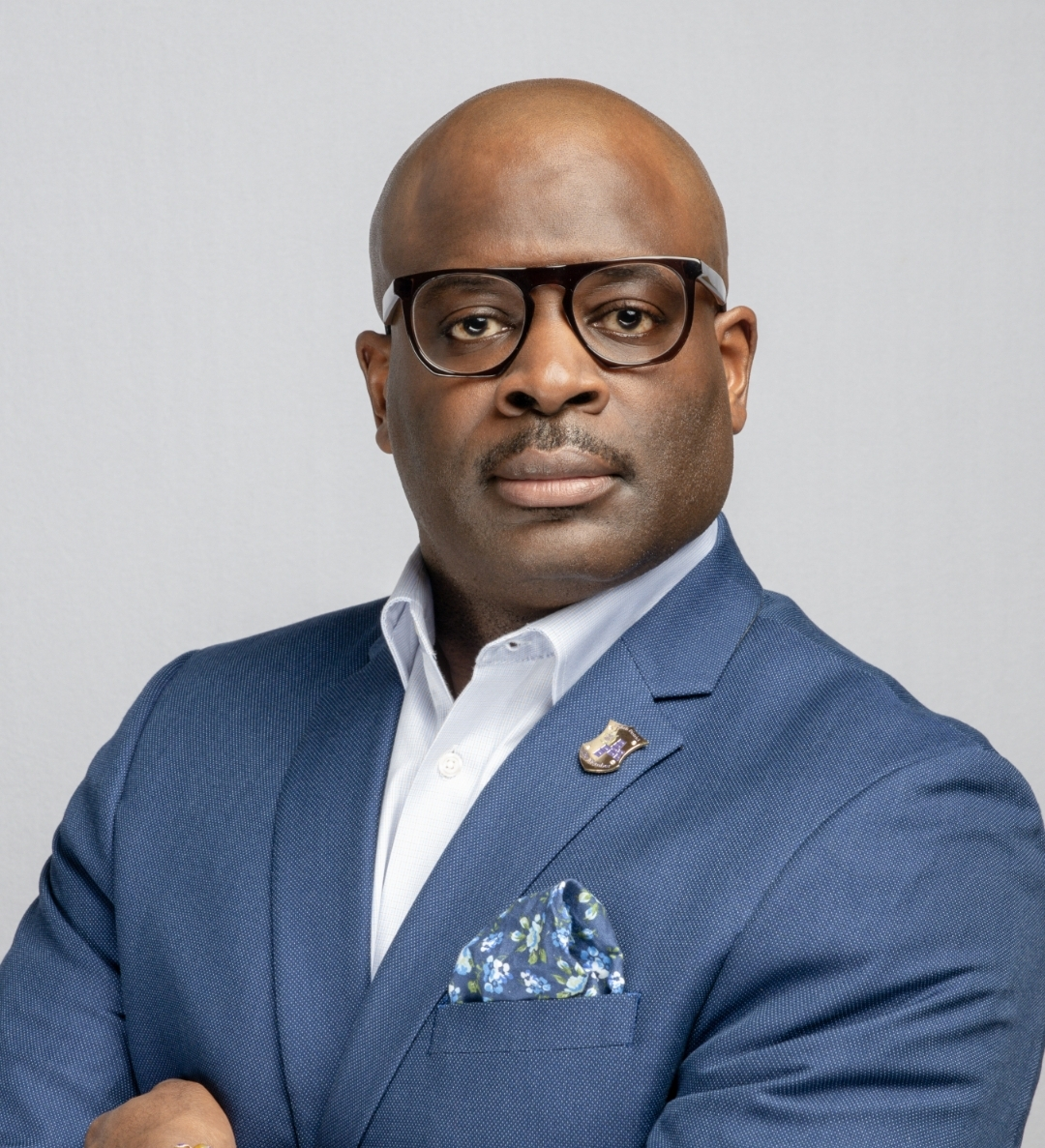
- Former Missouri State Representative Clem Smith

Chair of the Missouri Democratic Party
- Acting
- In office July 3, 2020 – December 12, 2020
- Preceded by: Jean Peters Baker
- Succeeded by: Michael Butler

Member of the Missouri House of Representatives from the 85th district
- In office January 5, 2011 – January 9, 2019
- Preceded by: Don Calloway
- Succeeded by: Kevin Windham Jr.

Personal details
- Born: April 13, 1977 (age 49) St. Louis, Missouri, U.S.
- Party: Democratic
- Education: Columbia College, Missouri (BA)

Clem Smith is an American politician. He was a member of the Missouri House of Representatives representing the 85th District in Saint Louis County from 2011 to 2019. He is a member of the Democratic Party.

Smith was Deputy Minority Whip, and a member of the Joint Committee on Tax Policy, Elections, Select Committee on Utilities (Ranking member), and the Select Committee on Labor and Industrial Relations (Ranking Member). Smith served on the executive committee of the National Black Caucus of State Legislators (NBCSL), and executive board of the National Labor Caucus of State Legislators (NLC).

In addition to his community and political work Smith works as a stationary engineer in the oil and gas industry, and is a member of the International Union of Operating Engineers Local 399, Upsilon Omega chapter of Omega Psi Phi fraternity, the Coalition of Black Trade Unionists, and Multiple Sclerosis Society. Smith was a Delegate to the Democratic National Conventions in 2012, 2016 and 2020.

A graduate of Clayton High School, Smith received his bachelor's degree from Columbia College of Missouri.

Party political offices
Preceded by Jean Peters Baker	Chair of the Missouri Democratic Party; Acting; 2020	Succeeded by Michael Butler
