= Kevin Windham Jr. =

American politician (born 1993)

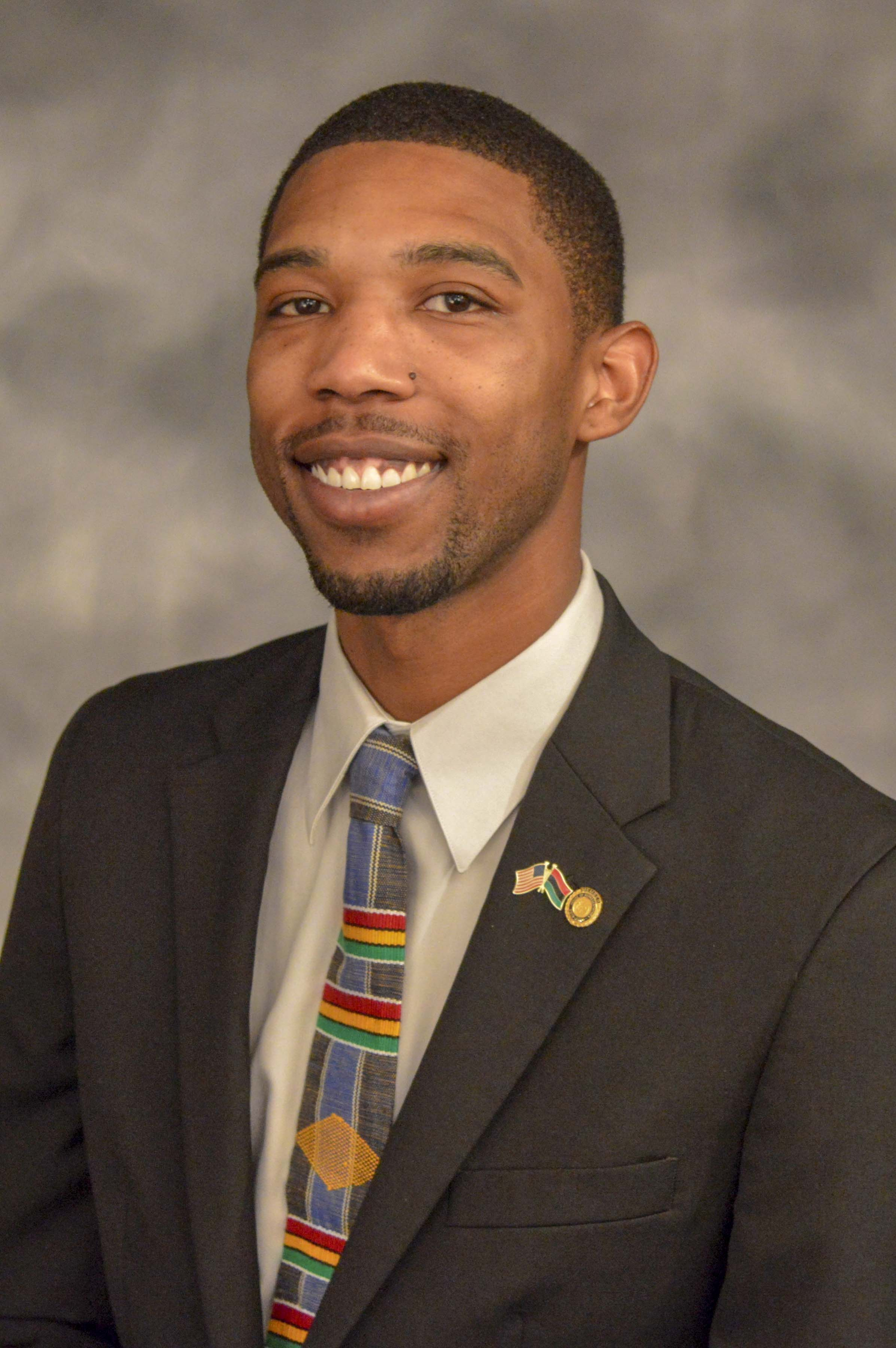

Member of the Missouri House of Representatives
- In office January 9, 2019 – January 8, 2025
- Preceded by: Clem Smith
- Succeeded by: Marla Smith
- Constituency: 74th district (2023–2025); 85th district (2019–2023)

Personal details
- Born: May 29, 1993 (age 33)
- Party: Democratic
- Education: Southeast Missouri State University

Kevin Lamar Windham Jr. (born May 29, 1993) is an American politician who was a Democratic member of the Missouri General Assembly, originally elected from the state's 85th House district, and after redistricting in 2022, elected from the 74th district.

== Personal ==
Windham Jr. plays basketball for leisure and attributes his passion for politics in large part to his late great-grandmother, Rose Simon.

== Education ==
Windham Jr. graduated from Southeast Missouri State University. During college Windham served as a member of Student Government Association, Black Student Union, and the President’s Task Force on Diversity Education.

Windham Jr. has participated in the FOCUS St. Louis Impact Fellows program and University of Missouri Extension’s Neighborhood Leadership Fellows program.

== Political career ==
=== Early career ===
Prior to his legislative duties, Windham served the state of Missouri as a staffer in the offices of Missouri State Senator Maria Chappelle-Nadal and United States Senator Claire McCaskill.

=== State representative ===
On August 7, 2018 Windham Jr. won the four-way Democratic primary for Missouri House of Representatives in District 85 to succeed Clem Smith with 43.7% of the vote. Windham Jr. won the general election on November 6, 2018, securing 82.4% of the vote. As an incoming legislator, Windham was elected vice-chair of the Missouri House Democratic Caucus for the 100th General Assembly.

Windham ran uncontested in the 2020 election for Missouri House of Representatives in District 85.

Windham stood down at the 2024 Missouri House of Representatives election to take up a position at Washington University.

=== State committeeman ===
In addition to his duties as state representative, Windham was elected to serve as State Committeeman of the 14th Senate District within the Missouri Democratic Party for the 2020-2022 term.

=== Electoral history ===
Missouri House of Representatives Primary Election, August 7, 2018, District 85
Party	Candidate	Votes	%	±%
Democratic	Kevin Windham, Jr.	3,073	43.69%	
Democratic	Errol Bush	2,538	36.08%	
Democratic	Eric Reese	999	14.20%	
Democratic	Jacob Walters	424	6.03%	
Total votes		7,034	100.00%	

Missouri House of Representatives Election, November 6, 2018, District 85
Party	Candidate	Votes	%	±%
Democratic	Kevin Windham, Jr.	10,457	82.44%	
Republican	Steven McKnight	2,228	17.56%	
Total votes		12,685	100.00%	

Missouri House of Representatives Election, November 3, 2020, District 85
Party	Candidate	Votes	%	±%
Democratic	Kevin Windham, Jr.	12,651	100.00%	+17.56
Total votes		12,651	100.00%	

Missouri House of Representatives Election, November 8, 2022, District 74
Party	Candidate	Votes	%	±%
Democratic	Kevin Windham, Jr.	7,451	100.00%	0.00
Total votes		7,451	100.00%	

== Legislative career ==
=== Legislative advocacy ===
In his legislative duties Windham has focused on increasing access to higher education, criminal justice reform, and community revitalization.

=== Notable legislation ===
Rep. Windham has proposed several progressive bills including HB 910 (2021) which would repeal state sales taxes on groceries while implementing an estate tax, HB1354 (2021) which would create the Missouri Office of Racial Equity, and HB 884 (2021) which would make Missouri's A+ Scholarship a first-dollar scholarship.

=== Committee assignments ===
==== 2021–2022 ====
- Higher Education Committee
- Budget Committee
- Elections and Elected Officials Committee, Ranking Minority Member
- Subcommittee on Appropriations – Education
- Subcommittee on Federal Stimulus Spending

==== 2019–2020 ====
- Elections and Elected Officials Committee
- Local Government Committee
- Transportation Committee
- Joint Committee on Transportation Oversight

== Awards ==
- Delux Magazine's Emerging 30 under 30
- Missouri Democratic Party's Young Democrat of the Year
