= Leah Hoffmitz Milken =

Leah Toby Hoffmitz Milken (December 18, 1952 – October 25, 2014) was a Canadian-American typographer, letterform designer, and educator known for her corporate identity work and typography education. Her work shaped the visual language of major corporations including FedEx, Nokia, United Airlines, Disney, and Xerox.

Hoffmitz Milken taught typography and graphic design at ArtCenter College of Design in Pasadena, California for over 20 years, where she influenced a generation of designers who became internationally recognized experts. Following her death, the Hoffmitz Milken Center for Typography was established in her memory with a $4 million endowment.

== Early life and education ==
Born in Toronto, Canada, Hoffmitz was encouraged in typography by her father, who worked as a typesetter. After completing undergraduate studies at the Ontario College of Art and Design, she pursued graduate education at the Allgemeine Gewerbeschule School of Design (Basel School of Design) in Switzerland, studying under Wolfgang Weingart.

The Basel School was renowned for its rigorous approach to typography education, emphasizing systematic thinking and the integration of traditional and experimental methods. The school's educational philosophy of "Observe, Analyze, Create" would later influence Hoffmitz's own teaching approach.

== Career ==
=== Professional Work ===
Hoffmitz specialized in corporate identity design and letterform creation for major corporations. Her notable corporate clients included FedEx, Nokia, United Airlines, Disney, and Xerox. She collaborated with design firms, including GNU Group and Letterform Design, to develop logos, letterforms, and typefaces for a diverse range of clients.

=== Academic career ===
Hoffmitz joined the ArtCenter College of Design faculty in 1992, where she taught for over 20 years until her death. She developed the Digital Font Design program and was known for bridging traditional Basel School methods with contemporary digital typography. Her teaching emphasized the fundamentals of hand-lettering using traditional tools, such as Windsor-Newton brushes and ruling pens, before progressing to digital methods.

Design critic Steven Heller noted that she was "Basel-trained" and "instrumental in helping [students] understand the craft of typography and the minutia of letterforms." Her notable former students include Mike Abbink (Senior Creative Director at Museum of Modern Art), Bryce Shawcross (Tesla Motors), Hansen Smith (Magento), and Josh Finklea (designer of Post Grotesque typeface).

== Recognition and awards ==
Hoffmitz received an Honorary Alumna designation from ArtCenter in 2008 and the Distinguished Achievement Award in 2013 for excellence in teaching and professional accomplishment. She was recognized within the professional design community as a leading expert in letterform design and typography.

== Personal life and death ==
Hoffmitz married businessman and philanthropist Lowell Milken. She died on October 25, 2014, at age 61, after an extended illness. Her death was widely mourned in the design education community, with former student Eric Hu writing that "75% of what I do for a living is because of her."

== Legacy ==
The Hoffmitz Milken Center for Typography at ArtCenter was established with an initial $2 million gift in 2014, later supplemented by an additional $2 million in 2022. The center houses the largest educational letterpress studio in the United States and maintains comprehensive typography archives including Hoffmitz's papers.

The center continues her educational mission through residencies, exhibitions, workshops, and research initiatives. In 2024, the center's "Quasi: Experimental Writing Systems" exhibition won a TDC (Type Directors Club) Award, one of the most prestigious recognitions in typography. Hoffmitz is also recognized in Luc Devroye's comprehensive typography database as a significant figure in American type design.
