= Esther Haywood =

American politician (1940–2024)

Member of the Missouri House of Representatives from the 71st district
- In office January 3, 2001 – January 7, 2009
- Preceded by: Rita Heard Days
- Succeeded by: Don Calloway

Personal details
- Born: Esther Jean Hill; January 15, 1940 Memphis, Tennessee, U.S.
- Died: November 16, 2024 (aged 84) St. Louis, Missouri, U.S.
- Party: Democratic
- Spouse: Edward Jay Haywood
- Children: 2
- Education: Lincoln University
- Alma mater: Mississippi Industrial College (BS); Saint Louis University; Memphis State University
- Occupation: Politician; educator

Esther Jean Haywood (née Hill; January 15, 1940 – November 16, 2024) was an American politician and educator who served in the Missouri House of Representatives from the 71st district from 2001 to 2009.

== Early life ==
Born Esther Jean Hill, Haywood was born on January 15, 1940, in Memphis, Tennessee. She graduated from Barret's Chapel High School. She attended Lincoln University and later graduated from Mississippi Industrial College with a Bachelor of Science. She attended Saint Louis University and completed graduate studies at Memphis State University. She was a charter member of chapter Omicron Eta Omega of the Alpha Kappa Alpha sorority.

== Career ==
Haywood taught math in East St. Louis School District 189 for 30 years, including the Donald McHenry School. She taught fourth grade in Marion, Arkansas, and was one of five black teachers at that time to integrate into Memphis-Shelby County Schools. She also served in Normandy School District's board of education for 18 years, starting in 1983.

Haywood was a Democrat. She was elected in 2000 and represented the 71st district of the Missouri House of Representatives for four terms from 2001 to 2009.

Haywood was a member of the Normandy Hospital Guild. She was president of St. Louis County's NAACP.

== Personal life ==
She married Edward Jay Haywood. They were married for 55 years. They lived in St. Louis County. She had two daughters. She was a member of Murchison Tabernacle Christian Methodist Episcopal Church.

Haywood died on November 16, 2024, in St. Louis, Missouri, aged 84.

== Awards ==
Haywood received a number of awards, including the Hill to Hill Award from Lincoln University, the Lifetime Achievement Award from AFT of District 189, NAACP's National Youth Work Award, and Legislator of the Year from both AT&T Missouri and the University of Missouri–St. Louis.
