= Pierce Pennant Motor Hotel =

- U.S. National Register of Historic Places
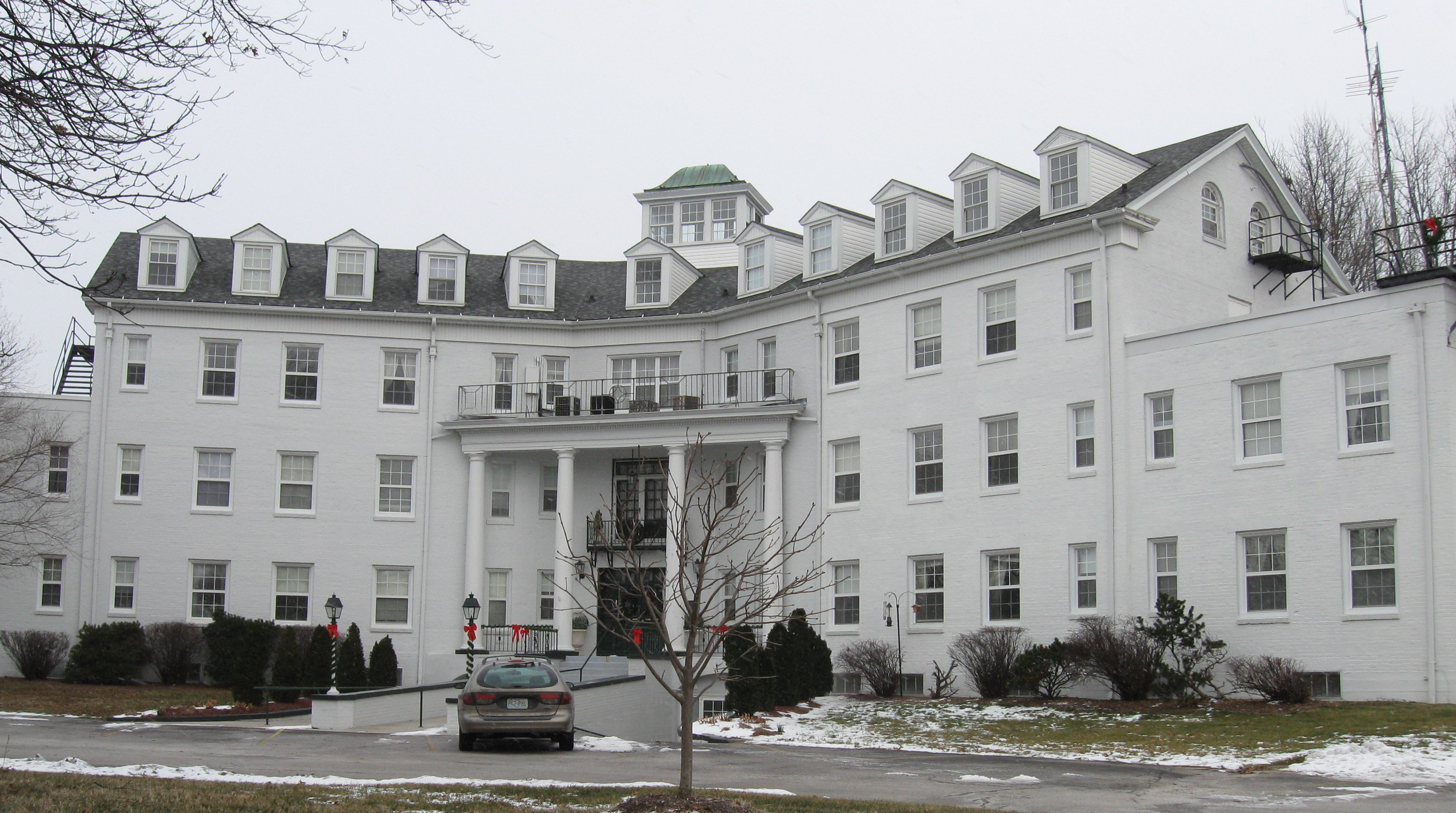

- Location within Missouri Location within the United States
- Location: 1406 Business Loop 70 West, Columbia, Missouri
- Coordinates: 38°58′2″N 92°21′32″W
- Area: 8.7 acres (3.5 ha)
- Built: 1929
- Architect: Nelson, Beverly T.; Johnson, Will W.
- Architectural style: Colonial Revival, Williamsburg restoration
- NRHP reference No.: 82003125
- Added to NRHP: September 02, 1982

The Pierce Pennant Motor Hotel, also known as the Candle Light Lodge, is a historic hotel complex that is located on what once was U.S. Route 40, which is now known as Business Loop 70 West in Columbia, Missouri. The hotel complex was constructed in 1929 and is in the Colonial Revival style. The hotel was also a gas station and garage, and was owned by Pierce Petroleum Company, a subsidiary of Standard Oil. Initially the hotel and garage complex was to be one of several along U.S. Hwy 40, each to be spaced about 150 miles apart from New York to San Francisco. Senator Harry S. Truman was staying at the hotel when he learned of the Attack on Pearl Harbor, heralding the United States entry in World War II.

During World War II the building was used by Stephens College to train women aviators. In 1959, the complex was Candle Light Lodge and converted to senior citizen housing.

It was placed on the National Register of Historic Places in 1982.
