= Senior Hall (Columbia, Missouri) =

- U.S. National Register of Historic Places
- U.S. Historic district – Contributing property
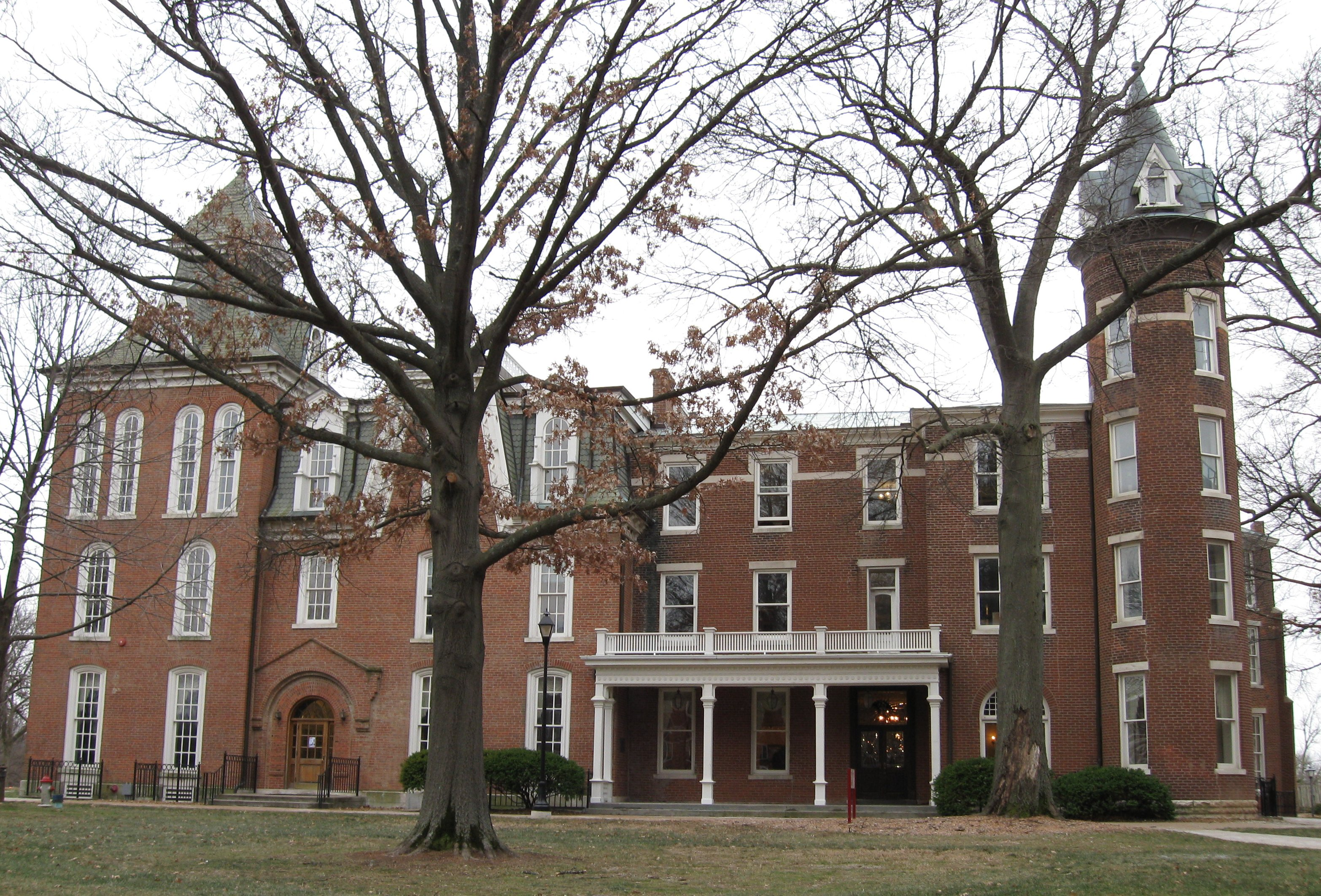

- Location within Missouri Location within the United States
- Location: Stephens College campus, Columbia, Missouri
- Coordinates: 38°57′1″N 92°19′23″W
- Area: less than one acre
- Built: 1841
- Architect: Clarke, C.B.; Morris Frederick Bell
- NRHP reference No.: 77000799
- Added to NRHP: August 2, 1977

Senior Hall is a former dormitory (now repurposed for other uses) on the Stephens College campus in Columbia, Missouri. It was originally a house built for Oliver Parker 1841, when he bought the eight-acre tract of land on which the College was first located. In 1857, the Columbia Baptist Female College, which later became Stephens College, acquired the building. It was expanded in 1870 and 1890. A complete restoration of Senior Hall began in the spring of 1987, and the building was rededicated in the spring of 1990. The auditorium was demolished as a cost saving measure in 2000.

Senior Hall was the only dormitory at the College until 1918. It was the tradition for the President of the Civic Association (now the Student Government Association) to occupy the first floor room just north of the Waugh Street entrance.

Senior Hall was placed on the National Register of Historic Places in 1977.
