= Warehouse Theatre (Stephens) =

Theater at Stephens College in Columbia, Missouri, US

- Location: Columbia, Missouri; United States
- Owner: Stephens College
- Type: college theater
- Events: plays, musicals

Construction
- Opened: 1969

The Warehouse Theatre is a black box theatre operated by Stephens Collage in Columbia, Missouri, and serves as a performance space for student-run productions, including those from the Conservatory for the Performing Arts. As a women's college, Stephens has historically admitted a very limited number of males as students in the School of Creative and Performing Arts Theatre and Dance programs. The theater typically does four shows per year, two per semester.

The theater regularly hosts musicals, plays, and student-produced works, with tickets managed through the college's online box office.

The Warehouse Theatre Company, a student-led organization, produces several shows each season and offers students hands-on experience in directing, acting, and stage management.

== Mission statement ==
”The Warehouse fosters freedom of material and vision by producing original scripts, avant-garde pieces, and socially poignant works which, more often than not, highlight women’s issues and experiences.”

== The Warehouse Board ==
There are usually 11 members on the Warehouse board. These members are in charge of different aspects of the company. As a whole, they make important decisions about the Warehouse season, including choosing the shows, and also plan and organize events, such as fundraisers or open mic nights. While the first year, second year, and conservatory representatives are elected at the beginning of the new academic year, the other board members are elected at the middle of the second semester of the previous year.

== Events ==
In addition to putting on four shows, the Warehouse hosts numerous events throughout the year.

=== Warehouse Dance ===
Generally at the end and/or beginning of the school year the Warehouse will host a themed dance for all to enjoy.

=== Open Mic Night ===
One Wednesday every month, the Warehouse hosts an open mic night. These open mic nights are designed as a way to give Stephens students an outlet to express themselves and entertain others. Students can dance, sing, perform, do stand-up, read poetry or do whatever they want. Students of all majors are encouraged to come and show off what they can do.

=== Play-in-a-Day ===
Starting in February 2012 the Warehouse hosted a 24-Play Festival. Students wrote, directed, memorized, designed, and performed an hour of 10-minute plays, all in 24 hours. In 2019, this was scheduled to be replaced with the first-ever Short Play Festival but was canceled due to COVID-19.

== Past events ==
The Warehouse had a few traditions that have not been passed on in recent years, but up until then had been annual. Some are as follows.

=== Musical revue ===
In the past, the Warehouse presented a musical revue every year. The revue is entirely musically directed, choreographed and performed by students. In 2009, the revue was entitled Bombs Away: A Musical Revue of Flops and in 2008, it was called De-Briefing: A Night of Women Singing Some of Musical Theatre's Most Popular Songs for Men.

== Shows ==
Show	Author	Year	Type
Gidion's Knot	Johnna Adams	October 2020	Drama (filmed)
Everyman	unknown	February 2020	Drama
Neighborhood 3: Requisition of Doom	Jennifer Haley	November 2019	Thriller
The Amish Project	Jessica Dickey	September 2019	Drama
Anton in Show Business	Jane Martin	April 2019	Comedy
Machinal	Sophie Treadwell	February 2019	Drama
Sans Merci	Johnna Adams	December 2018	Tragedy
The Anastasia Trials in the Court of Women	Carolyn Gage	October 2018	Drama
Chamber Music/No Exit	Arthur Kopit/Jean-Paul Sartre	April 2009	One acts
Moonlight and Valentino	Ellen Simon	February 2009	Sentimental comedy
Bombs Away: A Revue of Flops		February 2009	Musical revue
The Great Cross Country Race	Alan Broadhurst	November 2008	Children's show
Snake in the Grass	Alan Ayckbourn	October 2008	Thriller
One Act Play Festival		April 2008	
Triptych	Edna O'Brien	February 2008	Drama
The Most Massive Woman Wins	Madeleine George	November 2007	Drama
De-Briefing		October 2007	Musical revue
Naomi in the Living Room	Christopher Durang	October 2007	Absurd
Marion Bridge	Daniel MacIvor	April 2007	Sentimental comedy
43 Plays for 43 Presidents	Chicago's Neo-Futurists Theatre Collective	February 2007	Absurd
Cover of Life	R.T. Robinson	November 2006	
Extremities	William Mastrosimone	October 2006	Drama

== Academic Role ==
The Warehouse Theatre plays a central role in Stephens College's Conservatory for the Performing Arts, serving as a hands-on training ground for students enrolled in performance-based degree programs. Most notably, it is used by students pursuing a Bachelor of Fine Arts (BFA) in Musical Theatre and a BFA in Theatre Arts, who participate in all aspects of production — from acting and directing to lighting, costuming, and stage management.

This immersive environment is designed to mirror professional standards, allowing students to build practical experience and gain creative autonomy within a controlled academic framework. As part of their coursework, students audition for roles, propose original works, and engage in collaborative critique, guided by faculty and guest artists. The Warehouse Theatre Company — a fully student-run organization — frequently produces shows in the space, often selecting material and overseeing production schedules independently, fostering leadership and entrepreneurship in young theater-makers.

The Warehouse is considered an extension of the classroom, providing what Stephens College calls a “learn-by-doing” conservatory model. Productions staged here are often tied to semester-long learning goals and serve as capstone projects or juried performances.
