= Wendy B. Libby =

American college administrator

Wendy B. Libby, a native of Brooklyn, New York, is an American college administrator. She attended Cornell University and received a Bachelor's (Biology) in 1972, an MBA from Cornell's Johnson Graduate School of Management in 1977. She earned her doctorate in Educational Administration from the University of Connecticut in 1994. She was president of Stephens College in Columbia, Missouri, the second oldest women's institute in America, from 2003 to 2009. She was named the ninth president of Stetson University in July 2009.
