= Traditional student =

Category of students at colleges and universities

A traditional student is a category of students at colleges and universities. Traditional students are contrasted with non-traditional students.

In the United States, it is used to refer to undergraduate students under 25 years old who enroll directly from high school, attend full-time, and do not have major life and work responsibilities (e.g., full-time job or dependents). Currently around 75% of undergrads have at least 1 nontraditional characteristic.

It is frequently observed that traditional higher education programs and policies are geared toward, and the outcome of, the previous era when traditional students were the main market for higher education.
