= Nontraditional student =

Category of students at colleges and universities

Non-Traditional student is a category of students at colleges and universities in North America and usually involves age and social characteristics. Non-traditional students are contrasted with traditional students.

The United States Department of Education estimated that 73% of all undergraduates in the United States attending accredited institutions in 1999–2000 had one or more nontraditional characteristics. This remained consistent in the following years: 72% in 2003–2004, 72% for 2007–2008, and 74% for 2011–2012.

== Definition and history ==
It is uncertain exactly how or when the term “nontraditional student” was first incorporated into educational language. However, it is thought that K. Patricia Cross is responsible for the phrase becoming the accepted and appropriate term to describe adult students. In the United States, gender was a defining characteristic of nontraditional students, with women (particularly older women) being viewed as unusual; but gender is no longer a defining characteristic of nontraditional students in the United States due to women making up most of the college population and the decline of male students.

Scholars disagree on the exact definition of nontraditional. Modern defining characteristics usually include social traits and age. Most studies agree that undergraduates age 25 or older are classified as nontraditional. Most studies also agree that part-time students are nontraditional, but there is disagreement in literature.

According to National Center for Education Statistics (NCES) other defining characteristics of nontraditional students are:

- Delays enrollment (does not enter postsecondary education in the same calendar year that high school ended)
- Attends part time for at least part of the academic year
- Works full-time (35 hours or more per week) while enrolled
- Is considered financially independent for purposes of determining eligibility for financial aid
- Has dependents other than a spouse (usually children, but may also be caregivers of sick or elderly family members)
- Does not have a high school diploma (completed high school with a GED or other high school completion certificate or did not finish high school)

== Demographics ==
Regarding the 2011-2012 demographics distribution of nontraditional undergraduate students in the United States, the following were identified by the National Center for Education Statistics:

- 49% dependent and 51% independent
- 28% has dependent(s) and 72% has no dependent
- 15% single with dependent and 85% single with no dependent
- 91% high school graduate and 9% high school equivalency
- 66% delayed postsecondary enrollment less than one year and 34% delayed postsecondary enrollment one year or more
- 57% fulltime student and 43% part-time student
- 26% worked full time, 36% worked part time, and 38% did not work.

In 1999–2000, the most common nontraditional characteristics included financial independence (51 percent), part-time attendance (48 percent), and delayed enrollment (46 percent).

The NCES divides tertiary educational institutions into three categories: public, private-non-profit, and private-for-profit (PFP). With regard to the age demographic of students enrolled in these institutions, the NCES uses three age categories: under 25, between 25 and 34, and 35 and older. According to its most recent publication, in a section called The Condition of Education 2013,"most nontraditional students are enrolled in PFP’s. In fact, for the fall enrollment in 2011, in four-year PFP institutions 71% full-time and 78% part-time students were at least 25 years old or older. In two-year PFP institutions, 52% full-time and 61% part-time students were also included in this 'nontraditional' category."

== Special characteristics ==
Nontraditional students frequently have different characteristics than traditional students, experience different barriers, and have different instructional and campus support needs than traditional students.

While many institutions offer programs for nontraditional students and services in response to their specific needs, it is frequently observed that traditional higher education programs and policies are geared toward, and the outcome of, the previous era when traditional students were the main market for higher education. Institutional barriers most frequently identified in research include difficulty obtaining financial support, negative attitudes toward adult learners, a general lack of resources at times and places suitable to adult learners, and recognition of prior learning and academic credentials. The nontraditional student designation has also to a lesser extent been used to refer to socially, economically or educationally disadvantaged students.

Situational barriers most frequently experienced by adult nontraditional students typically include managing multiple conflicting responsibilities in addition to their studies (e.g., life and work responsibilities and roles), financial problems and limited financial aid options for nontraditional students, lack of adequate and affordable childcare services, and lack of support from others.

Attitudinal barriers most frequently identified in research include low self-esteem and negative attitudes about being an adult learner.

Barriers related to academic skills most frequently discussed in the literature include a lack of knowledge and experience in literacy, numeracy, and computer-related skills, accessing and understanding information, critical and reflective thinking, essay writing, and writing examinations and tests.

An Australian study conducted in 2017 sampled 442 (316 female, 126 male) first year undergraduate psychology students at a major publicly funded university. Data was drawn from an online mental health survey to measure student resilience. Resilience can be defined as the ‘personal qualities that enable one to thrive in the face of adversity’ (Connor and Davidson, 2003: 76). The Connor–Davidson Resilience Scale (CD-RISC 10; Campbell-Sills and Stein, 2007) was adopted as a measure of resilience. Out of the total 442 respondents, 25.6% identified themselves as ‘non-traditional’ students (n = 113). Those who identified themselves as ‘non-traditional’ were significantly different from those who considered themselves as ‘traditional’ on a number of demographic measures. They were more likely to be male, older, hold a previous degree, study part-time, be an international student, speak a language other than English, have longer gap year, have more children, be reliant on government financial aid, work longer hours and admit to university via methods alternative to the standard pathway (i.e. Australian Tertiary Admission Rank). The most common reason that students used to identify themselves as ‘non-traditional’ was age (58.4%, n = 66). Other reasons included cultural background (43.4%, n = 50), admission pathway (42.5%, n = 48), geographical origin (30.1%, n = 34), being employed (25.7%, n = 29), household income (20.4%, n = 23), being a parent (18.6%, n = 21) and mode of study (14.2%, n = 16). Seventeen students nominated other reasons (15.9%, n = 17), including richer life experience and reason for study (e.g. for self-improvement rather than occupational reasons). The major finding from this study is that those who perceived themselves to be ‘non-traditional’, particularly in terms of age, roles as a parent and role as an employee, have reported higher resilience.

== See also ==
- Adult education
- Adult learner (known as "mature student" in the UK)
- Alpha Sigma Lambda
- Continuing education
- First-generation college students in the United States
