= Center on Education and the Workforce =

American research institute

The Center on Education and the Workforce (CEW) is an independent, non-partisan research institute affiliated with Georgetown University in Washington, D.C., United States. The center carries out research with the goal of better aligning education and training with workforce and labor demand.

== Areas of research ==
The three areas of research are:

- Jobs: monitoring the supply and demand for educated and skilled labor and linking postsecondary curricula with career opportunities;
- Skills: mapping the specification of 21st Century occupation competencies, and the ties to education and training frameworks;
- People: identifying the effect of changing job requirements and skills demand on students and current workers, with a focus on access and success by race and socioeconomic status.

The center uses data from federal and state statistical agencies, and from private data organizations that provide employment projections, population estimates, and other economic indicators. These include: National Center for Education Statistics, O*NET, the Bureau of Labor Statistics, Current Population Statistics, and the Census.

== Staffing and funding ==
The center is staffed by senior research economists with backgrounds in education, economics, and issues pertaining to social mobility. Its director is labor economist Anthony Carnevale. The center is funded by grants from the Lumina Foundation for Education and the Bill & Melinda Gates Foundation.

== Publications ==
In June 2010 the Center published Help Wanted: Projections of Jobs and Education Requirements Through 2018. The report projected education demand for jobs, by industry and occupation, through to 2018. The report predicted that by 2018, 63% of all jobs in the United States would require some form of postsecondary education. Published simultaneously was the same report broken down by state, for all fifty states and the District of Columbia. An updated study of January 2016 indicated that 65% of jobs would require postsecondary education by 2020.

In June 2016 the CEW's report America's Divided Recovery was released, showing that over 95% of jobs created during the US economic recovery had gone to college-educated workers.
