= North Village Arts District =

Neighborhood in Columbia, Missouri, USA

Coordinates: 38.953457°N 92.324907°W

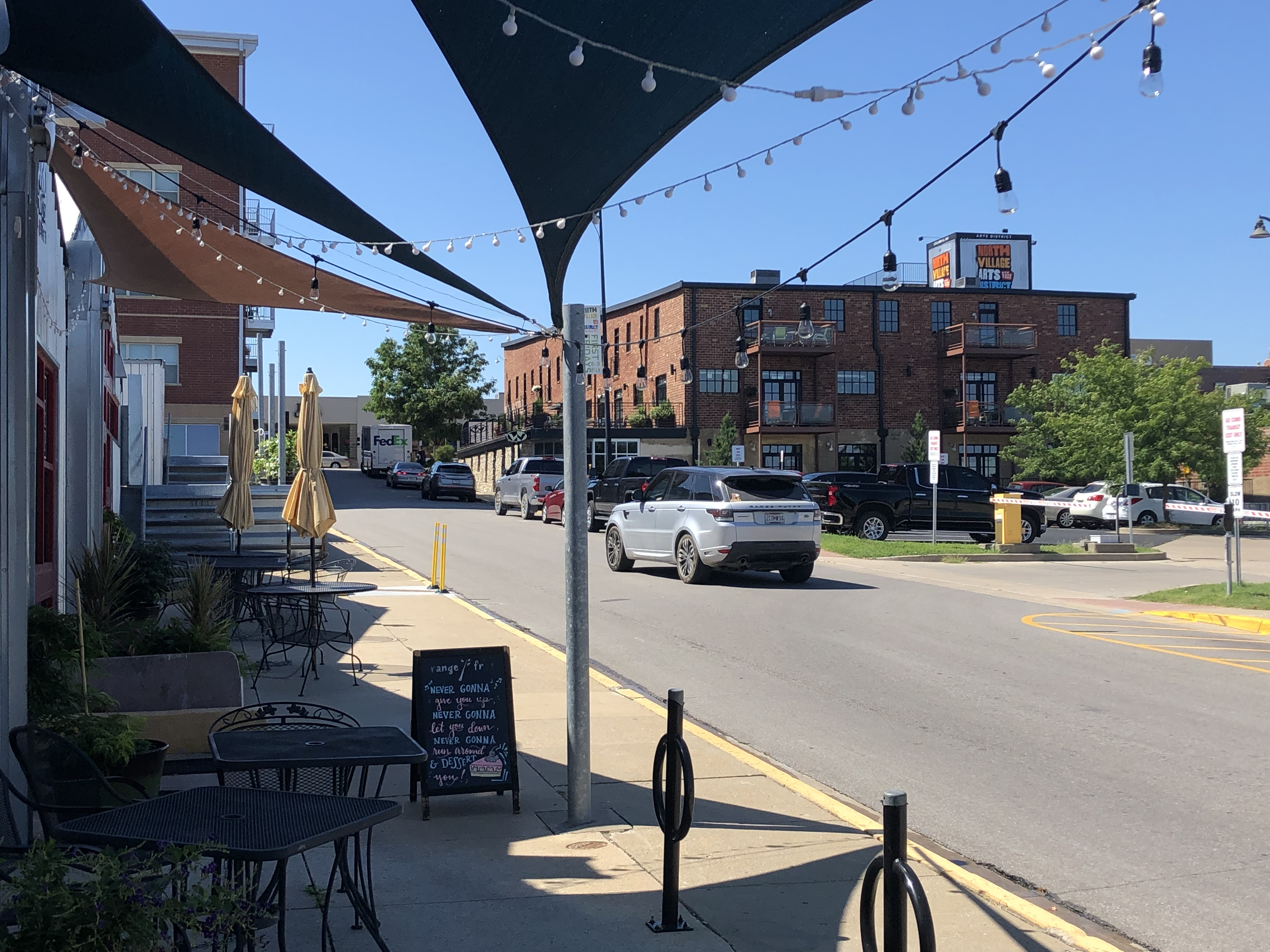
The North Village Arts District as viewed from the patio of Range Free, an allergen-free bakery and cafe.

The North Village Arts District is a neighborhood and arts district in Columbia, Missouri. It is located on the northeast side of Downtown Columbia, and is the city's main art gallery district and center for the visual arts. The neighborhood is also home to restaurants, bars, food trucks, housewares shops, theaters, and a distillery. Rose Music Hall, a popular music venue, is located on Park Avenue. There are several dance studios, including the Missouri Contemporary Ballet. The district hosts a monthly art crawl called "First Fridays".

Wabash Station, a restored railroad station, is the headquarters and central hub of Columbia Public Transit. The station previously served the Columbia Terminal Railroad, which brought passengers and goods into Columbia throughout the 1900s. The railroad was the primary cause of the neighborhood's original industrial nature. Today, many of the district's businesses are located in renovated warehouses and industrial buildings. A former gas manufacturing site, now owned by Ameren, may be turned into public green space.

Several buildings in the neighborhood are listed on the National Register of Historic Places, including Wabash Station, the Boone County Courthouse, Columbia National Guard Armory, Elkins House, First Christian Church, and McCain Furniture Store. Two National Historic Districts are partially within the neighborhood: the Downtown Columbia Historic District, and the North Ninth Street Historic District. The district is adjacent to Stephens College and Columbia College.

== Ameren lot ==
In the nineteenth and twentieth centuries Columbia Gas Works operated a coal gasification plant at the corner of Ash and Orr streets. The company was purchased by the Union Electric Company (now Ameren) and eventually ceased producing gas in 1932. The gasification process contaminated the soil and some groundwater in the area with carcinogenic chemicals. Ameren continues to own, and until recently, operate from the location. In June 2014, Ameren was removing contaminated soil from the area, and expected to finish by September 2014. The land is currently fenced and unused. As of 2019 the city is considering purchasing the lot to create a public park. Ameren has been criticized by the North Village Board of Directors and community for its treatment of "a whole city block that is in disrepair and [...] an aversion to commerce."

== See also ==
- Museum of Art and Archaeology
- Crossroads Arts District
