= Wright Brothers Mule Barn =

- U.S. National Register of Historic Places
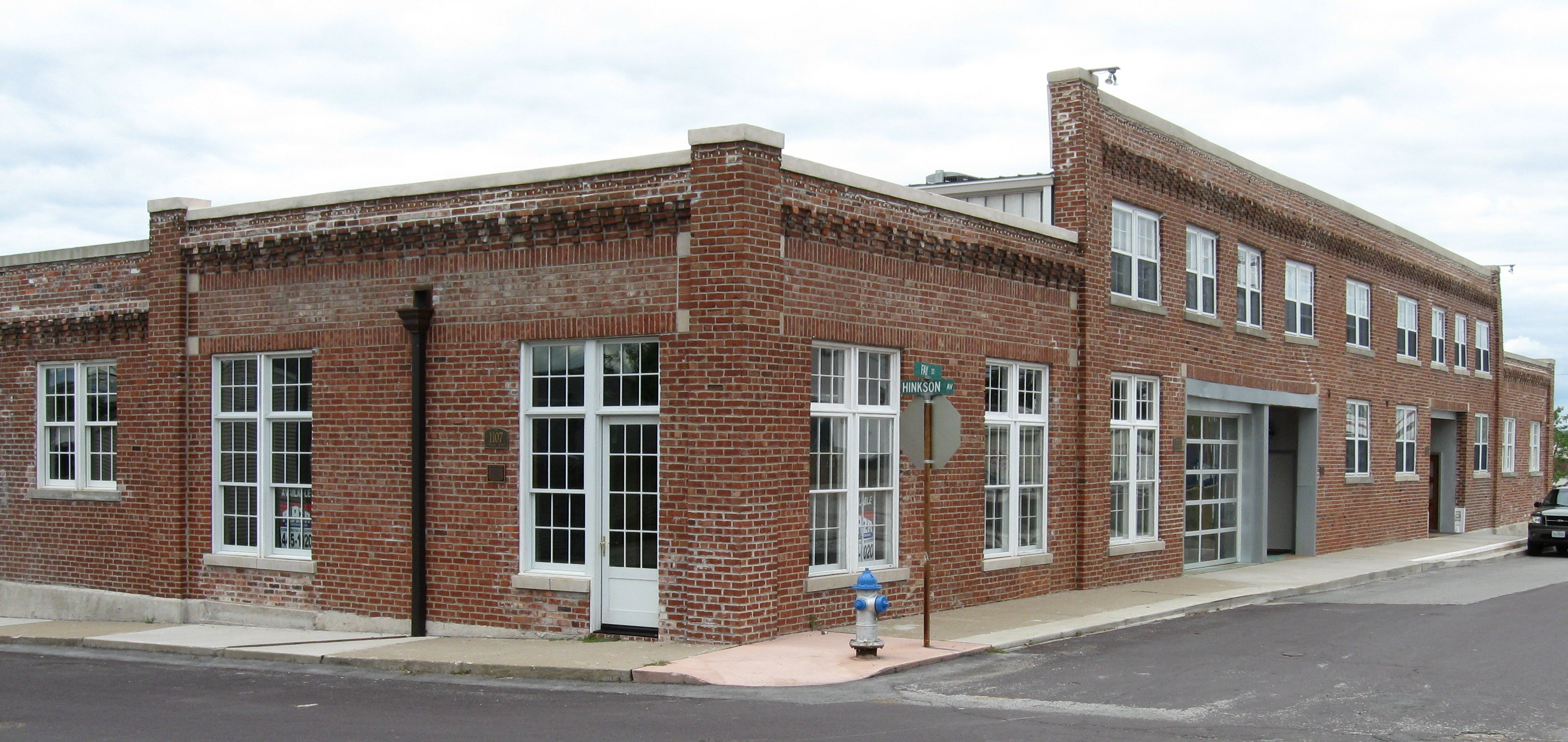

- Location within Missouri Location within the United States
- Location: 1101-1107 Hinkson Ave. & 501-507 Fay St., Columbia, Missouri
- Coordinates: 38°57′26″N 92°19′22″W
- Area: 0.5 acres (0.20 ha)
- Architect: Gedney, Jesse(y) I.; Strickler, Joe
- Architectural style: one and two-part industrial
- NRHP reference No.: 07001119
- Added to NRHP: November 01, 2007

The Wright Brothers Mule Barn, also known as Rader Packing Co. Bldg. and Diggs Building, is a historic structure built by L.W. and B.C. Wright located at Columbia, Missouri. It is located in an industrial area north of Downtown Columbia, Missouri. The 1 1/2-story masonry building was Mid-Missouri's leading mule facility in the 1920s. Today the building has been restored and renovated and offices and lofts.

The property was added to the National Register of Historic Places in 2007.
