= Samuel H. and Isabel Smith Elkins House =

Historic house in Missouri, United States

- U.S. National Register of Historic Places
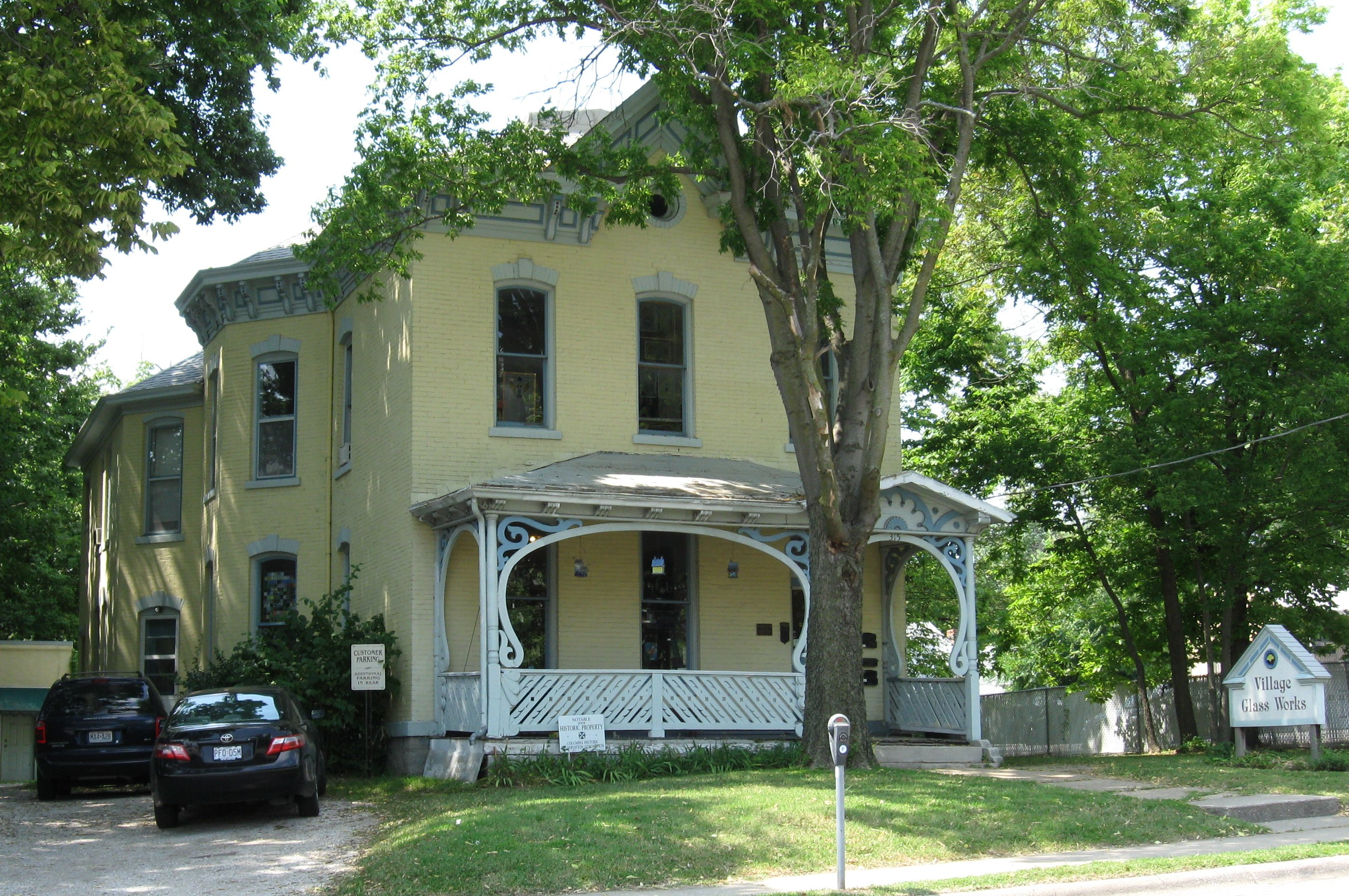

- Location within Missouri Location within the United States
- Location: 315 N. 10th St., Columbia, Missouri
- Coordinates: 38°57′20″N 92°19′36″W
- Area: less than one acre
- Built: c, 1882
- Architectural style: Italianate
- NRHP reference No.: 96001012
- Added to NRHP: September 12, 1996

The Samuel H. and Isabel Smith Elkins House is a historic home in Columbia, Missouri. The home is located just north of Downtown Columbia, Missouri on 9th street and today contains an artisan glassworks. The large two-story brick residence was built about 1882 in the Italianate style.

The property was placed on the National Register of Historic Places in 1996. It is located within the North Village Arts District.

== See also ==
- Maplewood (Columbia, Missouri), another Italianate style home in Columbia, Missouri
