= Columbia station (Wabash Railroad) =

- Wabash Railroad Station and Freight House
- U.S. National Register of Historic Places
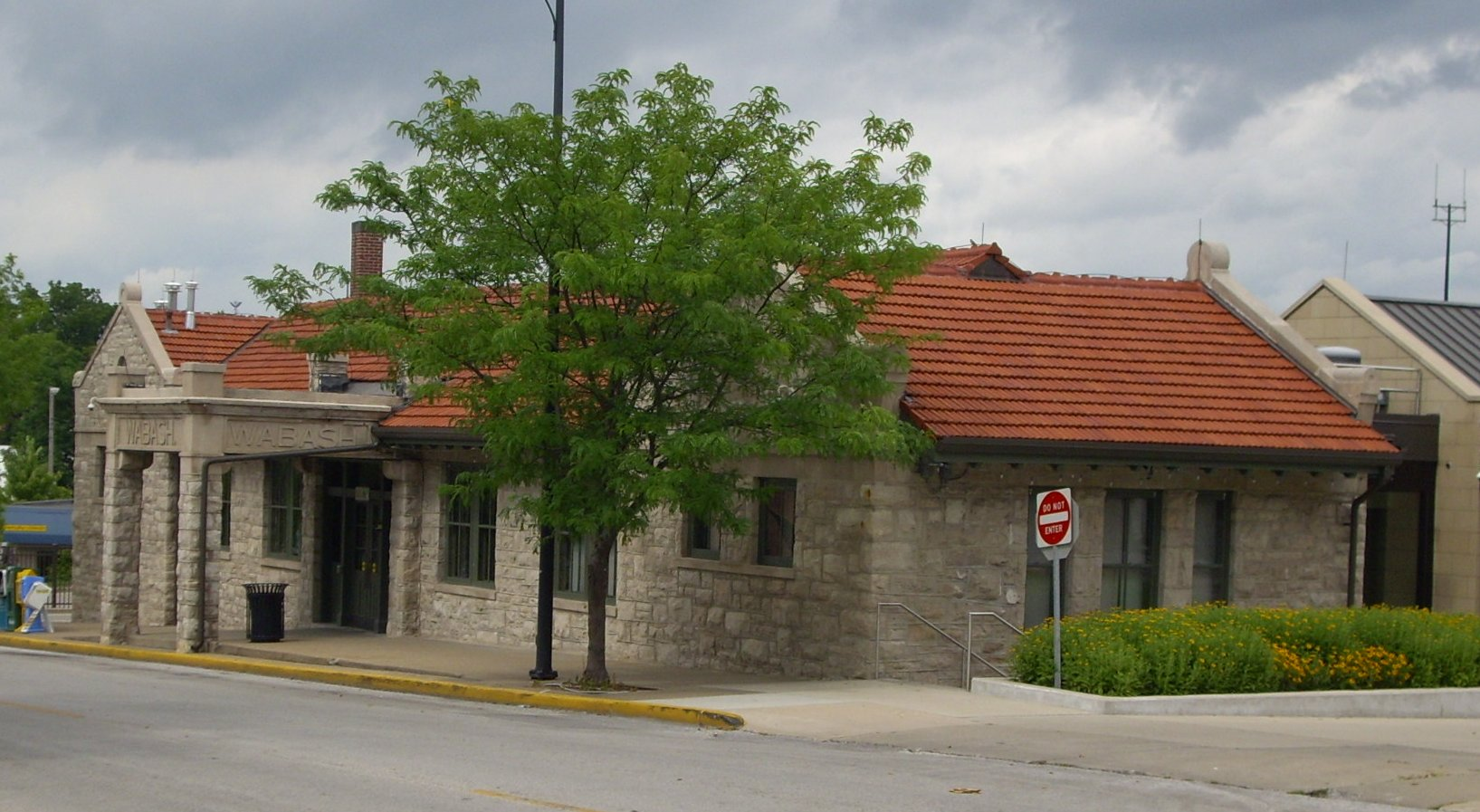

- Location within Missouri Location within the United States
- Location: 126 N. 10th St., Columbia, Missouri
- Coordinates: 38°57′12″N 92°19′34″W
- Area: less than one acre
- Built: 1909
- Architect: Wolfe, Leonard
- Architectural style: Tudor Revival, Jacobean style
- NRHP reference No.: 79001351
- Added to NRHP: October 11, 1979

Columbia station is a historic train station and headquarters of Columbia Transit located in Columbia, Missouri, United States. The building was constructed in 1909 as the terminus of the Columbia Branch of the Wabash Railroad (now Columbia Terminal Railroad). It is a one-story, H plan, Tudor Revival style building constructed of locally quarried rock faced ashlar cut stone. In 2007, the building underwent renovation and restoration and was expanded to accommodate offices for Columbia's public transportation. The project, costing over $2.5 million, was intended to make the station a multi-model transportation center. It was certified at the LEED (Leadership in Energy and Environmental Design) Silver Level, meaning it meets national standards for energy efficiency and sustainable construction. The station is the busiest bus stop in Columbia and served as a pickup point for Megabus until September of 2015.

The property was listed on the National Register of Historic Places in 1979 as the Wabash Railroad Station and Freight House. It is located in the North Village Arts District.

== See also ==
- Go COMO
- List of intercity bus stops in Missouri

Preceding station	Wabash Railroad	Following station
Terminus	Columbia Branch	Switzler toward Centralia
