= Eighth and Broadway Historic District =

Historic district in Missouri, United States

- U.S. National Register of Historic Places
- U.S. Historic district
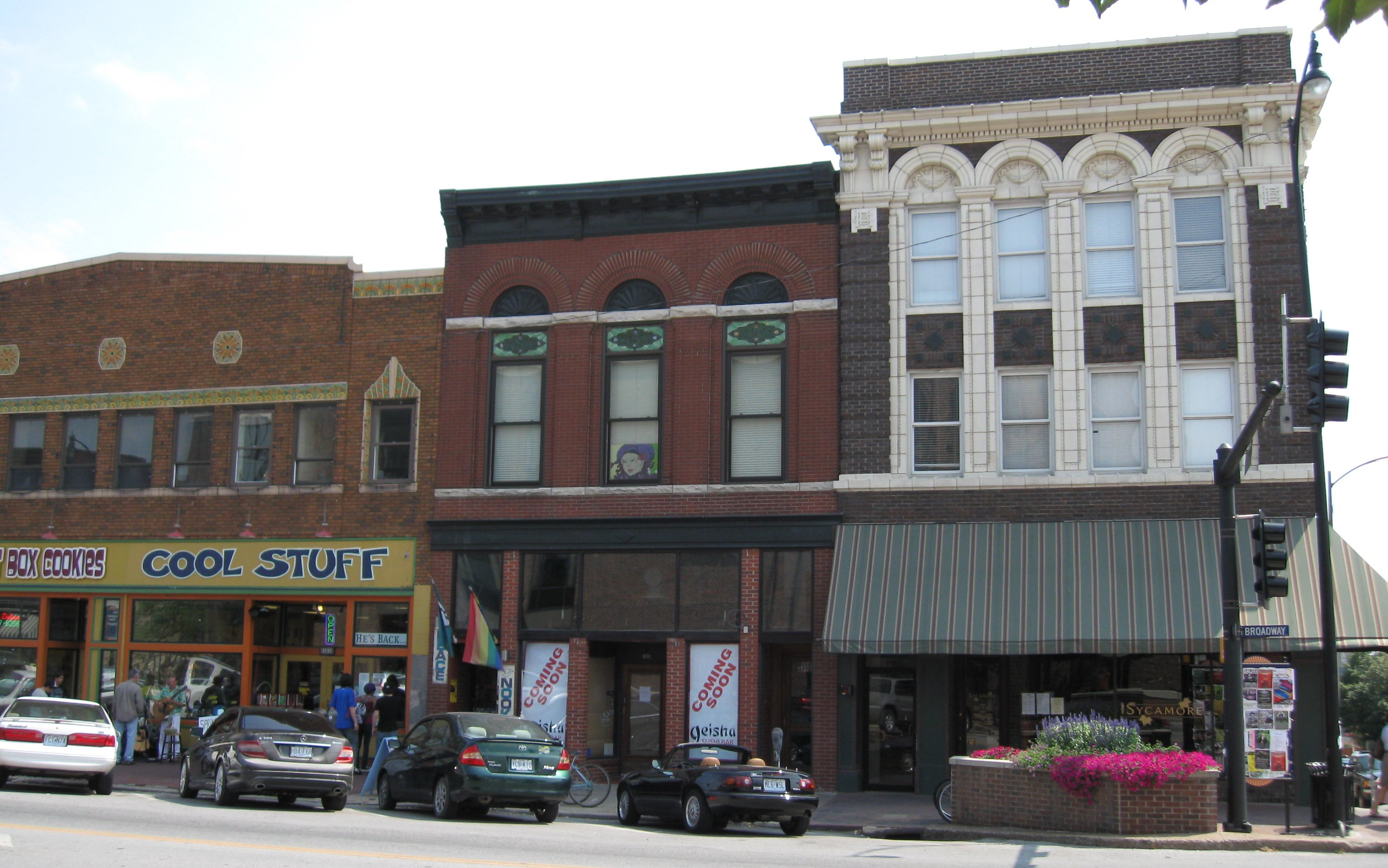
- The district's three contributing properties from Broadway

- Location within Missouri Location within the United States
- Location: 800-810 E. Broadway Blvd., Columbia, Missouri
- Coordinates: 38°57′4″N 92°19′42″W
- Area: less than one acre
- Built: 1894
- Architect: Johnson Brothers
- Architectural style: Italianate, Art Deco, et al.
- NRHP reference No.: 03000298
- Added to NRHP: April 22, 2003

The Eighth and Broadway Historic District is one of the seven national historic districts located in Columbia, Missouri. The district is made up of three contributing properties and is located at the intersection of Eighth and Broadway Streets in Downtown Columbia. They consist of the Beaux-Arts style Miller Building (1910), the Italianate style Matthews Hardware (c. 1894), and the Art Deco style Metropolitan Building (c. 1930). Today, the area holds loft apartments and several local business including Rally House, Sycamore, Peace Nook, and Geisha.

It was listed on the National Register of Historic Places in 2003.
