= Virginia Building =

- U.S. National Register of Historic Places
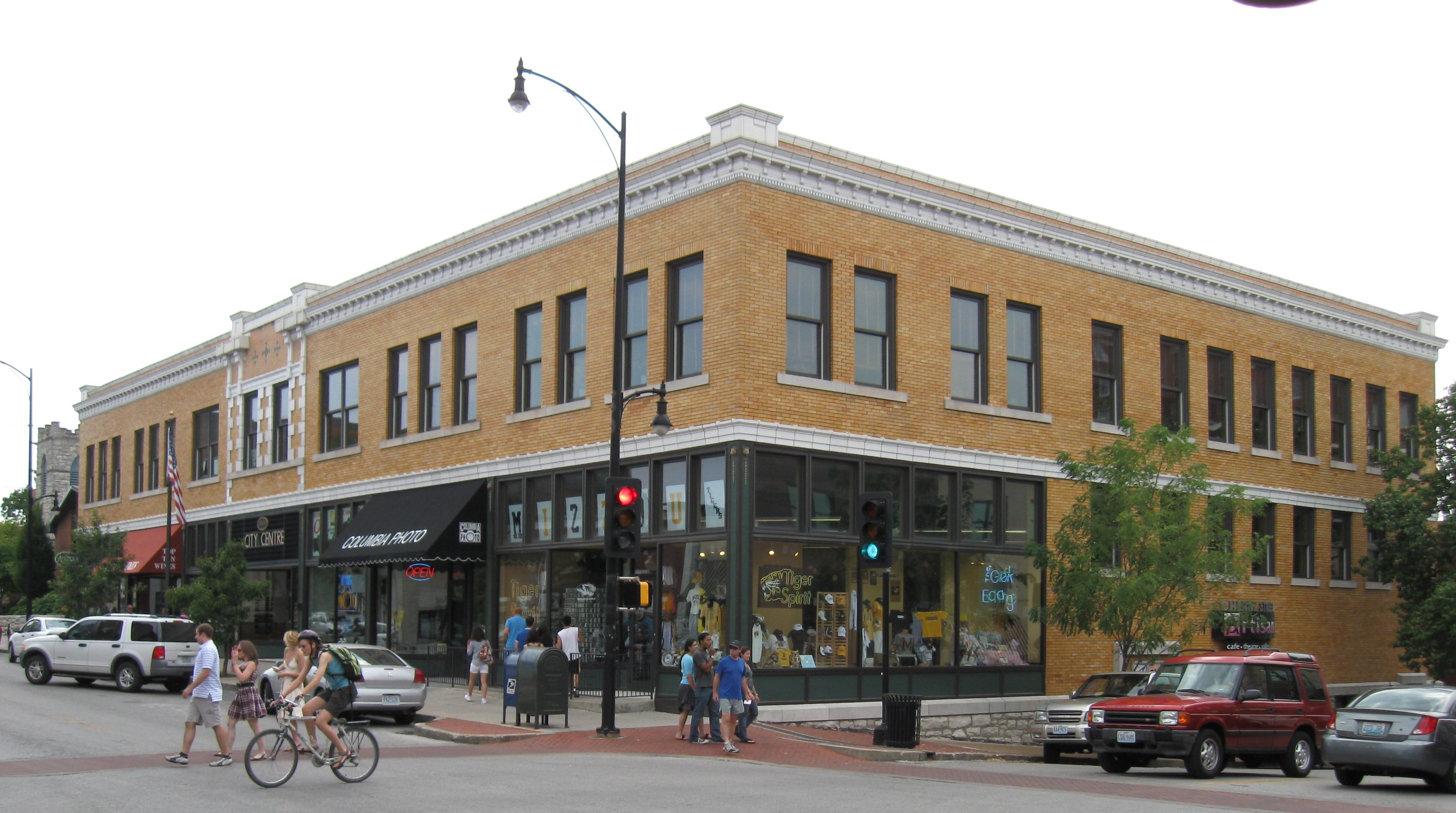

- Location within Missouri Location within the United States
- Location: 111 S. Ninth St., Columbia, Missouri
- Coordinates: 38°57′1″N 92°19′40″W
- Area: less than one acre
- Built: 1911
- Architectural style: two-part commercial
- NRHP reference No.: 02000163
- Added to NRHP: March 13, 2002

The Virginia Building, also known as the Strollway Center and Montgomery Ward Building, is a historic commercial building located at the corner of 9th and Cherry Streets in Downtown Columbia, Missouri. It was originally built in 1911 to house one of the first urban Montgomery Ward department stores. It is a two-story building with a flat roof and gold brick walls. Today the building houses several local businesses including, the Cherry Street Artisan and Columbia Photo.

In 2002, after an extensive restoration the building was placed on the National Register of Historic Places.
