= Columbia Terminal Railroad =

Freight railroad in Boone County, Missouri, US

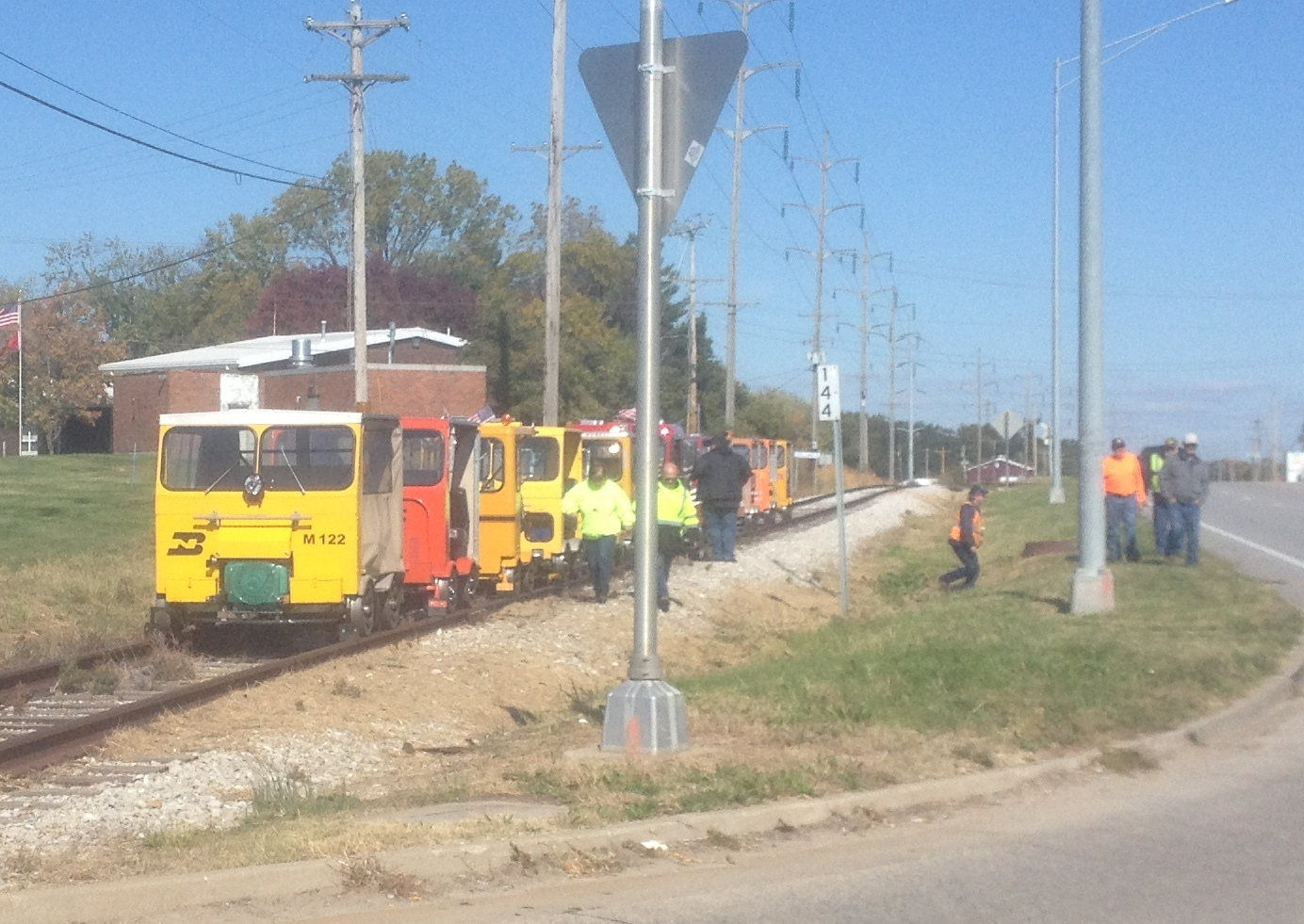

Overview
- Reporting mark: CT
- Locale: Columbia, Boone County, Missouri, United States
- Dates of operation: 1987–present

The Columbia Terminal Railroad (reporting mark CT) is a local, short-line, freight railroad in Boone County, Missouri, owned by and serving the city of Columbia, Missouri. The railroad runs from Columbia to the Norfolk Southern Railway mainline in Centralia, using the former Columbia Branch of the Wabash Railroad.

Formerly, the line carried passengers to the Wabash Railroad Station and Freight House in Downtown Columbia, Missouri. The line was created by the Boone County and Jefferson City Railroad Company, incorporated 1857. Construction began after the American Civil War and was completed in 1867.

== History ==
The 21.7-mile (34.9 km) line between Columbia and Centralia was completed by the Boone County and Jefferson City Railroad in 1867; the North Missouri Railroad, a predecessor of the Wabash Railroad, had leased that company the previous year. After a series of reorganizations and mergers the Wabash took direct ownership of the branch in 1902. When the Norfolk Southern Railway, successor to the Wabash, proposed the abandon the line in 1987, the city of Columbia acquired the line and created the Columbia Terminal Railroad to serve freight customers along the route.

== See also ==
- Boone County Historical Society
- List of cemeteries in Boone County, Missouri
