= North Missouri Railroad =

Former railroad in Iowa and Missouri, U.S.

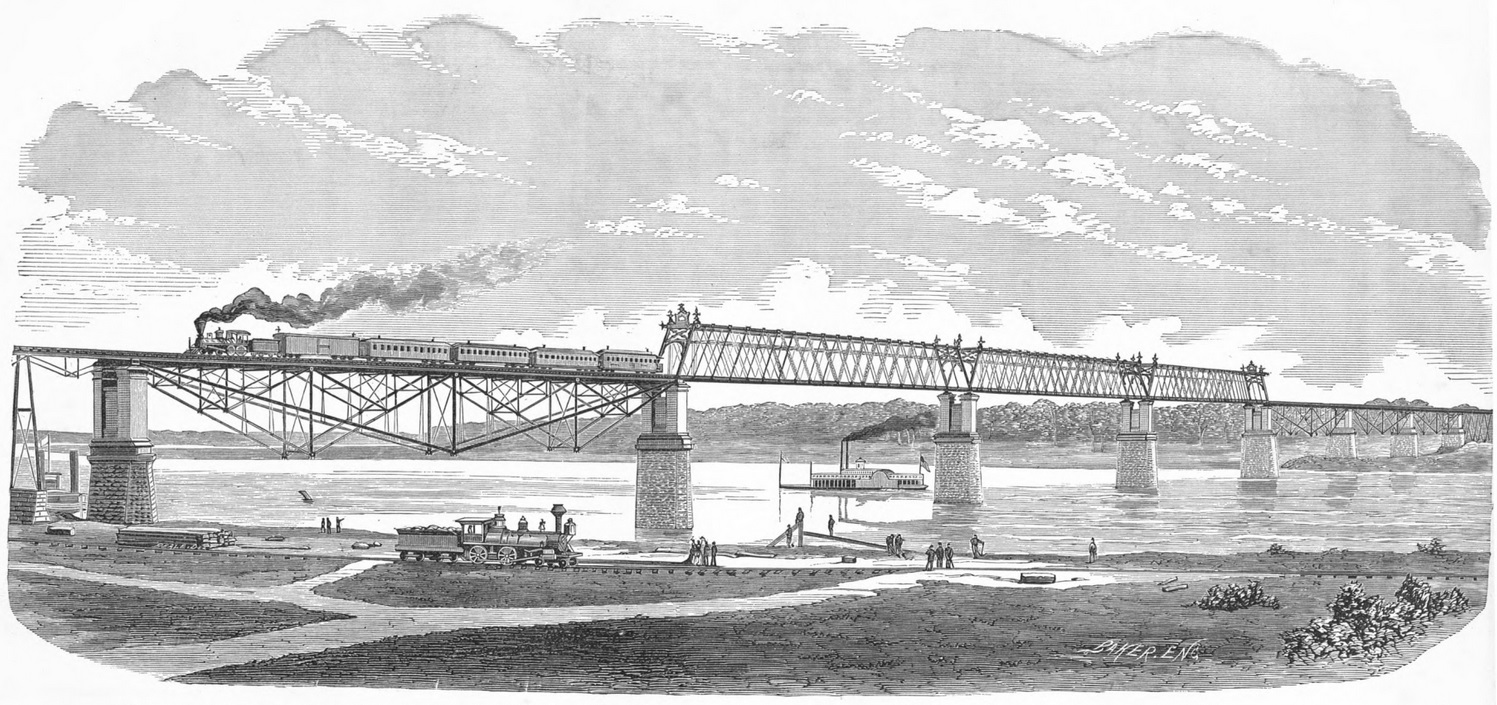
- The St. Charles Bridge over the Missouri

Overview
- Dates of operation: 1851–1872
- Successor: St. Louis, Kansas City and Northern Railway

Technical
- Track gauge: 4 ft 8 1/2 in (1,435 mm)
- Previous gauge: 5 ft 6 in (1,676 mm)
- Length: 353 miles (568 km)

The North Missouri Railroad was a railway company that operated in the states of Missouri and Iowa in the mid-19th century. Incorporated in 1851, at its peak it owned or leased nearly 500 miles (800 km) of track. It was reorganized as the St. Louis, Kansas City and Northern Railway, a forerunner of the Wabash Railroad, in 1872.

== History ==
=== St. Louis–Ottumwa ===
The North Missouri Railroad was incorporated on March 3, 1851. Construction commenced in 1854, with the company building westward from St. Louis, Missouri. The first segment, 19 miles (31 km) from St. Louis to the east bank of the Missouri River opposite St. Charles, Missouri, opened on August 2, 1855. The railroad was built to a 5 ft 6 in (1,676 mm) broad gauge. The line reached Macon, Missouri, in 1859, 172 miles (277 km) from St. Louis. At Macon, the company interchanged with the standard gauge Hannibal and St. Joseph Railroad.

The American Civil War broke out on April 12, 1861. Missouri, a border state, was the site of intense warfare for the next four years. Isaac H. Sturgeon, president of the North Missouri Railroad, required railroad employees to swear a loyalty oath to the Union, and the railroad transported Union soldiers during the war. The railroad was damaged repeatedly during the war the site of several battles, including the Centralia Massacre, in which two dozen unarmed Union soldiers traveling aboard a North Missouri Railroad train were executed by Confederate guerilla force led by William T. Anderson.

Following the conclusion of the American Civil War in 1865, the company resumed expansion. In 1867, the company converted its broad gauge line to standard gauge. Another major effort was the bridging of the Missouri River at St. Charles and eliminating the ferry service there. Begun in 1868, the bridge (later replaced by the Wabash Bridge) was opened on May 29, 1871. The company extended its main line from Macon to Coatsville, Missouri, on the Iowa border. This 65-mile (105 km) extension opened at the end of 1868.

The North Missouri leased the St. Louis and Cedar Rapids Railway, an Iowa company, in 1868. The company completed a line between Coatsville and Ottumwa, Iowa, in 1870. At Ottumwa they interchanged with the Burlington and Missouri River Railroad, a forerunner of the Chicago, Burlington and Quincy Railroad.

The Norfolk and Western Railway, successor to the Wabash, abandoned the northern end of the line between Ottumwa and Moulton, Iowa, in 1982.

=== Moberly–Kansas City ===
Separately, the company began building a new branch from Moberly, Missouri westward towards Kansas City, Missouri. (Note: Poor writes that the Missouri Valley Railroad built the initial line from Moberly to Brunswick in 1857. Moberly was not founded until 1866, and Grant writes that the Missouri Valley Railroad was "stillborn.") The line was completed to Brunswick, Missouri, at the end of 1867, and to Birmingham, Missouri (near Kansas City) and a junction with the Hannibal and St. Joseph Railroad in 1868. From Birmingham, the North Missouri operated over the Kansas City and Cameron Railroad to North Kansas City, Missouri. Access to Kansas City proper followed in 1869 when the Hannibal and St. Joseph Railroad completed the Hannibal Bridge over the Missouri River.

=== Brunswick–Pattonsburg ===
The company also leased several lines with the goal of establishing its own route to Omaha, Nebraska. In 1867 it leased the Chillicothe and Brunswick Railroad, (Note: Reorganized in 1873 as the Brunswick and Chillicothe Railroad.) which was building a line from Brunswick northwest to Chillicothe, Missouri. This line opened in 1871. In 1871, the North Missouri leased the St. Louis, Council Bluffs and Omaha Railroad, which owned a line between Chillicothe and Pattonsburg, Missouri.

=== Centralia–Columbia ===
The North Missouri leased the Boone County and Jefferson City Railroad in 1866, and through that company constructed a branch line from Centralia, Missouri, to Columbia, Missouri. This 22-mile (35 km) branch opened in 1867. Columbia acquired the branch from the Norfolk Southern Railway in 1987 and it is operated by the Columbia Terminal Railroad.

=== Bankruptcy ===
The North Missouri Railroad entered bankruptcy in 1871 and was sold to Morris Ketchum Jesup, who reorganized it as the St. Louis, Kansas City and Northern Railway in 1872. At the time of reorganization the company owned 353 miles (568 km) of track and leased a further 143 miles (230 km).
