= McCain Furniture Store =

- McCain Furniture Store building
- U.S. National Register of Historic Places
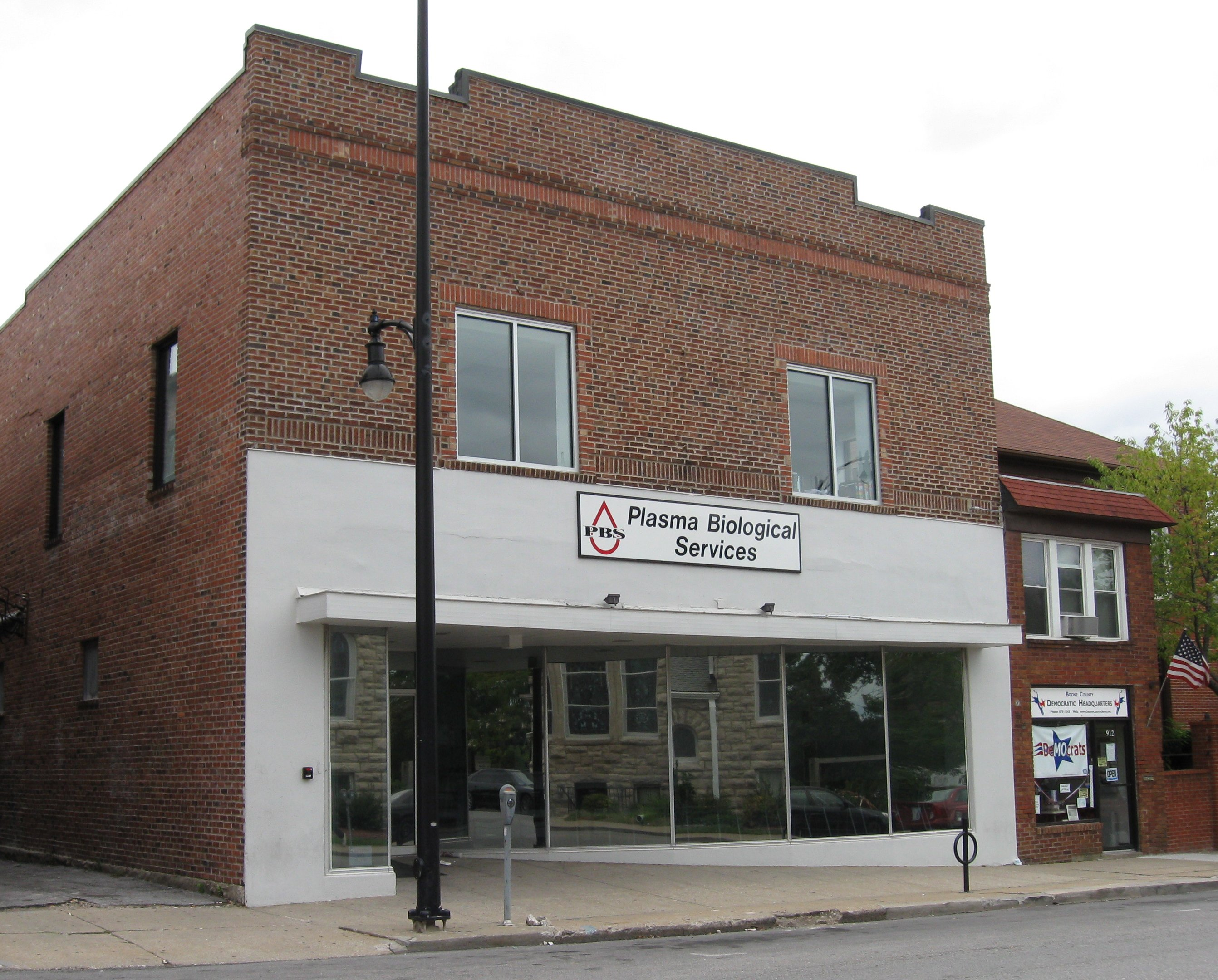

- Location within Missouri Location within the United States
- Location: 916 E. Walnut, Columbia, Missouri
- Coordinates: 38°57′8.6″N 92°19′37″W
- Area: less than one acre
- Built: c. 1930
- Architect: Knipp, Richard
- Architectural style: Two-Part Commercial Block
- MPS: Downtown Columbia, Missouri MPS
- NRHP reference No.: 05000890
- Added to NRHP: August 17, 2005

The McCain Furniture Store Building is a historic commercial building located in downtown Columbia, Missouri. It was built about 1930 for the S. H. Kress & Co., and remodeled in 1951. It is a two-story, brick building with a simple stepped parapet. Though it has hosted a variety of businesses since the closing of the original store, today it holds Plasma Biological Services.

It was listed on the National Register of Historic Places in 2005. It is located in the North Village Arts District.
