= Central Dairy Building =

- U.S. National Register of Historic Places
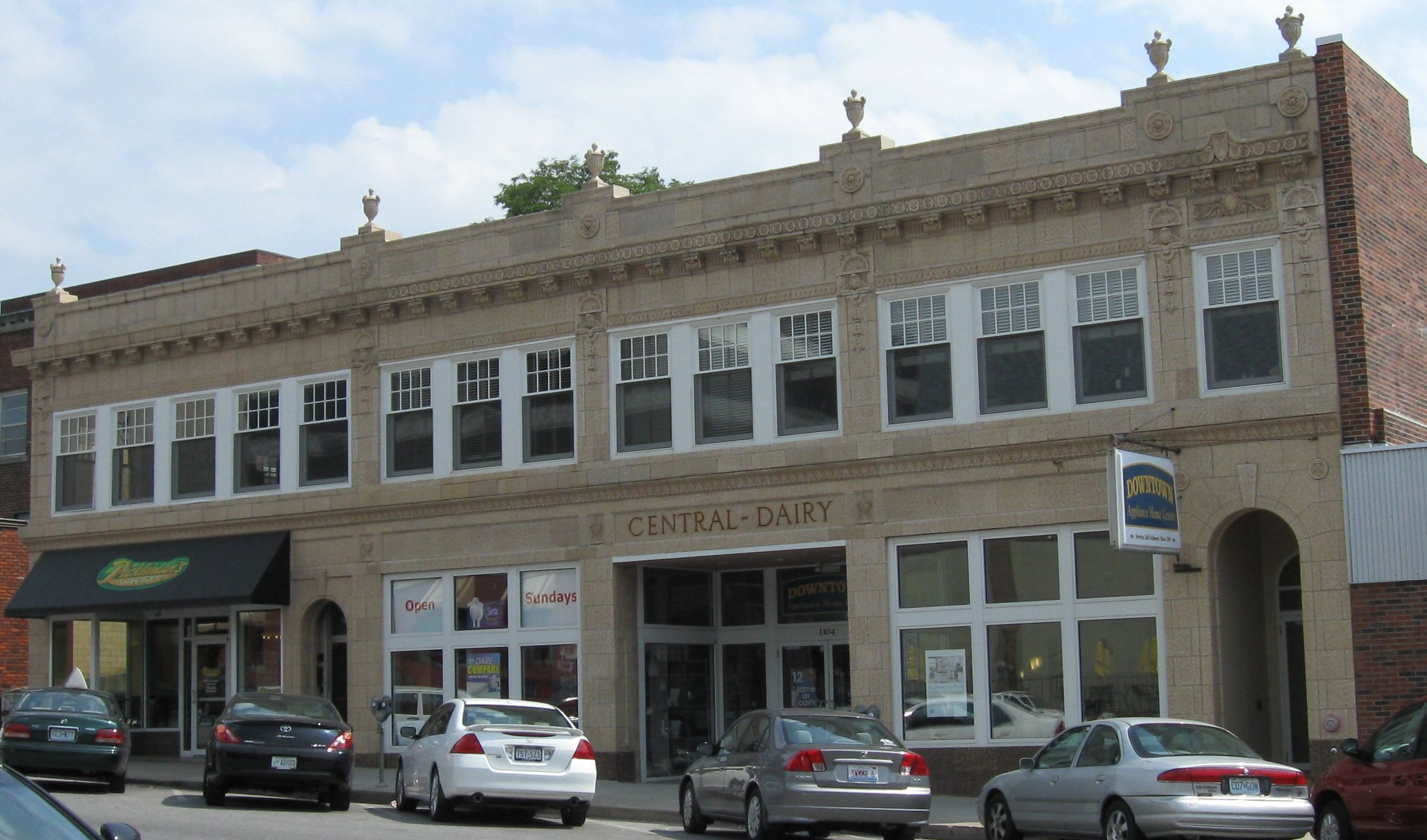

- Location within Missouri Location within the United States
- Location: 1104-1106 East Broadway, Columbia, Missouri
- Coordinates: 38°57′4.6″N 92°19′30″W
- Area: less than one acre
- Built: 1927, 1940
- Architect: Shepard and Wiser; Trout, Charles
- Architectural style: Late 19th And 20th Century Revivals
- MPS: Downtown Columbia, Missouri MPS
- NRHP reference No.: 04001519
- Added to NRHP: January 20, 2005

The Central Dairy Building, also known as Downtown Appliance and Gunther's Games, is a historic commercial building located in downtown Columbia, Missouri. It was built in 1927, and enlarged to its present size in 1940. It is a two-story brick building with terra cotta ornamentation elaborate classical and baroque design motifs. Also on the property is a contributing brick warehouse, constructed about 1940. Today the building houses an appliance store and restaurants on the first floor and lofts on the second.

It was listed on the National Register of Historic Places in 2005.
