= Go COMO =

U.S. public bus system

- Founded: September 20, 1965
- Headquarters: Wabash Station at 126 North Tenth Street
- Locale: Columbia, MO
- Service type: bus service, paratransit
- Daily ridership: Over 2 million passengers annually
- Operator: City of Columbia

Go COMO, formerly Columbia Transit, is a city-owned public bus system that serves the city of Columbia, Missouri. The system operates Monday through Saturday, except on major holidays. Services include fixed-route services, bookings for paratransit shuttles for disabled people, a system of commuter shuttles for students and employees of the University of Missouri, and hotel shuttles (known as the "Spirit Shuttle") during MU football games. In fiscal year 2009, a total of 2,007,263 rides were logged along the system's six fixed routes and University of Missouri Shuttle routes, while the latest available records show 27,000 rides logged aboard the paratransit service.

== History ==
Columbia Transit officially changed its name to Go COMO. In June 2019 Go COMO switched to a fixed-route system with six fixed routes and the historical Wabash Station as the hub.

== Routes ==
The main connector routes, 1 Black and 2 Gold, have frequent service and are joined to by feeder routes which run less often, generally circulating in residential neighborhoods.

No.	Color	Type	Notes
1A	Black	Connector	
1B	Black	Connector	
2A	Gold	Connector	
2B	Gold	Connector	
3	Brown	Neighborhood	
4	Orange	Neighborhood	
5	Blue	Neighborhood	
6	Pink	Neighborhood	
7	Dark Green	Neighborhood	
8	Light Green	Neighborhood	
9	Purple	Neighborhood	
10	Red		Downtown orbiter
11	Aqua	Commuter	Limited service commuter route
401		Tiger Line Day	Hearnes Loop (T1)
402		Tiger Line Day	Trowbridge Loop (T2)
403		Tiger Line Day	Reactor Loop RP10 (T3)
404			Tiger Diggs Loop (T4)

== Fare structure ==
Riders of Go COMO's fixed routes or paratransit services have not had to pay fares since March 2020.

== Fleet ==
Go COMO operates a diverse fleet of 41 transit buses, 11 paratransit vans and several support vehicles. Most buses are 35 and 40-foot New Flyer low-floor buses. In addition, the system also uses three 40-foot Gillig Corporation Phantom buses, 30-foot ElDorado National buses, and two Gilling 40-foot Euro-style buses. All fixed-route buses are equipped with bike racks which can carry two standard bicycles. Use of the bike racks is provided at no additional charge.

The City Council decided (in a unanimous vote on November 16, 2009) to approve a measure for transit advertising. The decision came after a five-year debate on the issue, with the threat of budget decreases pushing through the measure. The city received two bids after requesting them in August of that year, with the larger potential-income proposal coming from Midwest-based Transit Advertising (a firm specializing in transit advertisements). The company's bid guaranteed an income of at least $204,000 per year of which Columbia Transit would keep 60%, or $122,400 (whichever was greater). Advertisements vary from small banners inside buses to full bus wrap ads.

== Evolution ==
In recent years, the Columbia Transit system has undergone several changes to service and infrastructure. During this time, ridership levels for the fixed-route system have grown from around 400,000 passengers in 2003 to over two million riders per year. In 2004, City Council approved motions for the renovation and expansion of Wabash Station in downtown Columbia; federal funding was approved for construction. In June 2004, many changes were made to the primary routes in an effort to reduce headway times (which had continued to grow because of traffic congestion). Changes were made to the 4-Red, 3-Green and 2-Blue routes; the 5-Yellow route was reduced (due to poor ridership) from a peak-service commuter route along Forum Boulevard to a one-morning/one-afternoon weekday run, with a transfer to the 1-Orange. While no trolley buses were purchased, due to strong popular support the 6-Brown Downtown Orbiter was introduced along with the 7-Purple Theater Special, a route running from Forum 8 Goodrich Theater to Hollywood Stadium 14 Theater with a transfer to the 6-Brown at University Hospital, roughly halfway between the two theaters. In June, 2006, the FASTPass electronic fare card program was introduced along with electronic transfer slips. Other changes during that month had the 6-Brown's extended at-peak service removed Thursday evenings, and the 7-Purple was rerouted to the Wabash Station to encourage ridership. In August of that year, the 8-Gold route was introduced to the university system. The 8-Gold service area includes Campus View, the Reserve and several other student-housing complexes. At the time the route was partially funded by the owners of those complexes, although the university later contributed operating funds. This route has since grown into three different routes (now routes 207 and 208W/E), and are key components of the university's shuttle system.

In June 2007, a $2.3 million renovation and expansion of the Wabash bus station on North Tenth Street began after nearly a decade of planning. The building has been on the National Register of Historic Places since 1979, so construction had to retain the building's historic quality. The project included exterior renovation of the original structure, remodeling of the interior and passenger lobby, construction of an administrative wing and a large canopy-covered bus port extending into the rear lot. As part of the "percent for art" program, one percent of the total construction cost was dedicated to artwork primarily by local artists. Two Boone County artists, painter David Spear and sculptor Don Asbee, created large oil paintings of the former and current station for the lobby and a metal train sculpture underneath the bus port. The project was completed by summer 2008.
