= Downtown Columbia, Missouri =

- Downtown Columbia Historic District
- U.S. National Register of Historic Places
- U.S. Historic district
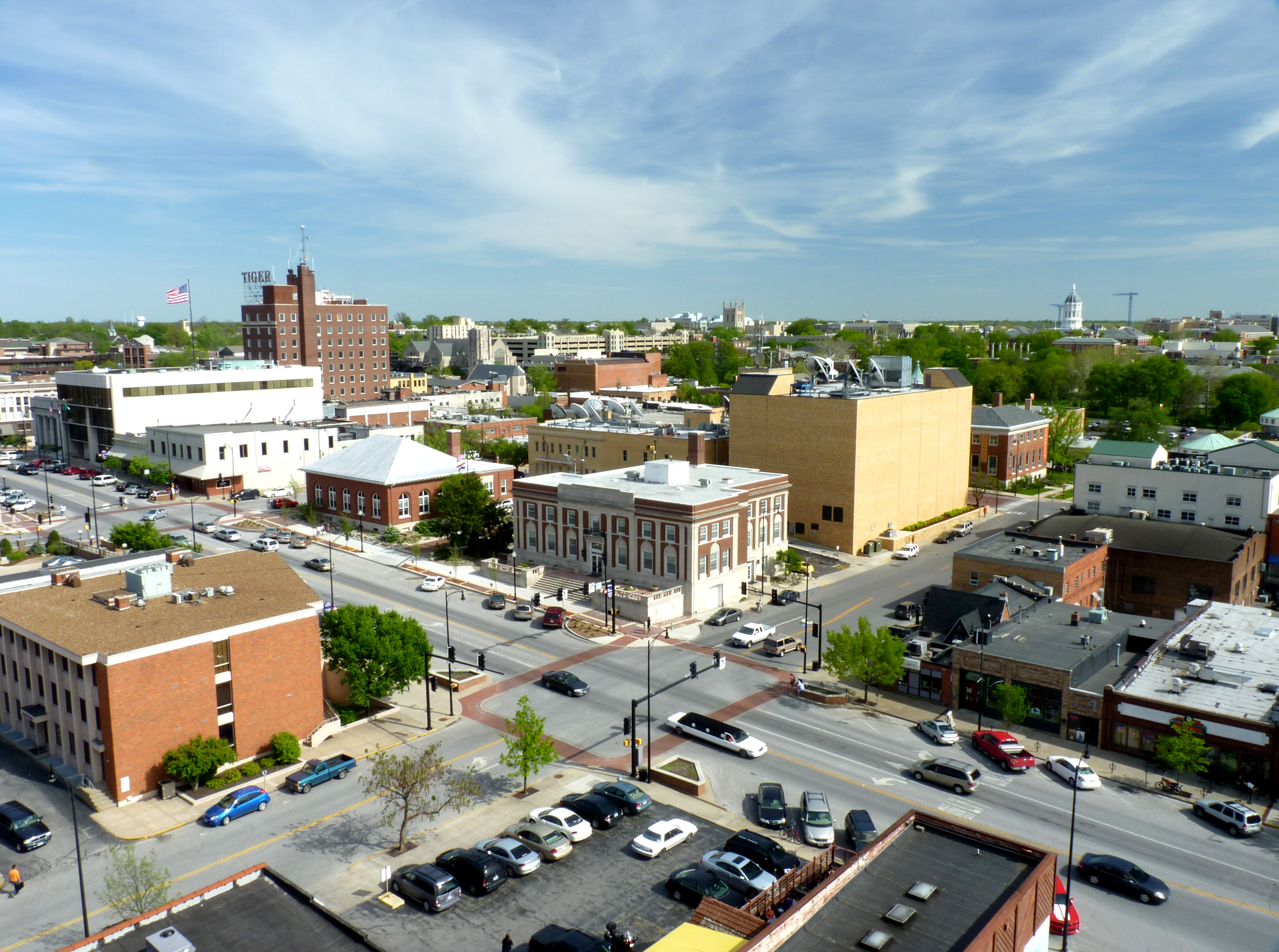

- Location within Missouri Location within the United States
- Location: Parts of 7th, 8th, 9th, 10th, E. Broadway, Cherry, Hitt, Locust, and E. Walnut Sts.; also 1019, 1020, 1023, and 1025-33 E. Walnut St., Columbia, Missouri
- Coordinates: 38°57′5″N 92°19′39″W
- Area: 28 acres (11 ha)
- Architect: Torbitt, A.N.; Eckle, Edmund
- Architectural style: Classical Revival, Beaux Arts, et al.
- MPS: Downtown Columbia, Missouri MPS
- NRHP reference No.: 06000990, 08000375
- Added to NRHP: November 8, 2006, May 8, 2008

Downtown Columbia is the central business, government, and social core of Columbia, Missouri and the Columbia Metropolitan Area. Three colleges — the University of Missouri, Stephens College, and Columbia College — all border the area. Downtown Columbia is an area of approximately one square mile surrounded by the University of Missouri on the south, Stephens College to the east, and Columbia College on the north. The area serves as Columbia's financial and business district and is the topic of a large initiative to draw tourism, which includes plans to capitalize on the area's historic architecture and Bohemian characteristics. The downtown skyline is relatively low and is dominated by the 10-story Tiger Hotel, built in 1928, and the 15-story Paquin Tower.

Downtown Columbia Historic District, listed on the National Register of Historic Places, covers much of the downtown area. This historic district was created in 2006, following the removal of concrete awnings. It was expanded in 2008.

On the northeast side of Downtown is the North Village Arts District. The Flat Branch of Hinkson Creek runs through downtown. Peace Park is located on Elm Street.

== Gallery ==
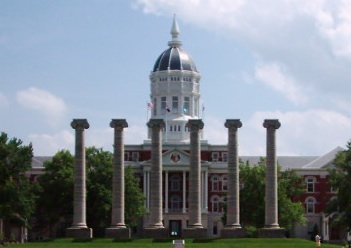
Jesse Hall and the columns on Francis Quadrangle

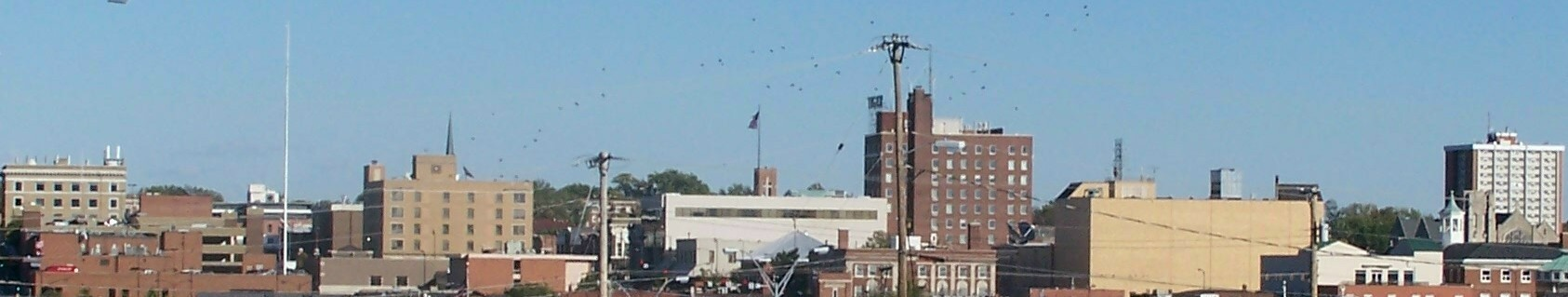
The Downtown Skyline in 2007

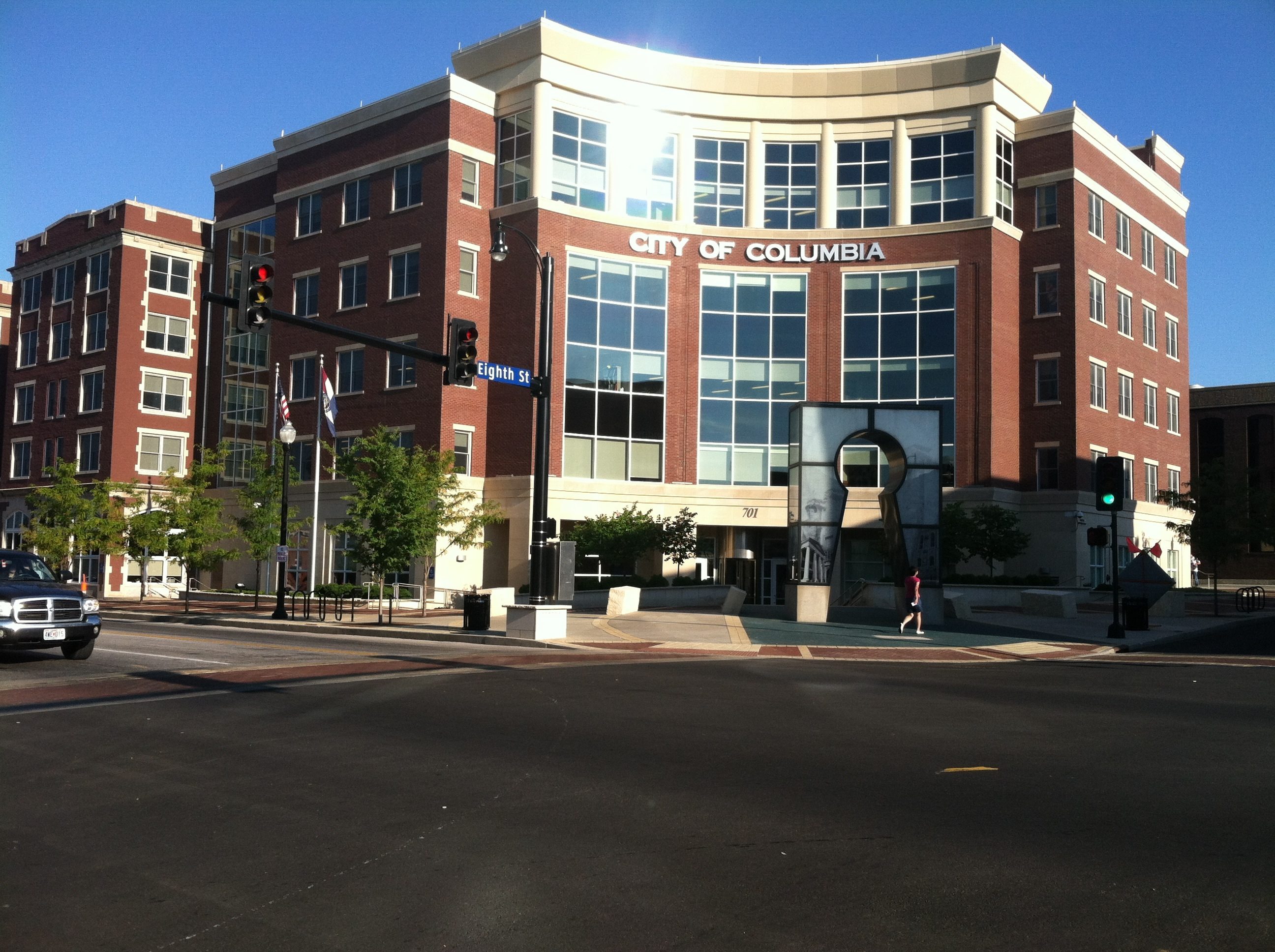
Columbia City Hall

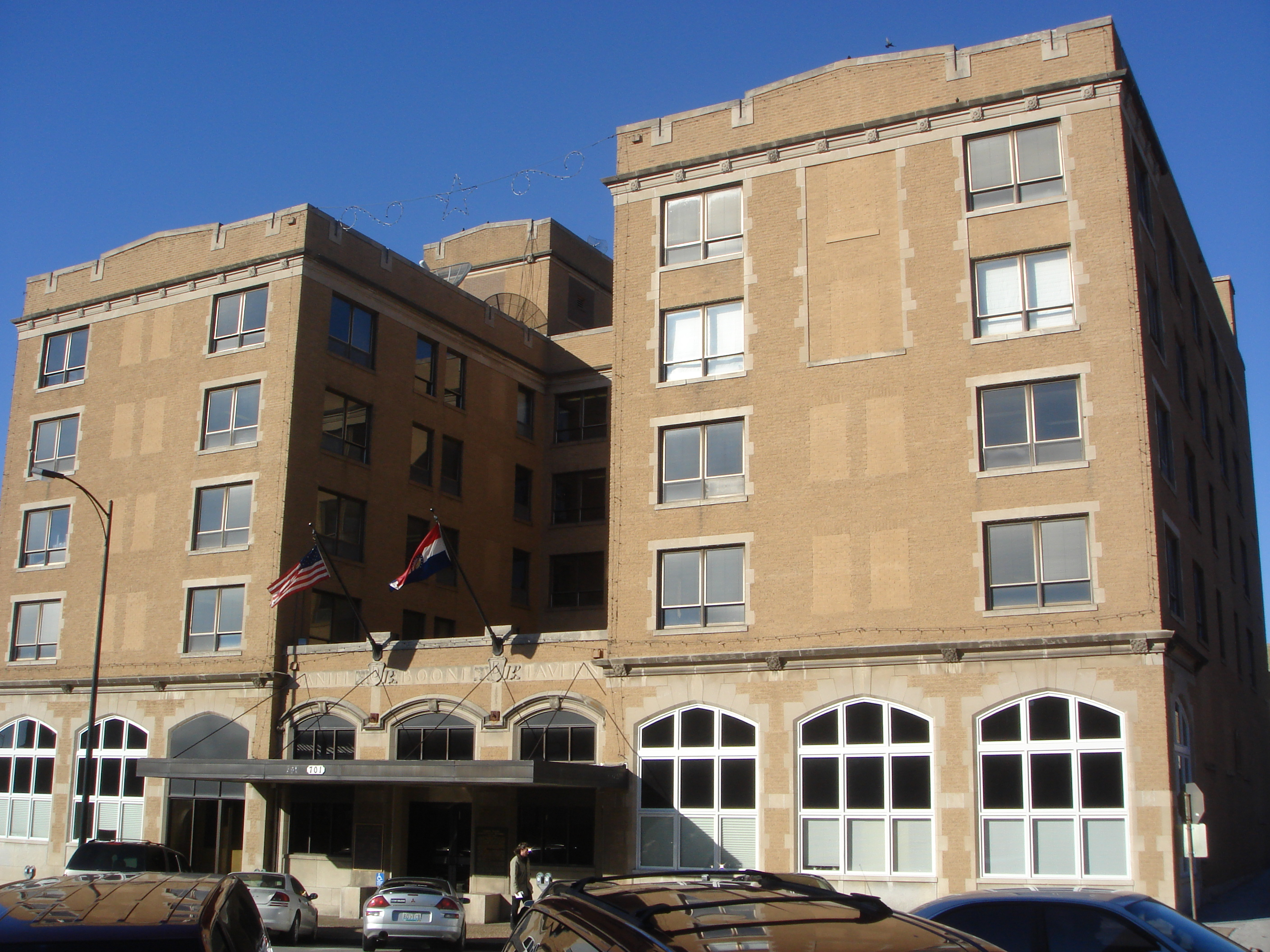
Columbia City Hall before renovation

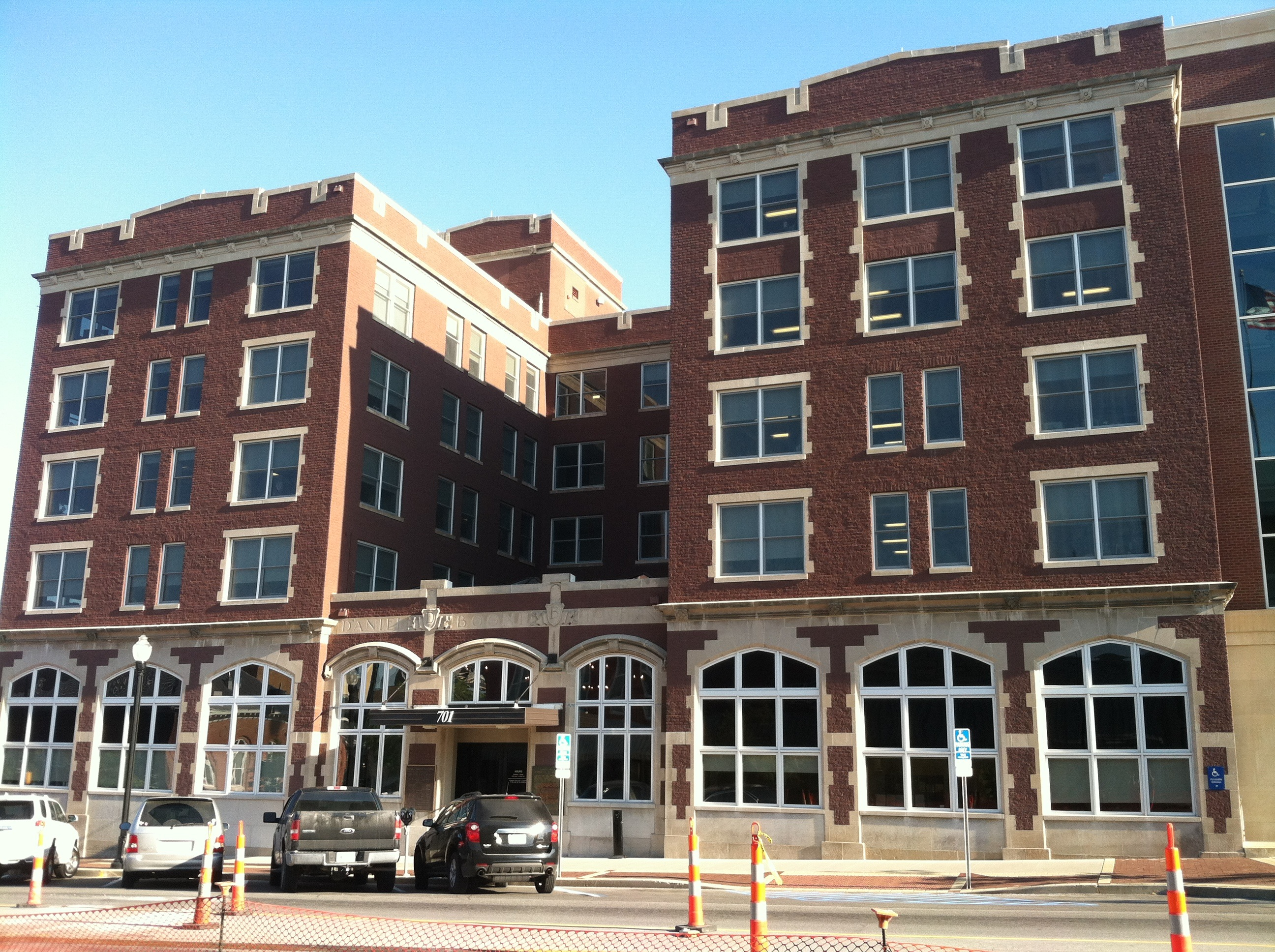
The 1917 structure of the Columbia City Hall restored

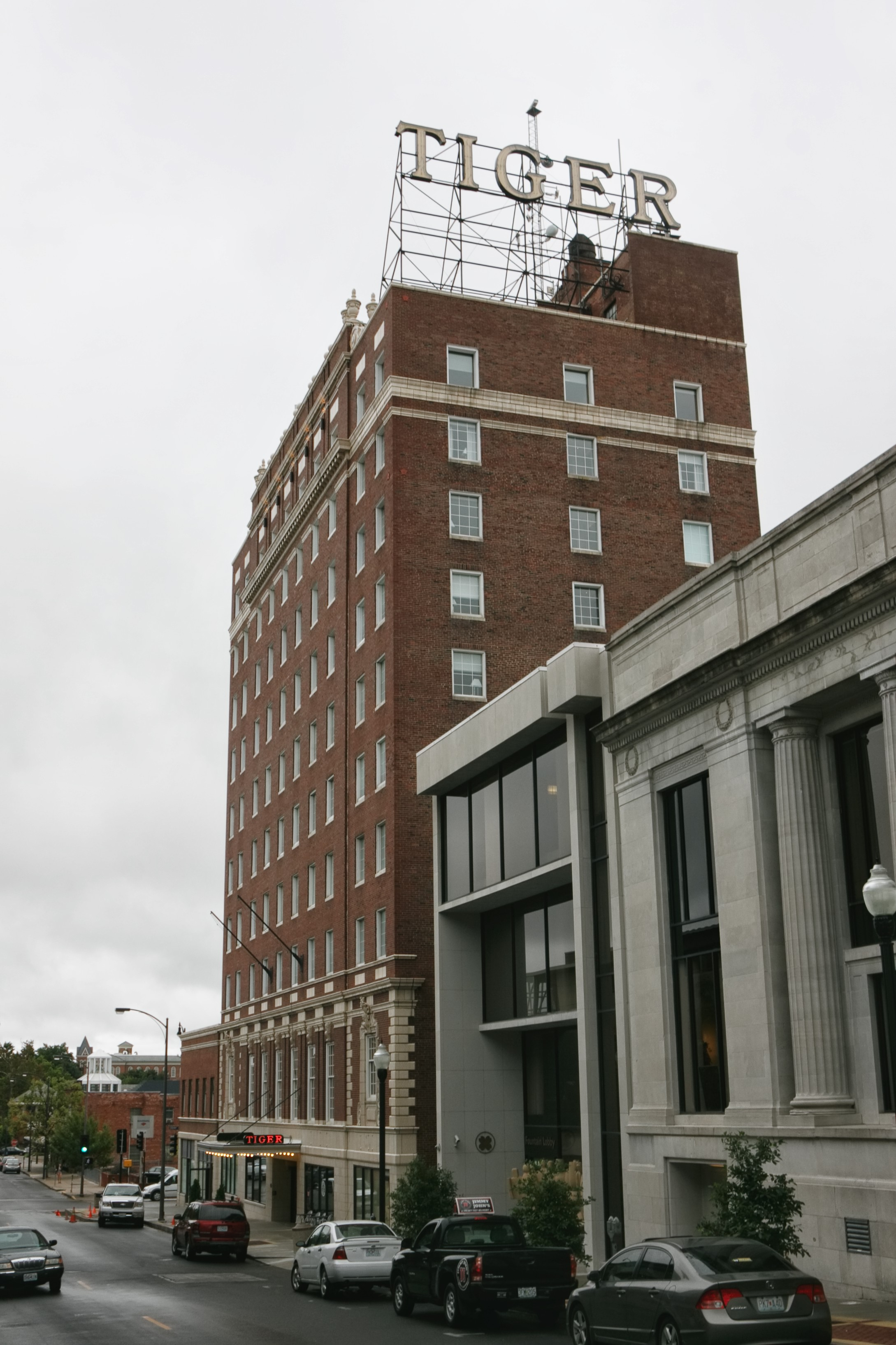
Tiger Hotel

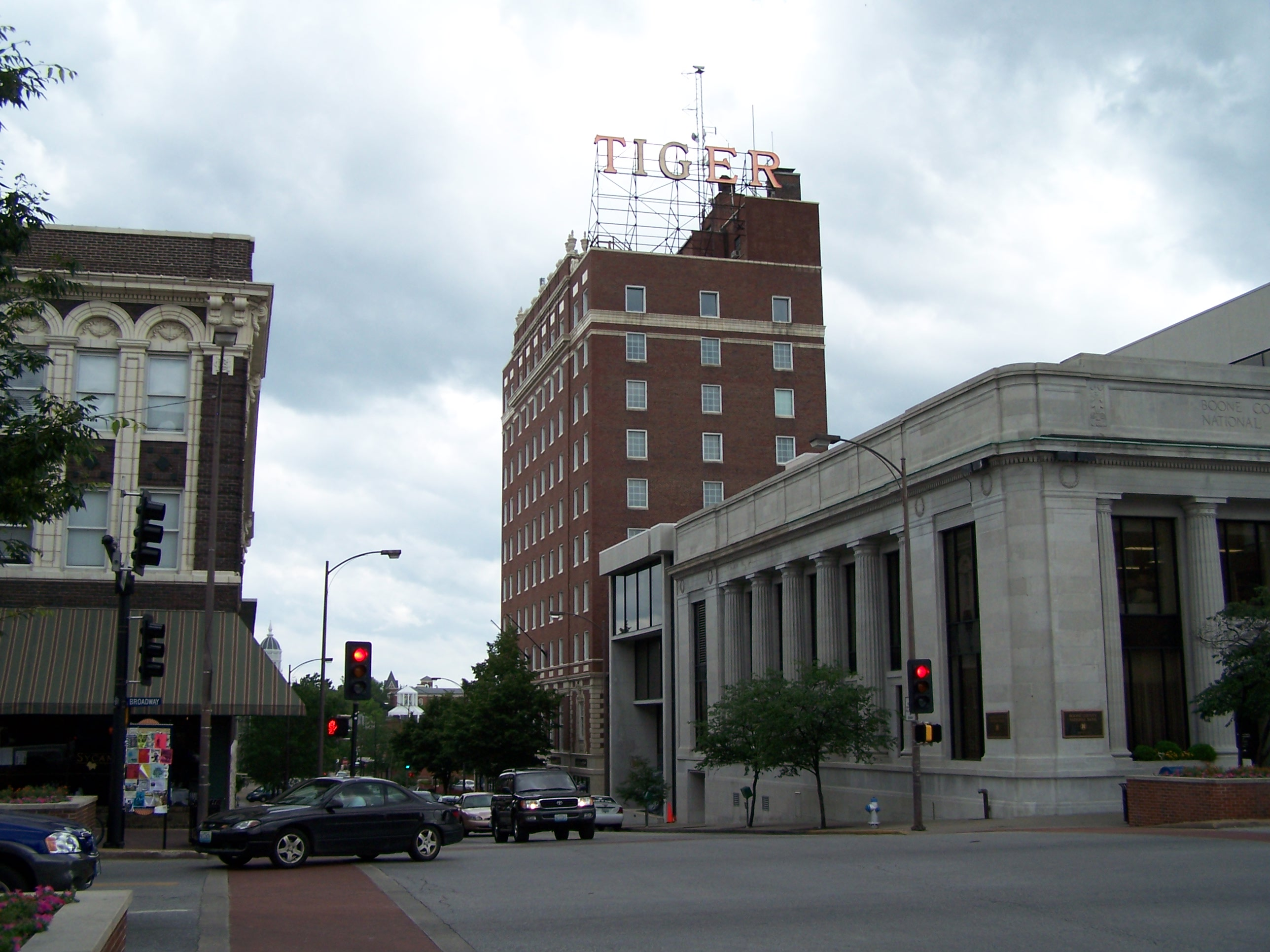
Downtown Columbia

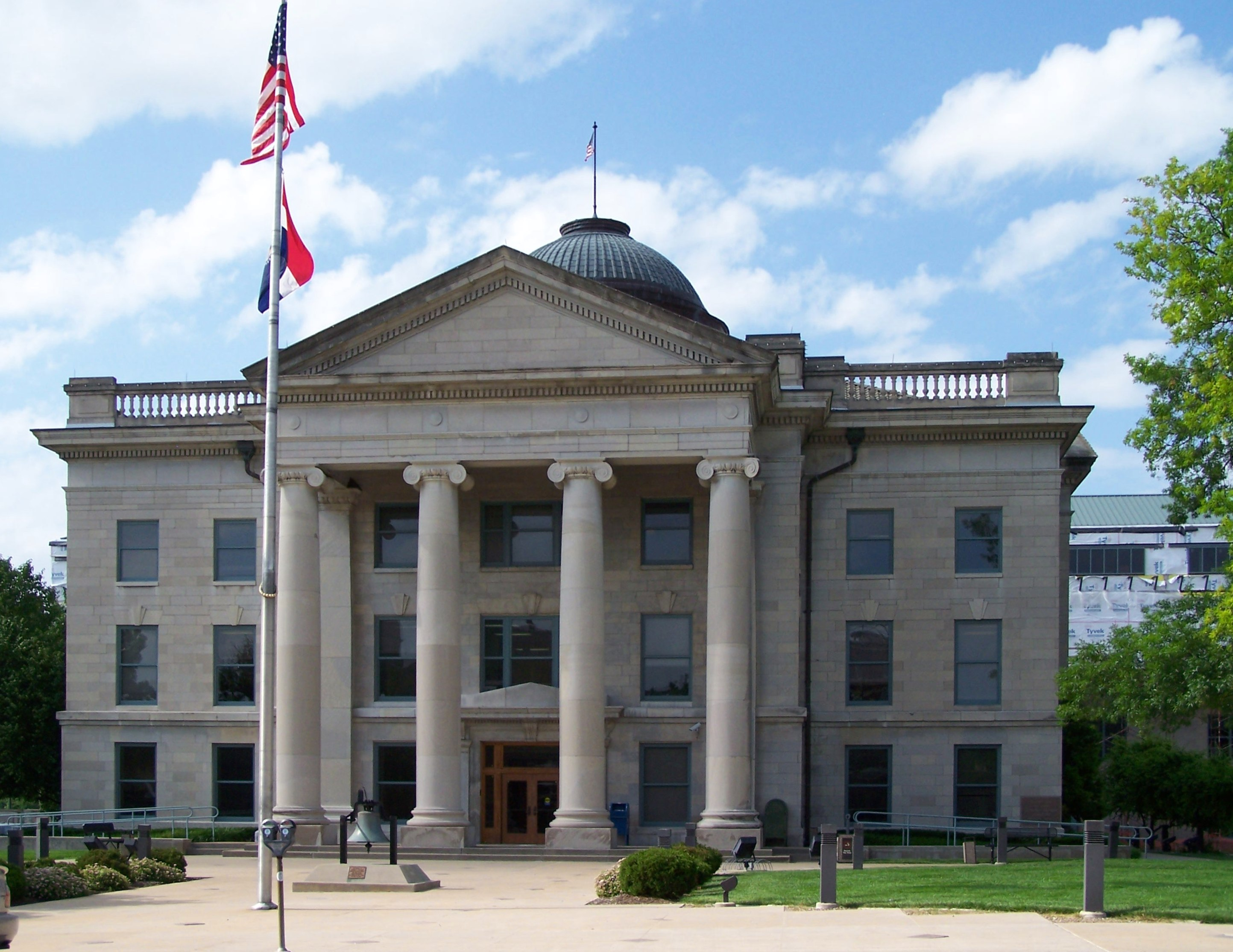
Boone County Courthouse

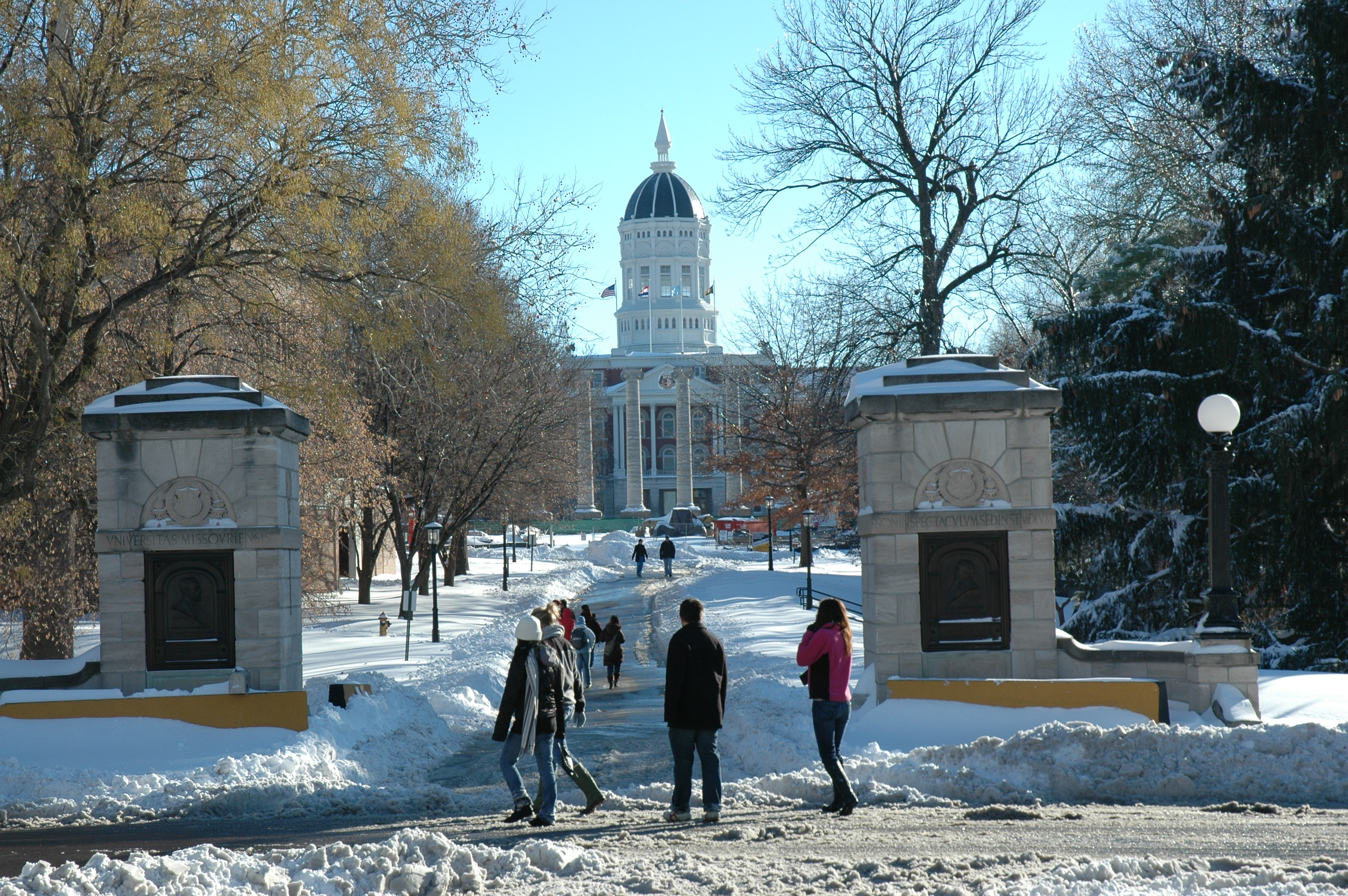
Jesse Hall seen from the Avenue of the Columns

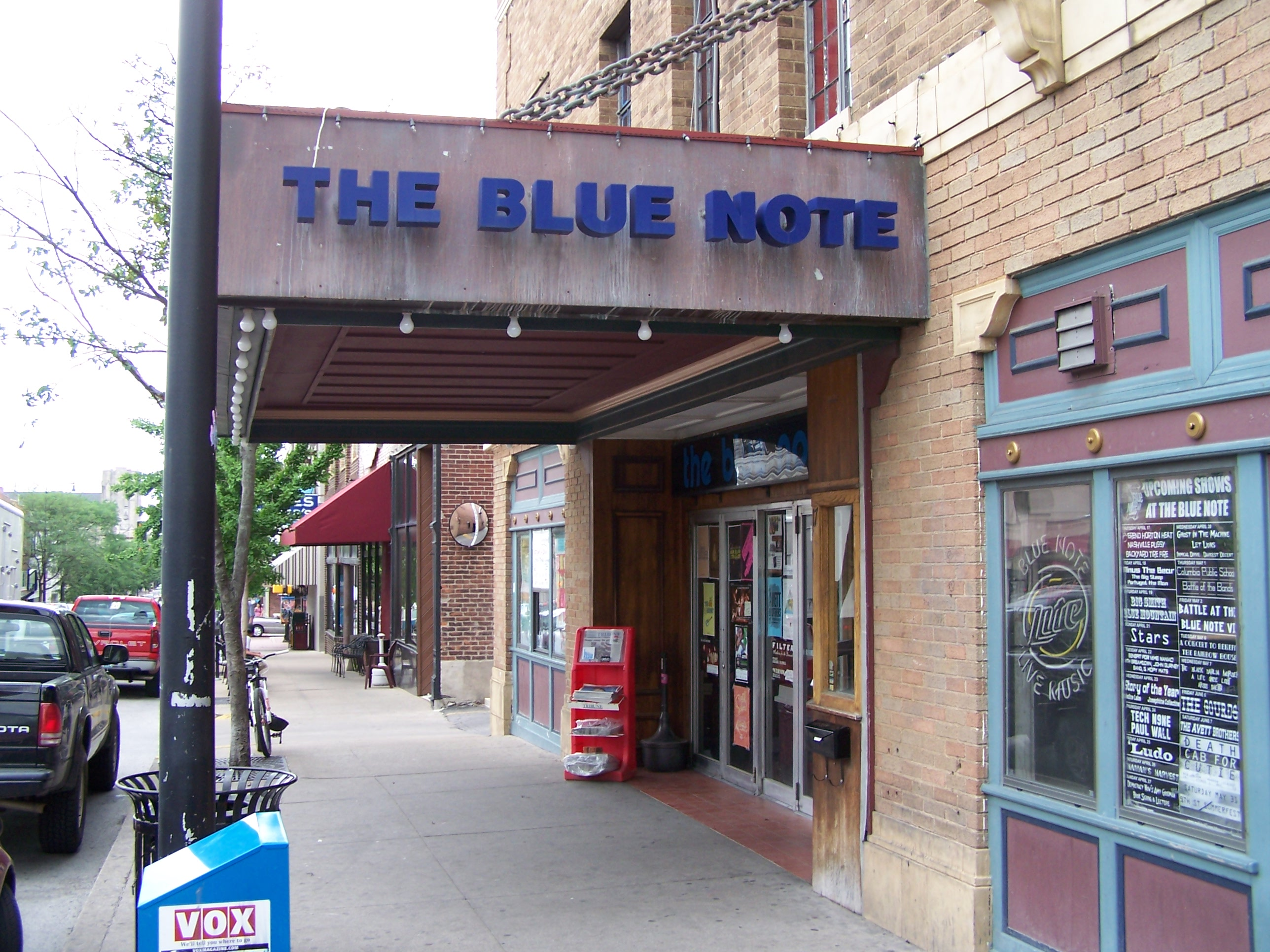
The Blue Note

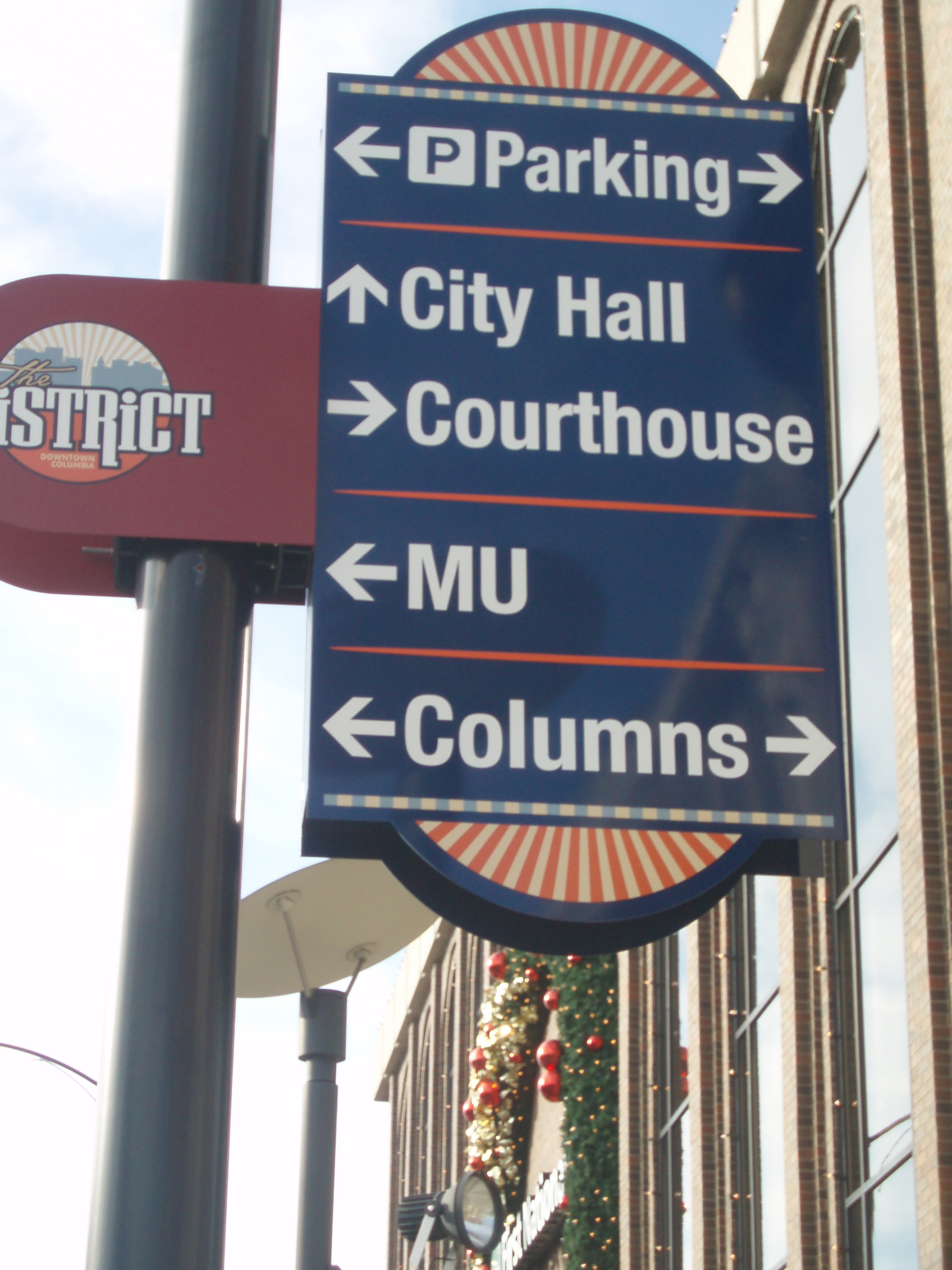
Directions sign in Downtown Columbia, known as The District

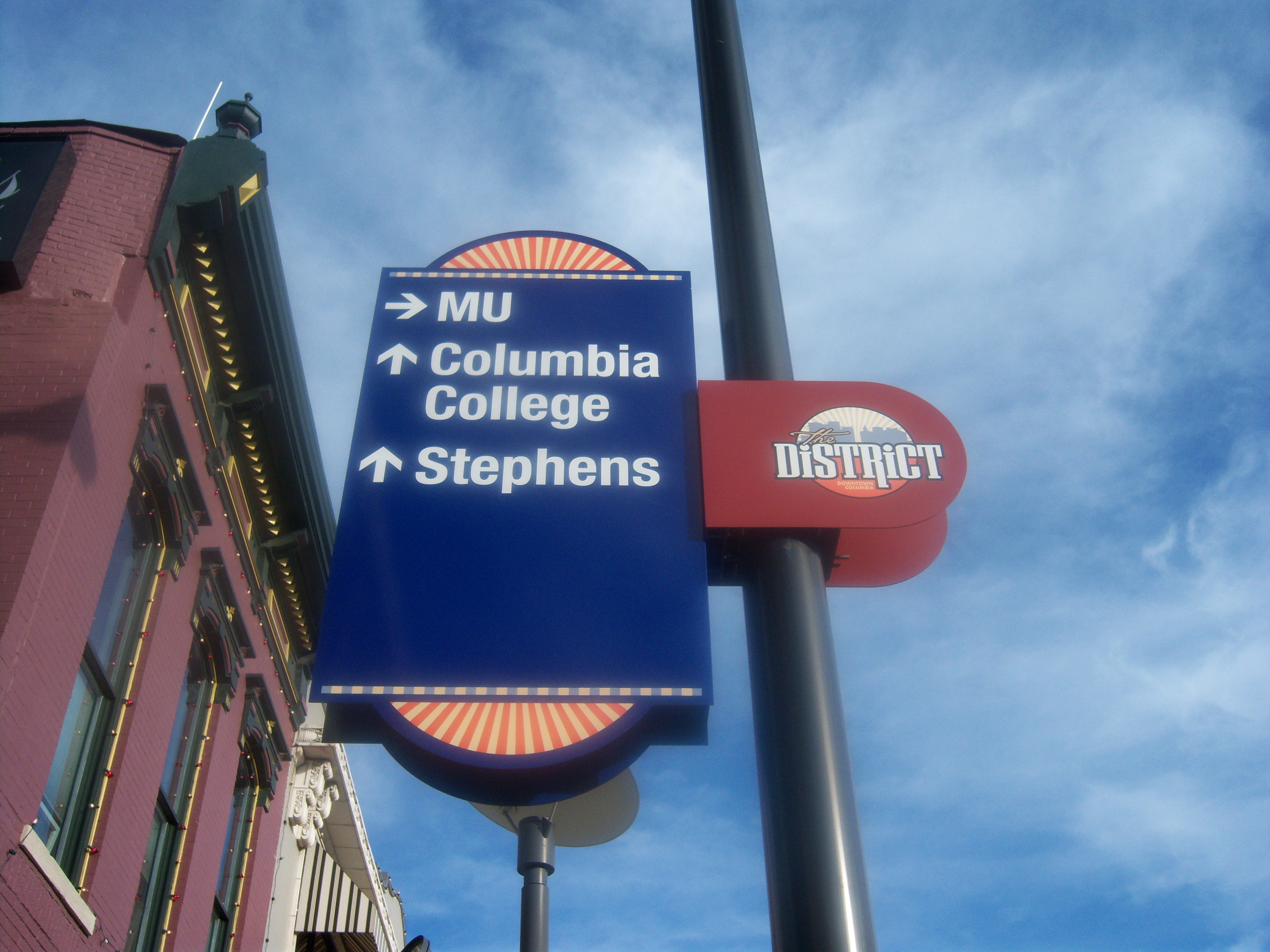
Directions sign in Columbia's downtown area known as The District. This one shows the three local Colleges.

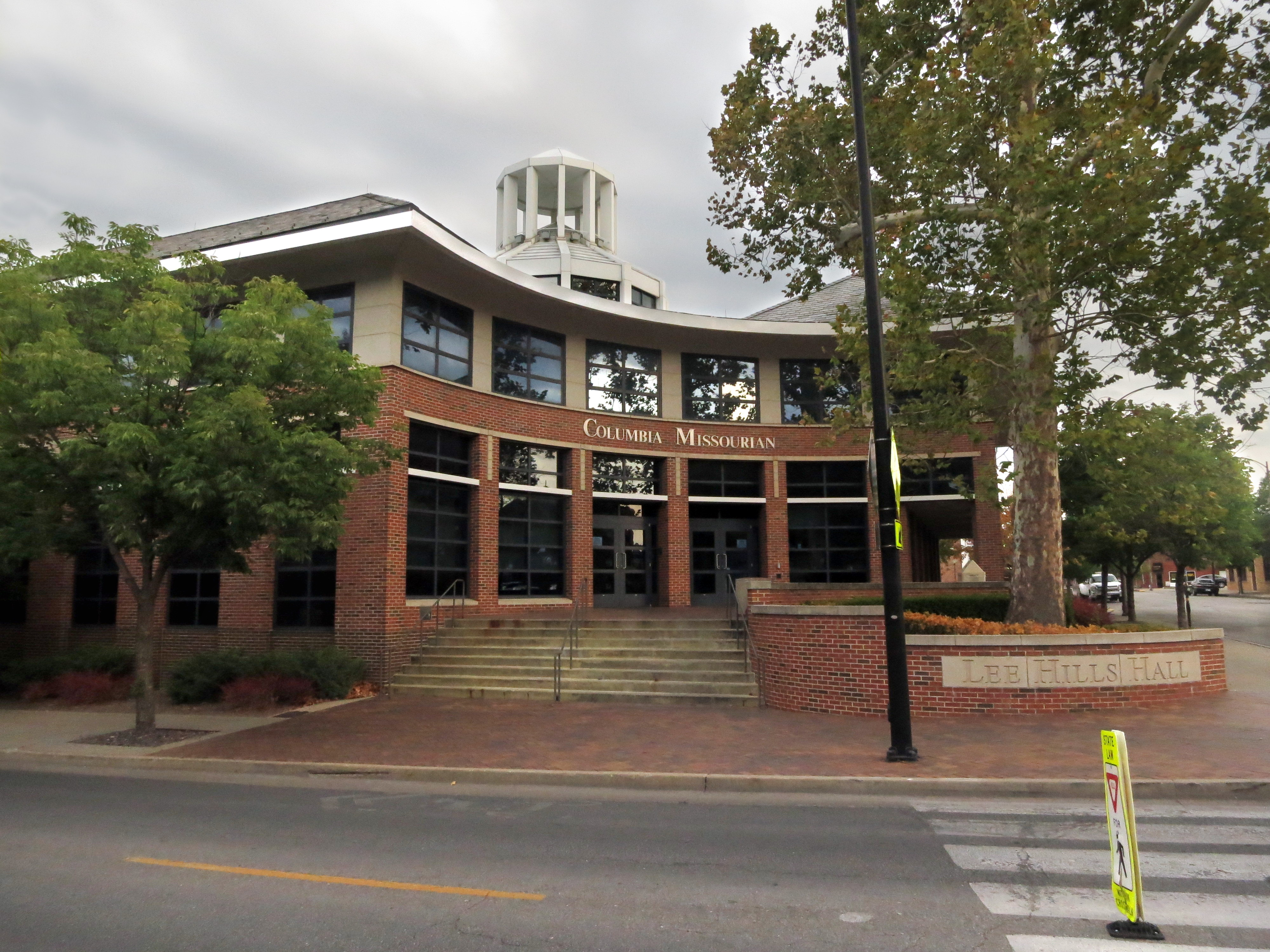
Headquarters of the Columbia Missourian

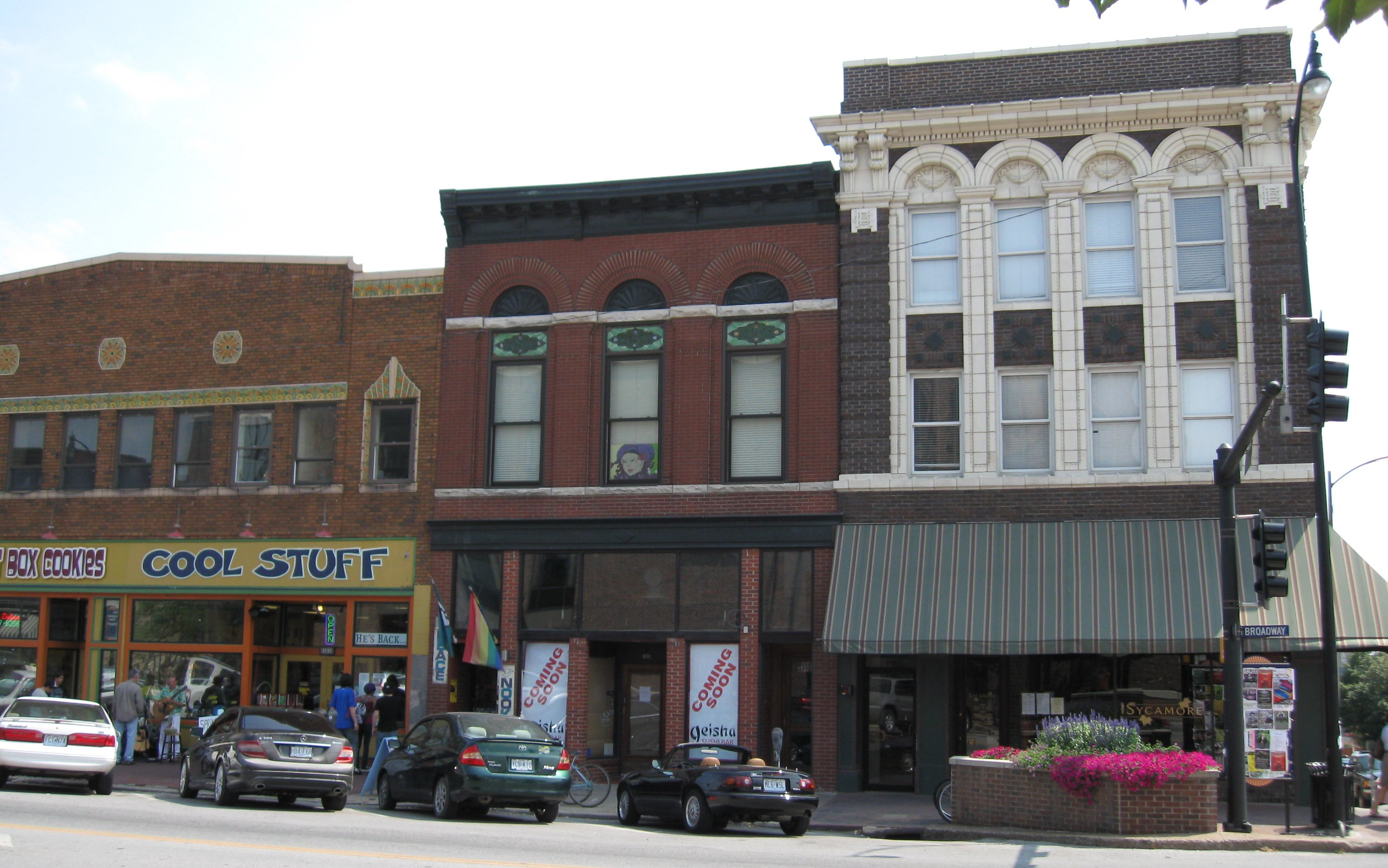
Eighth and Broadway Historic District

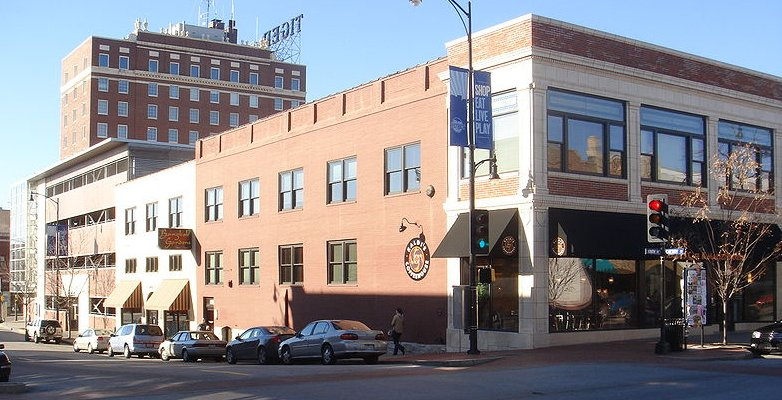
Ballenger Building at Cherry and 9th Streets

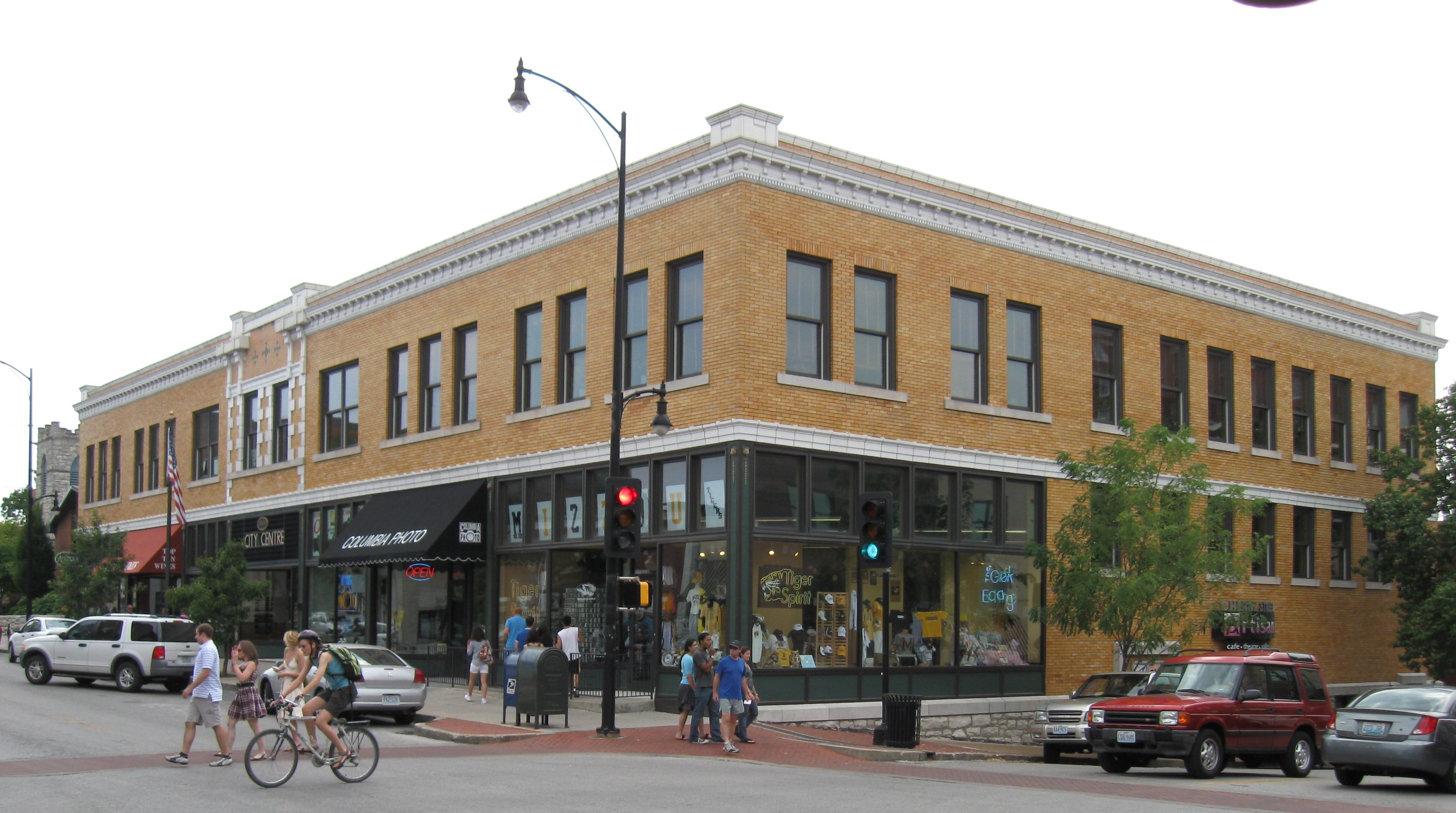
Virginia Building

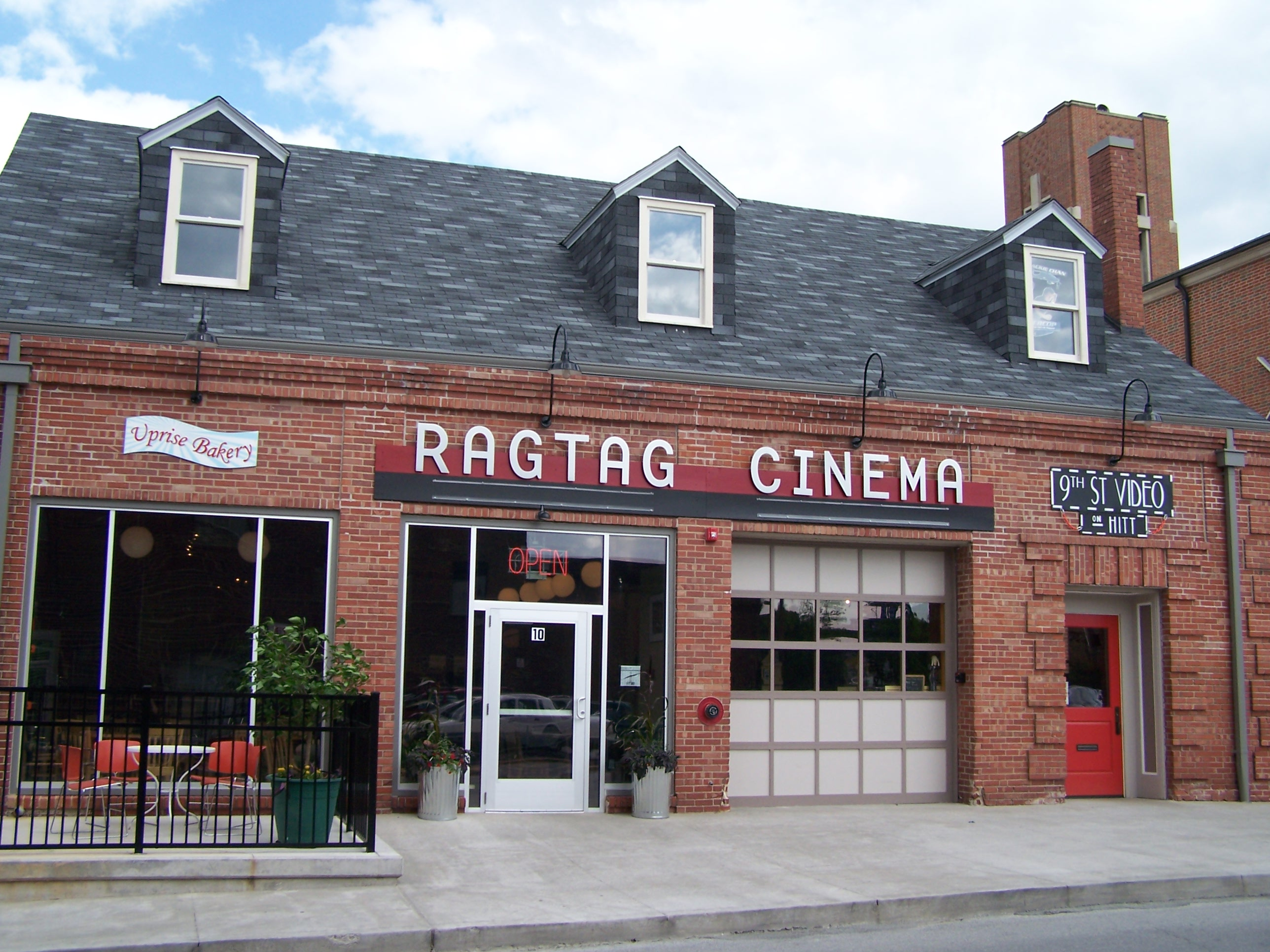
Coca-Cola Bottling Company Building on Hitt Street. Now houses the Ragtag Cinema

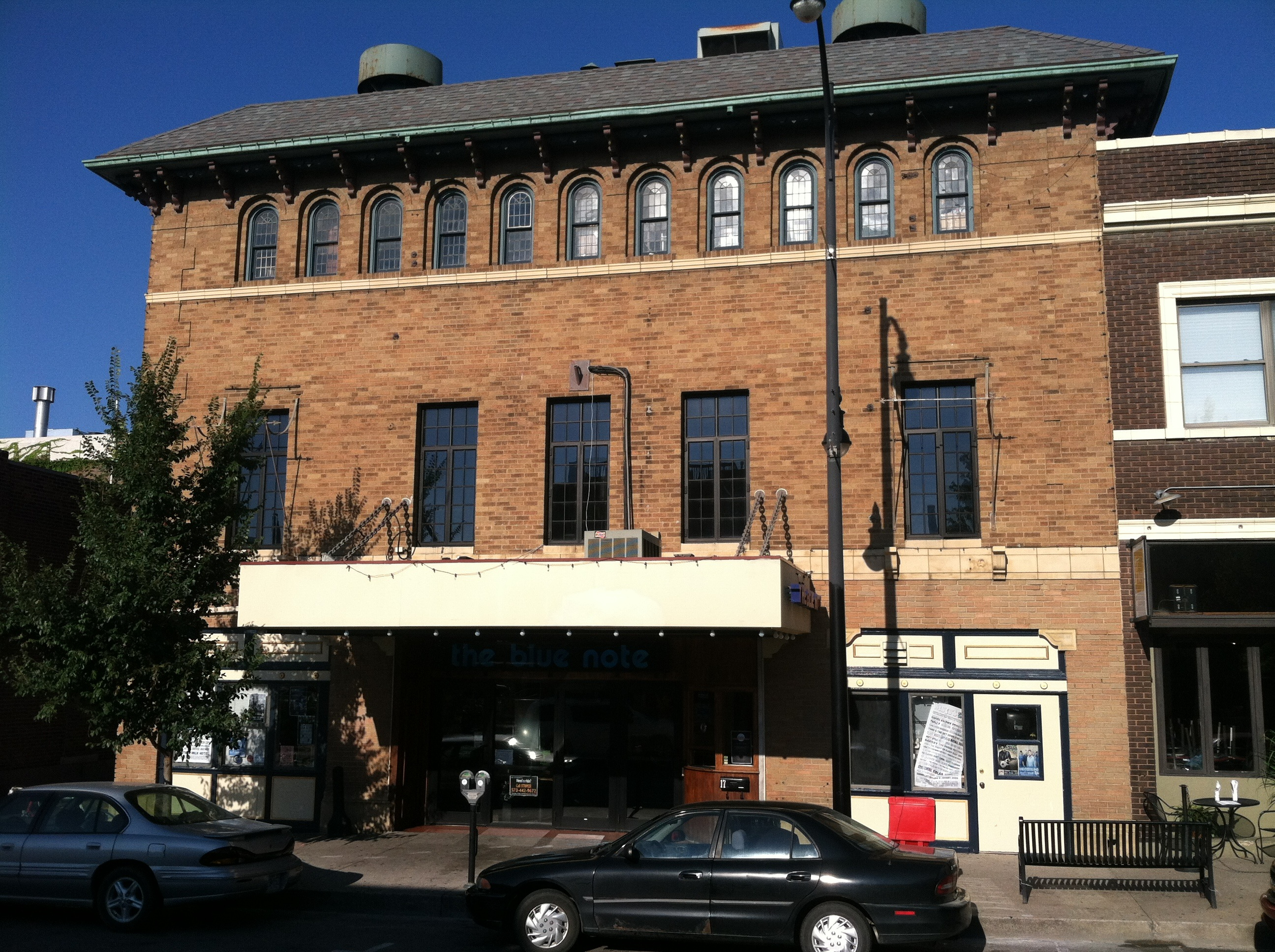
The Blue Note as seen from the front

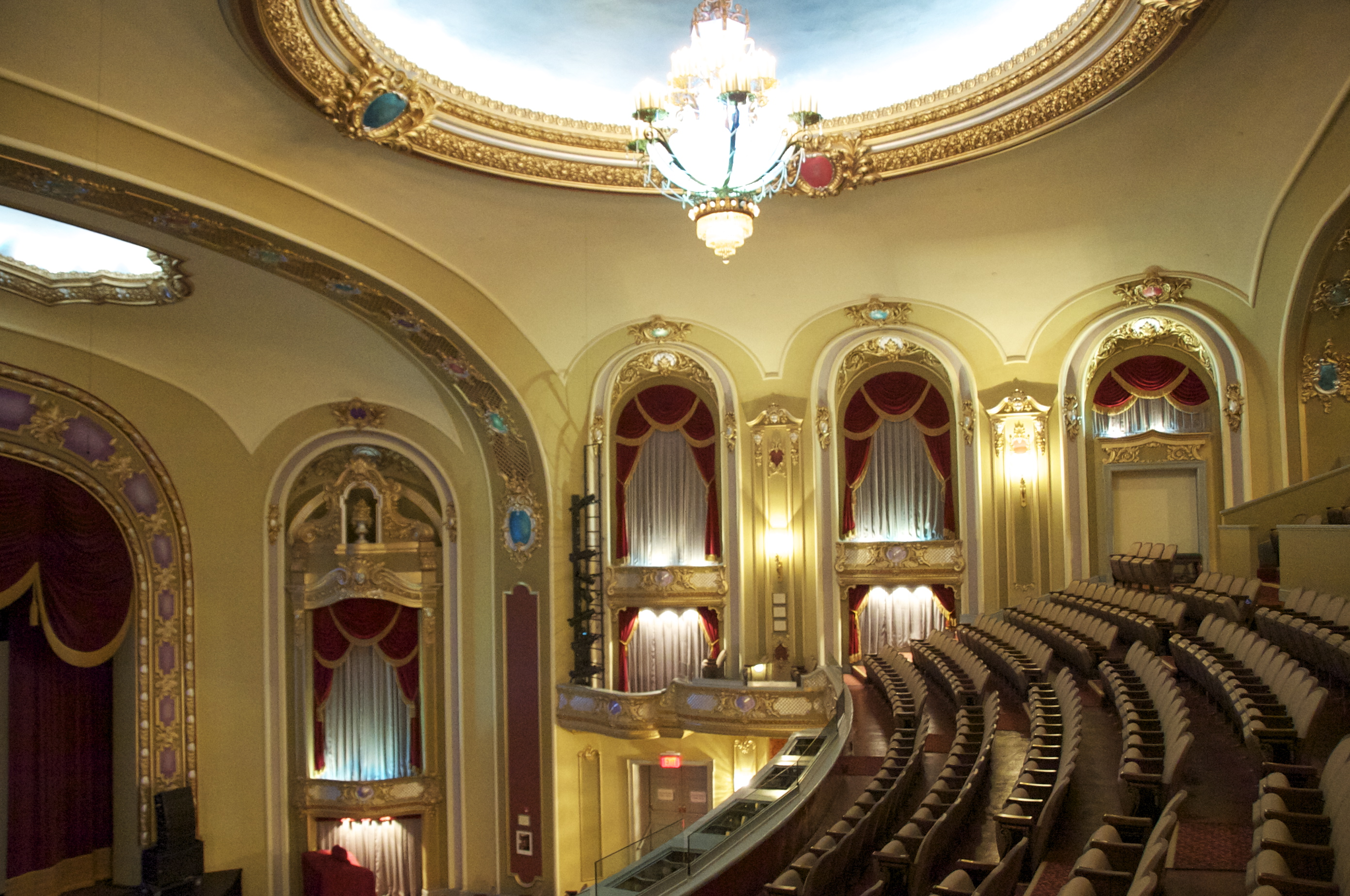
Missouri Theatre

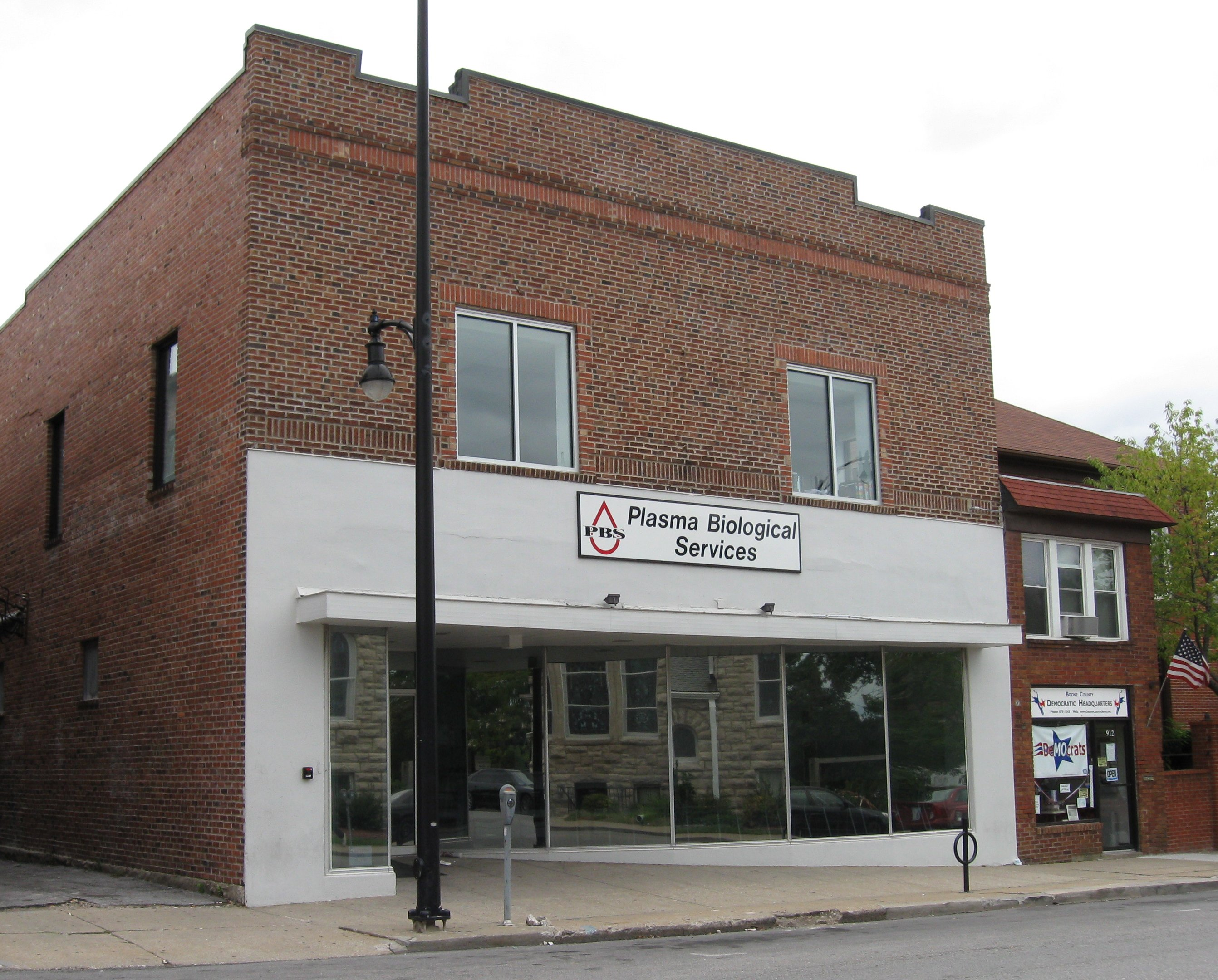
McCain Furniture Store

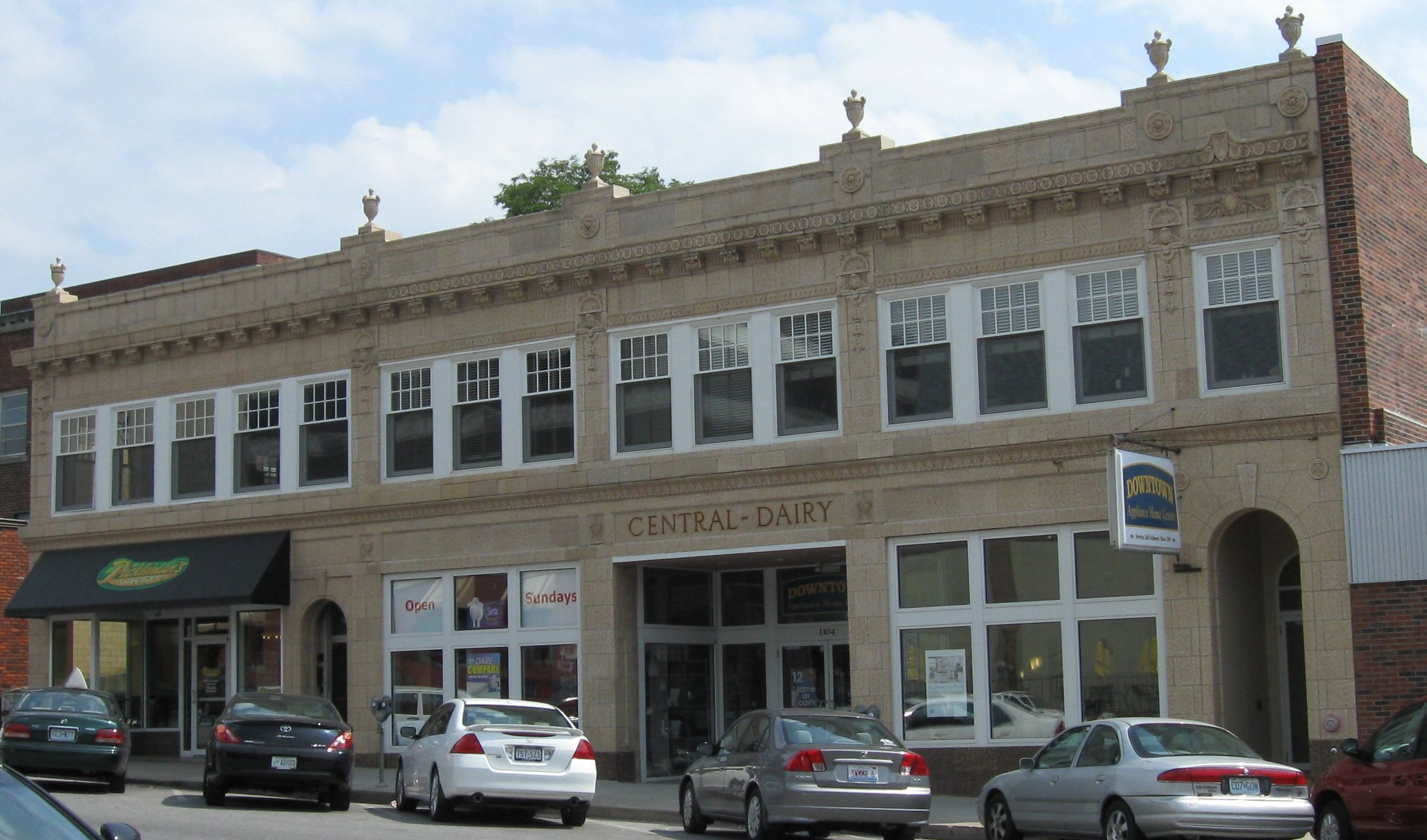
Central Dairy Building

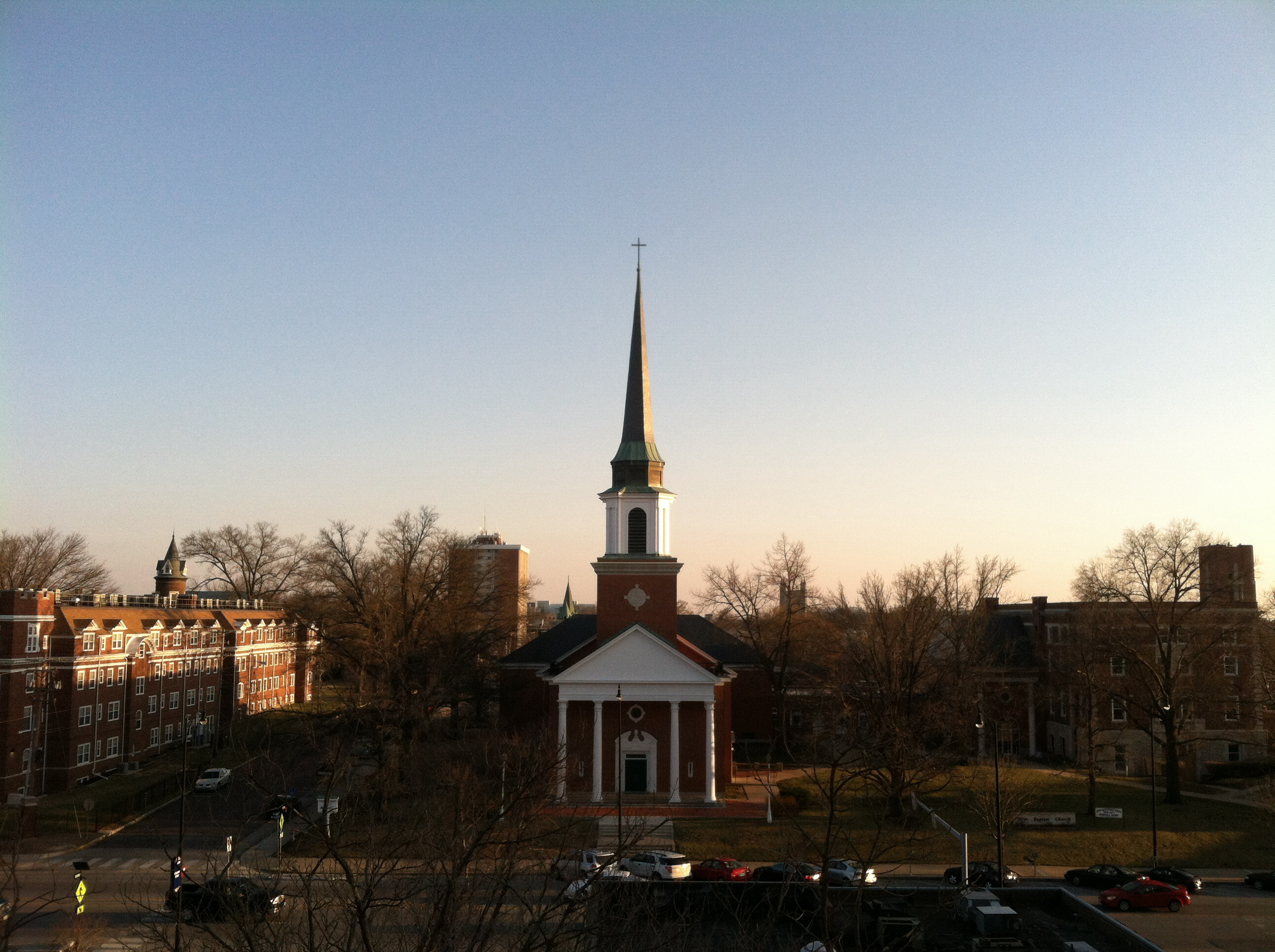
First Baptist Church
