= Columbia Branch =

Railway line in Missouri, U.S.

Overview
- Owner: Columbia, Missouri

Service
- Operator(s): Columbia Terminal Railroad

History
- Opened: October 29, 1867

Technical
- Line length: 21.7 mi (34.9 km)
- Track gauge: 1,435 mm (4 ft 8 1/2 in) standard gauge

The Columbia Branch is a railway line in Boone County, Missouri. 21.7 miles (34.9 km) long, it runs from Columbia, Missouri, to Centralia, Missouri, where it joins the St. Louis District of the Norfolk Southern Railway. Originally built by the Boone County and Jefferson City Railroad in 1867, today it is owned by the city of Columbia and operated by the Columbia Terminal Railroad.

== History ==
The Boone County and Jefferson City Railroad was incorporated in 1857 to build a railway between Columbia and Jefferson City, Missouri. Nothing was done before the American Civil War broke out in 1861. In 1866, the war over, the North Missouri Railroad leased the Boone County and Jefferson City Railroad. The North Missouri's line ran east–west through Centralia, Missouri, roughly 20 miles (32 km) north of Columbia. The new branch line opened on October 29, 1867.

The line was never extended beyond Columbia, though it changed ownership several times. The North Missouri Railroad was reorganized in 1872 as the St. Louis, Kansas City and Northern Railway, while the Boone County and Jefferson City Railroad itself reorganized as the Boone County and Boonville Railway in 1873. The leasehold continued under the Wabash, St. Louis and Pacific Railway (1879–1887), the Wabash Western Railway (1887–1889), and finally the Wabash Railroad (1889–1902). Finally, in 1902, the Wabash formed the Columbia and St. Louis Railroad as a vehicle to acquire the Boone County and Boonville Railway and the Columbia Branch outright.

The Norfolk and Western Railway leased the Wabash in 1964, ending the Wabash's independent existence. The Norfolk and Western itself merged with the Southern Railway in 1982 to form the Norfolk Southern Railway. When the Norfolk Southern proposed the abandon the line in 1987, the city of Columbia acquired it and created the Columbia Terminal Railroad to serve freight customers along the route.
