= 2022 United States local elections =

As part of the 2022 United States elections, throughout the year various elections were held at the local level, including the office of mayor, as well as several other municipal and county-level positions. A number of major U.S. cities held mayoral elections in 2022, and saw incumbent mayors re-elected, including Fort Smith, Arkansas (George McGill); Little Rock, Arkansas (Frank Scott Jr.); Tallahassee, Florida (John E. Dailey); Lexington, Kentucky (Linda Gorton); Flint, Michigan (Sheldon Neely); Reno, Nevada (Hillary Schieve); Newark, New Jersey (Ras Baraka); Charlotte, North Carolina (Vi Lyles), and Raleigh, North Carolina (Mary-Ann Baldwin); Oklahoma City, Oklahoma (David Holt); Clarksville, Tennessee (Joe Pitts); Murfreesboro, Tennessee (Shane McFarland); Denton, Texas (Gerard Hudspeth); and Washington, D.C. (Muriel Bowser).

Open mayoral seats were won in Anaheim, California (Ashleigh Aitken); Chula Vista, California (John McCann); Long Beach, California (Rex Richardson); Los Angeles, California (Karen Bass); Oakland, California (Sheng Thao); and San Jose, California (Matt Mahan); Augusta, Georgia (Garnett Johnson); Louisville, Kentucky (Craig Greenberg); Henderson, Nevada (Michelle Romero), and North Las Vegas, Nevada (Pamela Goynes-Brown); Columbia, Missouri (Barbara Buffaloe); Providence, Rhode Island (Brett Smiley); Austin, Texas (Kirk Watson); Laredo, Texas (Victor Trevino); Lubbock, Texas (Tray Payne); and Newport News, Virginia (Phillip Jones).

In San Bernardino, California, city worker Helen Tran was elected to replace incumbent John Valdivia, who was defeated in the blanket primary. In Shreveport, Louisiana, incumbent Adrian Perkins lost re-election in the Louisiana primary, and was succeeded by former city councilor Tom Arceneaux in the runoff. In Boulder City, Nevada, incumbent mayor Kiernan McManus lost re-election in a landslide to state senator Joe Hardy in the primary election. In Norman, Oklahoma, Larry Heikkila defeated one-term incumbent mayor Breea Clark. In Milwaukee, Wisconsin, acting mayor Cavalier Johnson won the special election to a full term against Bob Donovan.

== Mayoral elections ==
In the 2022 Oklahoma City mayoral election on February 8, one-term incumbent David Holt, a former Republican as most mayoral elections are nonpartisan, won reelection against Frank Urbanic and Carol Hefner. Several races were held on April 5. In the 2022 Columbia, Missouri, mayoral election, Barbara Buffaloe narrowly defeated Randy Minchew, succeeding two-term incumbent Brian Treece. In the 2022 Milwaukee mayoral special election, acting mayor Cavalier Johnson won against Bob Donovan, and succeeded Tom Barrett, who resigned in December 2021 to become the U.S. Ambassador to Luxembourg. Johnson became the first African-American elected mayor of Milwaukee. In the 2022 Norman, Oklahoma mayoral election, one-term incumbent Breea Clark lost reelection in a runoff against Larry Heikkila.

In the 2022 Denton mayoral election on May 7, one-term incumbent Gerard Hudspeth won reelection against Paul Meltzer. In the 2022 Newark mayoral election on May 10, two-term incumbent Ras Baraka won reelection against Sheila Montague. In the 2022 Charlotte mayoral election on July 26, two-term incumbent Vi Lyles won reelection against Stephanie de Sarachaga-Bilbao.

For the 2022 Flint mayoral election, incumbent Sheldon Neely faced a rematch with former Flint Mayor Karen Weaver. Neely was the leading candidate, while she was the runner-up in the primary. In the Flint Mayoral general election on November 8, Neeley defeated Weaver with a close margin, earning his reelection for a second term.

For the 2022 Los Angeles mayoral election, the liberal Democratic state representative Karen Bass and Rick Caruso, a Republican-turned-Democrat businessman, were the two most voted candidates and advanced to the runoff election on November 8. In a fairly competitive runoff, Bass defeated Caruso. She succeeded two-term incumbent Eric Garcetti, and in doing so became the first woman and the second Black person (after Tom Bradley) to be elected mayor of Los Angeles.

In the 2022 Clarksville mayoral election, incumbent Democrat Joe Pitts was re-elected. In the 2022 Murfreesboro mayoral election, incumbent Republican Shane McFarland was re-elected. In the 2022 Fort Smith, Arkansas, mayoral election, incumbent Democrat George McGill was unopposed and re-elected. In the 2022 Lexington, Kentucky, mayoral election, incumbent Republican Linda Gorton won reelection against Democrat David Kloiber. In the 2022 Little Rock mayoral election, incumbent Democrat Frank Scott Jr. won reelection against Republican Steve Landers. In the 2022 San Bernardino mayoral election, independent Helen Tran defeated independent Jim Penman for the mayor's seat, John Valdivia, another independent who was defeated in the June 7 primary. Tran is set to become the city's first Asian-American mayor. In the 2022 Tallahassee mayoral election, incumbent Democrat John E. Dailey won reelection against Kristin Dozier. In the 2022 Shreveport mayoral election, incumbent Democrat Adrian Perkins lost reelection, as Republican Tom Arceneaux and Democrat Gregory Tarver advanced to the runoff election. Arceneaux, a former city councilor, won the runoff on December 10. He was the first Republican elected to the position in 28 years.

In the 2022 Reno mayoral election, incumbent independent Hillary Schieve won reelection against independent Eddie Lorton. In the 2022 Raleigh mayoral election, incumbent Democrat Mary-Ann Baldwin won reelection against liberal challenger Terrance Ruth. In the 2022 Washington, D.C., mayoral election, incumbent Democrat Muriel Bowser won reelection against independent Rodney Grant and Republican Stacia Hall. In the 2022 Anaheim mayoral election, incumbent Republican Harry Sidhu resigned amid a federal corruption investigation into his office, and was succeeded by attorney Ashleigh Aitken, the first woman elected mayor of Anaheim. In the 2022 Chula Vista mayoral election, incumbent Democrat Mary Salas was ineligible to run for reelection due to term limits, and was succeeded by John McCann, who won against Ammar Campa-Najjar by about 5 percentage points. In the 2022 Long Beach mayoral election, Rex Richardson won the election against Suzie Price to succeed Robert Garcia, and is set to become the city's first Black mayor. In the 2022 Oakland mayoral election, incumbent Democrat Libby Schaaf was ineligible to run for reelection due to term limits, and was succeeded by Sheng Thao. In the 2022 San Jose mayoral election, incumbent Democrat Sam Liccardo was ineligible to run for reelection due to term limits, and was succeeded by Matt Mahan.

In the 2022 Augusta mayoral election, Garnett Johnson defeated Steven Kendrick, succeeding the term-limited Hardie Davis. In the 2022 Louisville mayoral election, Democrat Craig Greenberg won the election against Republican Bill Dieruf to succeed another Democrat, Greg Fischer, who was term-limited. In the 2022 Henderson mayoral election, incumbent Democrat Debra March was ineligible to run for reelection due to term limits. and was succeeded by Michelle Romero. In the 2022 Boulder City mayoral election, Kiernan McManus lost re-election in a landslide to Joe Hardy in the primary election. In the 2022 North Las Vegas mayoral election, incumbent Republican John Jay Lee retired to run for governor of Nevada. He was succeeded by Pamela Goynes-Brown, the city's first Black mayor, after defeating Patricia Spearman.

In the 2022 Austin mayoral election, incumbent Democrat Steve Adler was ineligible to run for reelection due to term limits. In the general election, state representative Celia Israel and former mayor Kirk Watson took the first two spots, leading realtor Jennifer Virden and several other candidates. Because no candidate received more than 50% of the vote, the race proceeded to a runoff election between Israel and Watson on December 13, which Watson won with 886 votes—the narrowest margin in over two decades. In the 2022 Laredo mayoral election, city councilman Mercurio Martinez III and doctor Victor Trevino advanced to a December 10 runoff, as incumbent Pete Saenz was term-limited. Trevin won out over Martinez. In the 2022 Lubbock mayoral election, incumbent Republican Dan Pope retired, and was succeeded by Tray Payne. In the 2022 Providence mayoral election, Brett Smiley, a Democrat, won the election unopposed. She succeed another Democrat, Jorge Elorza, who was term-limited. In the 2022 Newport News mayoral election, incumbent independent McKinley L. Price retired, and was succeeded by Phillip Jones.

== County elections ==
Several county elections were held in 2022, including:

- Cook County, Illinois: Assessor, Clerk, Sheriff, Treasurer, Board of Commissioners, Board of Review, Water Reclamation District Board, Circuit Court
- Cuyahoga County, Ohio: Executive, Council
- Knox County, Tennessee mayoral election
- Hamilton County, Tennessee mayoral election
- Hennepin County, Minnesota: Attorney, Sheriff
- Los Angeles County, California: Sheriff, Assessor, Board of Supervisors, Superior Court
- Orange County, California: District Attorney, Board of Supervisors
- Shelby County, Tennessee mayoral election

== Other municipal elections ==
Other municipal elections were held in 2022, including:

- Cook County, Illinois: Assessor, Clerk, Sheriff, Treasurer, Board of Commissioners, Board of Review, Water Reclamation District Board, Circuit Court
- Cuyahoga County, Ohio: Executive, Council
- Hennepin County, Minnesota: Attorney, Sheriff
- Los Angeles, California: City Attorney, City Controller, City Council, Board of Education
- Los Angeles County, California: Sheriff, Assessor, Board of Supervisors, Superior Court
- Maricopa County, Arizona: County Attorney
- Orange County, California: District Attorney, Board of Supervisors
- Portland, Oregon: City Commission
- San Francisco, California: District Attorney, Board of Supervisors, Board of Education
- Santa Clara County, California: Board of Supervisors
- Tulsa, Oklahoma: City Auditor, City Council
- Washington, D.C.: District Council, Shadow Representative
