= 2016 Columbia, Missouri, mayoral election =

- April 5, 2016
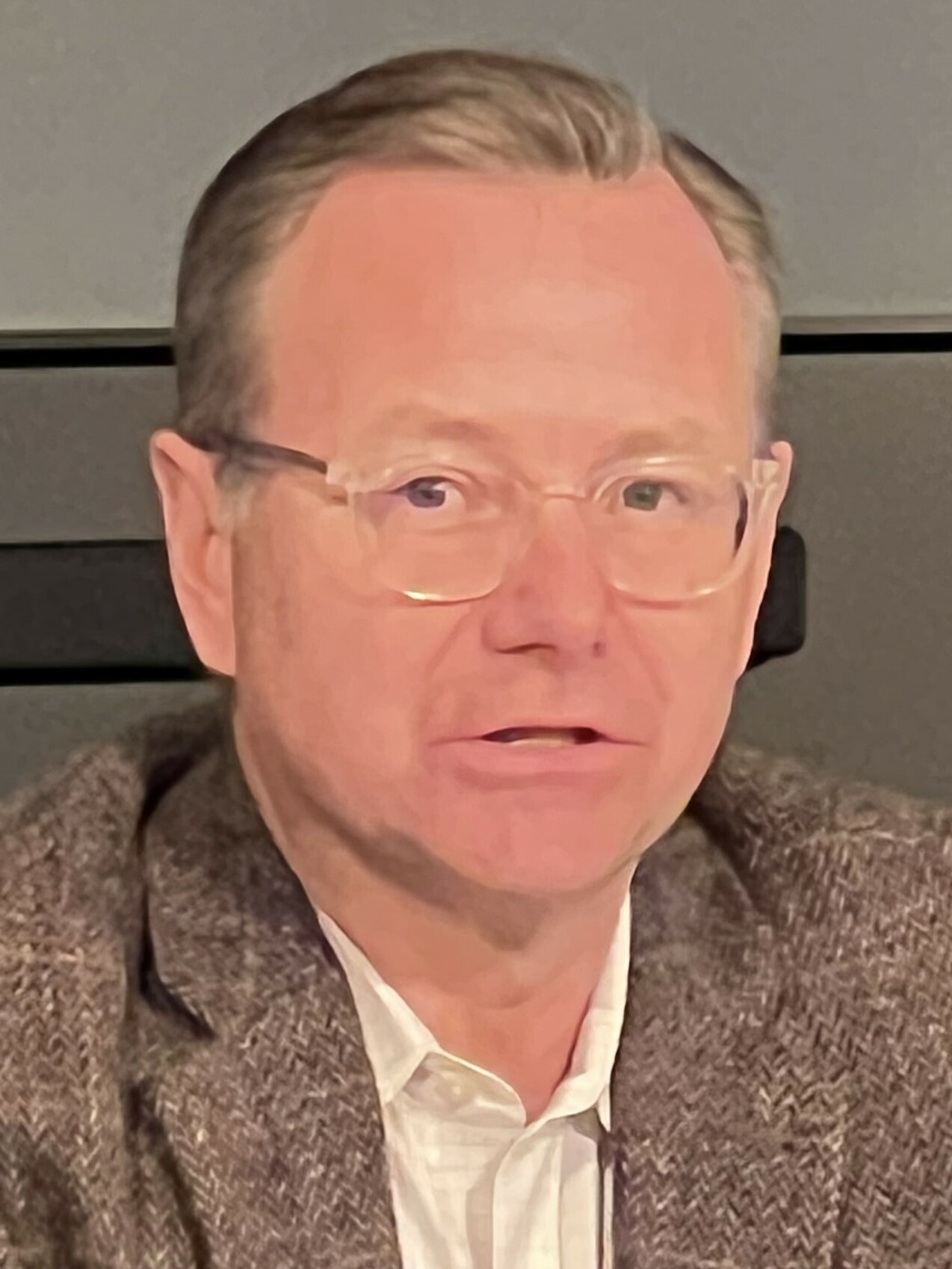
Candidate	Brian Treece	Skip Walther
Party	Nonpartisan	Nonpartisan
Popular vote	9,211	8,439
Percentage	52.19%	47.81%
Mayor before election
Bob McDavid
Elected mayor
Brian Treece

Columbia, Missouri held an election for mayor on April 5, 2016.

== Background ==
On September 21, 2015, incumbent mayor Bob McDavid announced that he would not run for re-election to a third term. Citing personal reasons, he stated to the press, "There are a lot of personal issues that are involved with this decision. It had to do with my wife, myself and our plans."

Candidate petition filings for the municipal elections were open beginning October 27, 2015 at 8:00 am and closed on January 12, 2016. Candidates running for mayor required the valid signatures of at least 100 (but not exceeding 150) registered Columbia voters.

== Campaign ==
Local attorney Skip Walther was the first candidate to enter the race on September 22, 2015.

Walther ran unopposed in the campaign until Brian Treece, a political consultant and the chairman of the Downtown Columbia Leadership Council, formed a campaign committee on December 1. Treece officially announced his intention to run for mayor the following day.

=== Endorsements ===
==== Brian Treece ====
On December 10, 2015, the Columbia Police Officers Association endorsed Treece in a news release, citing his support for expanding the ranks of the Columbia Police Department and his experience lobbying for the Missouri Fraternal Order of Police.

Treece garnered the endorsement of Laborers' International Union of North America Local 773, the first public endorsement for a candidate in the union's history. In a press release, Local 773 field representative Regina Guevara attributed the endorsement to Treece's support for workers and organized labor, additionally stating he was "committed to addressing our long neglected infrastructure issues."

On February 18, 2016, Treece won the endorsement of Columbia Professional Fire Fighters Local 1055, which represented roughly 90% of firefighters in the Columbia Fire Department.

==== Skip Walthers ====
Incumbent mayor Bob McDavid and previous mayor Darwin Hindman announced their endorsement of Skip Walther on March 11, 2016.

== Results ==
Treece defeated Walther by a close margin.

2016 Columbia mayoral election
Party	Candidate	Votes	%
Nonpartisan	Brian Treece	9,211	52.19%
Nonpartisan	Skip Walther	8,439	47.81%

=== Reactions and aftermath ===
In his victory speech, Treece thanked his supporters and characterized the election as a "referendum on whether Columbia is going to be a city that works for all of us."

Walthers conceded the election to Treece at his campaign watch party, telling supporters, "Despite tonight’s result I am proud of the campaign we ran, for the message we tried to deliver and most of all, I am proud to call all of you my friends." Walthers walked to Treece's watch party afterwards to congratulate him in person.

== See also ==
- List of mayors of Columbia, Missouri
