= Columbia City Hall =

Columbia City Hall may refer to:

- City Hall (Columbia, Missouri), contributing property on the NRHP, in Columbia, Missouri
- Columbia City Hall (South Carolina), listed on the NRHP in Columbia, South Carolina
