= 2025 Columbia, Missouri mayoral election =

- April 8, 2025
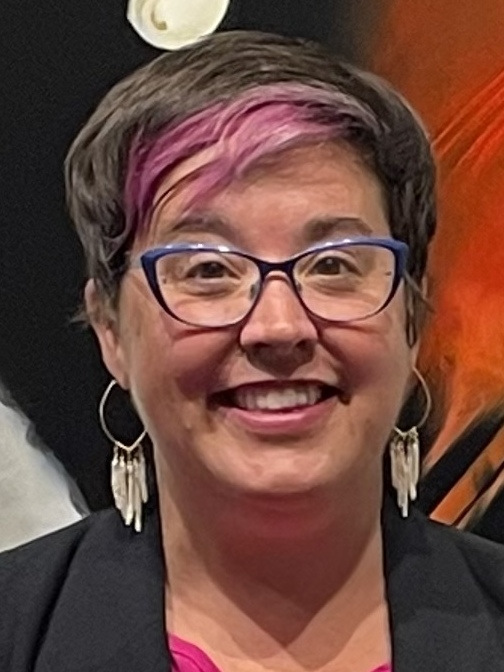

Candidate	Barbara Buffaloe	Blair Murphy
Popular vote	14,073	10,663
Percentage	55.08%	41.73%
Mayor before election
Barbara Buffaloe
Elected mayor
Barbara Buffaloe

Columbia, Missouri, held a mayoral election on April 8, 2025, concurrently with elections for the city council members for city wards 3 and 4. The incumbent mayor, Barbara Buffaloe, was re-elected to a second term in office. She garnered just over 55 percent of the total citywide vote.

== Background ==
In 2022, former Columbia Sustainability Manager Barbara Buffaloe won the mayoral election to succeed outgoing Mayor Brian Treece, subsequently being sworn into office on April 18, 2022. Buffaloe sought re-election to a second term, announcing her second consecutive mayoral campaign on January 28, 2025. At this launch event, Buffaloe outlined her campaign's guiding themes, hoping to convince voters with accomplishments from her first term.

Buffaloe faced-off against two challengers during the election campaign; paint store owner Blair "Murph" Murphy and Missouri School of Journalism adjunct professor Tanya Heath. Both of these challengers qualified for the general election ballot, while Lucio Bitoy IV achieved ballot access as a recognized write-in candidate. A major theme for the mayoral election was improving city safety and the reduction of crime in the Columbia area, with all three qualified candidates making it a central issue of their respective campaigns.

The mayor's campaign garnered endorsements from various local groups, including the local union representing public sector employees in the Columbia city government. In addition to public safety concerns, Buffaloe also promised to prioritize addressing the city's turnover rate within its administration.

Murphy's first-time political campaign was bolstered by both individual donations and a large contribution from Citizens for a Better Columbia PAC. While Murphy received several endorsements from local businesspeople, he also picked up the controversial public endorsement of head Missouri Tigers football coach Eli Drinkwitz, who was subsequently subjected to a formal ethics complaint for endorsing Murphy; this was alleged as a potential violation of the University of Missouri's employee policies. In terms of campaign fundraising and spending, the Murphy campaign exceeded that of all other candidates.

== Candidates ==
Candidate	Experience	Announced
Barbara Buffaloe	Incumbent mayor (2022–present); Former Columbia sustainability manager (2010–2021)	January 31, 2025 (Website)
Tanya Heath	Adjunct professor at the Missouri School of Journalism; Candidate for mayor of Columbia, Missouri (2022); Former president of the American Advertising Federation of Mid-Missouri	September 25, 2024
Blair "Murph" Murphy	Owner of Johnston Paint and Decorating; CrimeStoppers Board member	October 17, 2024 (Website)

=== Write-in candidates ===
- Lucio Bitoy IV, former Missouri Department of Social Services worker

=== Endorsements ===
Barbara Buffaloe

Local officials

- Quinton Lucas, mayor of Kansas City (2019–present)
- Mary Anne McCollum, former mayor of Columbia, Missouri (1989–1994)
- Adrian Plank, state representative from the 47th district (2023–present) (Democrat)
- Kathy Steinhoff, state representative from the 45th district (2023–present) (Democrat)

Individuals

- David Wilson, co-founder of True/False Film Festival

Organizations

- Abortion Action Missouri
- Boone County Democrats
- LiUNA Local 955
Blair Murphy

Local officials

- Dwayne Carey, Boone County sheriff (2005–present) (Democrat)

Individuals

- Eli Drinkwitz, head coach of the Missouri Tigers football (2019–present)

Organizations

- Columbia Police Officers Association

== Results ==
2025 Columbia, Missouri, mayoral election
Party	Candidate	Votes	%
Nonpartisan	Barbara Buffaloe	14,073	55.08%
Nonpartisan	Blair "Murph" Murphy	10,663	41.73%
Nonpartisan	Tanya Heath	779	3.05%
Nonpartisan	Write-in	37	0.14%
Total votes		25,552	100%

== See also ==
- List of mayors of Columbia, Missouri
