= Chris Kelly (American politician) =

American politician (born 1946)

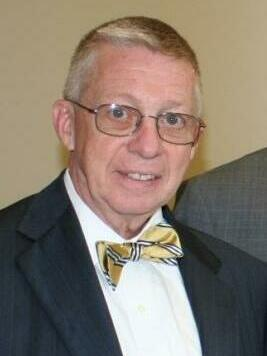
- Kelly in 2011

Member of the Missouri House of Representatives from the 45th district
- In office 2009–2014

Personal details
- Born: October 22, 1946 (age 79) Batavia, New York, U.S.
- Party: Democratic
- Profession: Lawyer, judge

Chris Kelly (born October 22, 1946) is an American politician. He was a member of the Missouri House of Representatives from the 26th District with the elections of 1982 through 1990, from the 23rd District with the election of 1992, from the 24th District with the elections of 2008 and 2010, and from the 45th District with the election of 2012, a member of the Democratic party. During much of the time between the two stints as a legislator, he served as an associate circuit judge on the 13th Circuit Court of Missouri. Kelly is a lawyer and judge and alumnus of Marist College and the University of Missouri. He was defeated by Brian Treece for mayor of Columbia, Missouri in the 2019 election.
