= List of mayors of Columbia, Missouri =

Columbia, Missouri mayors

The following is a list of mayors of the city of Columbia, Missouri, United States.

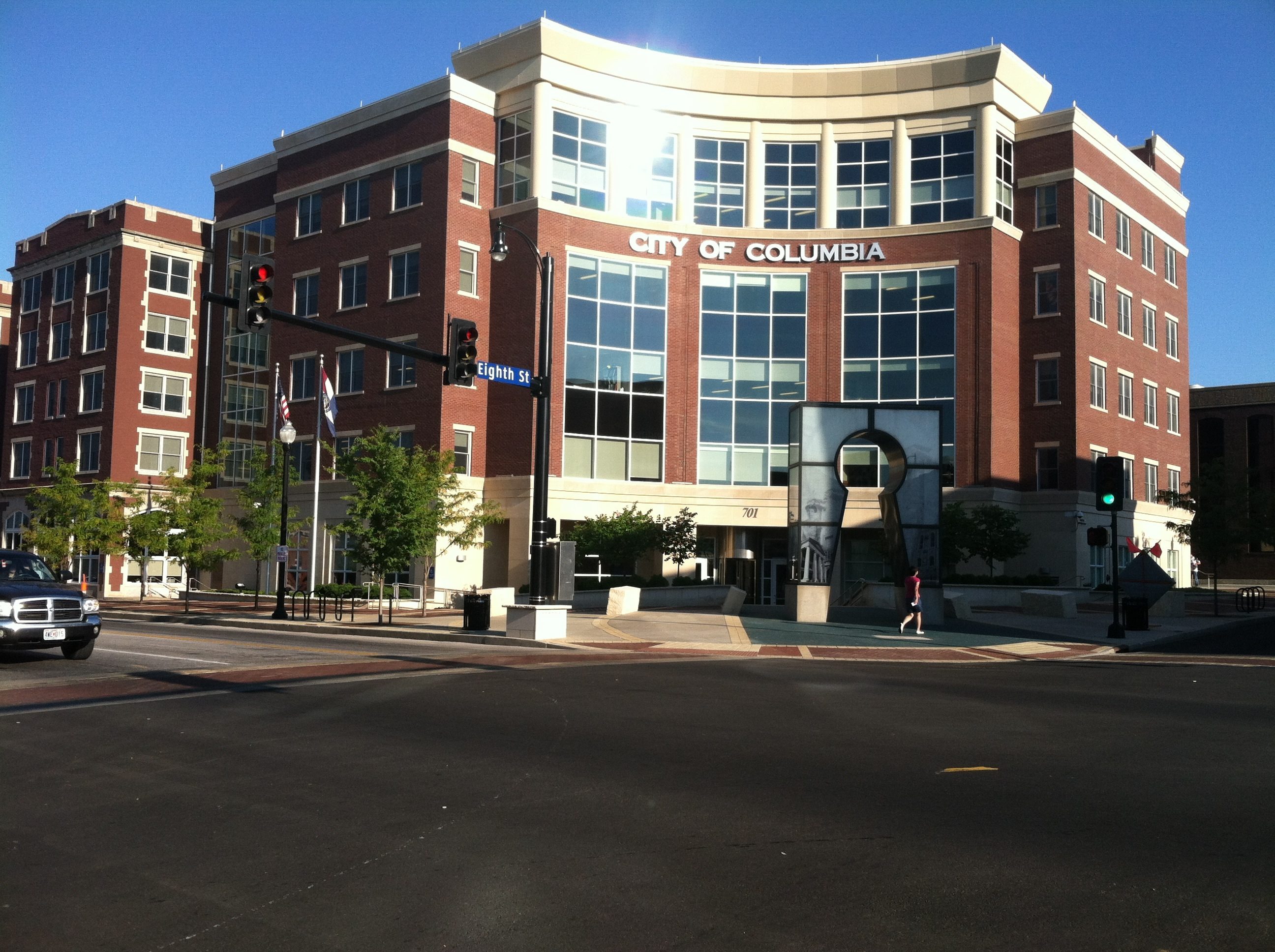
City hall building in Columbia, 2013

- Richard Gentry, 1821
- William Jewell
- Walter W. Garth
- Thomas B. Gentry
- Webster Gordon
- Odon Guitar
- John M. Samuel
- James H. Guitar, 1892–1895
- Logan Norvill
- Malcolm G. Quinn
- W.S. Johnson
- James C. Gillaspy, c.1901
- Moss P. Parker, c.1902
- Frederick W. Niedermeyer, c.1904
- E.C. Clinkscales, c.1907
- Stanley N. Smith, c.1909–1911
- William S. St. Clair, 1911–1912
- W.P. Moore, c.1914–1915
- J.M. Batterton, c.1916
- James E. Boggs, 1917–1918
- James R. Gordon, c.1921–1923, 1931–1933
- Emmett McDonnell, 1923–1927
- W. J. Hetzler, 1927–1931
- Searcy Pollard, 1933–1937
- Rex Barrett, 1937–1939
- H. L. Wilson, 1939–1940
- Rex P. Barrett, 1940–1943
- B. C. Hunt, 1943–1945
- Bruce J. Carl, 1945–1947
- M. P. Blackmore, 1947–1949
- Roy Sappington, 1949–1953
- Howard B. Lang Jr., 1953–1957
- Kenneth H. Puckett, 1957–1961
- Robert C. Smith, 1961–1963
- J. H. Longwell, 1963–1967
- George Nickolaus, 1967–1969
- Herbert Jeans, 1969–1971
- Orville E. Hobart, 1971–1973
- Tom R. Anderson, 1973–1975
- Robert K. Pugh, 1975–1977
- Leslie T. Proctor, 1977–1979
- H. Clyde Wilson Jr., 1979–1981
- John D. Westlund, 1981–1985
- Rodney Smith, c.1985–1989
- Mary Anne McCollum, 1989–1995
- Darwin Hindman, 1995–2010
- Robert McDavid, 2010–2016
- Brian Treece, 2016–2022
- Barbara Buffaloe, 2022–present

== See also ==
- 2016 Columbia, Missouri, mayoral election
- 2019 Columbia, Missouri, mayoral election
- 2022 Columbia, Missouri, mayoral election
- 2025 Columbia, Missouri, mayoral election
- Columbia City Council
- City Hall (Columbia, Missouri)
- History of Columbia, Missouri
