= St. Joseph's Academy (Laredo, Texas) =

Defunct private school

Saint Joseph's Academy, sometimes referred to as St. Joe or SJA, was a private school started by the Marist Brothers of the Schools. It was located in Laredo, Texas, United States, and served junior high and high school students in Laredo and the surrounding areas.

== History ==
St. Joseph's Academy was founded in Laredo in 1934 by exiled Marist Brothers who were fleeing Mexico to avoid religious persecution by the Mexican government. In 1942, St. Joseph's Academy had its first graduating class. The school had its last graduating class in 1973. The school colors were maroon and white. The school mascot was the ram but because the word "rams" could be used in a derogatory way in Spanish, the mascot was changed to "antlers".

== Alumni ==
- George P. Kazen (February 29, 1940 – April 27, 2021) was a United States district judge of the United States District Court for the Southern District of Texas from 1979 to 2018.
- Charles Robert Borchers (Class of 1960), district attorney of the 49th Judicial District attorney 1973-1980
- Julio A. Garcia (Class of 1959), district attorney of the 49th Judicial District 1981-1988
- Pete Saenz (Class of 1969), mayor of Laredo since November 12, 2014; former member and president of the Laredo Community College board of trustees.
