= Darwin Hindman =

American lawyer

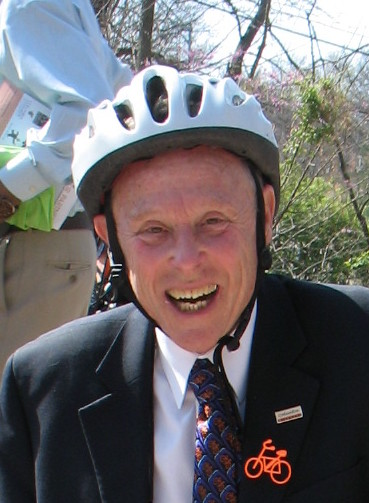
- Mayor Darwin Hindman of Columbia, Missouri

Mayor of Columbia, Missouri
- In office April 1995 – April 2010

Personal details
- Born: Darwin Alexander Hindman; April 30, 1933 Columbus, Ohio
- Died: June 17, 2019 (aged 86) Columbia, Missouri
- Spouse: Axie Hindman
- Education: University of Missouri (B.A., J.D.)
- Profession: Attorney

Darwin Alexander Hindman (April 30, 1933 – June 17, 2019) was an American politician and mayor of Columbia, Missouri. He was elected mayor in 1995 and finished his fifth elected term (15 years total) in April 2010 after announcing he would not be running for re-election at the end of that term. During Hindman's term as mayor, Columbia and three other cities received 25 million dollars in federal funding to run a pilot project to promote bicycling and walking as an alternative to driving. In 2009 he was one of three mayors to receive the Leadership for Healthy Communities Award, along with Michael Bloomberg of New York City and Gavin Newsom of San Francisco. He has been called the "Father of the Katy Trail." He was one of the longest serving members of the Columbia City Council.

== Education and early life ==
Hindman was born in Columbus, Ohio in 1933 and moved to Columbia in 1935. He received degrees in political science and law from the University of Missouri (1955 and 1961 respectively). Hindman flew bombers and transport planes during two tours of active duty as a pilot in the United States Air Force. He lived in Columbia nearly all of his life.

== Service ==
Hindman was involved with the Columbia Tomorrow Committee, the Missouri State Parks Advisory Board, Citizens Campaign for the Katy Trail State Park, the Missouri Economic Development Finance Board, the Missouri Environmental Improvement Board, and the Missouri Energy Resource Authority. He was president of the Missouri Rails-to-Trails Coalition and a chairman of the Katy Trail Coalition.

He was an advocate of building a pedestrian-based transportation system in Columbia and was active in political groups and committees across the state of Missouri. He was also a supporter of many of Columbia's progressive policies such as recycling programs and smoking bans.

== Awards ==
- Columbia Chamber of Commerce Outstanding Citizen of the Year
- University of Missouri Faculty Alumni
- Chevron Times Mirror Publications Citizen Conservation
- Dr. Martin Luther King, Jr., Memorial Association award
- Leadership for Healthy Communities Award (2009)

== See also ==
- List of mayors of Columbia, Missouri
