= 2019 Columbia, Missouri, mayoral election =

- April 2, 2019
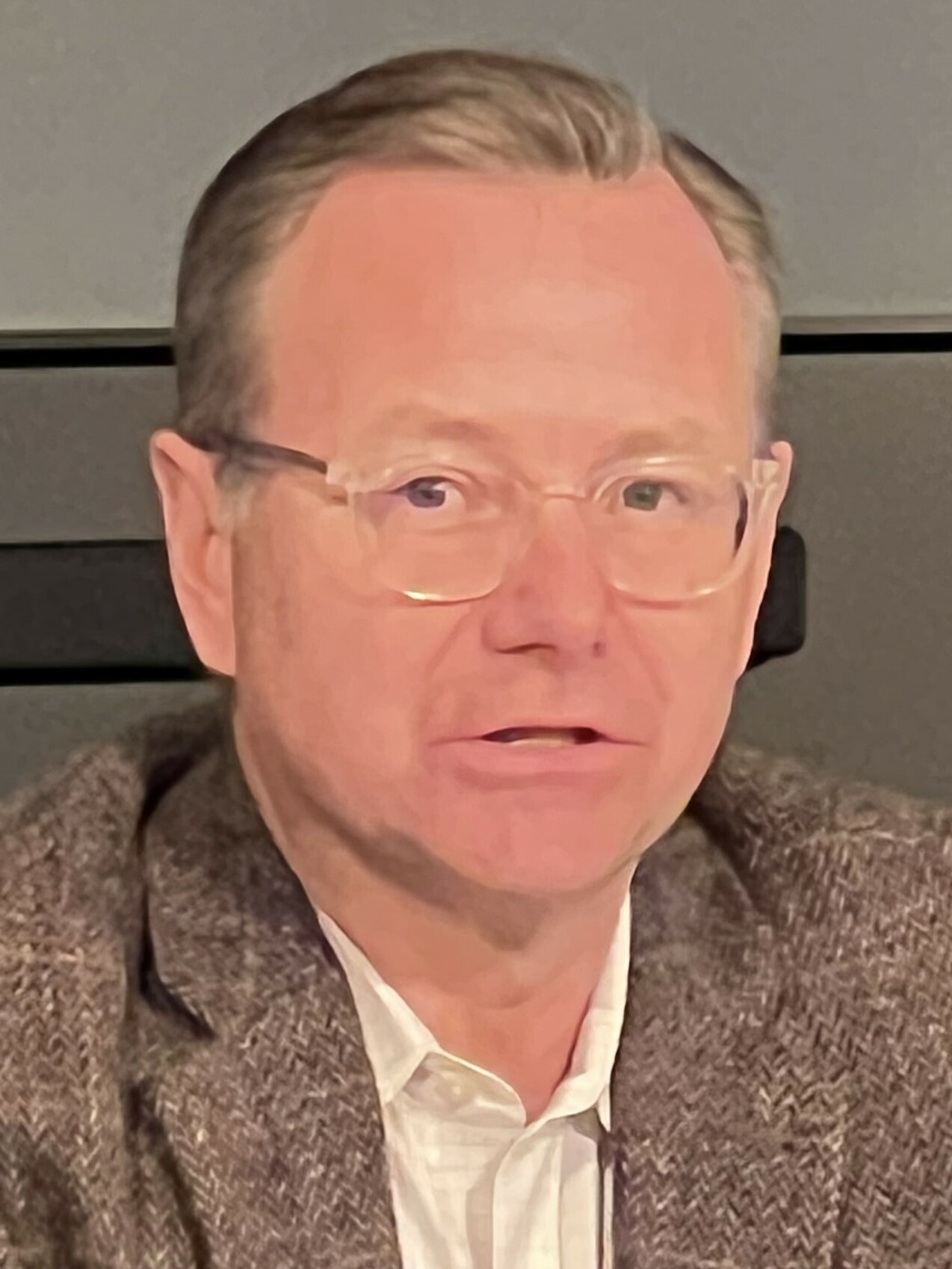

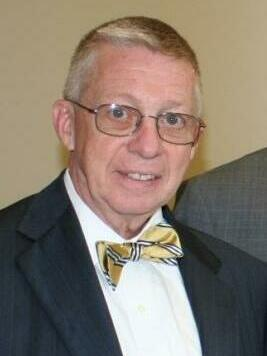
| Candidate | Brian Treece | Chris Kelly |
| Party | Nonpartisan | Nonpartisan |
| Popular vote | 10,329 | 5,762 |
| Percentage | 64.19% | 35.81% |
Mayor before election
Brian Treece
Elected mayor
Brian Treece

The American city of Columbia, Missouri held an election for mayor on April 2, 2019. Incumbent mayor Brian Treece won re-election against former Missouri House member Chris Kelly. Kelly's run for Columbia mayor was the only unsuccessful electoral campaign of his career.

== Background ==
Chris Kelly, a former Democratic member of the Missouri House of Representatives, had previously expressed interest in running for the city's highest office. On October 29, 2018, he officially announced his candidacy for Columbia mayor.

Candidate petition filings for the municipal elections were open beginning October 30, 2018, and closed on January 8, 2019. Candidates running for mayor required the valid signatures of at least 100 registered Columbia voters. Incumbent mayor Brian Treece and challenger Kelly filed their petitions on October 30.

== Campaign ==
Kelly attracted controversy early in the race, following the revelation that he had deleted thousands of tweets from his Twitter account days before beginning his campaign. Screenshots of the messages were obtained by both Treece and the Columbia HeartBeat, with Treece describing their contents as "misogynistic, racist, offensive and unacceptable." Kelly responded to the accusations by claiming that the tweets were either jokes or taken out of context, while also stating in an interview, "I sometimes have said things that I should not have said, and there's no excuse for them."

=== Polls ===
| Poll source | Date(s) administered | Sample size | Margin of error | Brian Treece | Chris Kelly | Undecided |
|---|---|---|---|---|---|---|
| Missouri Scout | February 6–8, 2019 | 484 LV | ± 4.4% | 33% | 41% | 26% |

== Results ==
Treece was re-elected mayor by a wide margin over Kelly, winning the popular vote in 33 of the city's 35 precincts.

2019 Columbia mayoral election
| Party | Candidate | Votes | % |
|---|---|---|---|
| Nonpartisan | Brian Treece | 10,329 | 64.19% |
| Nonpartisan | Chris Kelly | 5,762 | 35.81% |

== Aftermath ==
On election night, Kelly called Treece to concede the race, with Treece delivering his victory speech shortly afterwards.

== See also ==
- List of mayors of Columbia, Missouri
