= 2022 Laredo mayoral election =

- November 8, 2022 (general); December 17, 2022 (runoff)
- Turnout: 32.14% (general); 8.29% (runoff)
| Candidate | Victor D. Treviño | Mercurio Martinez III |
| Party | Nonpartisan | Nonpartisan |
| Popular vote | 8,765 (G); 8,435 (R) | 9,097 (G); 7,171 (R) |
| Percentage | 21.00% (G); 54.05% (R) | 21.80% (G); 45.95% (R) |
| Candidate | Cynthia Mares | Roque Vela Jr. |
| Party | Nonpartisan | Nonpartisan |
| Popular vote | 7,859 | 7,323 |
| Percentage | 18.83% | 17.55% |
Mayor before election
Pete Saenz
Democratic
Elected mayor
Victor D. Treviño
Independent

The 2022 Laredo mayoral election was held on November 8, 2022, to elect the mayor of Laredo, Texas. Incumbent mayor Pete Saenz could not seek reelection due to term limit. Since no candidates had received over 50% of the total vote, a runoff election was scheduled on December 17. Victor D. Treviño, the Health Authority of Laredo, was elected to be the new mayor.

== General election ==
Election results
| Candidate | Votes | % |
|---|---|---|
| Mercurio Martinez III | 9,097 | 21.80 |
| Victor D. Treviño | 8,765 | 21.00 |
| Cynthia Mares | 7,859 | 18.83 |
| Roque Vela Jr. | 7,323 | 17.55 |
| Poncho Casso | 5,027 | 12.04 |
| Gus Gonzalez | 987 | 2.36 |
| Juan Manuel Garza | 965 | 2.31 |
| Felipe E. Ramirez | 655 | 1.57 |
| Louis H. Bruni | 592 | 1.42 |
| Kobby Bryand | 468 | 1.12 |
| Total votes | 43,697 | 100 |

== Runoff election ==
Election results
| Candidate | Votes | % |
|---|---|---|
| Victor D. Treviño | 8,435 | 54.05 |
| Mercurio Martinez III | 7,171 | 45.95 |
| Total votes | 15,606 | 100 |
