= 2022 Columbia, Missouri, mayoral election =

- April 5, 2022
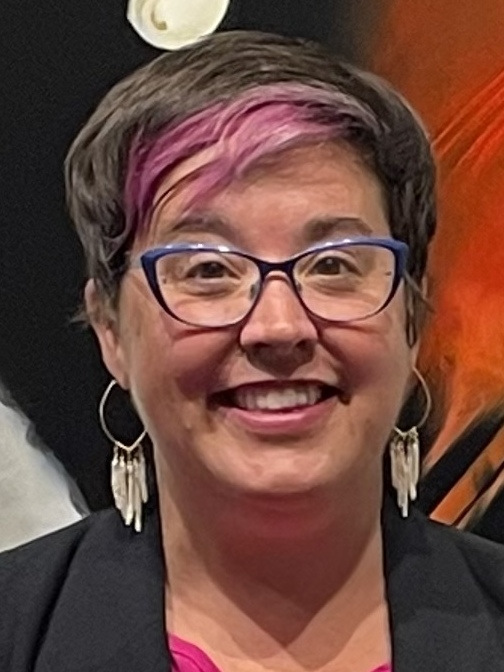
Candidate	Barbara Buffaloe	Randy Minchew	David Seamon
Party	Nonpartisan	Nonpartisan	Nonpartisan
Popular vote	8,528	7,728	2,930
Percentage	42.93%	38.90%	14.75%
Mayor before election
Brian Treece
Elected mayor
Barbara Buffaloe

Columbia, Missouri held an election on April 5, 2022, concurrently with elections for the city council members for wards 3 and 4.

== Background ==
During a community briefing on September 17, 2021, incumbent mayor Brian Treece announced that he would not seek re-election for a third term. Citing the "level of responsibility and the burden" of his job during the COVID-19 pandemic, he said in his statement, "The last 18 months have been no easy decisions. There's no playbook on handling a pandemic. That takes its toll."

Petition forms for candidates were made available to pick up from the office of the city clerk beginning on October 19, 2021. Candidate petition filings for the municipal elections opened on October 26 and closed on January 11, 2022, at 5 pm. Candidates running for mayor required the valid signatures of at least 100 registered Columbia voters.

== Candidates ==
Candidate	Experience	Announced
Barbara Buffaloe	Former Columbia sustainability manager (2010–2021)	October 11, 2021 (Website)
Tanya Heath	Adjunct professor at the Missouri School of Journalism; Former president of the American Advertising Federation of Mid-Missouri	October 25, 2021
Randy Minchew	Candidate for Columbia City Council for Ward 6 (2021); Candidate for Columbia City Council for Ward 6 (2015)	October 25, 2021 (Website)
David Seamon	Member of the Columbia Public Schools Board of Education (since 2020); Veteran of the United States Marine Corps	October 21, 2021 (Website)

=== Withdrew before the election ===
Candidate	Experience	Announced	Dropped out
Maria Oropallo	Chair of the Finance Advisory And Audit Committee (since 2016)	November 5, 2021 (Website)	March 12, 2022

== Results ==
2022 Columbia, Missouri, mayoral election
Party	Candidate	Votes	%
Nonpartisan	Barbara Buffaloe	8,528	42.93%
Nonpartisan	Randy Minchew	7,728	38.90%
Nonpartisan	David Seamon	2,930	14.75%
Nonpartisan	Tanya Heath	553	2.78%
Nonpartisan	Maria Oropallo	121	0.60%
Nonpartisan	Write-in	6	0.03%
Total votes		19,866	100%

== See also ==
- List of mayors of Columbia, Missouri
