= 2022 Orange County, California District Attorney election =

- June 7, 2022
- Turnout: 35.2% ▼
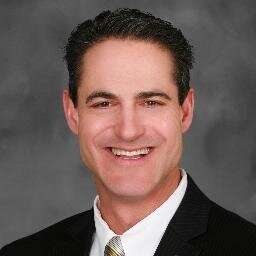

Candidate	Todd Spitzer	Pete Hardin
Popular vote	352,415	119,886
Percentage	62.49%	21.26%
Candidate	Bryan Chehock	Michael A. Jacobs
Popular vote	46,425	45,190
Percentage	8.23%	8.01%
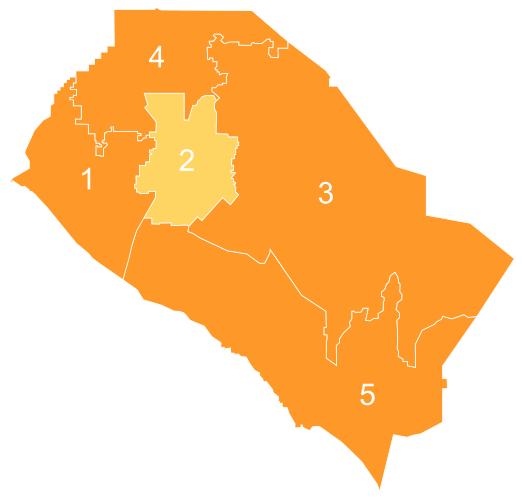
- County supervisorial district results Spitzer: 50–60% 60–70%
District Attorney before election
Todd Spitzer
Elected District Attorney
Todd Spitzer

The 2022 Orange, County, California District Attorney election was held on June 7, 2022.

Incumbent District Attorney Todd Spitzer ran for a second term. Spitzer was first elected in 2014 with 53.2% of the vote in 2018.

Because Spitzer got a majority of the vote in the first round, he avoided a runoff and won a second term in the first round.

== Candidates ==
- Note: County elections in California are officially nonpartisan. The parties below identify which party label each candidate would have run under if given the option.

=== Declared ===
- Bryan Chehock, federal attorney (No party preference)
- Pete Hardin, attorney (Democratic)
- Michael A. Jacobs, attorney (Republican)
- Todd Spitzer, incumbent District Attorney (Republican)

== General election ==
=== Results ===
Orange County, California District Attorney election, 2022
Candidate	Votes	%
Todd Spitzer (incumbent)	352,415	62.49%
Pete Hardin	119,886	21.26%
Bryan Chehock	46,425	8.23%
Michael A. Jacobs	45,190	8.01%
Total votes	563,916	100.00%

=== Results by county supervisorial district ===
District	Bryan Chehock		Pete Hardin		Michael A. Jacobs		Todd Spitzer		Vote margin		Total
District	#	%	#	%	#	%	#	%	#	%	Total
1	10,466	8.52%	23,013	18.73%	9,344	7.61%	80,033	65.14%	57,020	46.41%	122,856
2	5,705	9.18%	13,376	21.52%	6,519	10.49%	36,554	58.81%	23,178	37.29%	62,154
3	11,243	8.04%	28,529	20.39%	10,960	7.83%	89,176	63.74%	60,647	43.35%	139,908
4	8,002	9.47%	15,548	18.41%	6,949	8.23%	53,955	63.89%	38,407	45.48%	84,454
5	11,009	7.13%	39,420	25.53%	11,022	7.14%	92,697	60.03%	53,277	34.50%	154,418
Totals	46,425	8.23%	119,886	21.26%	45,190	8.01%	352,415	62.49%	232,529	41.23%	563,916
