= 2022 Little Rock mayoral election =

- November 8, 2022
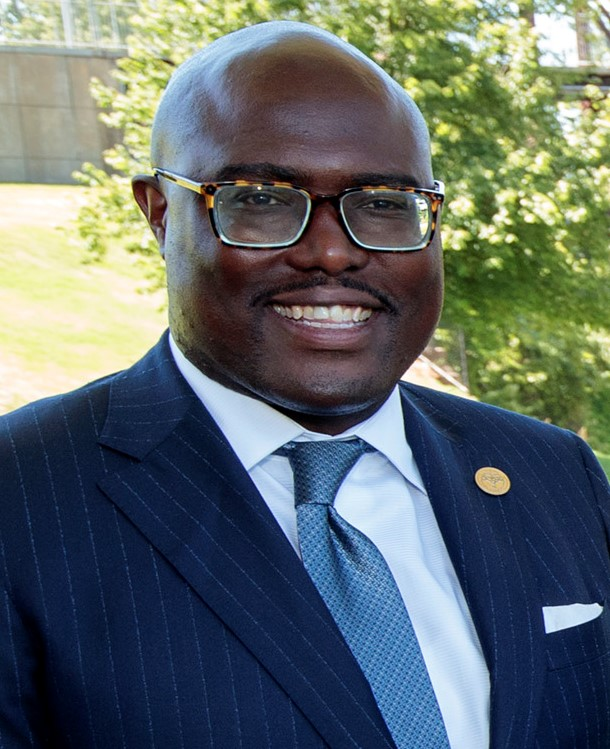

Candidate	Frank Scott Jr.	Steve Landers
Party	Nonpartisan	Nonpartisan
Popular vote	31,680	25,879
Percentage	49.79%	40.67%
Mayor before election
Frank Scott Jr.
Nonpartisan
Elected Mayor
Frank Scott Jr.
Nonpartisan

The 2022 Little Rock mayoral election took place on November 8, 2022. Incumbent Mayor Frank Scott Jr. ran for re-election to a second term. He was challenged by businessman Steve Landers, the owner of the state's largest chain of car dealerships. Scott won re-election, receiving 49.8 percent of the vote to Landers's 40 percent, avoiding the need for a runoff election.

== General election ==
=== Candidates ===
- Frank Scott Jr., incumbent Mayor
- Steve Landers, businessman, car dealership owner
- Greg Henderson, small business advocate
- Glen Schwarz, perennial candidate

=== Results ===
2022 Little Rock mayoral election results
Party	Candidate	Votes	%
Nonpartisan	Frank Scott Jr. (inc.)	31,680	49.79%
Nonpartisan	Steve Landers	25,879	40.67%
Nonpartisan	Greg Henderson	5,069	7.97%
Nonpartisan	Glen Schwarz	1,001	1.57%
Total votes		63,629	100.00%
