= Barbara Buffaloe =

American politician

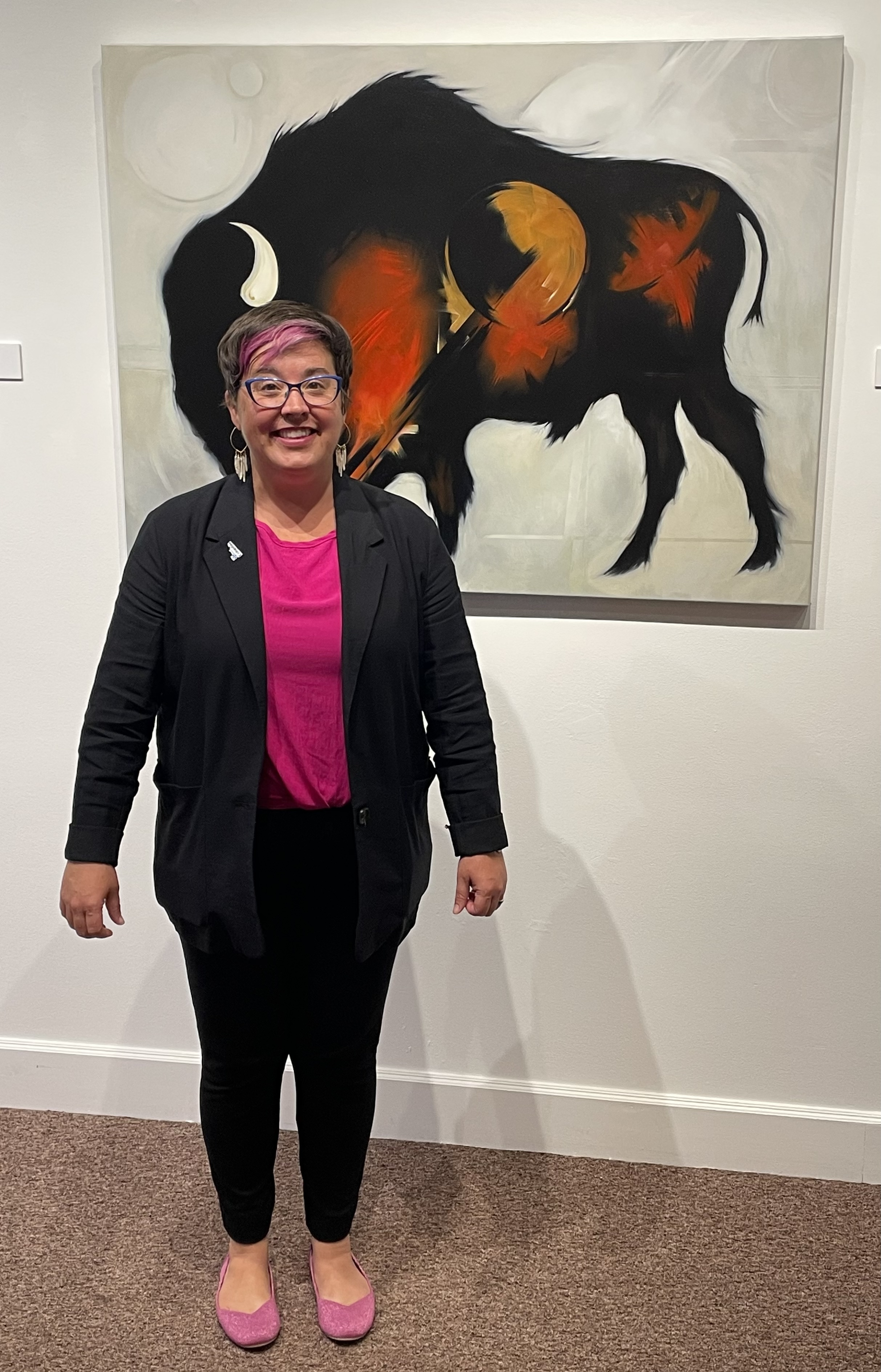

Mayor of Columbia, Missouri
- Incumbent
- Assumed office April 18, 2022
- Preceded by: Brian Treece

Personal details
- Born: November 2, 1980 (age 45)
- Party: Democratic
- Spouse: Luke Buffaloe
- Education: University of Missouri
- Website: www.como.gov (government) buffaloeformayor.com (campaign)

Barbara Buffaloe (born November 2, 1980) is an American politician. She is serving her second term as the mayor of Columbia, Missouri and chair of the Columbia City Council. She was re-elected as mayor in the 2025 mayoral elections

== Career ==
Following her graduation from the University of Missouri, she worked as an architect in the St. Louis, Missouri, area. She then served as the city of Columbia's first sustainability manager between 2010 and 2021. Buffaloe won the 2022 Columbia, Missouri mayoral election, defeating opponent Randy Minchew with a plurality of the vote, totaling 43 percent. She was re-elected in 2025 with 55 percent of the citywide vote. She is the city's second female mayor, and, with her election, women outnumber men on the city council for the first time in history.

Buffaloe and former mayor Mary Anne McCollum shared the stage at the Missouri Theatre in the inaugural "That's What She Said Columbia" event held on April 15, 2023. She is currently the chair of the Environment Committee of the United States Conference of Mayors.

Buffaloe approved pay increases for the Columbia Police Department after first taking office. In December 2023, her tenure oversaw the selection and swearing-in of Jill Schlude, Columbia's first female chief of police. Schlude served as the Columbia Police Department's assistant chief prior to being selected for her new role. Buffaloe also named D'Markus Thomas-Brown as the city's first administrator of the Office of Violence Prevention in March 2025 in the hopes of decreasing crime rates in Columbia.

In 2025, Buffaloe ran for re-election; she faced two ballot-qualifying challengers and a write-in candidate. Buffaloe's challengers were paint store owner Blair "Murph" Murphy and Missouri School of Journalism professor Tanya Heath. She won re-election to a second term in the mayor's office with 55 percent of the vote, expanding her margin of victory from her first election.

Following her reelection in 2025, that June, Buffaloe issued an official proclamation at the annual Mid-Missouri Pride Fest declaring the month of June as Pride Month in the city. That same month, Columbia became the first city in Missouri to recognize Self-Directed Supports for individuals with disabilities. Under Buffaloe's leadership, the Columbia City Council undertook a series of meetings aimed at addressing a potential $48.2 million loss in federal funding to the city, resulting from various executive orders enacted during the second term of U.S. President Donald Trump .

== Personal life ==
Originally from Springfield, Illinois, Buffaloe has resided in the Columbia, Missouri area for over two decades.

She attended the University of Missouri, where she was a student of architectural studies.

She is married to MU Health Care physician Dr. Lucas "Luke" Buffaloe. The couple have two children.

She is an active member of her local Rotary Club.

== See also ==
- List of mayors of Columbia, Missouri

Political offices
| Preceded by Brian Treece | Mayor of Columbia; 2022–present | Incumbent |
