= 2022 Denton mayoral election =

- May 7, 2022
Candidate	Gerard Hudspeth	Paul Meltzer
Party	Nonpartisan	Nonpartisan
Popular vote	8,290	7,638
Percentage	52.05%	47.95%
- Precinct results Hudspeth: 50–60% 60–70% 70–80% 80–90% >90% Meltzer: 50–60% 60–70% 70–80% 80–90% Tie: 50% No votes
Mayor before election
Gerard Hudspeth
Elected mayor
Gerard Hudspeth

The 2022 Denton mayoral election was held on May 7, 2022, to elect the mayor of the city of Denton in the U.S. state of Texas. The election was nonpartisan, so both candidates appeared as independent on the ballot. Denton mayors have two-year terms.

Incumbent Mayor Gerard Hudspeth won re-election to his second term, defeating mayor pro tempore and at-large city council member Paul Meltzer in the May election by a close four-point margin.

== Candidates ==
- Gerard Hudspeth, mayor since 2020, former city council member, businessman
- Paul Meltzer, current mayor pro tem and at-large city council member since 2018, businessman
