= City Hall (Columbia, Missouri) =

Coordinates: 38°57′6.95″N 92°19′43.99″W

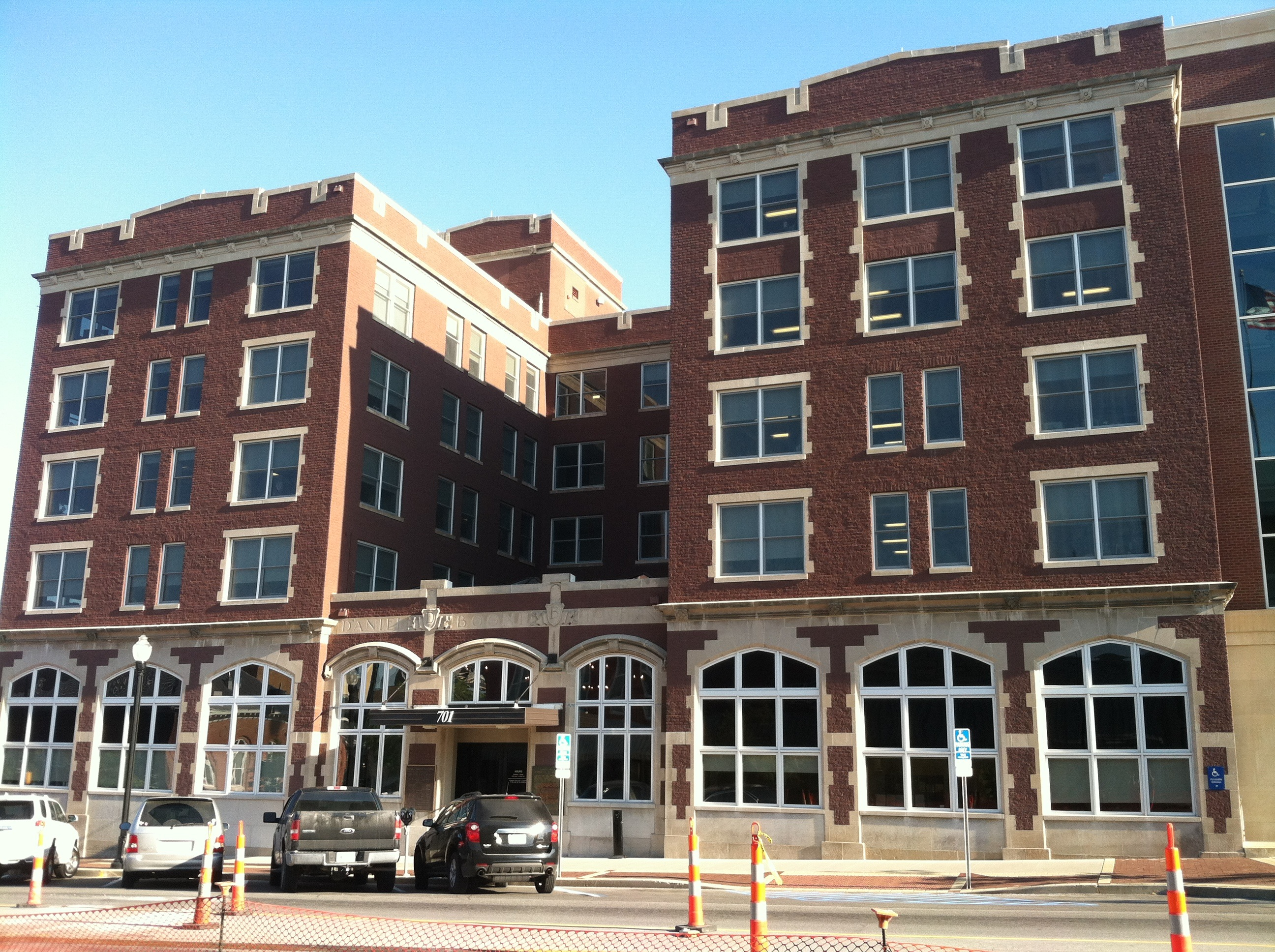
The 1917 structure restored

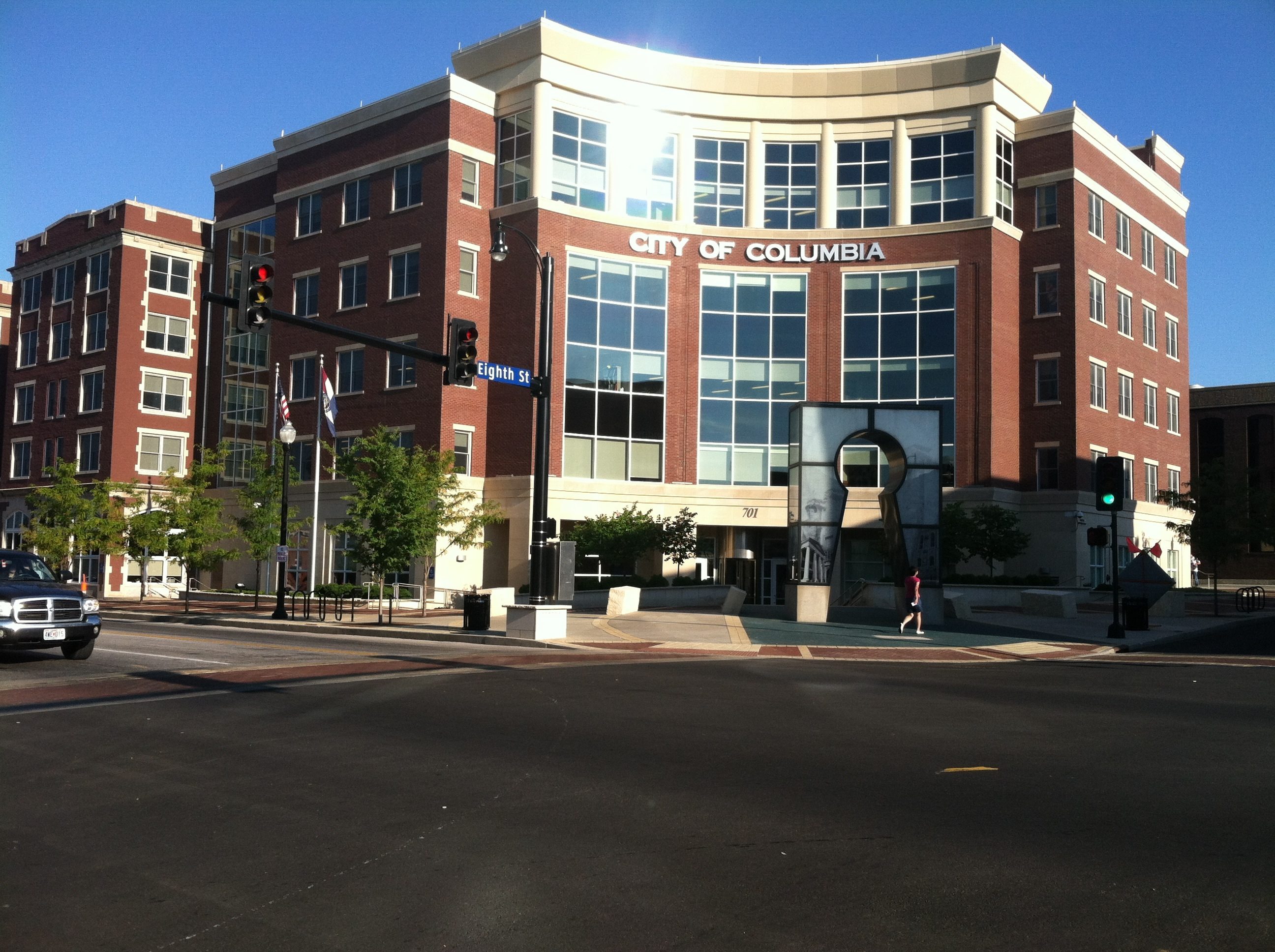
The 2011 addition and public art

City Hall in Columbia, Missouri, also known as the Daniel Boone Building, was built in 1917. A major addition and restoration was completed in 2011, along with a matching five-story structure. Originally built as a hotel, it has functioned as the city hall of Columbia since 1972 by (respectively) replacing the municipal building across the street. The building is a contributing property on the National Register of Historic Places in the Downtown Columbia, Missouri historic district and is at the intersection of Broadway and the Avenue of the Columns. The chambers of the Columbia City Council are on the ground floor.

== See also ==
- List of mayors of Columbia, Missouri
