= Brian Treece =

American politician

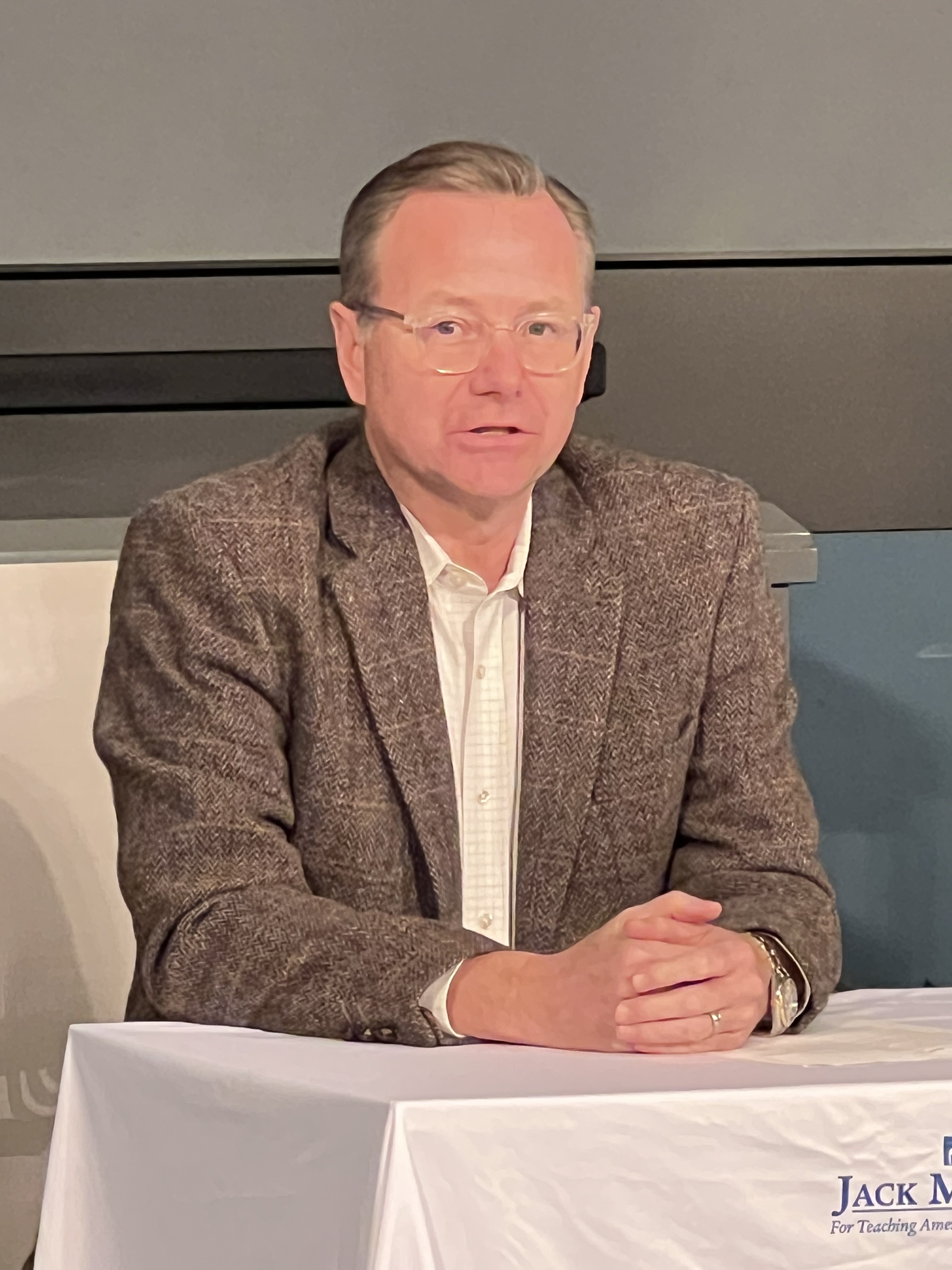

Mayor of Columbia, Missouri
- In office April 18, 2016 – April 18, 2022
- Preceded by: Robert McDavid
- Succeeded by: Barbara Buffaloe

Personal details
- Born: May 11, 1969 (age 56)
- Spouse: Mary Phillips (m. 2011)
- Children: 1
- Education: University of Missouri
- Website: www.como.gov (government) www.treeceformayor.com (campaign)

Brian Treece (born May 11, 1969) is an American politician who was the Mayor of Columbia, Missouri, serving two consecutive terms in office from 2016 to 2022. Before becoming mayor Treece was chairman of the Downtown Leadership Council and served on the city's Historic Preservation Commission. He and his wife Mary Phillips founded the lobbying firm TreecePhillips in Jefferson City, Missouri. In 2011, they married at their home in Columbia. In the 2016 municipal election he defeated lawyer Skip Walther. In the April 2, 2019 mayoral election he defeated former Missouri State Representative Chris Kelly. He was an advocate for transparency in government and called for a city-wide audit. Treece announced the hiring of Columbia's newest city manager John Glascock on July 15, 2019. He has described himself as a "fiscal conservative." As Mayor, he served as chair of the Columbia City Council. He did not seek reelection in the 2022 election.

== See also ==
- List of mayors of Columbia, Missouri

Political offices
Preceded by Bob McDavid	Mayor of Columbia; 2016–2022	Succeeded by Barbara Buffaloe
