= Columbia City Council =

Lawmaking body of Columbia, Missouri, US

Coordinates: 38°57′6.94″N 92°19′44.39″W

The Columbia City Council is the lawmaking body of the city of Columbia, Missouri. It has seven elected members, including the Mayor of Columbia. Each member represents one of the city's six wards, except the mayor who is elected by city-wide vote. Council members are elected for three-year terms. Elections are held annually, as the terms are staggered.

In addition to lawmaking, the main duties of the council include hiring a city manager and appointing citizens to boards and commissions; of which there are 57 as of 2019. The council members receive a stipend; however, there is ongoing debate over making members full-time city employees.

The council meets in Columbia's City Hall, also known as the Daniel Boone Building.

== Membership ==
The most recent municipal election was in April 2025. Since 2022, De'Carlon Seewood has served as city manager, hired by the council.

Ward / Position	Map	Member	Took office	Current term expires
Mayor		Barbara Buffaloe	2022	2028
Ward 1		Valerie Carroll	2024	2029
Ward 2		Vera Elwood	2025	2027
Ward 3		Jacque Sample	2025	2028
Ward 4		Sharon Jones	2026	2028
Ward 5		Christina Hartman	2026	2029
Ward 6		Betsy Peters	2015	2027

== See also ==
- List of mayors of Columbia, Missouri
- History of Columbia, Missouri
- Board of Aldermen of the City of St. Louis
- Kansas City, Missouri City Council
