= Pete Saenz =

American politician

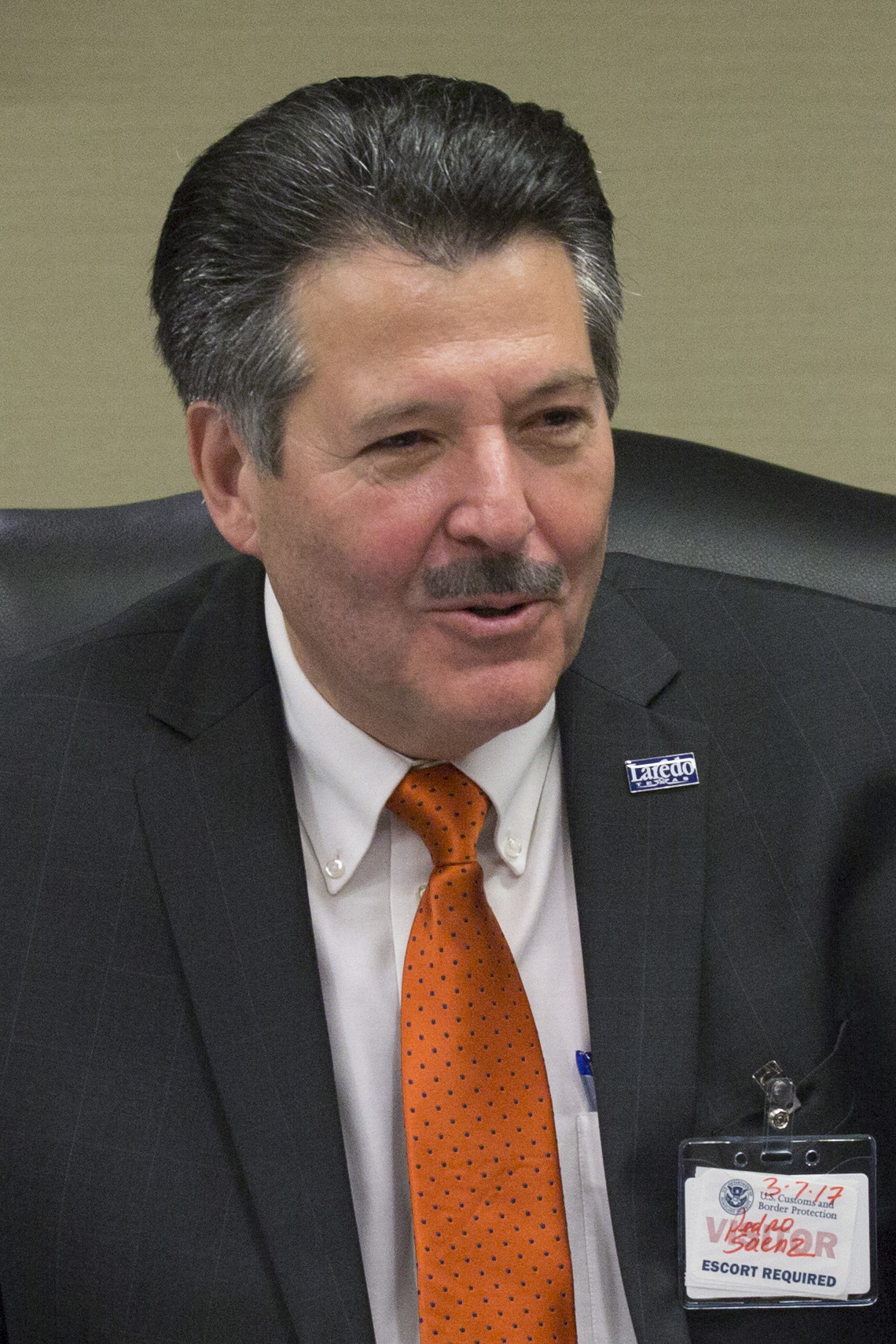
- Saenz in 2017

Mayor of Laredo, Texas
- In office November 12, 2014 – December 28, 2022
- Preceded by: Raúl González Salinas
- Succeeded by: Victor Treviño

Personal details
- Born: Pedro Ignacio Saenz Jr. October 29, 1951 (age 74) Laredo, Texas, U.S.
- Party: Democratic
- Spouse: Minerva Cadena
- Children: 3
- Education: St. Joseph's Academy; Texas A&M University–Kingsville; St. Mary's University School of Law
- Profession: Lawyer

Pedro Ignacio "Pete" Saenz Jr. (born October 29, 1951) is an American attorney and politician who served as the mayor of Laredo, Texas, a position which he assumed on November 12, 2014. He was term-limited and left the position on December 28, 2022.

== Family background ==
Pete Saenz was born to Pedro Ignacio Saenz and Maria del Refugio (née Martinez) Saenz. Pete Saenz has two living siblings. Another sister is deceased.

== Education ==
Saenz was educated at the Roman Catholic St. Joseph's Academy in Laredo. He thereafter obtained Bachelor of Science and Master of Science degrees in Animal Science and Range Management, respectively, from Texas A&M University–Kingsville, then known as Texas A&I University, located near Corpus Christi in Kingsville.

== Community life ==
For twelve years, Saenz was a member of the Laredo Community College board of trustees. He also served a stint as the board president. During his tenure on the board, the South Campus was established, and most buildings on the main campus on West Washington Street were renovated. He is a former president of the South Texas Food Bank and the Laredo Affordable Housing Corporation.

== 2018 mayoral election ==
A third mayoral candidate was current city councilman Carlos Alberto "Charlie" San Miguel (born February 29, 1968). Saenz then handily won the runoff contest with 13,972 votes (64.5 percent) to Vela's 7,694 (35.5 percent).

Preceded by Raúl González Salinas	Mayor of Laredo, Texas; 2014–2022	Succeeded by Victor Trevino
