= National Register of Historic Places listings in Pike County, Missouri =

Location of Pike County in Missouri

This is a list of the National Register of Historic Places listings in Pike County, Missouri.

This is intended to be a complete list of the properties and districts on the National Register of Historic Places in Pike County, Missouri, United States. Latitude and longitude coordinates are provided for many National Register properties and districts; these locations may be seen together in a map.

There are 21 properties and districts listed on the National Register in the county, including 1 National Historic Landmark.

This National Park Service list is complete through NPS recent listings posted March 14, 2025.

== Current listings ==
	Name on the Register	Image	Date listed	Location	City or town	Description
1	Charles Bacon House	Charles Bacon House	July 19, 1990 (#90001104)	819 Kentucky St. 39°26′57″N 91°03′13″W	Louisiana	
2	Capt. George and Attella Barnard House	Capt. George and Attella Barnard House	March 31, 2000 (#00000309)	2009/2109 Georgia St. 39°26′32″N 91°03′53″W	Louisiana	
3	Bethel Chapel AME Church	Bethel Chapel AME Church	July 28, 1995 (#95000926)	Junction of 6th and Tennessee Sts. 39°26′58″N 91°03′02″W	Louisiana	
4	City Market	City Market	March 23, 2005 (#05000203)	125 S. Main St. 39°27′06″N 91°02′46″W	Louisiana	
5	James Beauchamp Clark House	James Beauchamp Clark House	December 8, 1976 (#76001114)	204 E. Champ Clark Dr. 39°20′29″N 91°11′27″W	Bowling Green	
6	Clarksville Historic District	Clarksville Historic District	May 9, 1991 (#91000489)	Roughly bounded by Lewis, Front, Virginia and 3rd Sts. 39°22′11″N 90°54′16″W	Clarksville	
7	Clifford-Wyrick House	Clifford-Wyrick House	July 9, 1984 (#84002600)	105 S. 2nd St. 39°22′13″N 90°54′18″W	Clarksville	
8	Georgia Street Historic District	Georgia Street Historic District	May 6, 1987 (#87000653)	Roughly Georgia St. between Main and Seventh Sts. 39°26′57″N 91°02′56″W	Louisiana	
9	Goodman-Stark House	Goodman-Stark House	October 22, 1994 (#94001205)	601 N. Third St. 39°27′14″N 91°03′00″W	Louisiana	
10	Griffith-McCune Farmstead Historic District	Griffith-McCune Farmstead Historic District	August 18, 1992 (#92001001)	MO WW E of junction with MO D 39°17′20″N 90°58′17″W	Eolia	
11	Lock and Dam No. 24 Historic District	Lock and Dam No. 24 Historic District	March 10, 2004 (#04000183)	350 N. 1st St. 39°22′36″N 90°54′30″W	Clarksville	
12	Louisiana Chicago & Alton Railroad Depot	Louisiana Chicago & Alton Railroad Depot	June 7, 2006 (#06000472)	801 S. Third St. 39°26′49″N 91°02′38″W	Louisiana	
13	Louisiana Public Library	Louisiana Public Library	April 12, 1996 (#96000401)	121 N. 3rd St. 39°27′02″N 91°02′51″W	Louisiana	
14	Luce-Dyer House	Luce-Dyer House	September 23, 1982 (#82003157)	220 N. 3rd St. 39°27′04″N 91°02′54″W	Louisiana	
15	Meloan, Cummins & Co., General Store	Meloan, Cummins & Co., General Store	June 24, 1993 (#93000571)	Junction of Middle and Water Sts., NW corner 39°15′45″N 90°54′02″W	Paynesville	
16	North Third Street Historic District	North Third Street Historic District	August 24, 2005 (#05000912)	Roughly bounded by Georgia, Noyes, North Third and North Water Sts. 39°27′14″N 91°02′56″W	Louisiana	
17	Northern Methodist Episcopal Church of Clarksville	Northern Methodist Episcopal Church of Clarksville	May 9, 1991 (#91000487)	309 Smith St. 39°22′03″N 90°54′14″W	Clarksville	
18	Pike County Hospital	Pike County Hospital	September 19, 2006 (#06000862)	2407 West Georgia St. 39°26′32″N 91°03′52″W	Louisiana	
19	St. John's Episcopal Church	St. John's Episcopal Church	July 8, 1970 (#70000346)	0.25 miles N of Eolia on CR D, 0.25 miles E on CR H 39°14′58″N 91°00′29″W	Eolia	
20	Gov. Lloyd Crow Stark House and Carriage House	Gov. Lloyd Crow Stark House and Carriage House	December 21, 1987 (#87002142)	1401 Georgia St. 39°26′40″N 91°03′30″W	Louisiana	
21	Turner-Pharr House	Turner-Pharr House	May 9, 1991 (#91000488)	101 N. Fourth St. 39°22′11″N 90°54′25″W	Clarksville	

== See also ==
- List of National Historic Landmarks in Missouri
- National Register of Historic Places listings in Missouri
