= Griffith House =

Griffith House or Griffiths House may refer to:

- Robert G. Griffith Sr. House, Summit, Alabama, listed on the NRHP in Alabama
- Bateman-Griffith House, Clarendon, Arkansas, listed on the NRHP in Arkansas
- Griffith House (Penryn, California), listed on the NRHP in California
- Griffiths House (Opa-Locka, Florida), listed on the NRHP in Florida
- John W. Griffiths Mansion, Chicago, Illinois, listed on the NRHP in Illinois
- Pierson-Griffiths House, Indianapolis, Indiana, listed on the NRHP in Indiana
- E. H. Gibbs House, in Oskaloosa, Iowa, also known as Griffith Hall
- Griffith-Franklin House, Calhoun, Kentucky, listed on the NRHP in Kentucky
- D. W. Griffith House, La Grange, Kentucky, listed on the NRHP in Kentucky
- Griffith House (Midway, Kentucky), listed on the NRHP in Kentucky
- Griffith House (Aberdeen, Maryland), listed on the NRHP in Maryland
- Griffith-McCune Farmstead Historic District, Eolia, Missouri, listed on the NRHP in Missouri
- James Griffith House, Canal Winchester, Ohio, listed on the NRHP in Ohio
- William R. Griffith House, Harrisburg, Pennsylvania, listed on the NRHP in Pennsylvania
- David Jefferson Griffith House, Gilbert, South Carolina, listed on the NRHP in South Carolina
- James Turk Griffith House, Ten Mile, Tennessee, listed on the NRHP in Tennessee
- Jenner-Griffiths House, Minersville, Utah, listed on the NRHP in Utah
- J. W. Griffiths House, Port Townsend, Washington, listed on the NRHP in Washington
- Griffiths House (Alice Springs), a Methodist children's home and hostel in Australia
