= Third Street Historic District =

Third Street Historic District may refer to:

- Third Street Historic District (Milton, Kentucky), listed on the National Register of Historic Places in Trimble County, Kentucky
- Third Street Historic District (Pikeville, Kentucky), listed on the National Register of Historic Places in Pike County, Kentucky
- North Third Street Historic District (Louisiana, Missouri), listed on the National Register of Historic Places in Pike County, Missouri
- North Third Street Historic District (Milwaukee, Wisconsin), listed on the National Register of Historic Places in Milwaukee County, Wisconsin
- Old World Third Street Historic District, listed on the National Register of Historic Places in Milwaukee County, Wisconsin
- South Third Street Historic District (Chipley, Florida), listed on the National Register of Historic Places in Washington County, Florida
- South Third Street Historic District (Lafayette, Indiana)
- West Third Street Historic District (Davenport, Iowa), listed on the National Register of Historic Places in Scott County, Iowa
- West Third Street Historic District (Dayton, Ohio), listed on the National Register of Historic Places in Montgomery County, Ohio
- East Third Street Residential Historic District, listed on the National Register of Historic Places in Bayfield County, Wisconsin
