= McKown =

McKown is a surname. Notable people with the surname include:

- Ben McKown (born 1957), American tennis player
- Hunter McKown (born 2002), American ice hockey player
- Robin McKown (1907—1975), American writer of young adult literature
