= Meloan =

Meloan is a surname. Notable people with the surname include:

- Jon Meloan (born 1984), American baseball player
- Paul Meloan (1888–1950), American baseball player
- Richard Meloan Duncan (1889–1974), American judge
