= Robert G. Griffith Sr. House =

Historic house in Alabama, United States

- U.S. National Register of Historic Places
- Alabama Register of Landmarks and Heritage
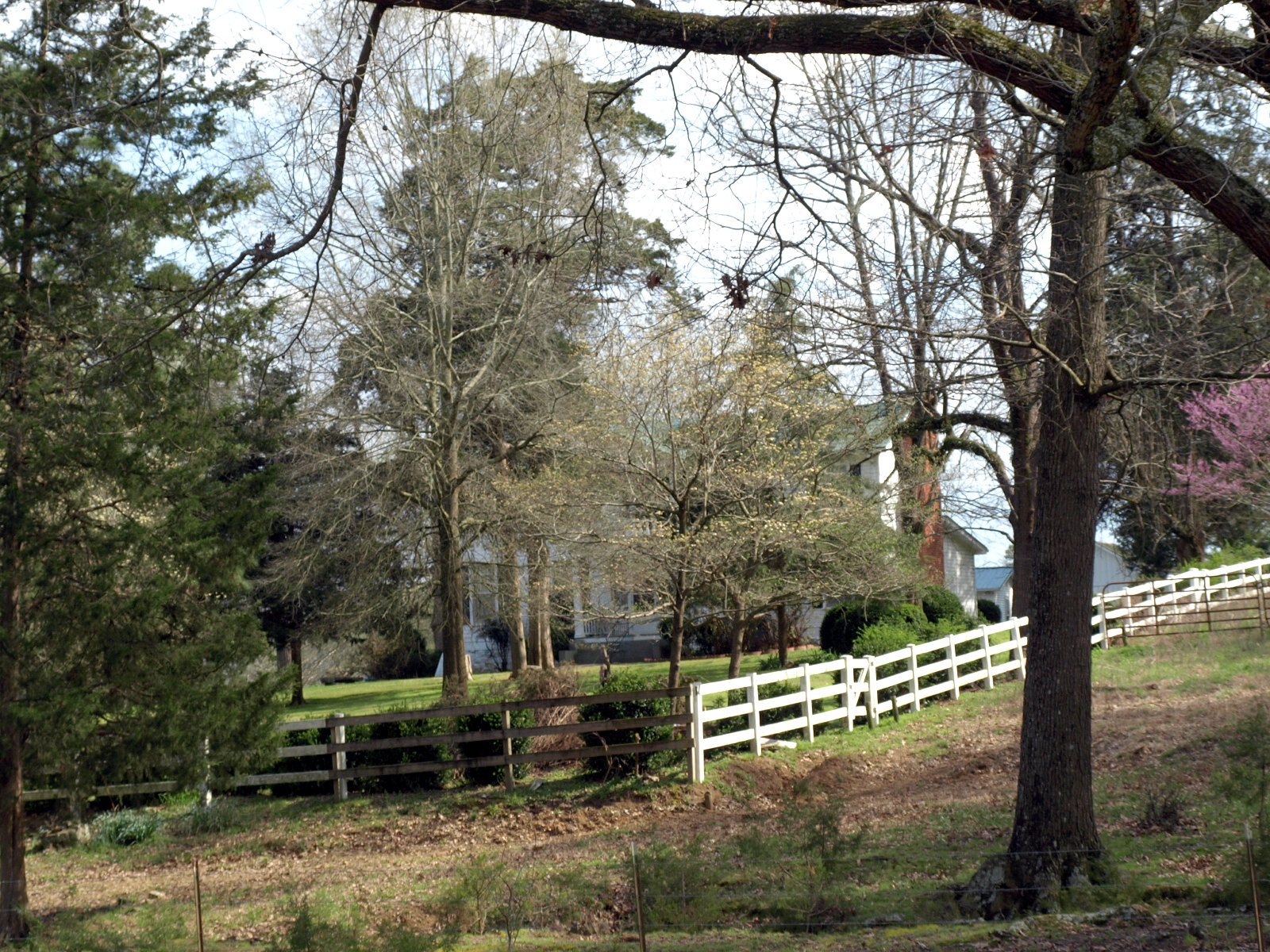
- The house in April 2015

- Location within Alabama Location within the United States
- Nearest city: Summit, Alabama
- Coordinates: 34°12′38″N 86°28′38″W
- Area: 70 acres (28 ha)
- Built by: Joseph Britton
- Architectural style: I-house
- NRHP reference No.: 00000143

Significant dates
- Added to NRHP: March 14, 2000
- Designated ARLH: June 30, 1995

The Robert G. Griffith Sr. House is a historic house near Summit, Alabama, United States. As the only surviving early I-house in Blount County, the dwelling is representative of the residence of a financially comfortable agricultural family in the Appalachian region of Alabama. It was added to the Alabama Register of Landmarks and Heritage on June 30, 1995, and to the National Register of Historic Places on March 14, 2000.

== History ==
Pennsylvania-born and Welsh-descended Robert Griffin Griffith (1801–1856) became one of the first permanent settlers in Alabama after the Cherokee Removal. He eventually married Mary E. Vanzant of Franklin County, Tennessee, and became the postmaster of Summit in July 1846. By 1850, Griffith owned 400 acres (160 ha) of farmland. The house was completed in 1851 by mechanic Joseph Britton with the aid of a “Mr. Sterling”. Griffith purchased a portable cotton gin shortly before his death in 1856, marking a shift from corn as the farm's primary product. The house remained in the family at least through its NRHP listing in 2000.

== Architecture ==
The two-story I-house was built in 1851. Brick chimneys (rebuilt in the 1940s) buttress the main block, with a third chimney on a rear ell. The center of the five-bay façade has a double height, gable-roofed porch. The sidelights on the main entry door are unusually wide, consisting of two rows of five panes.

The interior of the main block has a center hall plan, with a single room on either side. A steep, enclosed stairway in what was originally the rear porch leads to the second floor. The single-story ell, originally the dining room, was connected via a breezeway to a cookhouse; a porch along the main rear and the ell was enclosed in the early 1900s to create the present dining room and kitchen. The interior exhibits rarely-surviving faux painting on the parlor baseboards and mantel, and on doors throughout the house.
