= Mader's Restaurant =

Restaurant in Milwaukee, Wisconsin, US

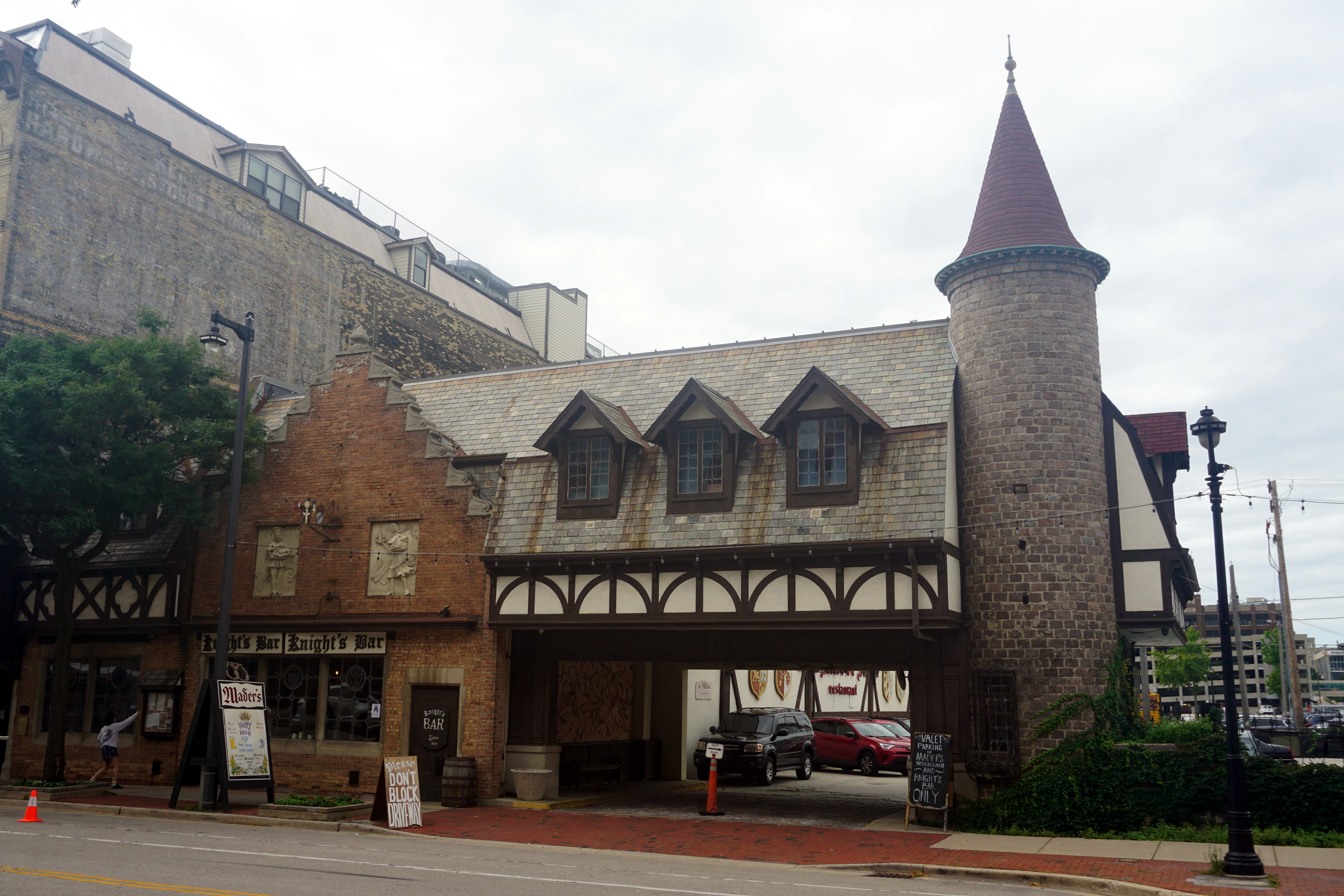

- Location within Wisconsin Location within the United States

Restaurant information
- Established: 1902
- Food type: German
- Location: 1041 N. Dr. Martin Luther King Jr. Drive, Milwaukee, Wisconsin
- Coordinates: 43.043872°N 87.914886°W
- Website: madersrestaurant.com

Mader's Restaurant is a German restaurant located at 1041 N. Dr. Martin Luther King Jr. Drive in Milwaukee, Wisconsin. Opened in 1902, it is the oldest operating restaurant in Milwaukee. The restaurant's German-inspired building dates to the 1950s and is part of the Old World Third Street Historic District.

== Description ==
The Mader's Restaurant building has a Renaissance Revival design inspired by German architecture. Distinctive elements of the design include wooden half-timbering, a stepped gable, and a brick turret. The interior is decorated with antiques, including a suit of armor, stained glass panels, artwork, and beer steins. The building also includes a bar, named Knight's Bar, and the Tower Galleries art gallery. The restaurant's German dishes include Wiener schnitzel, sauerbraten, pork shank, and potato pancakes.

== History ==
Charles Mader founded the restaurant, which was originally named The Comfort, in 1902. The restaurant was renamed to Mader's in 1912, and it moved to its current location the next year. Though it was primarily known for beer at first, the restaurant focused on German food to survive Prohibition; when Prohibition ended in 1933, it served Milwaukee's first legal beer at midnight. Charles' son Gustave took over operations in 1937. In the early 1950s, Gustave rebuilt the restaurant building into its current German appearance, and he brought his son Victor into its operations in 1964. Mader's became known for hosting celebrity guests in Milwaukee during the mid-20th century, including three U.S. presidents; Gerald Ford visited the restaurant while president, while John F. Kennedy and Ronald Reagan dined there prior to taking office. The restaurant added an art gallery to its building in 1980, and it opened two new private dining rooms in the 1980s. It is currently operated by Kristin Mader, Victor's daughter.
