= Luce-Dyer House =

Historic house in Missouri, United States

- U.S. National Register of Historic Places
- U.S. Historic district – Contributing property
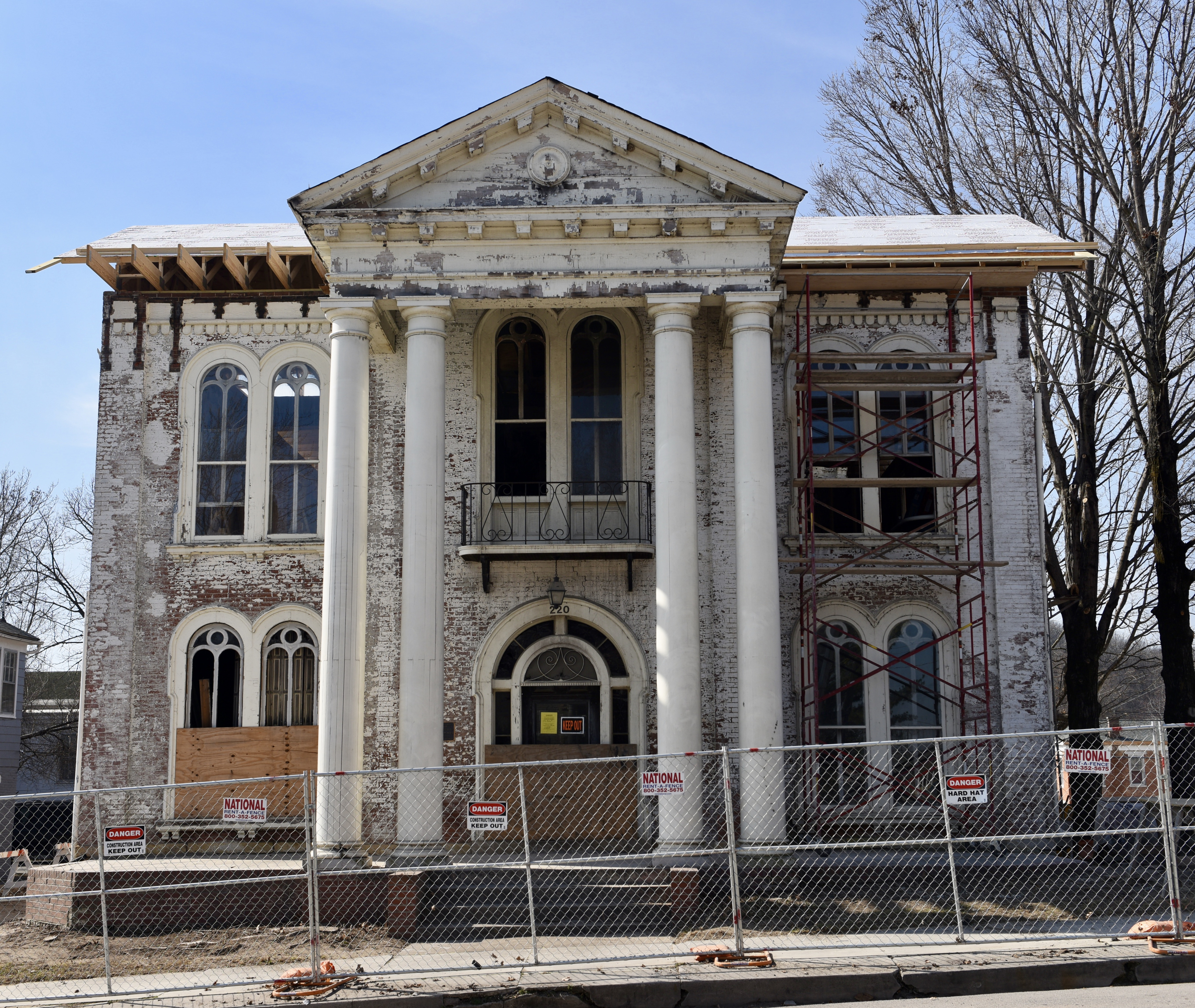

- Location within Missouri Location within the United States
- Location: 220 N. 3rd St. Louisiana, Missouri
- Coordinates: 39°27′4″N 91°2′54″W
- Area: 0.3 acres (0.12 ha)
- Built: c. 1856-1860
- Built by: Ruggles, Levi; Baird, P.H.
- Architectural style: Italianate
- NRHP reference No.: 82003157
- Added to NRHP: September 23, 1982

Luce-Dyer House, also known as the Stark-Carlson House, is a historic home located at Louisiana, Pike County, Missouri. It was built between about 1856 and 1860, and is a two-story, three-bay, Italianate style brick dwelling. It features a bracketed cornice, gabled roofline, five pairs of semi-circular topped windows with oscula, and pedimented Neoclassical front portico added in the 1930s. Also on the property are the contributing garage and cottage.

It was listed on the National Register of Historic Places in 1982. It is located in the North Third Street Historic District.

The house was badly burned in July 2016, but it is still standing and is currently being restored.
