= Blanche Hinman Dow =

American academic administrator (1894–1973)

- Born: February 9, 1894; Louisiana, Missouri
- Died: May 25, 1973
- Known for: President of the American Association of University Women, President of Cottey College

Academic background
- Education: Bachelor's degree from Smith College; Masters and doctorate from Columbia University
- Alma mater: Columbia University

Academic work
- Discipline: French

Blanche Hinman Dow (February 9, 1894 — May 25, 1973) was President of the American Association of University Women (1963–1967) and was President of Cottey College, retiring in 1965 after serving for 16 years.

Dow graduated from Smith College in 1913, continuing her education at Columbia University earning a master's degree and doctorate in French. She went on to serve on the White House Commission on International Cooperation, the National Citizens Committee on Community Relations, and the President's Committee on Employment of the Handicapped.

== Legacy ==
The Dow International Scholarship Fund at Cottey College was established in 1973 in memory of Dow and provides funding for international students.

== Works ==
- The Changing Attitude Toward Women in Fifteenth-Century French Literature (1936)
- Meditations for Women (1949)
