= Usinger's =

American sausage company

Fred Usinger, Inc
- Trade name: Usinger's
- Company type: Private
- Founded: 1880 in Milwaukee, Wisconsin
- Founder: Fred Usinger
- Website: usinger.com

Fred Usinger, Inc., better known as Usinger's, is a sausage-making company located in downtown Milwaukee, Wisconsin, on Old World Third Street within the Old World Third Street Historic District.

== History ==
Fred Usinger, an apprentice sausage maker from Wehen in Germany, immigrated to Milwaukee in the late 1870s. Usinger found work at a small butcher shop on Third Street owned by a Mrs. Julia Gaertner. After approximately a year, Usinger purchased Gartner's business and married her niece, Louise. The couple grew the business and, eventually, their sausage was being shipped nationally.

A distribution center in the Walker's Point neighborhood was opened in 1994. During the 1990s, operational control passed to the fourth generation siblings, Fritz and Debra Usinger.

== Products ==
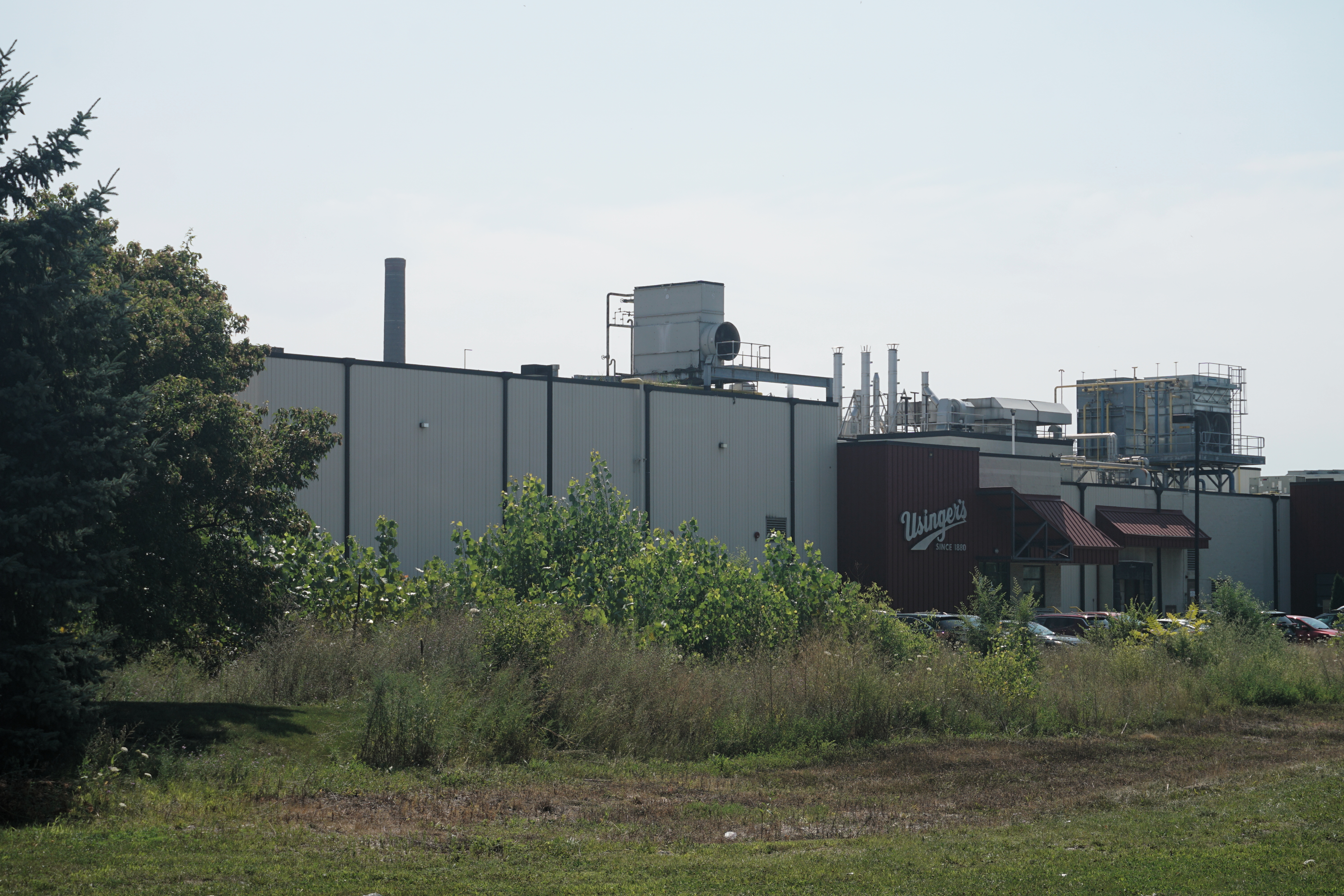
Usinger's Famous Sausage Distribution in Milwaukee

Usinger's produces many kinds of sausages and meats, in many cases using traditional 19th-century recipes.

Michael Bartlett's 1984 book The Book of Bests decreed, "If we were forced to pick just one 'great' hot dog we'd probably go with Usinger's of Milwaukee. Usinger's line of cold cuts reaches heights of quality and flavor rarely achieved in this country." Former New York Times food writer Mimi Sheraton wrote in 1973, "Now, the good news. If ever I decide to move to Milwaukee, it will be because of Usinger's..."
