= George Samuel Clason =

American author (1874–1957)

- Born: 1874; Louisiana, Missouri, U.S.
- Died: 1957 (aged 82–83); Napa, California, U.S.
- Alma mater: University of Nebraska
- Occupations: Author, map publisher
- Writing career
- Notable work: The Richest Man in Babylon

George Samuel Clason (November 7, 1874 – April 7, 1957) was an American author. He is most often associated with his book The Richest Man in Babylon which was first published in 1926.

== Early life and education ==
Clason was born in Louisiana, Missouri. He attended the University of Nebraska. He served in the United States Army during the Spanish–American War.

== Career ==
Clason started two companies, the Clason Map Company of Denver, Colorado and the Clason Publishing Company. The Clason Map Company was the first to publish a road atlas of the United States and Canada, but did not survive the Great Depression.

Clason is best known for writing a series of informational pamphlets about being thrifty and how to achieve financial success. He started writing the pamphlets in 1926, using parables that were set in ancient Babylon. Banks and insurance companies began to distribute the parables, and the most famous ones were compiled into the book The Richest Man in Babylon - The Success Secrets of the Ancients. He is credited with coining the phrase, "Pay yourself first".

== Personal life ==
Clason moved to Denver in 1900. He had two children who were also authors Clyde B. Clason and Robin Clason McKown. He was married twice, to Ida Ann Venable and Anna Burt.

He moved to Napa, California in 1949 and died there on April 7, 1957.
