= Robin McKown =

20th century American woman writer

- Born: Louise Clason; January 27, 1907; Denver or Boulder, Colorado
- Died: August 1975 (aged 68); Beaver Dams, New York
- Occupation: Author
- Parent: George Samuel Clason

Robin McKown (January 27, 1907 — August 1975) was an American writer of young adult literature, chiefly biography and fiction. During and after World War II, she was chair of an organization that helped the widows and orphans of men who had died fighting for the French Resistance. She received the Josette Frank Award for Janine in 1960. The following year she received the Child Study Association Award for the same book.

== Personal life and education ==
Robin McKown was born in Denver or Boulder, Colorado. During her childhood in Denver, she was known as Louise and Louisa Clason. Her parents were Anna and George Samuel Clason, author and cofounder of the Clason Map Company, who settled in Denver in 1900. Her brother Clyde B. Clason was also an author.

McKown earned a bachelor's degree from the University of Colorado before furthering her studies at Northwestern University and the University of Illinois.

She married Dallas McKown, becoming Robin McKown. She died in August 1975 in Beaver Dams, New York.

== Career ==
She worked in both sales promotion and radio scriptwriting and was the author of a column for the Book-of-the-Month Club. She was also a literary agent.

McKown wrote books for young adults, traveling throughout the United States and to the Congo, South Africa, Peru, Ireland, Italy, Madagasgar, and North Africa for research.

== Residency in France ==
During World War II, McKown volunteered with an organization that helped the widows and orphans of men who had died fighting for the French Resistance, spending six weeks in France following the Allied victory in 1945. She was the chairman of the organization known at the Friends of Widows and Orphans of the French Resistance following the war. Formally named The National Association of Families of the Shot and Massacred (Association Nationale des Familles de Fusillés et Massacrés), it was allied with the American Aid to France. The organization was headquartered in New York City, where McKown lived at the time. Packages of food, clothing, toys and medicine were sent to more than 1,000 survivors. Later, she returned to northeastern France and lived there for three years, an experience that inspired the settings for two of her novels, Janine and Patriot of the Underground. After France, she returned to New York City.

== Bibliography ==
McKown's published works include biographies of Eleanor Roosevelt, Thomas Paine, Benjamin Franklin and Marie Curie and more than 40 works for young adults. With Mary Elting Folsom, she co-authored A Mango Homecoming. Some of her works are:

=== Nonfiction ===
- Washington's America (1961)
- Pioneers in Mental Health (1961)
- She Lived for Science (1961)
- Benjamin Franklin (1963)
- Giant of the Atom: Ernest Rutherford (1963)
- The Ordeal of Anne Devlin (1963)
- Seven Famous Trials in History (1963), with William Sharp
- The Fabulous Isotopes (1964), illustrations by Isadore Steinberg
- Mendeleyev: Father of the Periodic Table (1965)
- The American Revolution: The French Allies (1969)
- Lumumba: A Biography (1969)
- The Colonial Conquest of Africa (1971)
- Crisis in South Africa (1971)
- The World of Mary Cassatt (1972)
- The Image of Puerto Rico (1973)
- Nkrumah: A Biography (1973)
- Republic of Zaire (1973)
- The Execution of Maximilian: A Hapsburg Emperor Meets Disaster in the New World (1973)
- Mark Twain: Novelist, Humorist, Satirist, Grassroots Historian, and America's Unpaid Goodwill Ambassador at Large (1974)
- The Opium War in China: 1840-1842 (1975)
- The Resignation of Nixon: A Discredited President Gives Up the Nation's Highest Office (1975)

=== Fiction ===
- Author's Agent (1957)
- Publicity Girl (1958)
- Foreign Service Girl (1960)
- Patriot of the Underground (1964)
- Rakoto and the Drongo Bird (1966)
- Janine (1967)
- The Boy Who Woke Up in Madagascar (1967)
- Girl of Madagascar (1968)

== Legacy ==
McKown's work was compared to that of Horatio Alger known for his contribution to young adult literature. She was noted for her book Giant of the Atom: Ernest Rutherford (1963) written in a "delightful humorous manner" that did not require a comprehensive background in physics to understand.
