= James Beauchamp Clark House =

Historic house in Missouri, United States

- U.S. National Register of Historic Places
- U.S. National Historic Landmark
- James Beauchamp Clark House in 2026

- Location within Missouri Location within the United States
- Location: 204 E. Champ Clark Dr. Bowling Green, Missouri
- Coordinates: 39°20′29″N 91°11′27″W
- Area: less than one acre
- Built: 1888
- Architect: Ezra Kirkland
- NRHP reference No.: 76001114

Significant dates
- Added to NRHP: December 8, 1976
- Designated NHL: December 8, 1976

The James Beauchamp Clark House, also known as "Champ" Clark House or Honey Shuck, is a historic house museum at 207 East Champ Clark Drive in Bowling Green, Missouri, the seat of Pike County. Designated as a National Historic Landmark, it is the only known surviving home of James Beauchamp Clark (1851–1921), a leading US Congressman of the early 20th century. It is regularly open for tours in the summer, and otherwise by appointment.

== Description and history ==
The Clark House is located in a residential area on Bowling Green's east side, on the north side of East Champ Clark Drive between Charles and Penn streets. It is a two-story wood-frame structure, built in 1888 by Ezra Kirkland, with ells projecting north off the northeast and northwest corners. A porch wraps around the front and sides, its flat roof supported by turned columns and jigsawn brackets, with a spindled valance between the posts. The interior has been restored to an appearance consistent with the time of Clark's occupancy.

The house was purchased in 1898 by James Beauchamp Clark, several years after he had been elected to the United States Congress. Rising in the Democratic Party, Clark became first the minority leader of the House of Representatives (1908), and Speaker of the House in 1911, when the Democrats gained control of the body. He was a leading contender for the Democratic Party nomination for president in 1912 but did not get it. Clark served as Speaker of the House until 1919. The next year, he was voted out of office in a Republican landslide in 1920.

After Clark's ownership, the house was converted into multiple residences. In the late 20th century, it was acquired by a local non-profit and restored as a museum.

== See also ==
- List of National Historic Landmarks in Missouri
- National Register of Historic Places listings in Pike County, Missouri
