= James Griffith House =

Historic residence in Canal Winchester, Ohio

- U.S. National Register of Historic Places
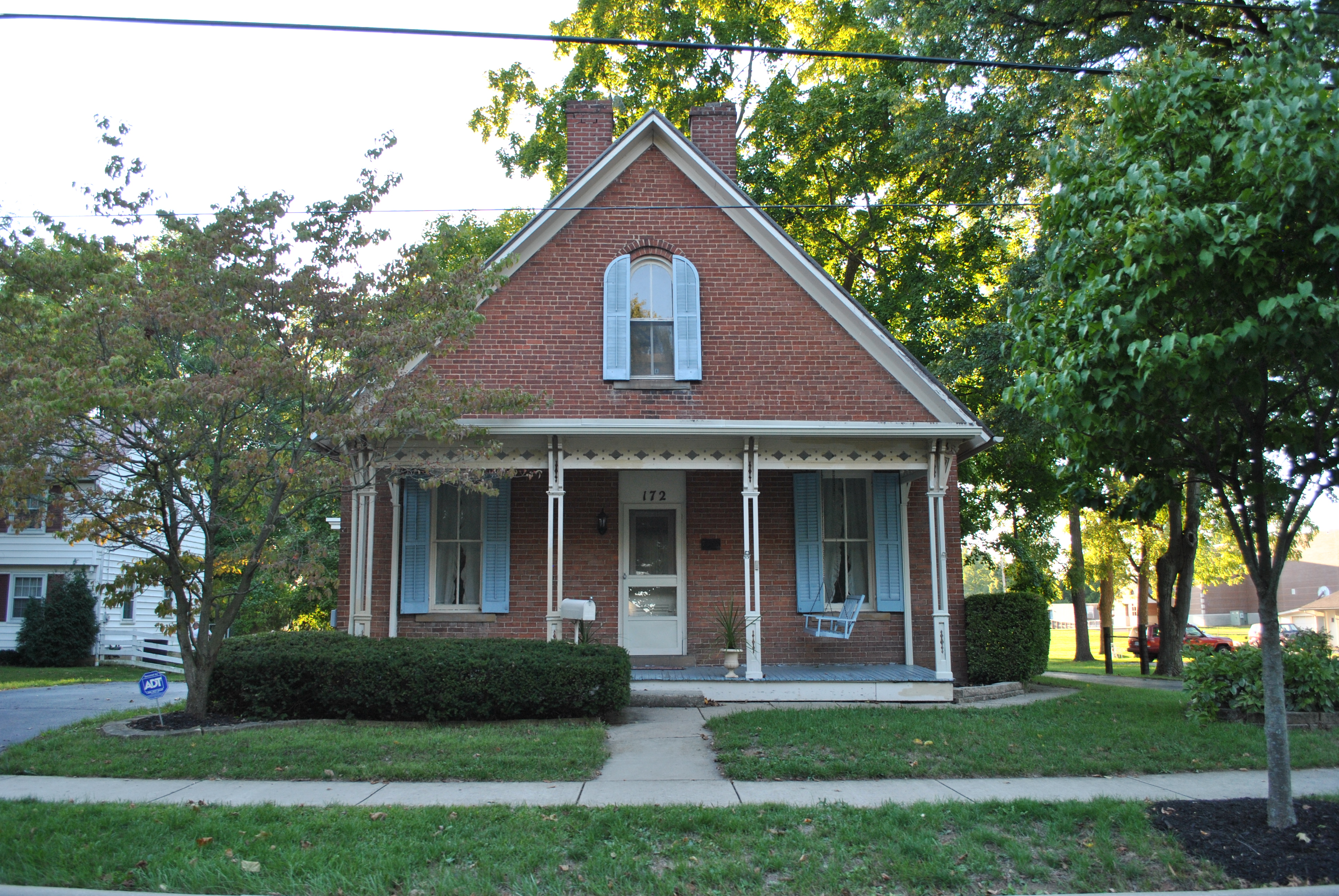
- The James Griffith House in 2012

- Location within Ohio Location within the United States
- Location: 172 Washington St, Canal Winchester, Ohio, U.S.
- Coordinates: 39.8391°N 82.8094°W
- Built by: James Griffith
- NRHP reference No.: 89001019
- Added to NRHP: August 15, 1989

The James Griffith House, sometimes known locally as the Minnie Bishop House, is a historic residence located in Canal Winchester, Ohio. It was listed in the National Register of Historic Places on August 15, 1989.

The home is named after James Griffith, who purchased the land the home is on in 1869. Built sometime between 1869 and 1872, Griffith operated a brickyard at the property until the 1890s. While not confirmed, it is theorized that Griffith manufactured the bricks for and built the house himself. It is occasionally referred to as the Minnie Bishop House because a local school teacher of the same name rented the house in the 1900s.
