= Louisiana station (Missouri) =

- Louisiana Chicago & Alton Railroad Depot
- U.S. National Register of Historic Places
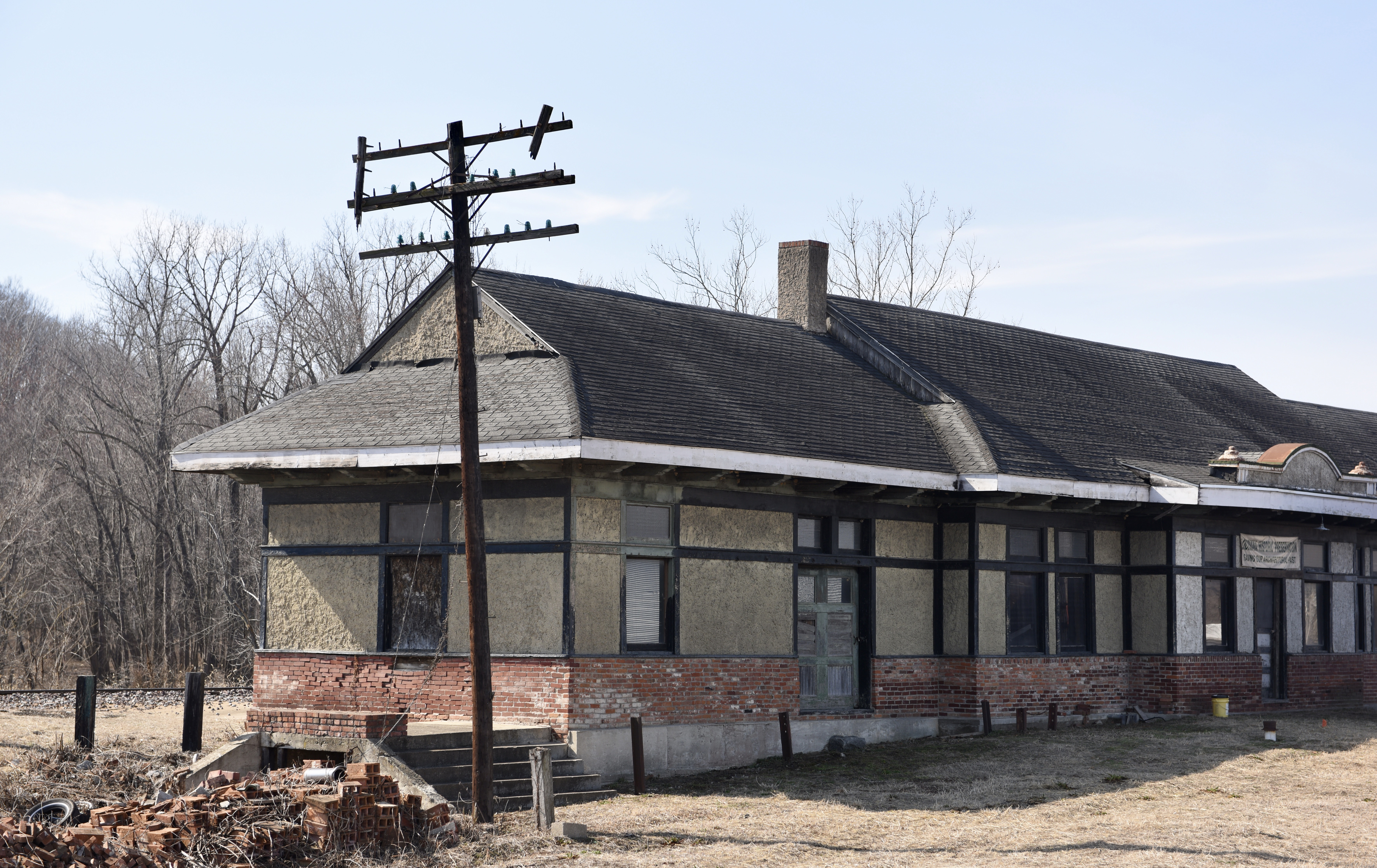

- Location within Missouri Location within the United States
- Location: 801 S. Third St. Louisiana, Missouri
- Coordinates: 39°26′49″N 91°2′38″W
- Area: less than one acre
- Built: 1907-1908
- Architect: McAfee, Matthew Porter
- Architectural style: Mission/spanish Revival
- NRHP reference No.: 06000472
- Added to NRHP: June 7, 2006

Louisiana Chicago & Alton Railroad Depot, also known as the II Central Gulf, Burlington Northern, Gateway Western Railway Depot, is a historic train station located at Louisiana, Pike County, Missouri. It was built in 1907-1908 by the Chicago & Alton Railroad, and is a one-story, Mission Revival style red brick and stucco building. The rectangular building has a gable on hip roof with projected eaves and exposed wooden roof rafter. The depot continued to operate until 1967.

It was listed on the National Register of Historic Places in 2006.
