= Meloan, Cummins & Co., General Store =

- U.S. National Register of Historic Places
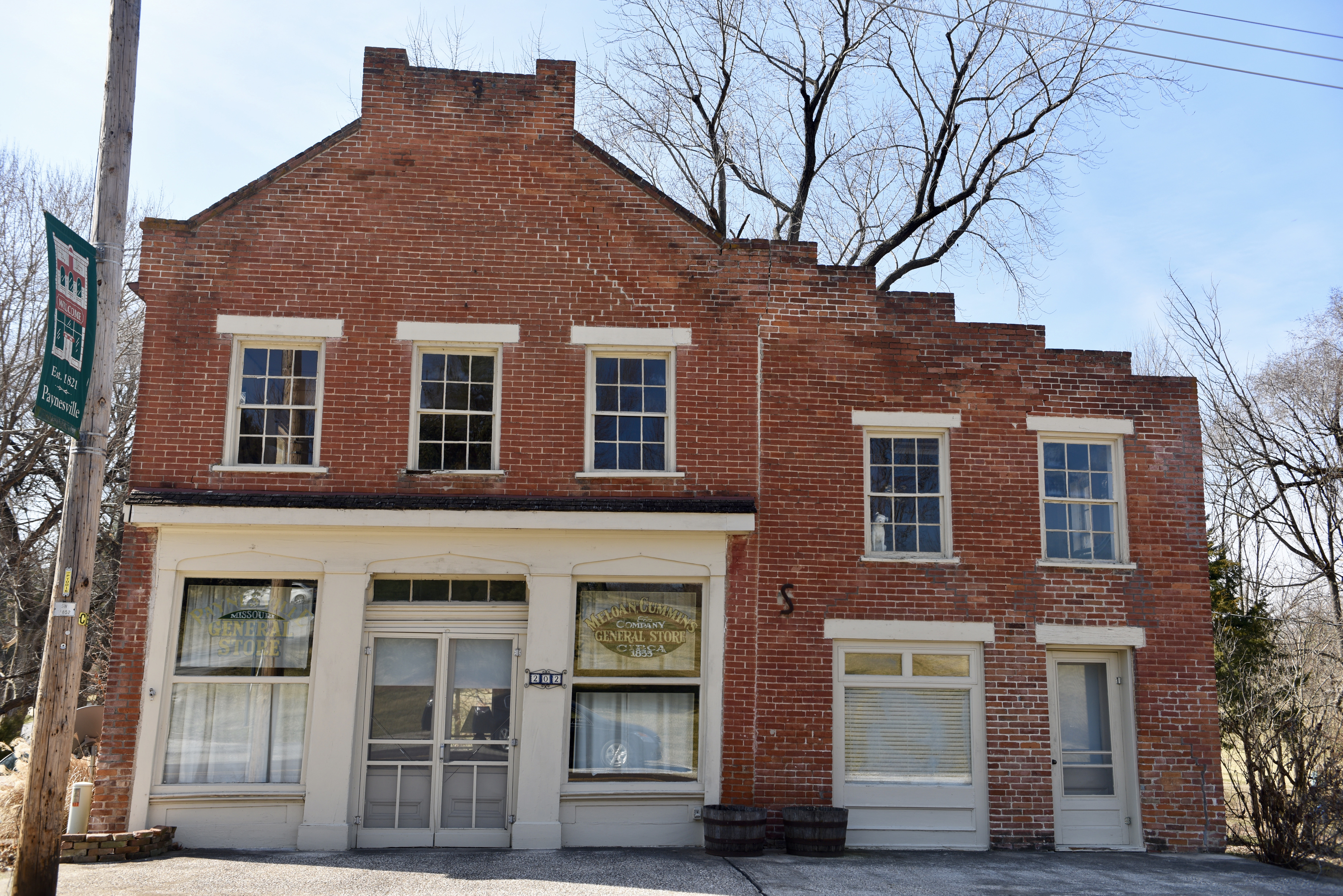

- Location within Missouri Location within the United States
- Location: Jct. of Middle and Water Sts., NW corner, Paynesville, Missouri
- Coordinates: 39°15′45″N 90°54′2″W
- Area: less than one acre
- Built: c. 1857-1865
- Architectural style: Vernacular,
- NRHP reference No.: 93000571
- Added to NRHP: June 24, 1993

Meloan, Cummins & Co., General Store, also known as Meloan & Guy and A.J. Forgey Department Stores, is a historic general store located at Paynesville, Pike County, Missouri. It was built between about 1857 and 1865, and is a two-story, brick commercial / residential building with Federal / Greek Revival style design elements. It sits on a stone foundation and has a front gable roof. It has a two-story, two-bay, brick addition with a stepped parapet.

It was listed on the National Register of Historic Places in 1993.
