= Gov. Lloyd Crow Stark House and Carriage House =

Historic house in Missouri, United States

- U.S. National Register of Historic Places
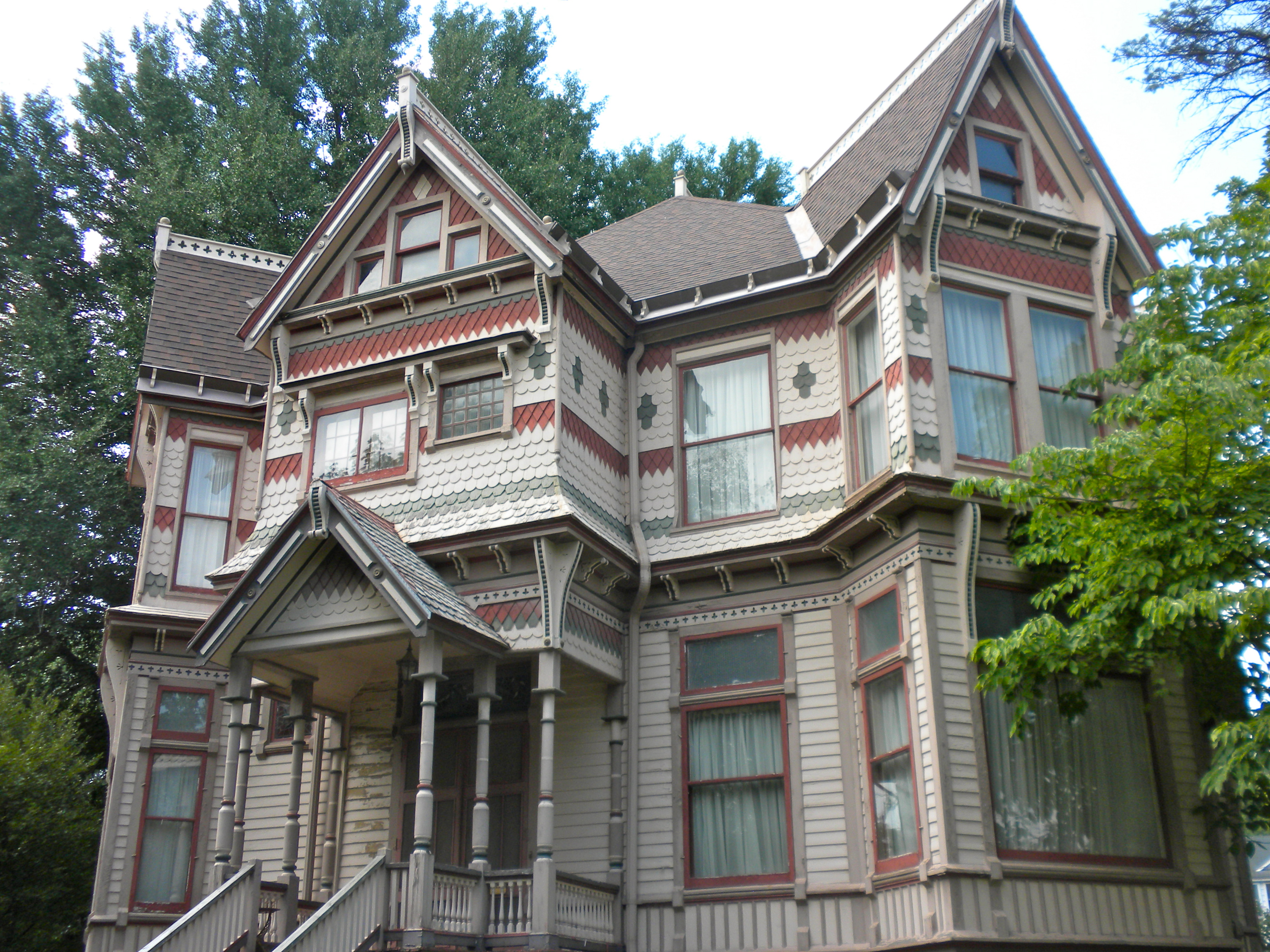
- Gov. Lloyd Crow Stark House, July 2010

- Location within Missouri Location within the United States
- Location: 1401 Georgia St., Louisiana, Missouri
- Coordinates: 39°26′40″N 91°3′30″W
- Area: 3.3 acres (1.3 ha)
- Built: 1891
- Built by: Kuna, Alfred
- Architectural style: Stick/eastlake
- NRHP reference No.: 87002142
- Added to NRHP: December 21, 1987

Gov. Lloyd Crow Stark House and Carriage House, also known as the Stark Mansion, is a historic home located at Louisiana, Pike County, Missouri. It was built in 1891, and is a two-story, Stick / Eastlake movement style brick mansion. It features three two-story bays on the primary facade, and centered, one-story bays on the side elevations, with gable roofs, fishscale shingles, and a decorative front porch. Also on the property is a contributing carriage house. This was the home of Missouri Governor Lloyd Crow Stark from 1915 to 1940.

It was listed on the National Register of Historic Places in 1987.
