= Charles Bacon House =

Historic house in Missouri, United States

- U.S. National Register of Historic Places
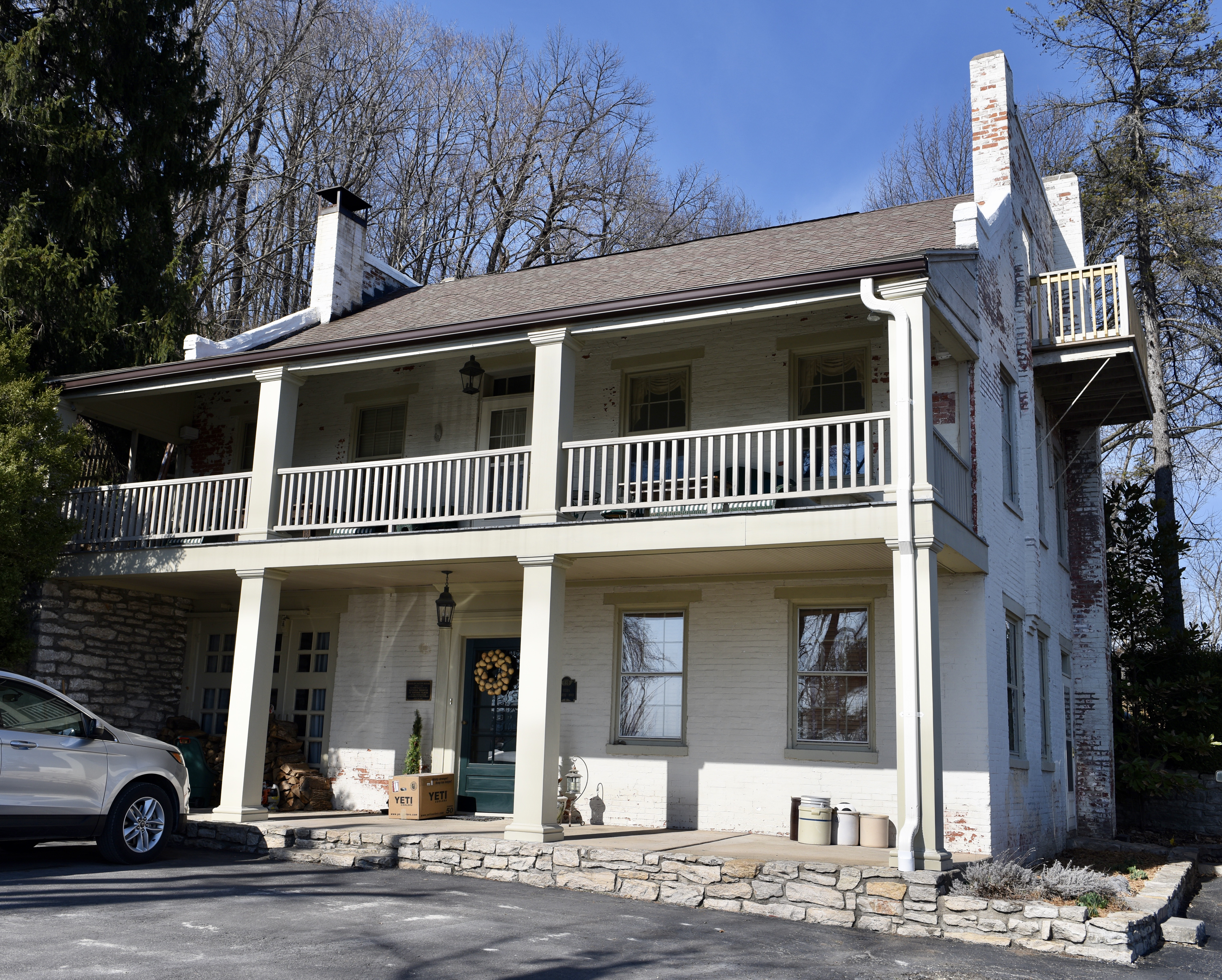

- Location within Missouri Location within the United States
- Location: 819 Kentucky St. Louisiana, Missouri
- Coordinates: 39°26′57″N 91°3′13″W
- Area: 1.6 acres (0.65 ha)
- Built: 1850
- Architectural style: Greek Revival, Vernacular Greek Revival
- NRHP reference No.: 90001104
- Added to NRHP: July 19, 1990

Charles Bacon House is a historic home located at Louisiana, Pike County, Missouri. It was built about 1850, and is a 2 1/2-story, five-bay, vernacular Greek Revival style brick dwelling. It sits on a stone foundation and features a two-story wood front porch.

It was listed on the National Register of Historic Places in 1990.
