= City Market (Louisiana, Missouri) =

- U.S. National Register of Historic Places
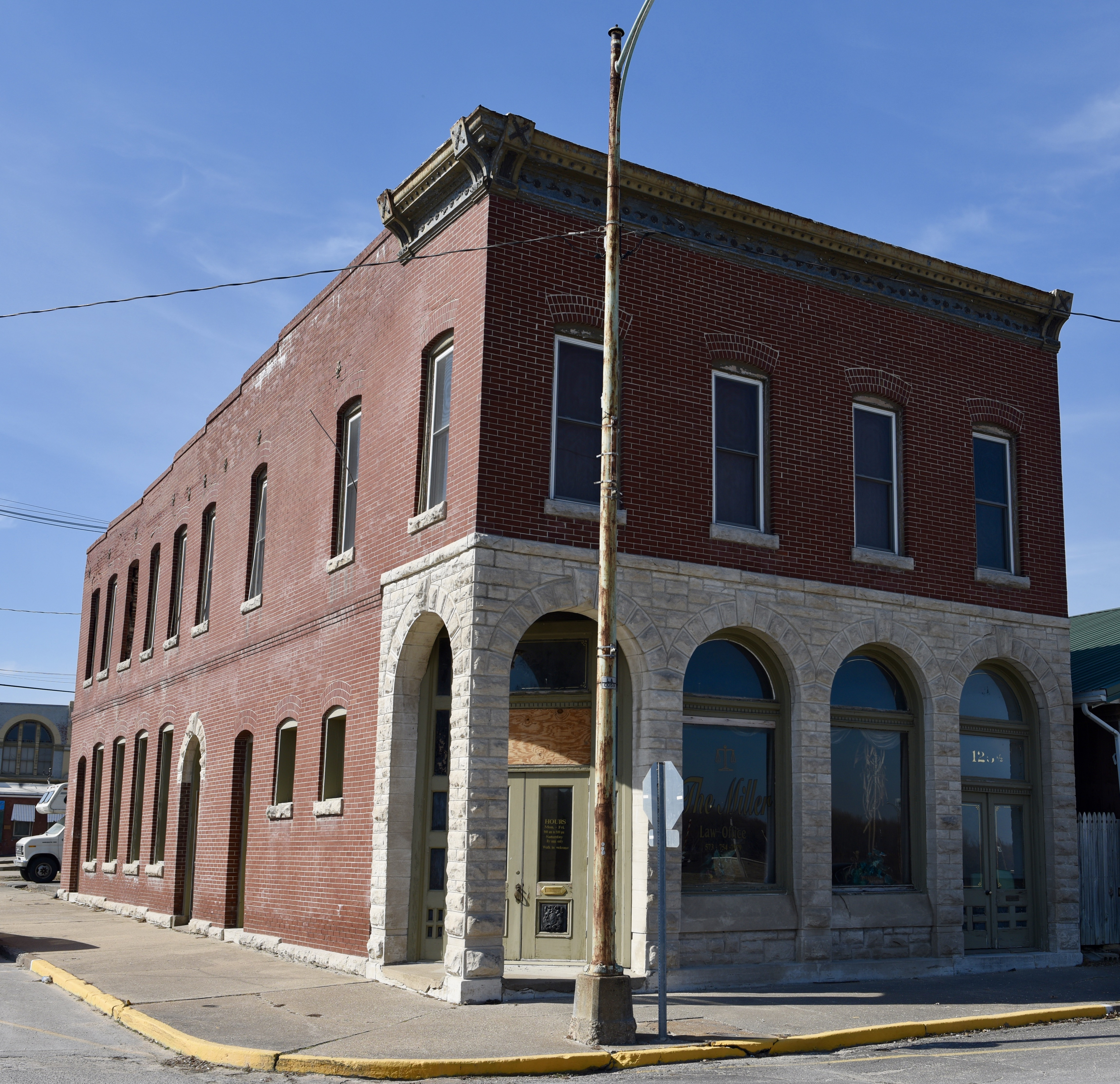

- Location within Missouri Location within the United States
- Location: 125 S. Main St. Louisiana, Missouri
- Coordinates: 39°27′6″N 91°2′46″W
- Area: less than one acre
- Built: 1885, c. 1900
- Built by: Kemry, J.W.
- Architectural style: Two-Part Commercial Block
- NRHP reference No.: 05000203
- Added to NRHP: March 23, 2005

City Market, also known as the W.H. Brown Grocery and Central Cash & Carry, is a historic commercial building located at Louisiana, Pike County, Missouri. The original section was built about 1885, with a Romanesque-inspired arcaded storefront of rough stone dating from about 1900. It is a two-story, rectangular, red brick building. It features a decorative metal cornice and segmental arched windows.

It was listed on the National Register of Historic Places in 2005.
