= Louisiana, Missouri =

City in Pike County, Missouri, United States

- City
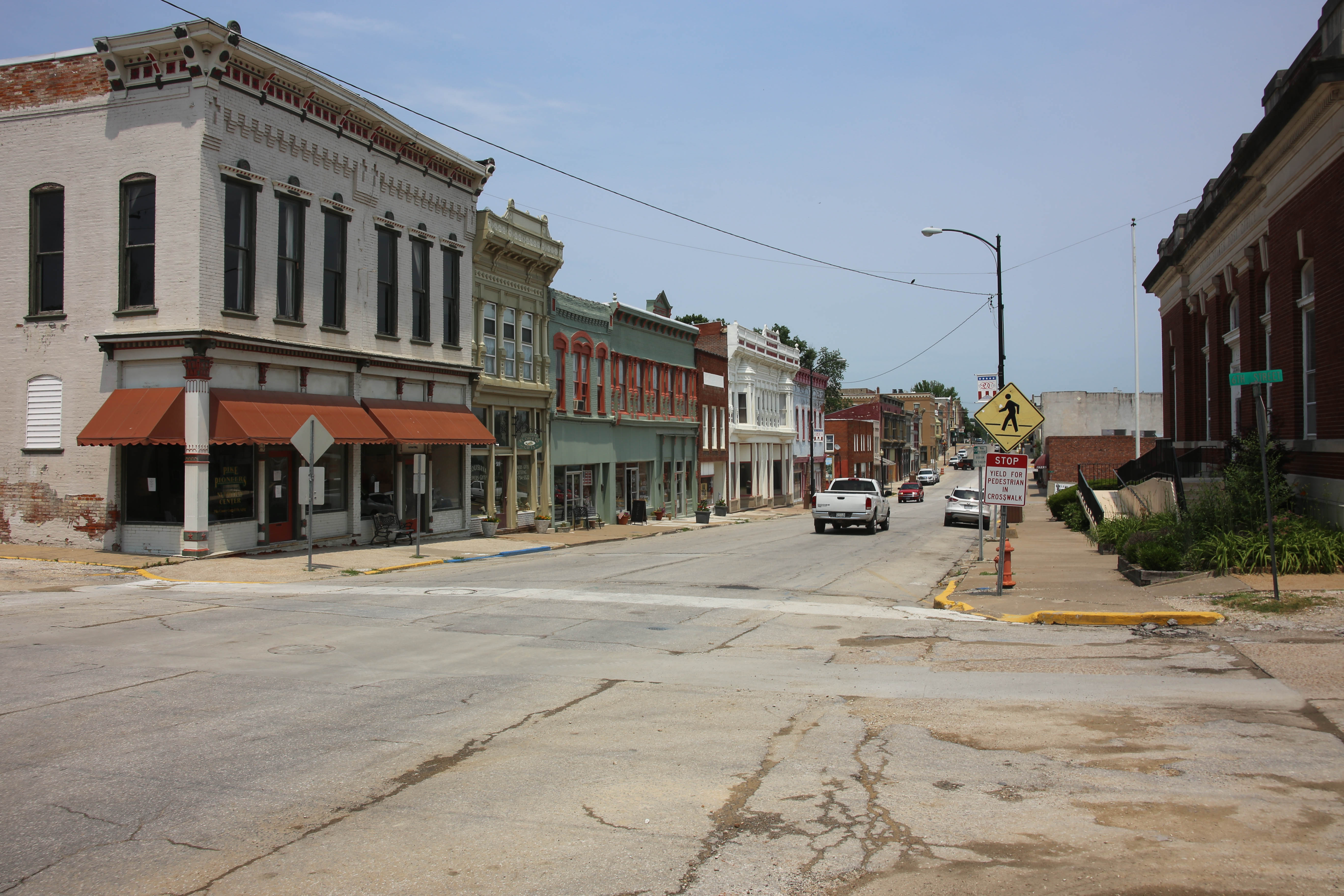
- Louisiana, Missouri in June 2018

- Location of Louisiana, Missouri
- Coordinates: 39°26′29″N 91°03′46″W
- Country: United States
- State: Missouri
- County: Pike

Area
  - Total: 3.42 sq mi (8.86 km^{2})
  - Land: 3.14 sq mi (8.12 km^{2})
  - Water: 0.29 sq mi (0.75 km^{2})
- Elevation: 492 ft (150 m)

Population (2020)
  - Total: 3,199
  - Density: 1,020.7/sq mi (394.11/km^{2})
- Time zone: UTC-6 (Central (CST))
  - Summer (DST): UTC-5 (CDT)
- ZIP code: 63353
- Area code: 573
- FIPS code: 29-44174
- GNIS feature ID: 2395770
- Website: louisianamo.gov

Louisiana is a city in Pike County, Missouri, United States. As of the 2020 census, Louisiana had a population of 3,199. Louisiana is located in northeast Missouri, on the Mississippi River, south of Hannibal.

== Description ==
Louisiana is located at the junction of State Route 79 and US 54. The former follows the Mississippi River for most of its length from Hannibal to St. Charles County. The latter enters Louisiana from Illinois via the Champ Clark Bridge, named for a former US Speaker of the House from nearby Bowling Green.

== History ==
The town was founded in 1816 by John Walter Basye and named after his daughter, Louisiana Basye. Other notable early residents were Samuel Caldwell and Joel Shaw, both of whom purchased land from Basye in 1818. All three properties became the original town plat and comprised mainly riverfront properties. Many of the town's residents trace their ancestry to these town pioneers. Louisiana proved to be a profitable shipping point on the Mississippi River, and that wealth led to numerous substantial antebellum homes. Many of those remain and, along with the Georgia Street Historic District in downtown Louisiana, are listed on the National Register of Historic Places. The Missouri Department of Natural Resources has noted that the town has "the most intact Victorian Streetscape in the state of Missouri."

Louisiana is one of three communities forming the 50 Miles of Art corridor, linked by history, heritage and Route 79; Louisiana, Clarksville and Hannibal are home to many artists, crafts persons and artisans. The community is also home to the annual Louisiana Country Colorfest.

In 1946, the town was the site of a Fischer-Tropsch plant capable of producing liquid hydrocarbon fuels. Seven scientists brought into the United States by Operation Paperclip from Nazi Germany took part in the research.

Louisiana hopes to be part of the "green energy" revolution as a former ammonia plant has been converted for the study and production of synthetic fuels. The city is also the headquarters of Lens.com.

Louisiana is home to Pike County's largest festival, the Louisiana Country Colorfest, which began in 1984. The event is held the third weekend in October and is attended by over 8,000 people annually.

In addition to the Georgia Street Historic District, the Charles Bacon House, Capt. George and Attella Barnard House, Bethel Chapel AME Church, City Market, Goodman-Stark House, Louisiana Chicago & Alton Railroad Depot, Louisiana Public Library, North Third Street Historic District, Pike County Hospital, and Gov. Lloyd Crow Stark House and Carriage House are listed on the National Register of Historic Places.

== Geography ==
The city is in northern Pike County on the Mississippi River. The city is served by U.S. Route 54 and Missouri Route 79. Bowling Green lies about ten miles to the southwest on route 54 and the town of Pike, Illinois lies across the river to the northeast. Clarksville is about nine miles to the southeast along route 79.

According to the United States Census Bureau, the city has a total area of 3.42 square miles (8.86 km^{2}), of which 3.13 square miles (8.11 km^{2}) is land and 0.29 square miles (0.75 km^{2}) is water.

== Demographics ==
Historical population
| Census | Pop. | Note | %± |
|---|---|---|---|
| 1850 | 912 | | — |
| 1860 | 2,436 | | 167.1% |
| 1870 | 3,639 | | 49.4% |
| 1880 | 4,325 | | 18.9% |
| 1890 | 5,090 | | 17.7% |
| 1900 | 5,131 | | 0.8% |
| 1910 | 4,454 | | −13.2% |
| 1920 | 4,060 | | −8.8% |
| 1930 | 3,549 | | −12.6% |
| 1940 | 4,669 | | 31.6% |
| 1950 | 4,389 | | −6.0% |
| 1960 | 4,286 | | −2.3% |
| 1970 | 4,533 | | 5.8% |
| 1980 | 4,261 | | −6.0% |
| 1990 | 3,967 | | −6.9% |
| 2000 | 3,863 | | −2.6% |
| 2010 | 3,364 | | −12.9% |
| 2020 | 3,199 | | −4.9% |
U.S. Decennial Census

=== 2020 census ===
As of the 2020 census, Louisiana had a population of 3,199. The median age was 39.5 years. 25.2% of residents were under the age of 18 and 20.3% were 65 years of age or older. For every 100 females, there were 91.2 males, and for every 100 females age 18 and over, there were 86.3 males age 18 and over.

0.0% of residents lived in urban areas, while 100.0% lived in rural areas.

There were 1,326 households, of which 31.6% had children under the age of 18 living in them. Of all households, 37.6% were married-couple households, 19.7% were households with a male householder and no spouse or partner present, and 32.8% were households with a female householder and no spouse or partner present. About 34.2% of all households were made up of individuals, and 16.9% had someone living alone who was 65 years of age or older.

There were 1,633 housing units, of which 18.8% were vacant. The homeowner vacancy rate was 2.8% and the rental vacancy rate was 8.8%.

Racial composition as of the 2020 census
| Race | Number | Percent |
|---|---|---|
| White | 2,689 | 84.1% |
| Black or African American | 183 | 5.7% |
| American Indian and Alaska Native | 20 | 0.6% |
| Asian | 7 | 0.2% |
| Native Hawaiian and Other Pacific Islander | 0 | 0.0% |
| Some other race | 72 | 2.3% |
| Two or more races | 228 | 7.1% |
| Hispanic or Latino (of any race) | 163 | 5.1% |

=== 2010 census ===
As of the census of 2010, there were 3,364 people, 1,411 households, and 880 families living in the city. The population density was 1,074.8 inhabitants per square mile (415.0/km^{2}). There were 1,732 housing units at an average density of 553.4 per square mile (213.7/km^{2}). The racial makeup of the city was 89.9% White, 4.7% African American, 0.2% Native American, 0.3% Asian, 2.3% from other races, and 2.6% from two or more races. Hispanic or Latino of any race were 4.1% of the population.

There were 1,411 households, of which 29.8% had children under the age of 18 living with them, 42.0% were married couples living together, 14.1% had a female householder with no husband present, 6.3% had a male householder with no wife present, and 37.6% were non-families. 32.2% of all households were made up of individuals, and 16.2% had someone living alone who was 65 years of age or older. The average household size was 2.35 and the average family size was 2.91.

The median age in the city was 41.3 years. 24.3% of residents were under the age of 18; 7.6% were between the ages of 18 and 24; 22.2% were from 25 to 44; 25.8% were from 45 to 64; and 20.1% were 65 years of age or older. The gender makeup of the city was 47.4% male and 52.6% female.

=== 2000 census ===
As of the census of 2000, there were 3,863 people, 1,590 households, and 1,006 families living in the city. The population density was 1,234.4 inhabitants per square mile (476.6/km^{2}). There were 1,843 housing units at an average density of 588.9 per square mile (227.4/km^{2}). The racial makeup of the city was 90.27% White, 5.72% African American, 0.36% Native American, 0.26% Asian, 0.13% Pacific Islander, 2.20% from other races, and 1.06% from two or more races. Hispanic or Latino of any race were 3.93% of the population.

There were 1,590 households, out of which 28.6% had children under the age of 18 living with them, 47.5% were married couples living together, 11.5% had a female householder with no husband present, and 36.7% were non-families. 32.6% of all households were made up of individuals, and 17.7% had someone living alone who was 65 years of age or older. The average household size was 2.35 and the average family size was 2.92.

In the city the population was spread out, with 24.4% under the age of 18, 7.6% from 18 to 24, 25.7% from 25 to 44, 20.8% from 45 to 64, and 21.5% who were 65 years of age or older. The median age was 40 years. For every 100 females, there were 89.2 males. For every 100 females age 18 and over, there were 86.0 males.

The median income for a household in the city was $30,467, and the median income for a family was $37,939. Males had a median income of $28,750 versus $19,167 for females. The per capita income for the city was $15,623. About 15.6% of families and 20.4% of the population were below the poverty line, including 30.7% of those under age 18 and 11.3% of those age 65 or over.

== Education ==
Public education in Louisiana is administered by Louisiana R-II School District.

Louisiana has a lending library, the Louisiana Public Library.

== Transportation ==
While there is no fixed-route transit service in Louisiana, intercity bus service is provided by Burlington Trailways in nearby Bowling Green.

== Notable people ==
- James E. Allen (1894–1964), artist, born in Louisiana
- W. W. Anderson (1845–?), attorney, lived in Louisiana
- Ratliff Boon (1781–1844), politician, died in Louisiana
- George Samuel Clason (1874–1957), author, wrote the book The Richest Man in Babylon, born in Louisiana
- Blanche Hinman Dow (1894–1873), academic administrator, born in Louisiana
- Horace Dyer (1873—1928), halfback and attorney, born in Louisiana
- Edwin Evers (born 1974), fisherman, born in Louisiana
- Claude Gillingwater (1870–1939), actor, born in Louisiana
- Emily Harrison (born 1977), actress, born in Louisiana
- Mary Foote Henderson (1842–1931), author and activist, lived in Louisiana
- Rowland L. Johnston (1872–1933), politician, born in Louisiana
- Hal Jones (born 1936), baseball player, born in Louisiana
- Lucy Foster Madison (1865–1932), educator, graduated from high school in Louisiana
- Tony Peck (born 1983), drummer, born in Louisiana
- William Schull (1922–2017), geneticist, born in Louisiana
- Eddie South (1904–1962), jazz violinist, born in Louisiana
- Lloyd C. Stark (1886–1982), 39th Governor of Missouri, born in Louisiana

== See also ==
- List of cities in Missouri
- Momo the Monster
- Synthetic Liquid Fuels Program
