= Goodman–Stark House =

Historic house in Missouri, United States

- U.S. National Register of Historic Places
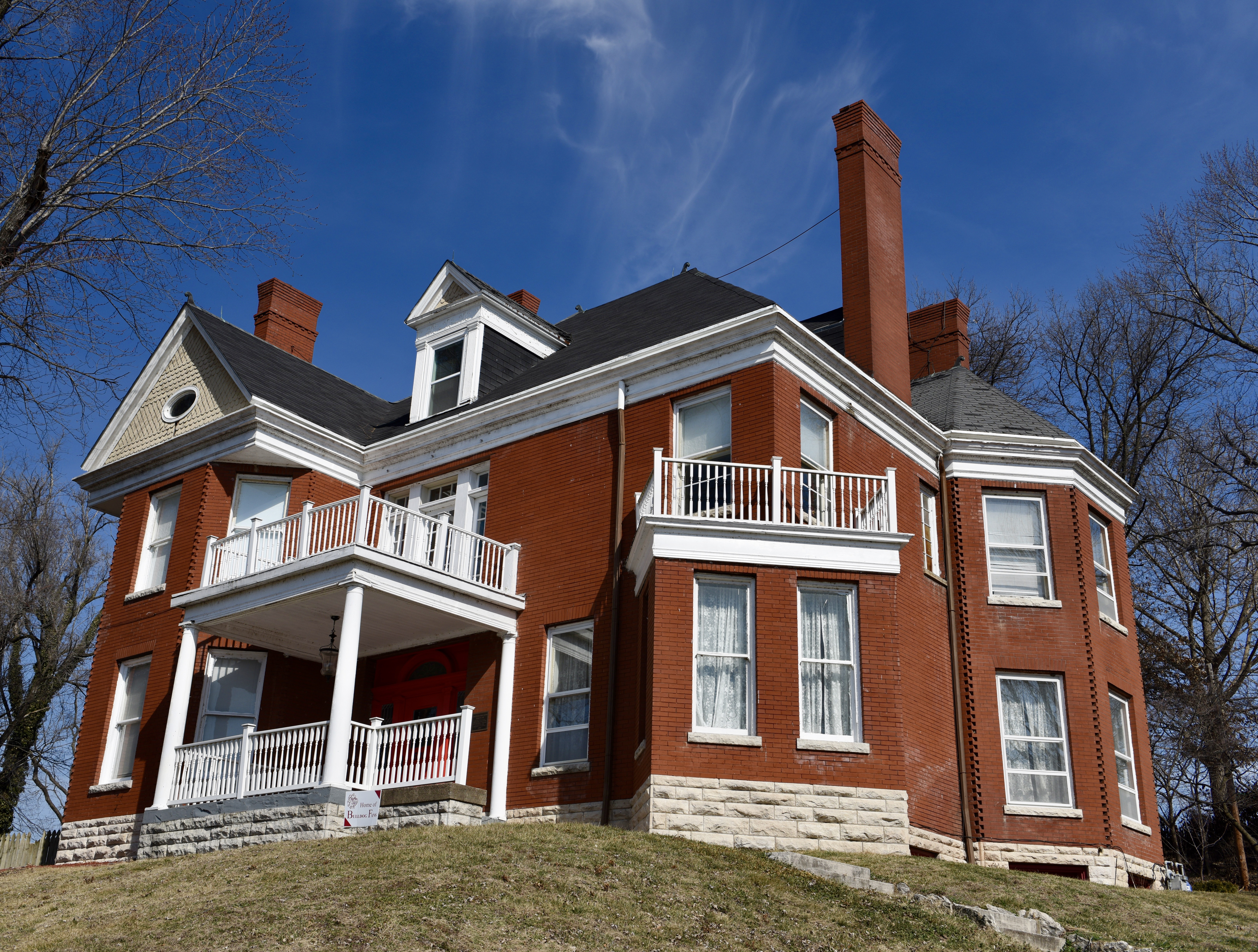

- Location within Missouri Location within the United States
- Location: 601 N. Third St. Louisiana, Missouri
- Coordinates: 39°27′14″N 91°3′0″W
- Area: less than one acre
- Built: 1894
- Architect: Franklin, J. J.; Wheeler, Lorenzo P.
- Architectural style: Queen Anne
- NRHP reference No.: 94001205
- Added to NRHP: October 22, 1994

Goodman–Stark House, also known as the Stark–Unsell House, is a historic home located at Louisiana, Pike County, Missouri. It was built about 1894, and is a 2 1/2-story, Queen Anne style brick dwelling. It has a steeply pitched hipped and gabled roof with intersecting ridges and a front-facing gable, prominent masonry chimneys and an asymmetrical facade with bay windows and balustraded porches.

It was listed on the National Register of Historic Places in 1994.
