= Old World Third Street Historic District =

Historic building in Milwaukee, Wisconsin, United States

- U.S. National Register of Historic Places
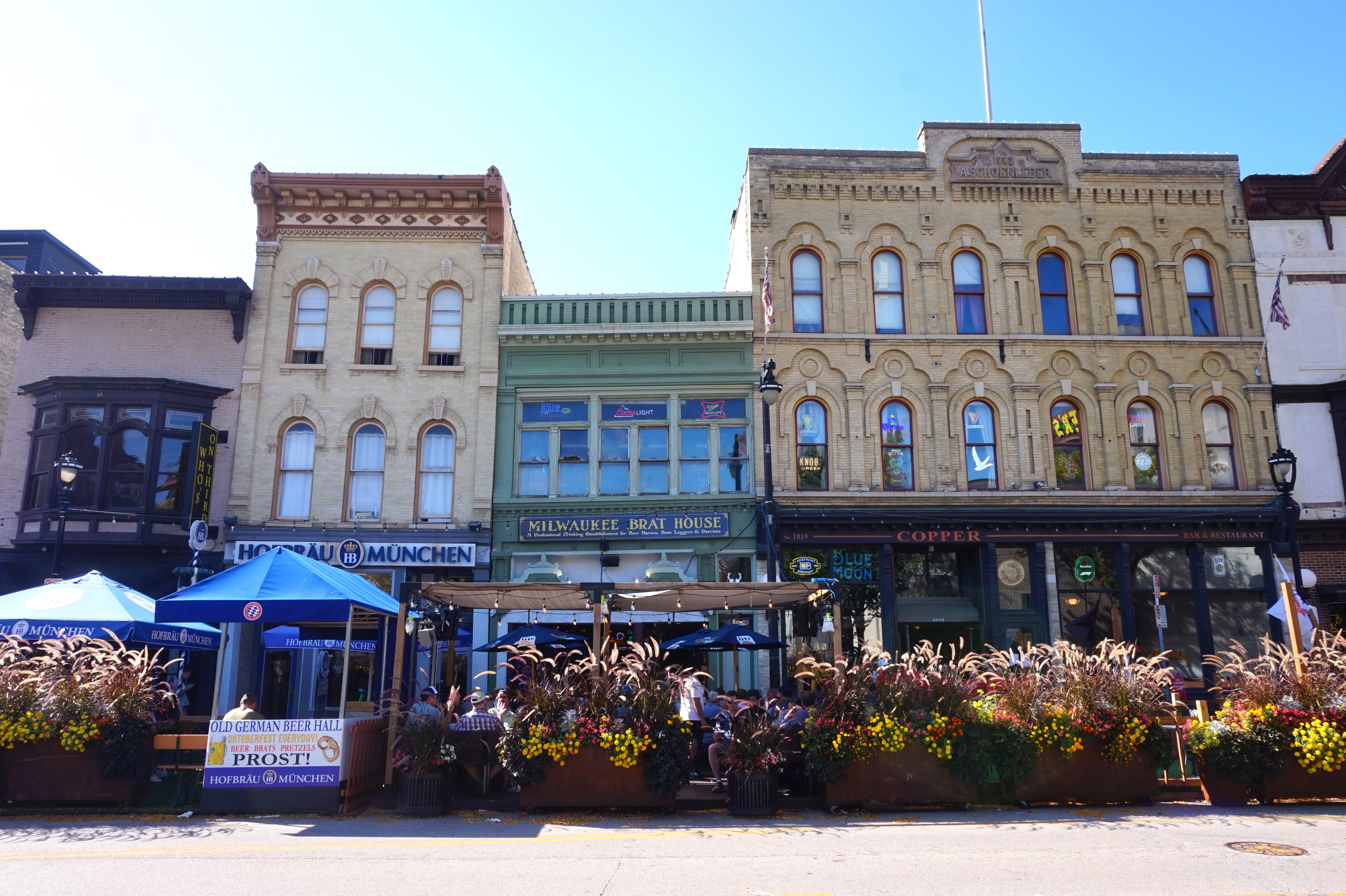
- A portion of the district.
- Location: N. Old World Third St., W. Highland Ave., and W. State St. Milwaukee, Wisconsin, U.S.
- NRHP reference No.: 87000494
- Added to NRHP: March 19, 1987

The Old World Third Street Historic District is the last relatively intact part of the original German retail district in Kilbourntown plat in Milwaukee, Wisconsin, United States. It contains examples of various styles of Victorian commercial architecture going back to 1855. It was listed on the National Register of Historic Places in 1987 and on the State Register of Historic Places in 1989.

A permanent European settlement in what would become Milwaukee began in 1822 when Solomon Juneau built a cabin so he could run his trading post year-round. In treaties of 1831 and 1833 Native Americans ceded this land to the U.S. government. In 1835 when the land was surveyed and ready to sell, Byron Kilbourn bought the land west of the Milwaukee River that this district occupies and platted his Kilbourntown. Juneau platted a competing town across the river on the east - Juneautown. A third competing settlement, Walker's Point, lay south across the Menomonee River. It wasn't until 1846 that the three competing settlements formed the united city.

Early settlers in the 1830s were mostly Yankees from New England, with some British, German, Irish, Norwegians, and Solomon Juneau's black cook, Joe Oliver. The first buildings were shanties and log cabins, then frame buildings: houses, stores, taverns, sawmills and shops. Two cream brick houses were built in 1836, and in 1840 a 3-story brick store at the corner of Third and Juneau which no longer exists. In 1840 a bridge was built to link Juneautown and Kilbourntown at Juneau Avenue. In that year the combined population of the three settlements was 1,692.

Kilbourntown's first cluster of businesses was at the corner West Juneau and Old World 3rd Street. Third Street led to the Green Bay Road and Juneau connected to the Madison Road, so businesses established along those arteries. While early Kilbourntown had been dominated by Yankees, in the late 1840s other groups began to pour in, and German immigrants soon dominated Kilbourntown. By 1858 the district was a mix of retail shops, wholesale houses, and light manufacturing. During the Civil War some of the early frame shops were replaced by three and four-story brick business blocks with stylish ornamentation in the brickwork.

By 1900 businesses lined Third Street from West Wisconsin to North Avenue. The streetcar network connected it to the larger west side business district on Wisconsin Avenue. Larger buildings like Steinmeyer Co. replaced smaller ones. But then in the 1900s the district was cut off from similar areas by massive office and industrial buildings like the Milwaukee Journal Building and the Park East Freeway. In the 1970s planners recognized that the remaining enclave of Victorian buildings had its own charm and began to promote its "old world," German character. Surviving buildings include:

- The Bauer building at 1029-31 N. Old World 3rd Street is a 3-story cream brick Italianate-styled store built around 1858, with carved lintels above the windows and a dentilated cornice.
- The Pritzlaff Hardware Co. building at 1033 N. Old World 3rd Street is a 4-story cream brick Italianate building with the first three stories built in 1861 and the fourth added about 1890. In contrast with the Bauer building next door, this one has round-topped windows decorated with a keystone ornament, and the top of the building sports a pressed metal cornice in Queen Anne style, which was in vogue by 1890. Like many buildings in the district, the street-level storefront has been remodeled, but the upper stories survive much as when they were originally built.
- The Otto Thiele Drug Store at 1009-11 North Old World 3rd Street is a 3-story cream brick store trimmed with limestone, designed in Italianate style by Henry C. Koch and built in 1874, topped with a pressed metal cornice, which is old but probably not original.
- The John Hinkel saloon at 1001 N. Old World 3rd Street is another 3-story Italianate-styled building clad in cream brick. Above the saloon downstairs was a meeting hall that Hinkel rented out.
- The John Lipps building at 1103 N. 3rd Street is a 3-story structure designed by Charles Gombert in Gothic Revival style and built in 1878. The 3rd Street side is clad in Amherst sandstone, in contrast to cream brick on the Highland Avenue side. Decorations include hood moulds over the windows, belt courses between the stories, an imposing cornice of sandstone and pressed metal, and above that a small parapet in the middle of each street-facing side. The store housed Espenhain & Bartels Dry Goods Co. from 1878 to 1896, then C.A. Rohde Stationery and Books.
- The Adolph Schoenleber building at 1015-19 N. Old World 3rd Street is a 3-story Italianate commercial block designed by Frederick Velguth and built in 1882. The upper windows are round-topped, forming an arcade with windows separated by pilasters and decorative arches in the brickwork above.
- The Joseph Schlitz Brewing Company Saloon at 322 W. State Street is a narrow 3-story structure designed by Charles Kirchhoff in Romanesque Revival style. Hallmarks of the style are the round arches and the rough stonework in the lower story to give it a sense of groundedness.
- The Steinmeyer building at 1054 N. Old World 3rd Street is another Romanesque Revival building, this one five stories and designed by Ferry & Clas. The north three bays were built in 1893 and the southern two were added in 1898. The building is clad in red pressed brick and trimmed with terra cotta. William Steinmeyer had it built as a grocery store and warehouse when his wholesale and retail grocery business was the largest in Milwaukee.
- The Usinger Sausage Factory at 1030 N 3rd Street is a 6-story brick Neoclassical-styled building designed by Jacob Hausmann & Brother and built in 1906. Fred Usinger was a German immigrant who started the business in 1880. Inside are murals of elves making sausage.
- Mader's Restaurant at 1037 N. Old World 3rd Street is a rambling Neo-German structure, with half-timbering, gable-end parapets from German Renaissance Revival style, and a cylindrical corner tower. It was remodeled to its current form in 1952 and 1962. Though too new to be a contributing property to the NRHP district, it contributes greatly to the historic German fabric of the neighborhood.
