= Capt. George and Attella Barnard House =

Historic house in Missouri, United States

- U.S. National Register of Historic Places
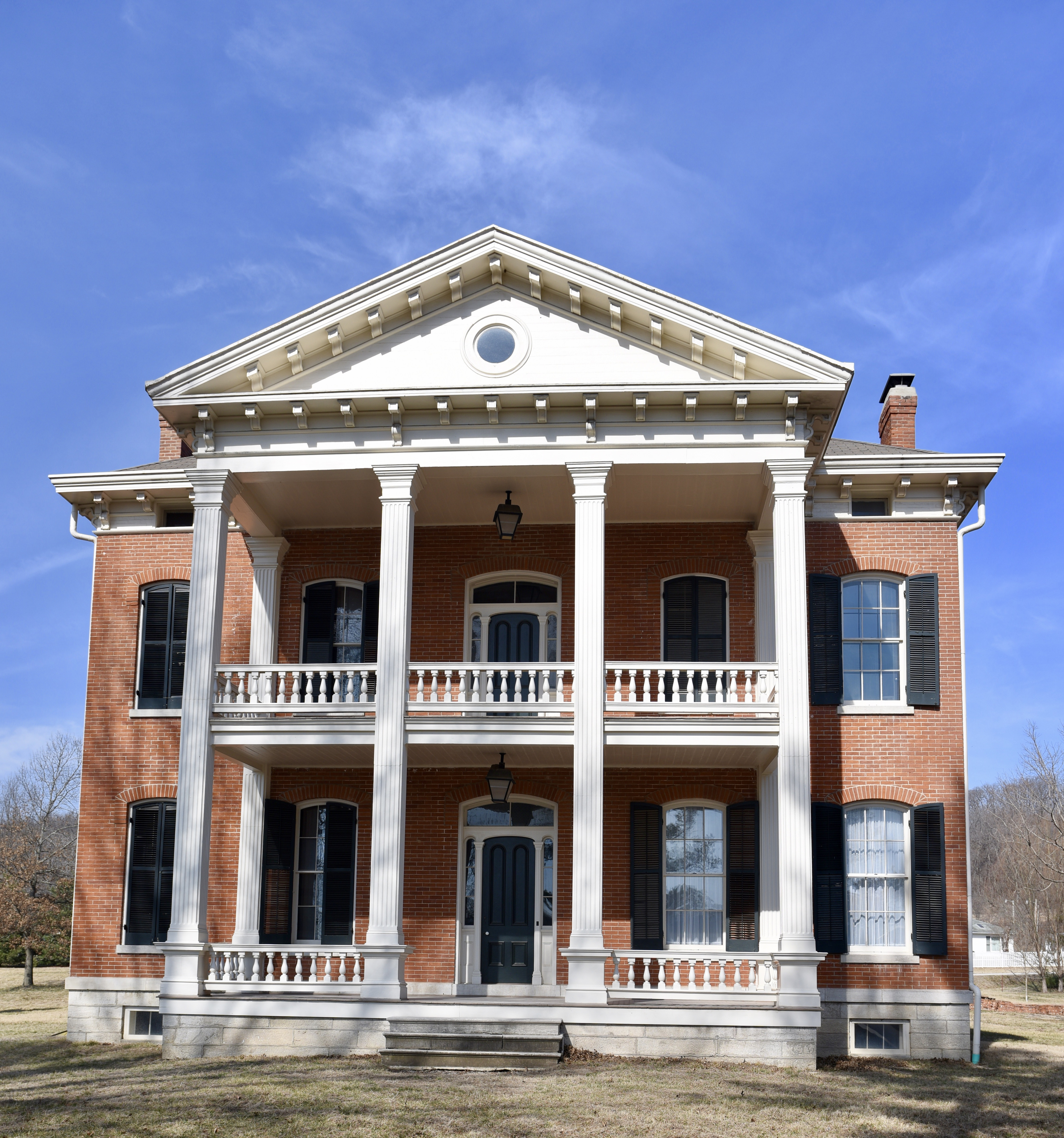

- Location within Missouri Location within the United States
- Location: 2009/2109 Georgia St., Louisiana, Missouri
- Coordinates: 39°26′32″N 91°3′53″W
- Area: 2 acres (0.81 ha)
- Built: 1869
- Architectural style: Mid-19th cent. transitional
- NRHP reference No.: 00000309
- Added to NRHP: March 31, 2000

Capt. George and Attella Barnard House, also known as the Atella Jane Keith House and Julius C. Jackson House, is a historic home located in Louisiana, Pike County, Missouri. It was built about 1869, and is a two-story, L-shaped, brick dwelling with a flat-topped hipped roof and limestone foundation. It exhibits Early Classical Revival, Greek Revival, Italianate style design elements. Its front facade is dominated by a two-story, classically detailed portico.

It was listed on the National Register of Historic Places in 1991.
