= Georgia Street Historic District =

Historic district in Missouri, United States

- U.S. National Register of Historic Places
- U.S. Historic district
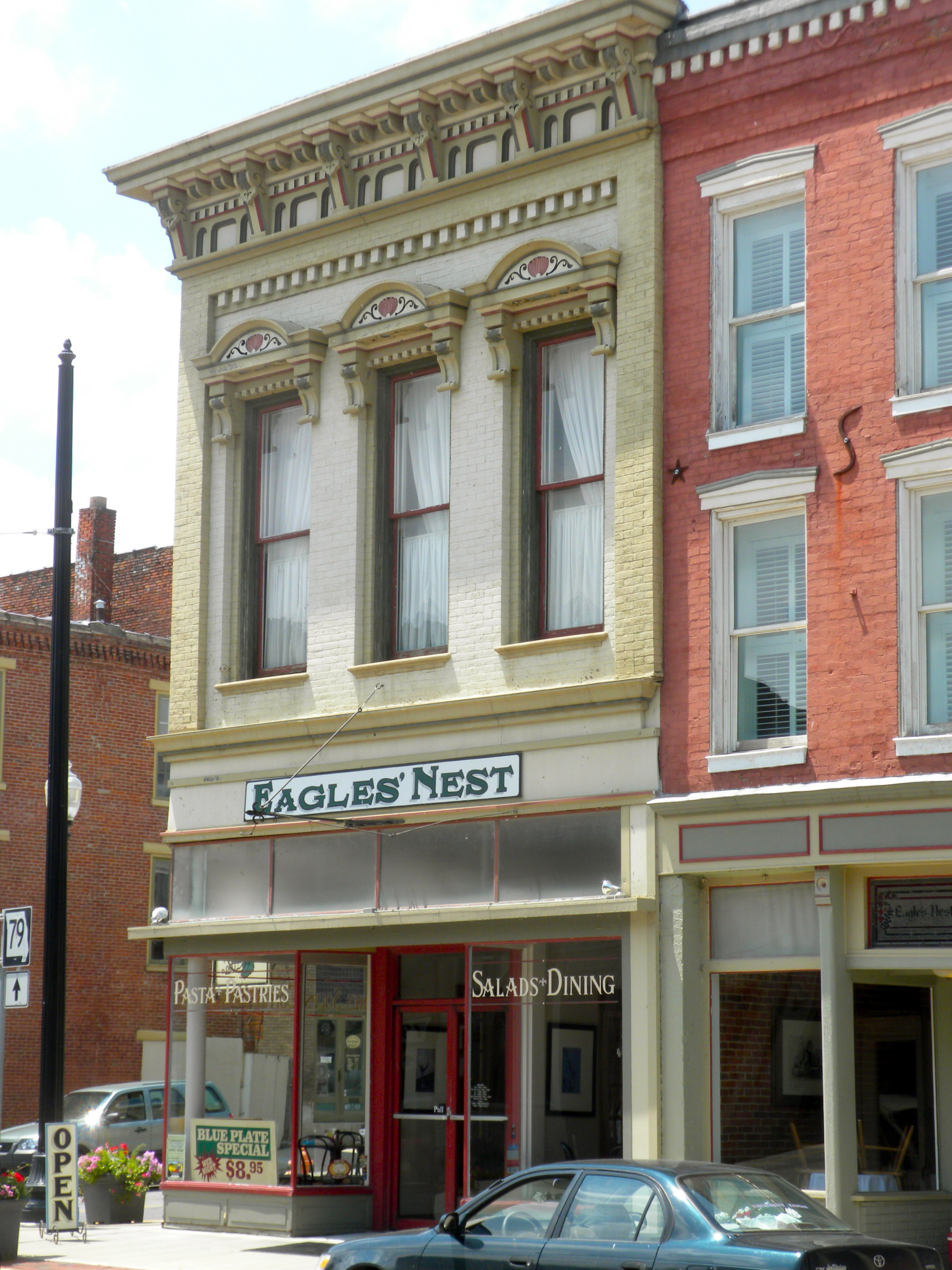
- Georgia Street Historic District, July 2010

- Location within Missouri Location within the United States
- Location: Roughly Georgia St. between Main and Seventh Sts., Louisiana, Missouri
- Coordinates: 39°26′57″N 91°02′56″W
- Area: 12 acres (4.9 ha)
- Architect: Multiple
- Architectural style: Late 19th And 20th Century Revivals, Greek Revival, Italianate
- NRHP reference No.: 87000653
- Added to NRHP: May 6, 1987

Georgia Street Historic District is a national historic district located at Louisiana, Pike County, Missouri. The district encompasses 55 contributing buildings in the central business district of Louisiana. It developed between about 1845 and 1935, and includes representative examples of Greek Revival, Italianate, and Classical Revival style architecture. Notable buildings include the Masonic Temple (1910), Odd Fellows lodge (1890), and Post Office (1905).

It was listed on the National Register of Historic Places in 1987.
