= Beaver Dams, New York =

- Hamlet
- Location within New York Location within the United States
- Coordinates: 42°17′28″N 76°57′35″W
- Country: United States
- State: New York
- County: Schuyler
- Elevation: 1,263 ft (385 m)
- Time zone: UTC-5 (Eastern (EST))
  - Summer (DST): UTC-4 (EDT)
- ZIP code: 14812
- Area code: 607
- GNIS feature ID: 943382

Beaver Dams is a hamlet in the town of Dix in Schuyler County, New York, United States. The community is located along New York State Route 414, 7.6 miles (12.2 km) southwest of Watkins Glen. Beaver Dams has a post office with ZIP code 14812, which opened on August 12, 1833, and a Methodist church on Route 19.
