= The Richest Man in Babylon =

1926 personal finance book by George S. Calson

- Table of contents, 1926 edition
- Author: George S. Clason
- Language: English
- Subject: Wealth management, Self-help
- Genre: Non-fiction
- Publisher: Penguin Books
- Publication date: 1926 (first edition)
- Publication place: United States
- Media type: Print (hardback and paperback)
- Pages: 144
- ISBN: 978-0451205360

The Richest Man in Babylon is a 1926 book by George S. Clason that dispenses financial advice through a collection of parables set 4,097 years earlier, in ancient Babylon. The book remains in print a century after the parables were originally published, and is regarded as a classic of personal financial advice.

== Background ==
The parables are told by a fictional Babylonian character called Arkad, a poor scribe who became the "richest man in Babylon". Included in Arkad's advice are the "Seven Cures" (or how to generate money and wealth), and the "Five Laws of Gold" (or how to protect and invest wealth). A core part of Arkad's advice is around "paying yourself first", "living within your means", "investing in what you know", the importance of "long-term saving", and "home ownership".

The content is from a series of pamphlets distributed by U.S. banks and insurance companies in 1920–24; the pamphlets were bound together and published as a book in 1926. The book is often referred to as a classic of personal financial advice, and appears in modern recommended reading lists on personal financial advice and wealth management, which has kept the book in print almost 90 years after its first edition with over 2 million copies sold.

Clason himself published an illustrated hardback edition in 1930 titled The Richest Man in Babylon and Other Stories which now sells for USD 1,250.

The unusual structure of the book has inspired many modern derivative works providing further discussion and insights on the parables.

== Structure ==
The original 1926 book groups the parables into general themes of advice, and particularly "The Seven Cures" and the "Five Laws of Gold".

Some themes can overlap (e.g. The First Cure is similar to the First Law of Gold).

=== Seven Cures For a Lean Purse ===
1. The First Cure: Start thy purse to fattening.
  Arkad advises on saving 10% of your annual income to start building up your wealth (or purse): "For every ten coins thou placest within thy purse take out for use but nine. Thy purse will start to fatten at once and its increasing weight will feel good in thy hand and bring satisfaction to thy soul".
2. The Second Cure: Control thy expenditures.
  Arkad advises against luxury expenditures that ultimately become confused as necessities: "The gold we may retain from our earnings is but the start", and, "What each of us calls our 'necessary expenses' will always grow to equal our incomes unless we protest to the contrary", and, "Confuse not the necessary expenses with thy desires".
3. The Third Cure: Make thy gold multiply.
  Arkad advises to invest and to compound the investment return from these savings: "The earnings it will make shall build our fortunes ... Learn to make your treasure work for you. Make it your slave. Make its children and its children's children work for you".
4. The Fourth Cure: Guard thy treasures from loss.
  Arkad advises against taking a risk of loss and investing get-rich-quick schemes: "Is it wise to be intrigued by larger earnings when thy principal may be lost? I say not. The penalty of risk is probable loss. Study carefully, before parting with thy treasure, each assurance that it may be safely reclaimed. Be not misled by thine own romantic desires to make wealth rapidly".
5. The Fifth Cure: Make of thy dwelling a profitable investment.
  Arkad advises buying versus renting your principal residence, and to use your residence to establish a business: "I recommend that every man own the roof that sheltereth him and his", and, "Nor is it beyond the ability of any well-intentioned man to own his home".
6. The Sixth Cure: Ensure a future income.
  Arkad advises on having a pension and future retirement income: "Therefore do I say that it behooves a man to make preparations for a suitable income in the days to come, when he is no longer young, and to make preparations for his family should he be no longer with them to comfort and support them".
7. The Seventh Cure: Increase thy ability to earn.
  Arkad advises to keep developing your own skills to increase your investing wisdom and also to increase your earnings power: "The more of wisdom we know, the more we may earn", and, "That man who seeks to learn more of his craft shall be richly rewarded".

=== The Five Laws of Gold ===
1. The First Law of Gold. Gold cometh gladly and in increasing quantity to any man who will put by not less than one-tenth of his earnings to create an estate for his future and that of his family.
  Arkad's advice here is very similar to the First Cure, which is that saving is the start towards building wealth.
2. The Second Law of Gold. Gold laboreth diligently and contentedly for the wise owner who finds for it profitable employment, multiplying even as the flocks of the field.
  Arkad's advice here is very similar to the Third Cure, which is that these savings can themselves grow and compound your wealth.
3. The Third Law of Gold. Gold clingeth to the protection of the cautious owner who invests it under the advice of men wise in its handling.
  Arkad's advice here is similar to the Fourth Cure, which is about being patient and having a long-term view.
4. The Fourth Law of Gold. Gold slippeth away from the man who invests it in businesses or purposes with which he is not familiar or which are not approved by those skilled in its keep.
  Arkad's advice here is about investing in what you know about and understand. Also, not to invest in schemes which seasoned investors would not recommend (e.g. buying based on "stock tips").
5. The Fifth Law of Gold. Gold flees the man who would force it to impossible earnings or who followeth the alluring advice of tricksters and schemers or who trusts it to his own inexperience and romantic desires in investment.
  Arkad's advice here is about avoiding get-rich-quick or very aggressive wealth creation strategies.

=== Other parables ===
The final chapters of the 1926 book cover individual parables:

- The Gold Lender of Babylon. Better a little caution than a great regret.
- The Walls of Babylon. We cannot afford to be without adequate protection.
- The Camel Trader of Babylon. Where the determination is, a way can be found.

There is then an unusual section where a contemporary archeologist reveals five clay Babylonian tablets (numbered I to V), whose inscriptions provide short parables.

The final chapter in the 1926 book is on The Luckiest Man in Babylon.

== See also ==
- The Intelligent Investor
- Think and Grow Rich
- Poor Charlie's Almanack
