= William R. Griffith House =

Historic house in Pennsylvania, United States

- U.S. National Register of Historic Places
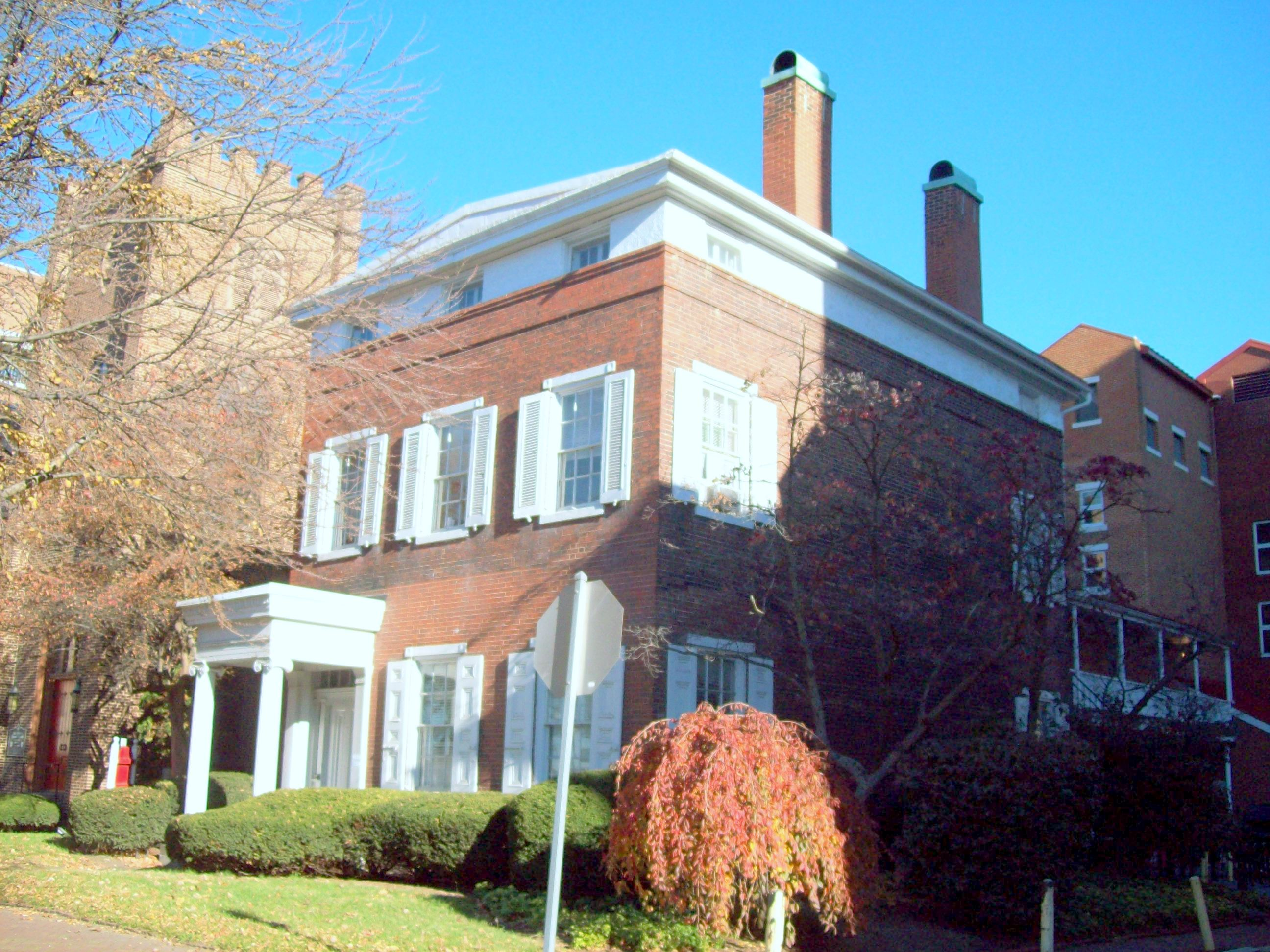
- William R. Griffith House, November 2010

- Location within Pennsylvania Location within the United States
- Location: 215 N. Front St., Harrisburg, Pennsylvania
- Coordinates: 40°15′38″N 76°53′9″W
- Area: 0.3 acres (0.12 ha)
- Built: 1840-1843
- Architect: Hills, Stephen
- Architectural style: Greek Revival
- NRHP reference No.: 76001631
- Added to NRHP: October 21, 1976

The William R. Griffith House, also known as the Cathedral House or the Cathedral House of St. Stephen's Episcopal Cathedral, is an historic home that is located in Harrisburg, Dauphin County, Pennsylvania, United States.

It was added to the National Register of Historic Places in 1976.

== History and architectural features ==
Built between 1840 and 1843, this historic structure is a three-story, three-bay-wide, brick dwelling that was designed in the Greek Revival style. The front block measures twenty-eight feet by forty feet, with a narrower rear block measuring fifteen feet by fifty feet. It features a front portico with freestanding Ionic order columns.
