= St. John's Episcopal Church (Eolia, Missouri) =

Historic church in Missouri, United States

- U.S. National Register of Historic Places
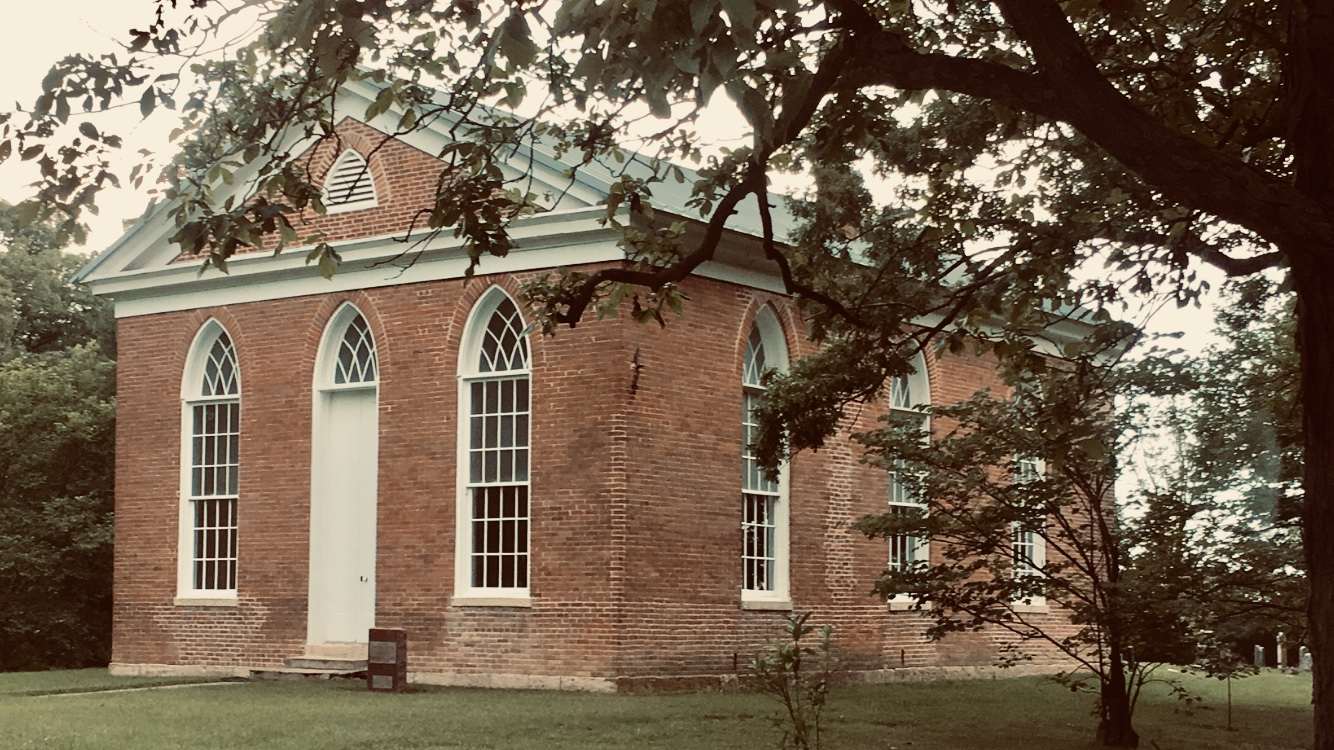

- Location within Missouri Location within the United States
- Location: 0.25 miles N of Eolia on CR D, 0.25 miles E on CR H, near Eolia, Missouri
- Coordinates: 39°14′58″N 91°0′29″W
- Area: 5 acres (2.0 ha)
- Built: c. 1856
- Architectural style: Greek Revival, Gothic Revival
- NRHP reference No.: 70000346
- Added to NRHP: July 8, 1970

St. John's Episcopal Church, also known as Old St. John's, is a historic Episcopal church building located near Eolia, Pike County, Missouri, United States. It was built about 1856, and is a one-story, rectangular, brick church in a transitional Greek Revival / Gothic Revival style. It rests on a limestone block foundation and simple ridge roof.

It was listed on the National Register of Historic Places in 1970.
