= Bethel Chapel AME Church =

Historic church in Missouri, United States

- U.S. National Register of Historic Places
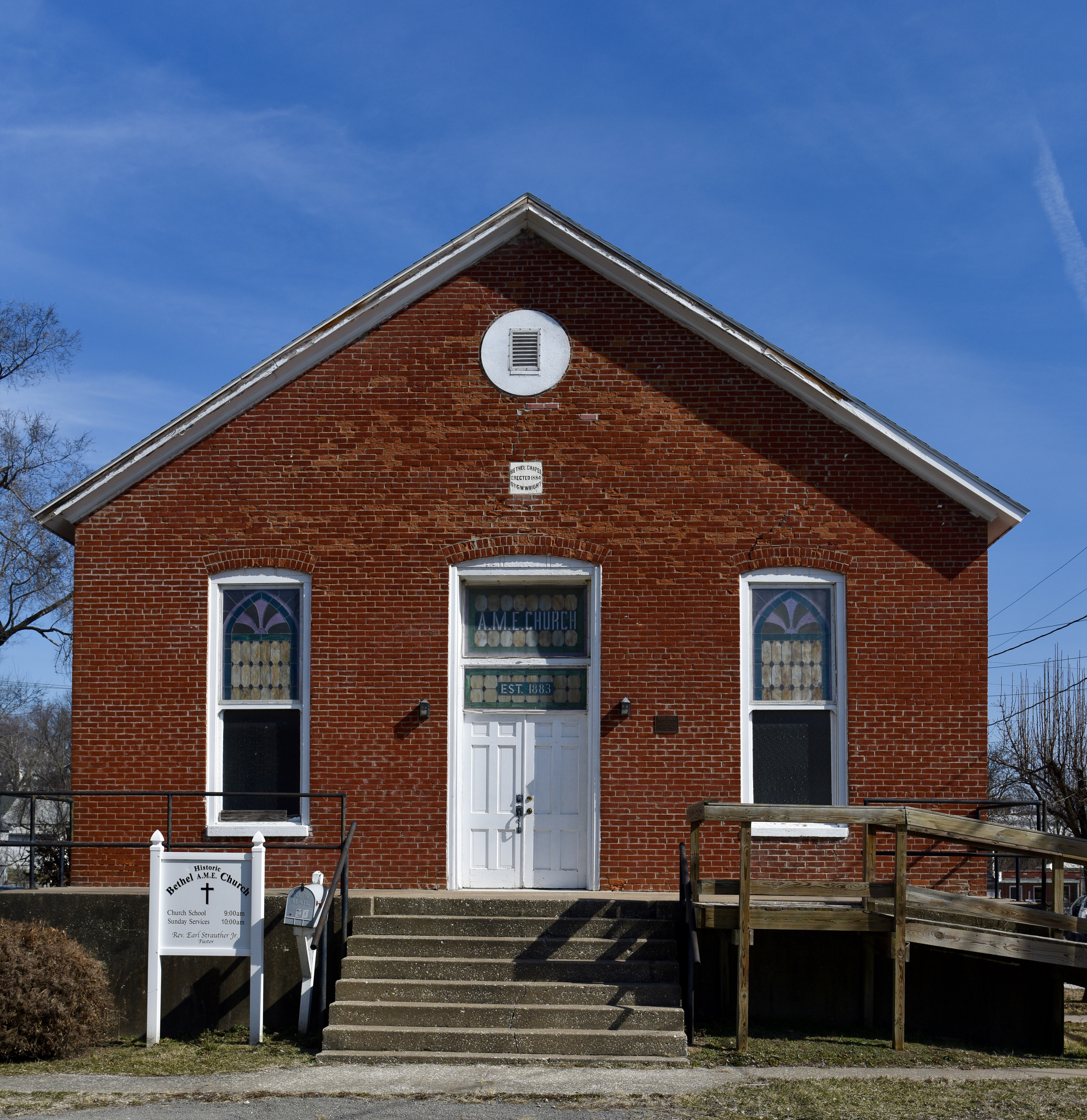

- Location within Missouri Location within the United States
- Location: Jct. of 6th and Tennessee Sts., Louisiana, Missouri
- Coordinates: 39°26′58″N 91°3′2″W
- Area: less than one acre
- Built: 1884
- Built by: Wright, G.W.
- NRHP reference No.: 95000926
- Added to NRHP: July 28, 1995

Bethel Chapel AME Church is a historic African Methodist Episcopal church located at the junction of 6th and Tennessee Streets in Louisiana, Pike County, Missouri. It was built in 1884, and is a one-story, rectangular, gable roof brick church. It measures 60 feet by 37 feet and sits on a cut limestone foundation.

It was listed on the National Register of Historic Places in 1995.
