= Pike County Hospital =

Hospital in Missouri, U.S.

- U.S. National Register of Historic Places
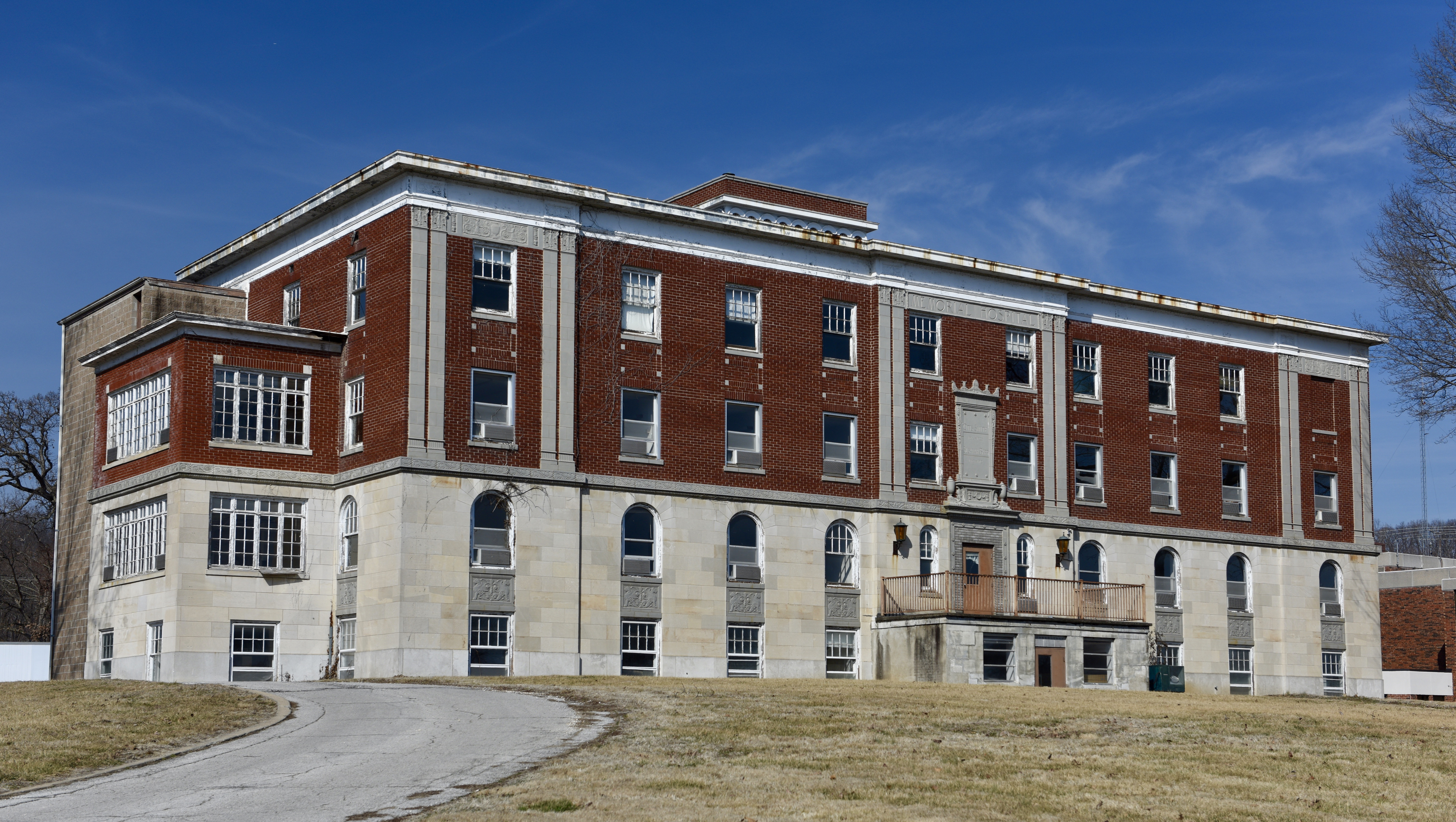

- Location within Missouri Location within the United States
- Location: 2407 West Georgia St. Louisiana, Missouri
- Coordinates: 39°26′26″N 91°03′52″W
- Area: 4.2 acres (1.7 ha)
- Built: 1927-1928
- Architect: Barnett, George D.
- Architectural style: Classical Revival
- NRHP reference No.: 06000862
- Added to NRHP: September 19, 2006

Pike County Hospital, also known as the Smith-Barr Manor, is a historic hospital building located at Louisiana, Pike County, Missouri. It was built in 1927–1928, and is a four-story, rectangular, Classical Revival style red brick and stone building. It has a flat roof with a two-story square red brick penthouse. It features a main entrance with decorative stone surround and cartouche, and additional terra cotta and stone ornamentation. It was converted to a nursing home in 1975.

It was listed on the National Register of Historic Places in 2006.
