= Paynesville, Missouri =

Paynesville
- Village
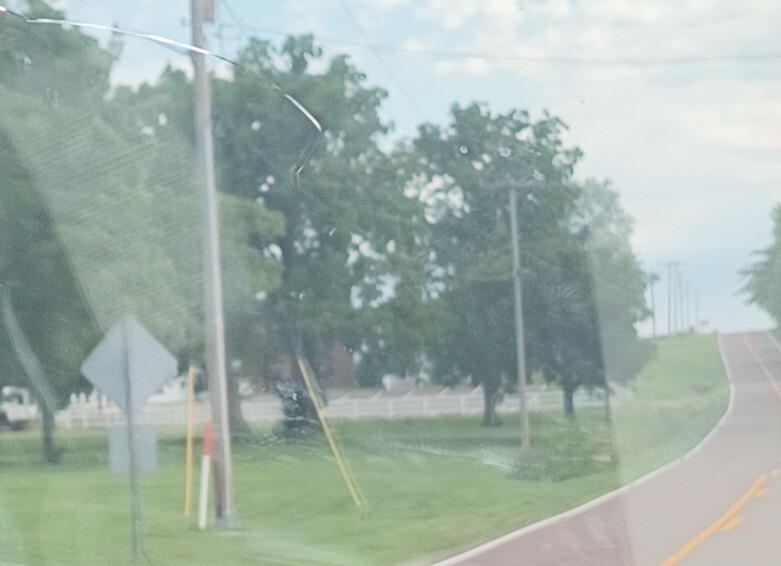
- Paynesville in 2026

- Location of Paynesville, Missouri
- Coordinates: 39°15′45″N 90°54′01″W
- Country: United States
- State: Missouri
- County: Pike

Government
  - Mayor: Joanne Hammuck

Area
  - Total: 0.26 sq mi (0.68 km^{2})
  - Land: 0.26 sq mi (0.68 km^{2})
  - Water: 0 sq mi (0.00 km^{2})
- Elevation: 535 ft (163 m)

Population (2020)
  - Total: 60
  - Density: 228.0/sq mi (88.02/km^{2})
- Time zone: UTC-6 (Central (CST))
  - Summer (DST): UTC-5 (CDT)
- ZIP code: 63336
- Area code: 573
- FIPS code: 29-56612
- GNIS feature ID: 2399638

Paynesville is a village in Pike County, Missouri, United States. As of the 2020 census, Paynesville had a population of 60.

== History ==
Paynesville was platted in 1831, and named after William Payne, a St. Louis-based tradesman. A post office called Paynesville was established in 1833, and remained in operation until 1997.

The Meloan, Cummins & Co., General Store was listed on the National Register of Historic Places in 1993.

== Geography ==
According to the United States Census Bureau, the village has a total area of 0.26 square miles (0.67 km^{2}), all land.

== Demographics ==
Historical population
Census	Pop.	Note	%±
1880	243		—
1970	90		—
1980	85		−5.6%
1990	54		−36.5%
2000	91		68.5%
2010	77		−15.4%
2020	60		−22.1%
U.S. Decennial Census

=== 2010 census ===
As of the census of 2010, there were 77 people, 34 households, and 19 families living in the village. The population density was 296.2 inhabitants per square mile (114.4/km^{2}). There were 38 housing units at an average density of 146.2 per square mile (56.4/km^{2}). The racial makeup of the village was 83.1% White, 14.3% African American, and 2.6% from two or more races.

There were 34 households, of which 26.5% had children under the age of 18 living with them, 35.3% were married couples living together, 14.7% had a female householder with no husband present, 5.9% had a male householder with no wife present, and 44.1% were non-families. 44.1% of all households were made up of individuals, and 20.5% had someone living alone who was 65 years of age or older. The average household size was 2.26 and the average family size was 3.16.

The median age in the village was 38.1 years. 26% of residents were under the age of 18; 3.9% were between the ages of 18 and 24; 26% were from 25 to 44; 24.7% were from 45 to 64; and 19.5% were 65 years of age or older. The gender makeup of the village was 54.5% male and 45.5% female.

=== 2000 census ===
As of the census of 2000, there were 91 people, 33 households, and 25 families living in the village. The population density was 345.7 inhabitants per square mile (133.5/km^{2}). There were 35 housing units at an average density of 133.0 per square mile (51.4/km^{2}). The racial makeup of the village was 73.63% White and 26.37% African American.

There were 33 households, out of which 36.4% had children under the age of 18 living with them, 48.5% were married couples living together, 15.2% had a female householder with no husband present, and 24.2% were non-families. 24.2% of all households were made up of individuals, and 15.2% had someone living alone who was 65 years of age or older. The average household size was 2.76 and the average family size was 3.20.

In the village, the population was spread out, with 26.4% under the age of 18, 8.8% from 18 to 24, 28.6% from 25 to 44, 20.9% from 45 to 64, and 15.4% who were 65 years of age or older. The median age was 37 years. For every 100 females, there were 116.7 males. For every 100 females age 18 and over, there were 103.0 males.

The median income for a household in the village was $25,625, and the median income for a family was $30,000. Males had a median income of $21,875 versus $18,125 for females. The per capita income for the village was $11,783. There were 9.1% of families and 14.3% of the population living below the poverty line, including 41.2% of those under 18 and 20.0% of those over 64.

== Notable people ==
- Paul Meloan (1888–1950), baseball player
