= Summit, Alabama =

Unincorporated community in Alabama, United States

- Unincorporated community
- Location within Alabama Location within the United States
- Coordinates: 34°12′16″N 86°29′39″W
- Country: United States
- State: Alabama
- County: Blount
- Elevation: 915 ft (279 m)
- Time zone: UTC-6 (Central (CST))
  - Summer (DST): UTC-5 (CDT)
- Area codes: 205, 659
- GNIS feature ID: 127547

Summit is an unincorporated community in Blount County, Alabama, United States. Summit is located along County Route 48 (CR-48) near US-231/SR-53, 10.1 miles (16.3 km) northeast of Blountsville.

Alabama is home to a wealth of caves; northeast Alabama is considered a cave "hotspot" in the United States because of its many caves and the number of animals inhabiting those environments. This area contains approximately two-thirds of the state's caves, but numerous other parts of the state possess the geology necessary for cave formation—beds of carbonate rock.

Summit, along with its many caves, is the setting of O. Henry's short-story "The Ransom of Red Chief"
