= Louisiana Public Library =

- U.S. National Register of Historic Places
- U.S. Historic district – Contributing property
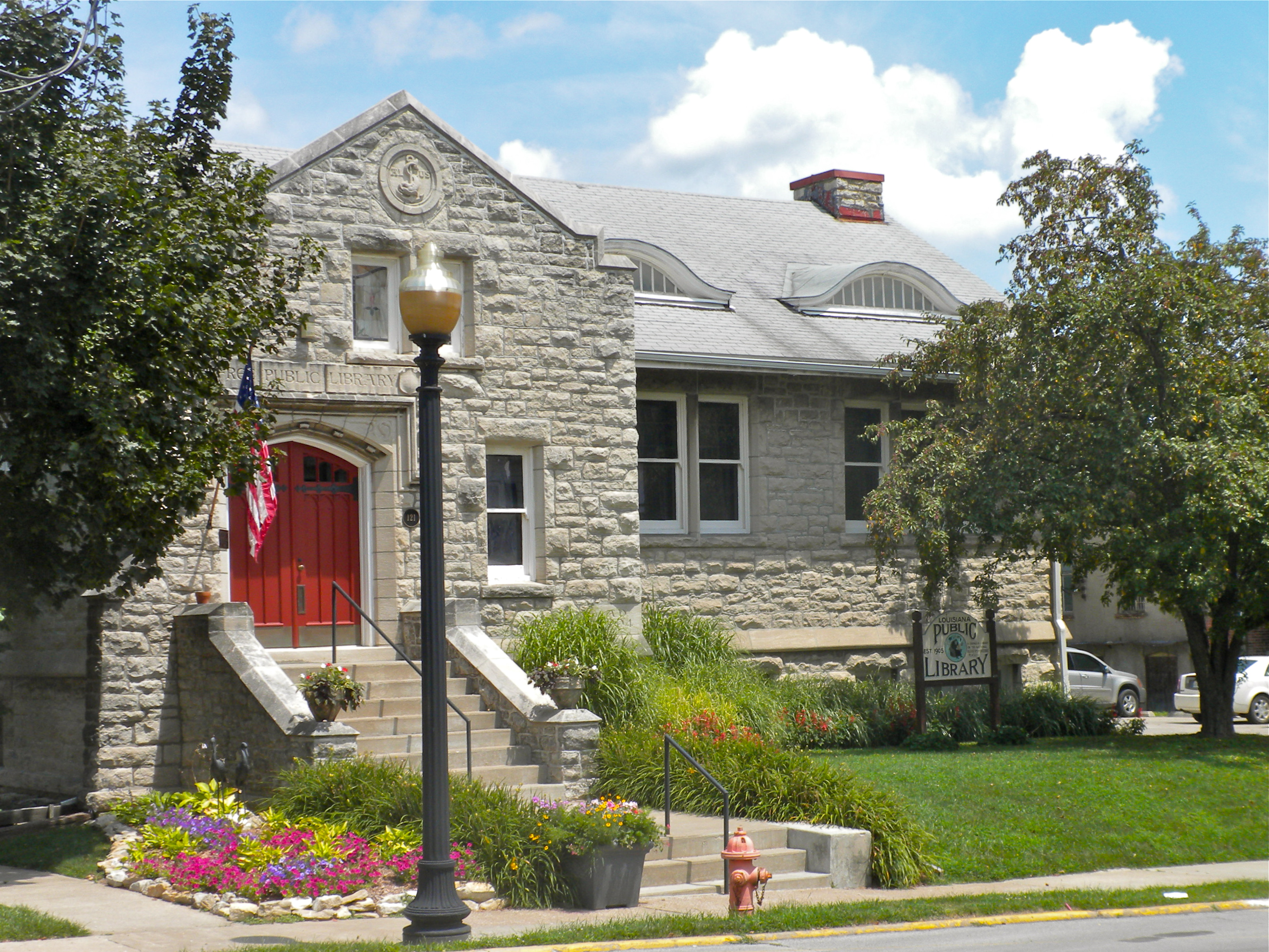
- Louisiana Public Library, July 2010

- Location within Missouri Location within the United States
- Location: 121 N. 3rd St., Louisiana, Missouri
- Coordinates: 39°27′2″N 91°2′51″W
- Area: less than one acre
- Built: 1905
- Built by: Edward Ward
- Architect: Mauran, Russell & Garden
- Architectural style: Late Gothic Revival
- NRHP reference No.: 96000401
- Added to NRHP: April 12, 1996

Louisiana Public Library is a historic Carnegie library building located at Louisiana, Pike County, Missouri. It was designed by the architectural firm Mauran, Russell & Garden and built in 1905. It is a one-story, Late Gothic Revival style rock-faced, cut limestone building on a partially exposed basement. It measures approximately 50 feet by 40 feet and features a front arched doorway with batten doors, eyebrow windows, and stepped parapet. It was constructed with a $10,000 grant from the Carnegie Foundation.

It was listed on the National Register of Historic Places in 1996. It is located in the North Third Street Historic District.
