= Eolia, Missouri =

- Village
- Eolia in 2026

- Location of Eolia, Missouri
- Coordinates: 39°14′20″N 91°00′43″W
- Country: United States
- State: Missouri
- County: Pike
- Incorporated: 1964

Area
  - Total: 1.23 sq mi (3.18 km^{2})
  - Land: 1.22 sq mi (3.16 km^{2})
  - Water: 0.0077 sq mi (0.02 km^{2})
- Elevation: 827 ft (252 m)

Population (2020)
  - Total: 472
  - Density: 387.3/sq mi (149.54/km^{2})
- Time zone: UTC-6 (Central (CST))
  - Summer (DST): UTC-5 (CDT)
- ZIP code: 63344
- Area code: 573
- FIPS code: 29-22474
- GNIS feature ID: 2398837
- Website: www.eoliamo.gov

Eolia is a village in Pike County, Missouri, United States. As of the 2020 census, Eolia had a population of 472.

== History ==
Eolia was platted in 1881 along the railroad line. The community was named for Aeolus, the ruler of winds in Greek mythology, because the day on which the surveying was done was one of the windiest the surveyor had ever seen. . A post office called Eolia has been in operation since 1881.

The Griffith–McCune Farmstead Historic District and St. John's Episcopal Church are listed on the National Register of Historic Places.

== Geography ==
Eolia is located along US Route 61 one half mile north of the Pike-Lincoln county line.

According to the United States Census Bureau, the village has a total area of 1.23 square miles (3.19 km^{2}), of which 1.22 square miles (3.16 km^{2}) is land and 0.01 square miles (0.03 km^{2}) is water.

== Demographics ==
Historical population
Census	Pop.	Note	%±
1970	321		—
1980	401		24.9%
1990	389		−3.0%
2000	435		11.8%
2010	522		20.0%
2020	472		−9.6%
U.S. Decennial Census

=== 2010 census ===
As of the census of 2010, there were 522 people, 192 households, and 136 families living in the village. The population density was 427.9 inhabitants per square mile (165.2/km^{2}). There were 215 housing units at an average density of 176.2 per square mile (68.0/km^{2}). The racial makeup of the village was 91.0% White, 5.7% African American, 0.8% Native American, 1.3% from other races, and 1.1% from two or more races. Hispanic or Latino of any race were 2.9% of the population.

There were 192 households, of which 38.5% had children under the age of 18 living with them, 55.2% were married couples living together, 10.9% had a female householder with no husband present, 4.7% had a male householder with no wife present, and 29.2% were non-families. 24.5% of all households were made up of individuals, and 12.5% had someone living alone who was 65 years of age or older. The average household size was 2.67 and the average family size was 3.23.

The median age in the village was 32.6 years. 30.8% of residents were under the age of 18; 8.1% were between the ages of 18 and 24; 25.1% were from 25 to 44; 22.4% were from 45 to 64; and 13.6% were 65 years of age or older. The gender makeup of the village was 47.5% male and 52.5% female.

=== 2000 census ===
As of the census of 2000, there were 435 people, 181 households, and 121 families living in the village. The population density was 354.7 inhabitants per square mile (137.0/km^{2}). There were 199 housing units at an average density of 162.3 per square mile (62.7/km^{2}). The racial makeup of the village was 92.41% White, 5.75% African American, 0.23% Native American, 0.92% from other races, and 0.69% from two or more races. Hispanic or Latino of any race were 1.84% of the population.

There were 181 households, out of which 30.4% had children under the age of 18 living with them, 54.7% were married couples living together, 8.8% had a female householder with no husband present, and 33.1% were non-families. 27.1% of all households were made up of individuals, and 14.9% had someone living alone who was 65 years of age or older. The average household size was 2.40 and the average family size was 2.92.

In the village, the population was spread out, with 26.0% under the age of 18, 9.4% from 18 to 24, 23.4% from 25 to 44, 24.8% from 45 to 64, and 16.3% who were 65 years of age or older. The median age was 38 years. For every 100 females, there were 90.0 males. For every 100 females age 18 and over, there were 80.9 males.

The median income for a household in the village was $35,104, and the median income for a family was $40,833. Males had a median income of $31,484 versus $20,461 for females. The per capita income for the village was $14,445. About 14.8% of families and 17.8% of the population were below the poverty line, including 25.9% of those under age 18 and 10.2% of those age 65 or over.
