= Griffith–McCune Farmstead Historic District =

Historic district in Missouri, United States

- U.S. National Register of Historic Places
- U.S. Historic district
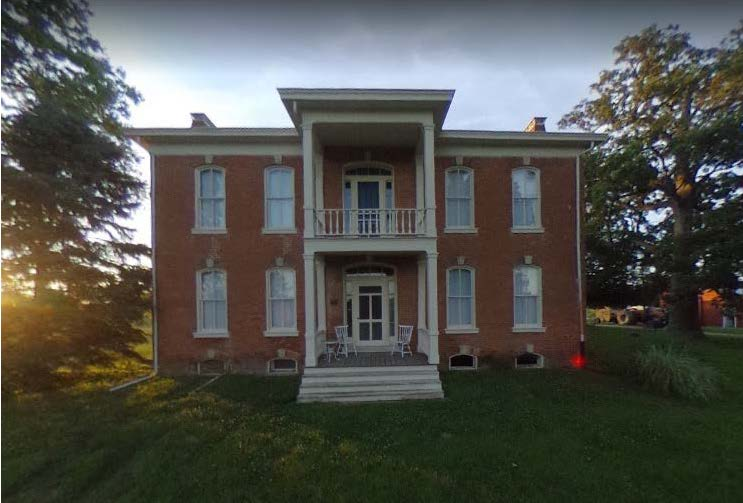

- Location within Missouri Location within the United States
- Location: MO WW E of jct. with MO D,, near Eolia, Missouri
- Coordinates: 39°17′22″N 90°58′17″W
- Area: 2 acres (0.81 ha)
- Built: 1870
- Built by: McCardie, Overton Broadhead
- Architectural style: I-house
- NRHP reference No.: 92001001
- Added to NRHP: August 18, 1992

Griffith–McCune Farmstead Historic District, also known as Rockford Farm, is a historic home and farm and national historic district located near Eolia, Pike County, Missouri. The district encompasses seven contributing buildings on a farm developed in the late-19th and early-20th centuries. They are the brick I-house and brick smokehouse (c. 1870); four frame outbuildings (privy, chicken house, wagon shed and feed shed, c. 1890); and an octagonal barn with center silo (c. 1910).

It was listed on the National Register of Historic Places in 1992.
