= North Third Street Historic District (Louisiana, Missouri) =

Historic district in Missouri, United States

- U.S. National Register of Historic Places
- U.S. Historic district
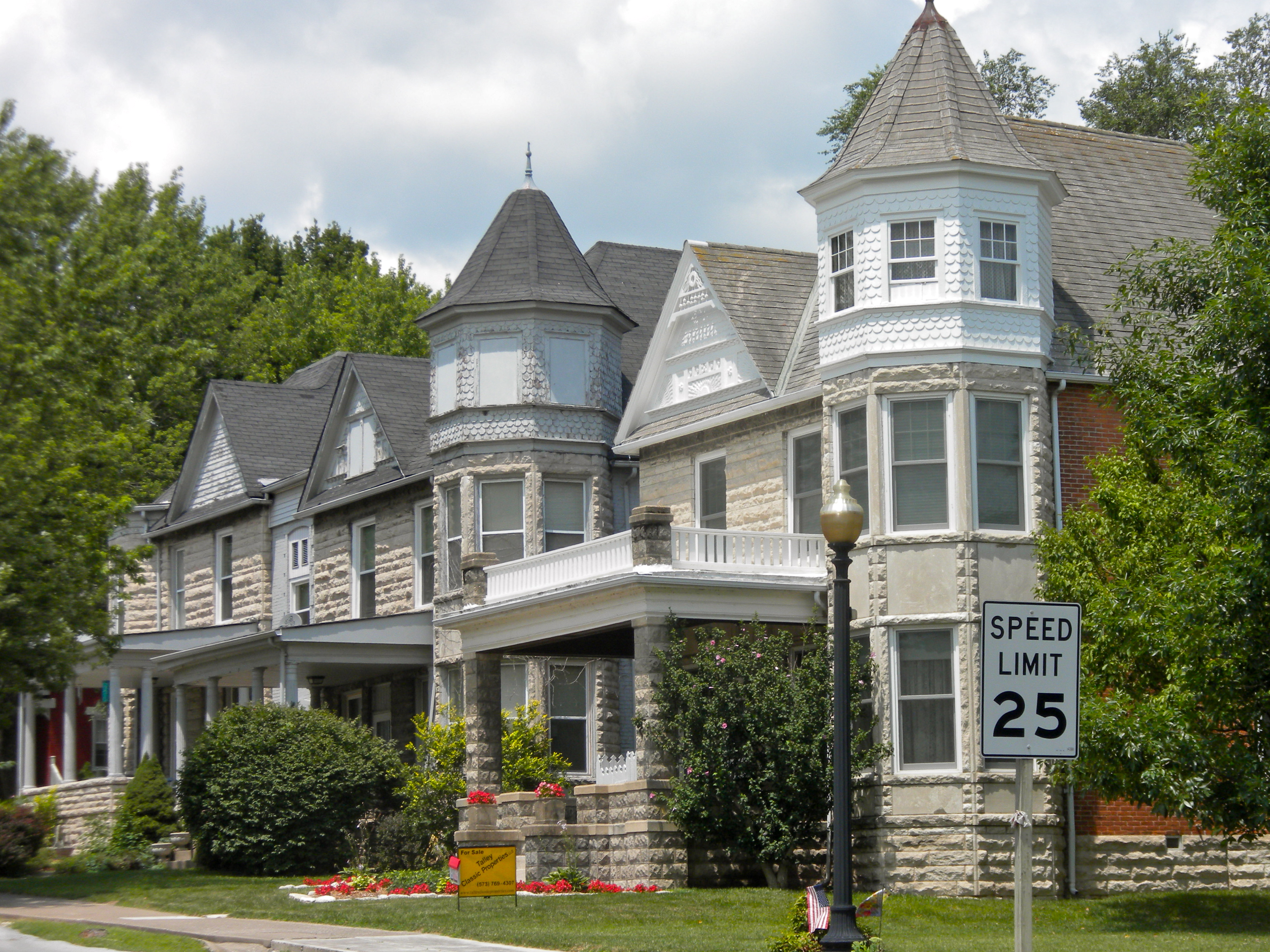
- North Third Street Historic District, July 2010

- Location within Missouri Location within the United States
- Location: Roughly bounded by Georgia, Noyes, North Third and North Water Sts., Louisiana, Missouri
- Coordinates: 39°27′14″N 91°02′56″W
- Area: 17 acres (6.9 ha)
- Built: 1843
- Built by: Baird, Powhatan; et.al.
- Architectural style: Mid 19th Century Revival, Late Victorian
- MPS: Louisiana, Missouri MPS
- NRHP reference No.: 05000912
- Added to NRHP: August 24, 2005

North Third Street Historic District is a national historic district located at Louisiana, Pike County, Missouri. The district encompasses 61 contributing buildings, one contributing site, and contributing structure in a predominantly residential section of Louisiana. It developed between about 1843 and 1935 and includes representative examples of Greek Revival, Gothic Revival, Italianate, Queen Anne, Colonial Revival, and Bungalow/American Craftsman style architecture. Located in the district are the separately listed Louisiana Public Library and Luce-Dyer House. Other notable buildings include the William C. Hardin House (c. 1843), James H. Johnson House (c. 1861), Edward G. McQuie House (c. 1858), St. Joseph's Catholic Church (1874), and Frank Boehm, Jr. House.

It was listed on the National Register of Historic Places in 2005.
