= Guinns Creek =

Stream in the American state of Missouri

Guinns Creek is a stream in southeastern Pike County of eastern Missouri. It is a tributary of Bryants Creek.

The headwaters arise at the confluence of the North and South forks just north of the Pike-Lincoln county line at 39°13′46″N 90°55′41″W. The stream gains the tributary of Killdergen Creek just north of the community of Sledd and just before passing under Missouri Route W. The confluence with Bryants Creek is approximately one mile southeast of Annada and one-half mile east of Missouri Route 79 at 39°15′06″N 90°48′33″W.

Guinns Creek has the name of George Guinn, the original owner of the site.

== See also ==
- List of rivers of Missouri
