= Bishop Creek =

Bishop Creek may refer to:

- Bishop Creek, former name of Bishop, California
- Bishop Creek (Inyo County) in Inyo County, California
- Bishop Creek (Mariposa County, California)
- Baxter Creek in Contra Costa County, California
- Bishop Creek (Forest Creek tributary), a stream in Oregon

== See also ==
- Bishop Branch
