= Buckner Hollow =

Valley in the American state of Missouri

Coordinates: 39°22′26″N 91°09′17″W

Buckner Hollow is a valley in Pike County in the U.S. state of Missouri. It is a tributary of Noix Creek which it enters just west of the community of Vera. The stream in the upper section of Buckner Hollow is damned to form the Bowling Green Reservoir.

Buckner Hollow has the name of D. B. Buckner, the original owner of the site. Part of the valley, including the site of a former schoolhouse, has been inundated by the Bowling Green Reservoir.
