= Killdergen Creek =

Stream in the American state of Missouri

Coordinates: 39°13′57″N 90°53′34″W

Killdergen Creek is a stream in northeast Lincoln and southeast Pike counties in the U.S. state of Missouri. It is a tributary of Guinns Creek which it meets just northwest of the community of Sledd.

Killdergen Creek has the name of a pioneer citizen.

== See also ==
- List of rivers of Missouri
