= Calumet Creek =

Stream in the US state of Missouri

Coordinates: 39°22′44″N 90°55′15″W

Calumet Creek is a stream in Pike County in the U.S. state of Missouri. It is a tributary of the Mississippi River. The stream headwaters arise at at an elevation of about 830 feet. The source area is about one mile east of the community of Edgewood and U.S. Route 61 and the stream flows to the northeast passing south of the community of Calumet. The stream continues to the northeast and enters the Mississippi about one mile northwest of Clarksville. The confluence is at and an elevation of 449 feet.

Calumet Creek derives its name from a colonial-era term for a certain type of Native American ceremonial pipe.

== See also ==
- List of rivers of Missouri
