= Peno Creek =

Stream in the American state of Missouri

Peno Creek is a stream in the Pike County in northeastern Missouri. The stream headwaters are north of U. S. Route 54 just west of Bowling Green. The stream flows northwest paralleling U. S. Route 61 then passes under Route 61 south of Frankford and continues north to northeast until reaching its confluence with the Salt River just south of the Pike-Ralls county line.

The stream source is at 39°20′35″N 91°17′29″W and the confluence is at 39°32′13″N 91°16′09″W.

The meaning of the name "Peno" is obscure; it possibly is derived from an unidentified Native American language.

== See also ==
- List of rivers of Missouri
