= Ashley, Missouri =

- Census-Designated Place
- Building in Ashley
- Interactive map of Ashley, Missouri
- Coordinates: 39°15′13″N 91°13′26″W
- Country: United States
- State: Missouri
- County: Pike

Area
  - Total: 1.32 sq mi (3.43 km^{2})
  - Land: 1.32 sq mi (3.41 km^{2})
  - Water: 0.0077 sq mi (0.02 km^{2})
- Elevation: 738 ft (225 m)

Population (2020)
  - Total: 94
  - Density: 71.3/sq mi (27.53/km^{2})
- zip code: 63334
- FIPS code: 29-02260
- GNIS feature ID: 2587051

Ashley is a census-designated place in Pike County, Missouri, United States. It has a population of 94 in the 2020 census. It is located on Route 161, approximately six miles south of Bowling Green.

Ashley was platted in 1836. The community was named for William Henry Ashley, who served as lieutenant governor in the 1820s. A post office called Ashley was established in 1835, and remained in operation until 1965.

== Demographics ==
Historical population
Census	Pop.	Note	%±
2020	94		—
U.S. Decennial Census

== Transportation ==
While there is no fixed-route transit service in Ashley, intercity bus service is provided by Burlington Trailways in nearby Bowling Green.
