= Saint Clement, Missouri =

- Census-designated place
- Location of Saint Clement in Missouri
- Coordinates: 39°16′58″N 91°12′35″W
- Country: United States
- State: Missouri
- County: Pike
- Named after: Clement of Rome

Area
  - Total: 0.28 sq mi (0.72 km^{2})
  - Land: 0.27 sq mi (0.71 km^{2})
  - Water: 0 sq mi (0.00 km^{2})
- Elevation: 817 ft (249 m)

Population (2020)
  - Total: 76
  - Density: 275.4/sq mi (106.35/km^{2})
- Time zone: UTC-6 (Central (CST))
  - Summer (DST): UTC-5 (CDT)
- ZIP code: 63334
- Area code: 573
- FIPS code: 29-29163
- GNIS feature ID: 2631647

Saint Clement is a census-designated place in Pike County, Missouri, United States, located on Route 161 approximately four miles south of Bowling Green.

The first settlement at St. Clement, named for Clement of Rome, was made in 1870 by a colony of German Catholics. A post office called Saint Clement was established in 1870, and remained in operation until 1882.

== Demographics ==
Historical population
Census	Pop.	Note	%±
2020	76		—
U.S. Decennial Census

== Transportation ==
While there is no fixed-route transit service in St. Clement, intercity bus service is provided by Burlington Trailways in nearby Bowling Green.
