= McCune, Missouri =

Unincorporated community in Missouri, United States

Coordinates: 39°24′20″N 91°14′46″W

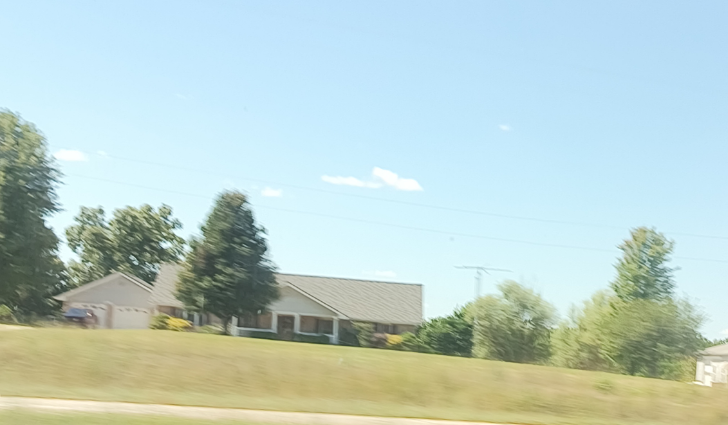
McCune in 2025

McCune is an unincorporated community in Pike County, in the U.S. state of Missouri.

The community is on Missouri Route U just west of the intersection with US Route 61. Peno Creek flows past about a quarter mile to the west. Bowling Green is six miles to the southeast on Route 61.

== History ==
Variant names were "McCunes" and "McCune Station". A post office called McCunes Station was established in 1879, and remained in operation until 1920. The community has the name of John and William McCune, pioneer citizens.
