= Clarksville Historic District (Clarksville, Missouri) =

Historic district in Missouri, United States

- U.S. National Register of Historic Places
- U.S. Historic district
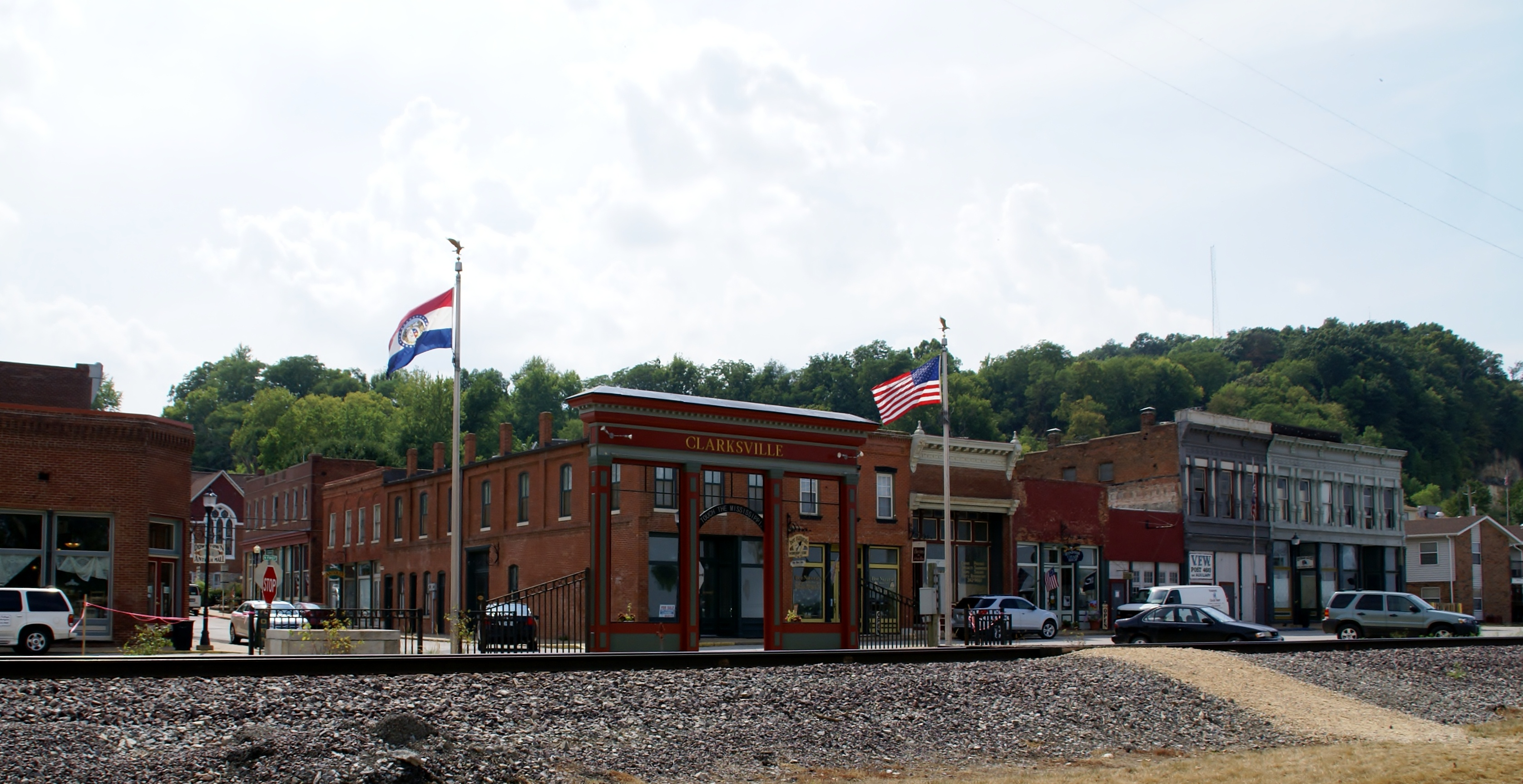

- Location within Missouri Location within the United States
- Location: Roughly bounded by Lewis, Front, Virginia and 3rd Sts., Clarksville, Missouri
- Coordinates: 39°22′11″N 90°54′16″W
- Area: 16.3 acres (6.6 ha)
- Architectural style: Greek Revival, Italianate, Queen Anne
- MPS: Clarksville MPS
- NRHP reference No.: 91000489
- Added to NRHP: May 9, 1991

Clarksville Historic District is a national historic district located at Clarksville, Pike County, Missouri. The district encompasses 65 contributing buildings in the central business district and surrounding residential sections of Clarksville. It developed between about 1840 and 1930, and includes representative examples of Greek Revival, Italianate, and Queen Anne style architecture. Located in the district is the separately listed Clifford-Wyrick House. Other notable buildings include the City Hall (1910), Sentinel Building (1867-1871), Clifford Banking Company (c. 1887), La Crosse Lumber Company (1923), Presbyterian Church, Methodist Church (1906), Masonic Temple (1903), and Clarksville Public Library (1910).

It was listed on the National Register of Historic Places in 1991.
