= Tarrants, Missouri =

Village in Pike County, Missouri, United States

- Village
- Location of Tarrants, Missouri
- Coordinates: 39°21′27″N 91°11′01″W
- Country: United States
- State: Missouri
- County: Pike
- Incorporated: 1964

Area
  - Total: 0.042 sq mi (0.11 km^{2})
  - Land: 0.042 sq mi (0.11 km^{2})
  - Water: 0 sq mi (0.00 km^{2})
- Elevation: 738 ft (225 m)

Population (2020)
  - Total: 22
  - Density: 507.2/sq mi (195.85/km^{2})
- Time zone: UTC-6 (Central (CST))
  - Summer (DST): UTC-5 (CDT)
- ZIP code: 63334
- Area code: 573
- FIPS code: 29-72376
- GNIS feature ID: 2399956

Tarrants is a village in central Pike County, Missouri, United States. As of the 2020 census, Tarrants had a population of 22.

== Geography ==
Tarrants is located approximately one mile northeast of Bowling Green on Missouri Route AA.

According to the United States Census Bureau, the village has a total area of 0.04 square miles (0.10 km^{2}), all land.

== Demographics ==
Historical population
Census	Pop.	Note	%±
1970	45		—
1980	50		11.1%
1990	43		−14.0%
2000	30		−30.2%
2010	22		−26.7%
2020	22		0.0%
U.S. Decennial Census

=== 2010 census ===
At the 2010 census there were 22 people, 12 households, and 9 families living in the village. The population density was 550.0 inhabitants per square mile (212.4/km^{2}). There were 13 housing units at an average density of 325.0 per square mile (125.5/km^{2}). The racial makup of the village was 100.0% White. Hispanic or Latino of any race were 4.5%.

Of the 12 households 8.3% had children under the age of 18 living with them, 58.3% were married couples living together, 16.7% had a female householder with no husband present, and 25.0% were non-families. 25.0% of households were one person and 16.6% were one person aged 65 or older. The average household size was 1.83 and the average family size was 2.11.

The median age in the village was 61.5 years. 4.5% of residents were under the age of 18; 9% were between the ages of 18 and 24; 13.5% were from 25 to 44; 36.3% were from 45 to 64; and 36.4% were 65 or older. The gender makeup of the village was 50.0% male and 50.0% female.

=== 2000 census ===
As of the census of 2000, there were 30 people, 15 households, and 10 families living in the village. The population density was 689.3 inhabitants per square mile (266.1/km^{2}). There were 15 housing units at an average density of 344.6 per square mile (133.1/km^{2}). The racial makup of the village was 96.67% White and 3.33% African American.

Of the 15 households 6.7% had children under the age of 18 living with them, 66.7% were married couples living together, and 33.3% were non-families. 20.0% of households were one person and 13.3% were one person aged 65 or older. The average household size was 2.00 and the average family size was 2.30.

The age distribution was 3.3% under the age of 18, 6.7% from 18 to 24, 20.0% from 25 to 44, 40.0% from 45 to 64, and 30.0% 65 or older. The median age was 57 years. For every 100 females, there were 114.3 males. For every 100 females age 18 and over, there were 107.1 males.

The median household income was $20,833 and the median income for a family was $20,833. Males had a median income of $21,250 versus $0 for females. The per capita income for the village was $11,358. None of the population and none of the families were below the poverty line.

== Transportation ==
While there is no fixed-route transit service in Tarrants, intercity bus service is provided by Burlington Trailways in nearby Bowling Green.

== See also ==
- List of cities in Missouri
