= Chad Perkins =

American politician (born 1978)

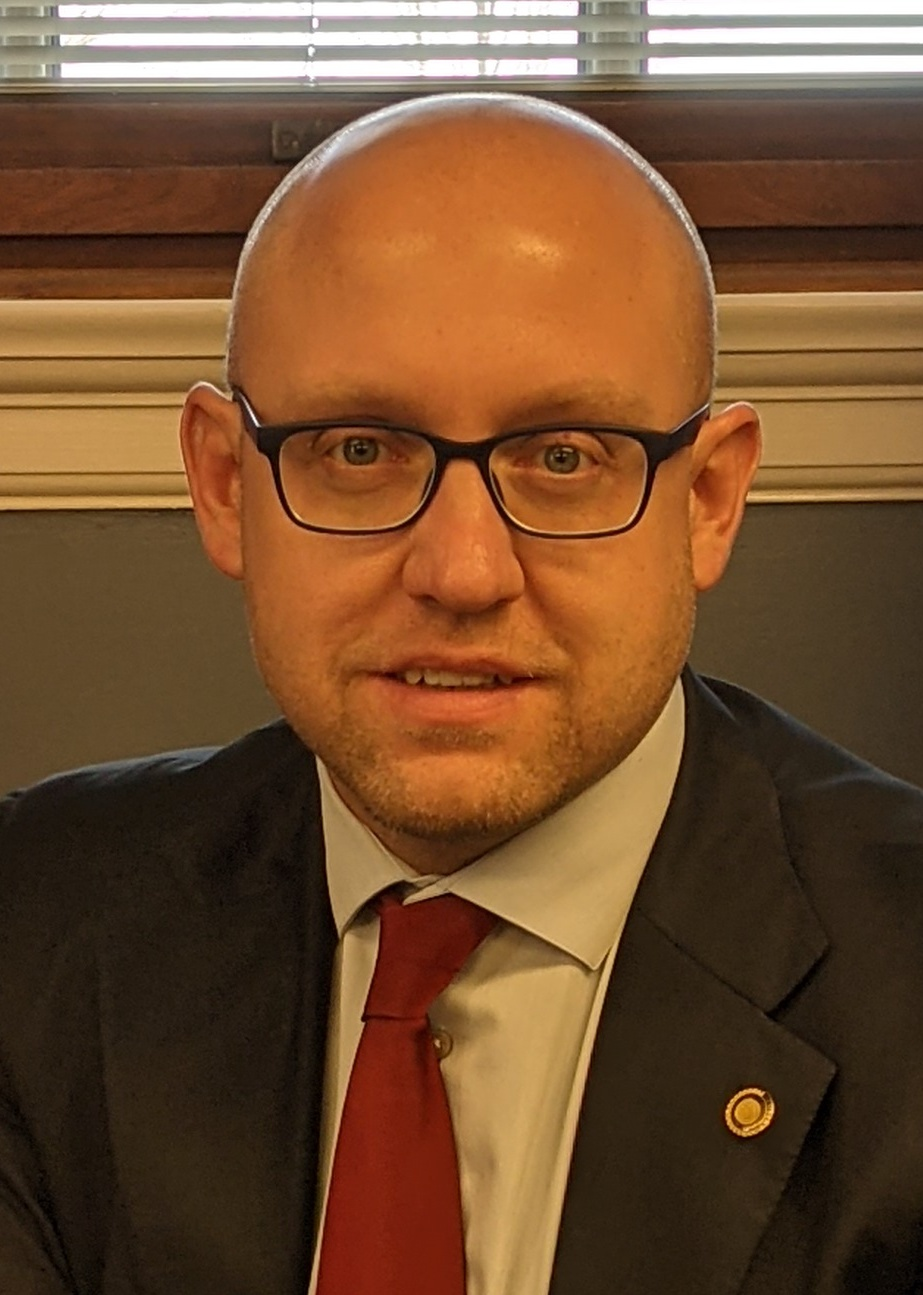

Speaker pro tempore of the Missouri House of Representatives
- Incumbent
- Assumed office January 8, 2025
- Preceded by: Mike Henderson

Member of the Missouri House of Representatives from the 40th district
- Incumbent
- Assumed office January 9, 2021
- Preceded by: Jim Hansen

Personal details
- Born: June 22, 1978 (age 48) Hannibal, Missouri, U.S.
- Party: Republican
- Education: John Wood Community College (attended); University of Missouri (attended)
- Website: State House website

Chad Perkins (born June 22, 1978) is an American politician, radio host and police officer from Bowling Green, Missouri. A member of the Republican Party, he has served in the Missouri House of Representatives since 2021. He represents the 40th district, which includes all of Pike and part of Lincoln counties in northeastern Missouri. Previously, Perkins served as the mayor of Bowling Green.

== Background ==
Perkins was born on June 22, 1978, in Hannibal, Missouri. He graduated from Bowling Green High School in 1997, attended John Wood Community College from 1997–1999 and the University of Missouri from 2000–2001. Perkins has worked as an on-air radio host at KJFM Radio since 2001, is a deputy sheriff for the Pike County Sheriff's Department, and is a former mayor of Bowling Green. As of May 27, 2021, Perkins' police license was not active.

== Political career ==
Perkins won the Republican primary election in August 2020 to replace fellow Republican incumbent Jim Hansen, who could not seek reelection due to Missouri's constitutional term limits. There was no Democrat running for the 40th District.

On May 27, 2021, the St. Louis Post-Dispatch reported that when Perkins was working as a police officer in 2015, a report alleged he had received a "sexual favor" from an intoxicated 19-year-old. The woman also asked Perkins to help her get alcohol and the prescription drug Adderall. The report also said Pike County Sheriff Stephen Korte had obstructed a probe into Perkins as he was running for office, saying, "do everything we can to get Chad elected". Perkins said their relationship was consensual and called the controversy "political sour grapes" from a personal feud with Frankford, Missouri police chief Josh Baker. Speaker of the House Rob Vescovo said he had been made aware of the report and had forwarded information to the House Ethics Committee, and Sirena Wissler, the civil rights coordinator of the United States Department of Justice's St. Louis office, said she had forwarded information to the FBI and said Perkins "needs to get the hell out of the legislature". The Missouri State Highway Patrol began reviewing the allegations.

In January 2024, Perkins filed legislation to abolish the death penalty, citing it as a pro-life issue.

In February 2025, Perkins filed a bill to indirectly remove Cotton Walker as Cole County circuit court judge, telling media that he fundamentally disagrees with Walker's court decisions.

== Electoral history ==
Missouri House of Representatives Primary Election, August 4, 2020, District 40
Party	Candidate	Votes	%	±%
Republican	Chad Perkins	3,853	50.63%	
Republican	Ron Staggs	1,575	20.70%	
Republican	Heather Dodd	1,488	19.55%	
Republican	Thomas (Tommy) Schultz	400	5.26%	
Republican	Woodrow Polston	294	3.86%	
Total votes		7,610	100.00%	

Missouri House of Representatives Election, November 3, 2020, District 40
Party	Candidate	Votes	%	±%
Republican	Chad Perkins	14,559	100.00%	n/a
Total votes		14,559	100.00%	

Missouri House of Representatives Primary Election, August 2, 2022, District 40
Party	Candidate	Votes	%	±%
Republican	Chad Perkins	3,285	55.84%	+5.21
Republican	Dan Moran	2,598	44.16%	n/a
Total votes		5,883	100.00%	

Missouri House of Representatives Election, November 8, 2022, District 40
Party	Candidate	Votes	%	±%
Republican	Chad Perkins	10,582	100.00%	0.00
Total votes		10,582	100.00%	

Missouri House of Representatives
Preceded by Mike Henderson	Speaker pro tempore of the Missouri House of Representatives; 2025–present	Incumbent
