= New Hartford, Missouri =

Unincorporated community in Missouri, United States

Coordinates: 39°11′58″N 91°16′13″W

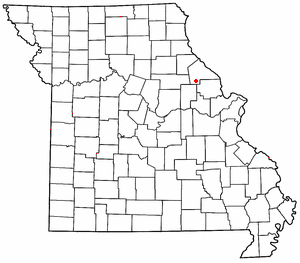

New Hartford is an unincorporated community in southern Pike County, Missouri, United States. It is located on Route 161, approximately fourteen miles south of Bowling Green.

New Hartford was platted in 1871, taking its name from Hartford Township. A post office called New Hartford was established in 1871, and remained in operation until 1997.
