= James Hansen (disambiguation) =

James Hansen (born 1941) is an American scientist and former head of the NASA Goddard Institute for Space Studies.

James or Jim Hansen may also refer to:

- James Hansen (politician) (1884–1951), member of the Legislative Assembly of Alberta
- James R. Hansen, American historian and author of First Man: The Life of Neil A. Armstrong
- James Lee Hansen, American sculptor
- Jim Hansen (Idaho politician) (born 1959), American politician from Idaho
- Jim Hansen (Missouri politician) (born 1947), American politician from Missouri
- Jim Hansen (Utah politician) (1932–2018), American politician from Utah
- J. Clifford Hansen (1893–1967), mayor of Murray, Utah

== See also ==
- James Hanson (disambiguation)
