= Northern Methodist Episcopal Church of Clarksville =

Historic church in Missouri, United States

- U.S. National Register of Historic Places
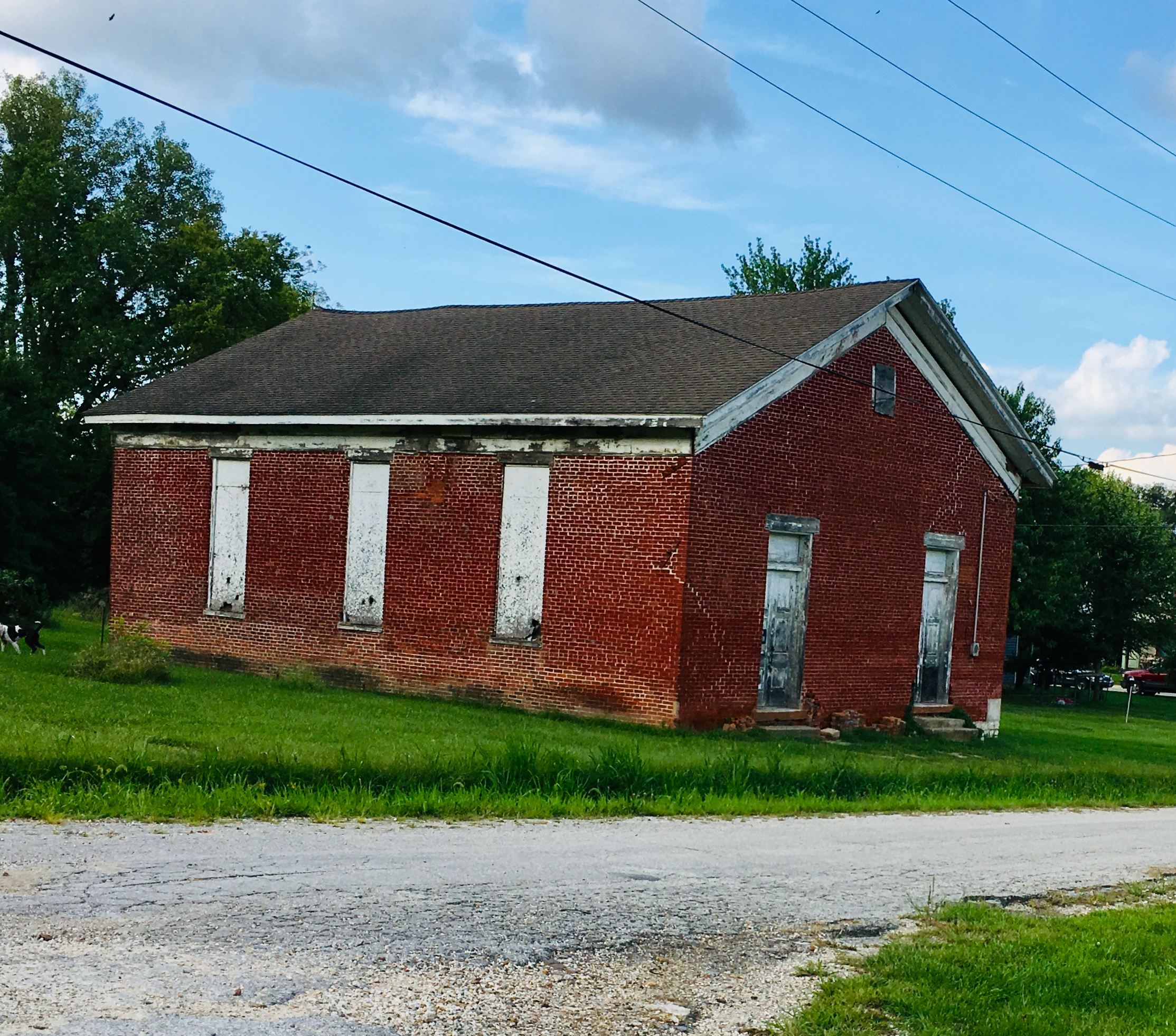

- Location within Missouri Location within the United States
- Location: 309 Smith St., Clarksville, Missouri
- Coordinates: 39°22′3″N 90°54′14″W
- Area: less than one acre
- Built: 1866, 1915
- Architectural style: Greek Revival
- MPS: Clarksville MPS
- NRHP reference No.: 91000487
- Added to NRHP: May 9, 1991

Northern Methodist Episcopal Church of Clarksville, also known as Bryant Chapel AME, is a historic African Methodist Episcopal church located at 309 Smith Street in Clarksville, Pike County, Missouri. It was built in 1866 and remodeled in 1915, and is a one-story, rectangular, Greek Revival style brick church. It has a front gable roof.

It was listed on the National Register of Historic Places in 1991.
