= Calumet, Missouri =

Unincorporated community in Missouri

Coordinates: 39°19′37″N 91°00′43″W

Calumet is an unincorporated community in eastern Pike County, in the U.S. state of Missouri. The community is located at the intersection of Missouri routes N and D about six miles southwest of Clarkesville and six miles north of Eolia. Calumet Creek flows past to the south of the community.

== History ==
A post office called Calumet was established in 1872, and remained in operation until 1907. The community was named after nearby Calumet Creek.
