= New Harmony, Missouri =

Unincorporated community in Missouri, United States

Coordinates: 39°17′39″N 91°22′30″W

New Harmony is an unincorporated community in western Pike County, in the U.S. state of Missouri. The community is on a county road just east of Missouri Route V about six miles east of Vandalia and four miles south-southeast of Curryville.

== History ==
New Harmony was platted in 1857. A post office called New Harmony was established in 1858, and remained in operation until 1904. A variant name was "Harmony". The name may be a transfer from Harmony, Kentucky.
