= Calumet Township, Pike County, Missouri =

Inactive township in the U.S. state of Missouri

Coordinates: 39.3061°N 90.8964°W

Calumet Township is an inactive township in Pike County, in the U.S. state of Missouri.

Calumet Township was erected in 1819, taking its name from Calumet Creek.
