= Vera, Missouri =

Unincorporated community in Missouri, United States

Coordinates: 39°22′42″N 91°08′43″W

Vera is an unincorporated community in Pike County, in the U.S. state of Missouri. The community is located 5.5 miles northeast of Bowling Green along US Route 54. Noix Creek flows past the north side of the community.

== History ==
A post office called Vera was established in 1902, and remained in operation until 1942. An early settler named the community after his daughter, Vera Spears. A variant name was "Watson".
