= Clifford-Wyrick House =

Historic house in Missouri, United States

- U.S. National Register of Historic Places
- U.S. Historic district – Contributing property
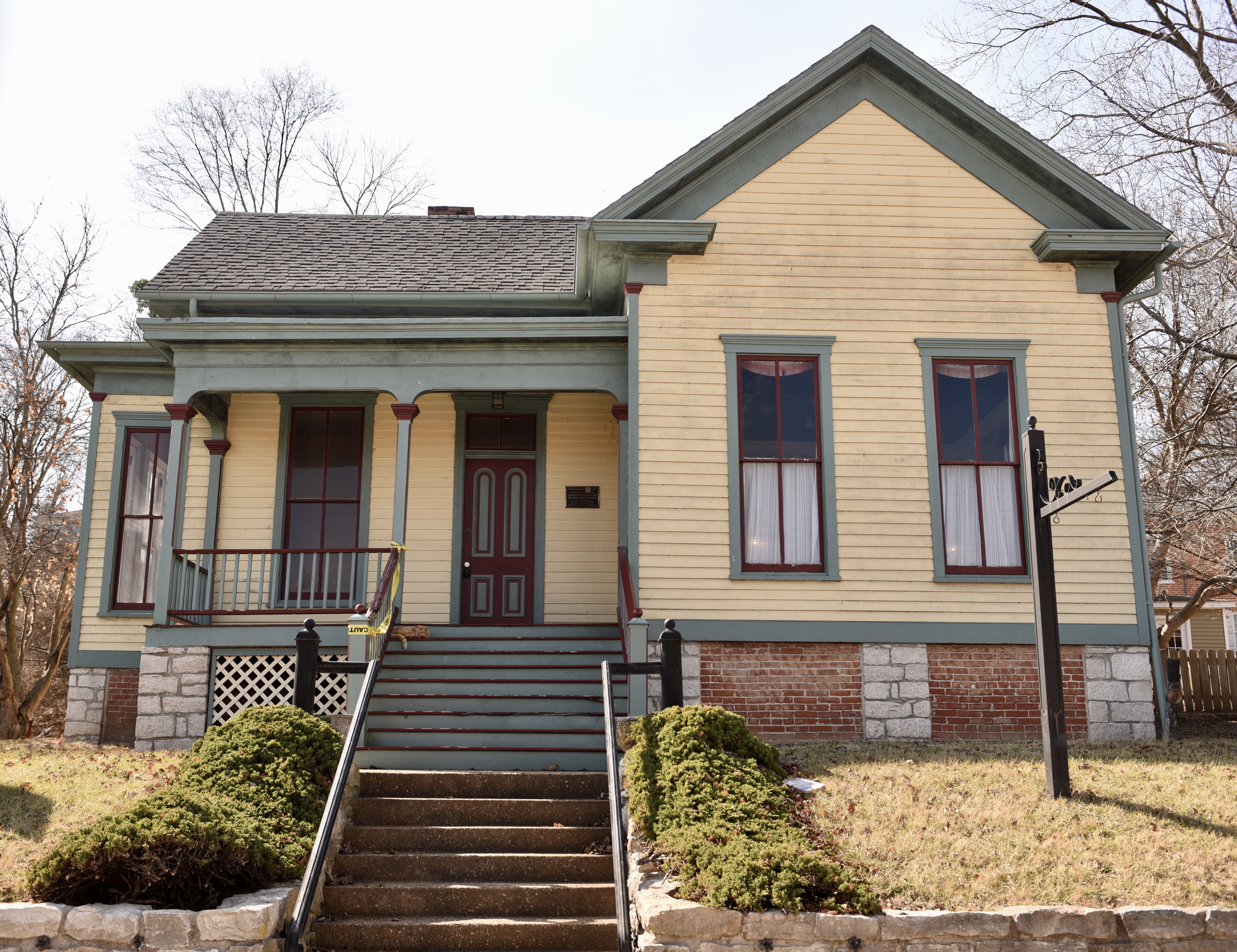

- Location within Missouri Location within the United States
- Location: 105 S. 2nd Street, Clarksville, Missouri
- Coordinates: 39°22′13″N 90°54′18″W
- Area: less than one acre
- Built: 1878
- Built by: Clifford, B.P.
- Architectural style: Italianate
- NRHP reference No.: 84002600
- Added to NRHP: July 9, 1984

The Clifford-Wyrick House is a historic house located at 105 South Second Street in Clarksville, Pike County, Missouri.

== Description and history ==
It was constructed in 1878, and is a one-story, irregularly-shaped, vernacular Italianate style frame dwelling. It is sheathed in clapboard siding. It features a two-bay porch across the south part of the facade and projecting gabled bays.

It was listed on the National Register of Historic Places on July 9, 1984. It is located in the Clarksville Historic District.
