= Turner-Pharr House =

Historic house in Missouri, United States

- U.S. National Register of Historic Places
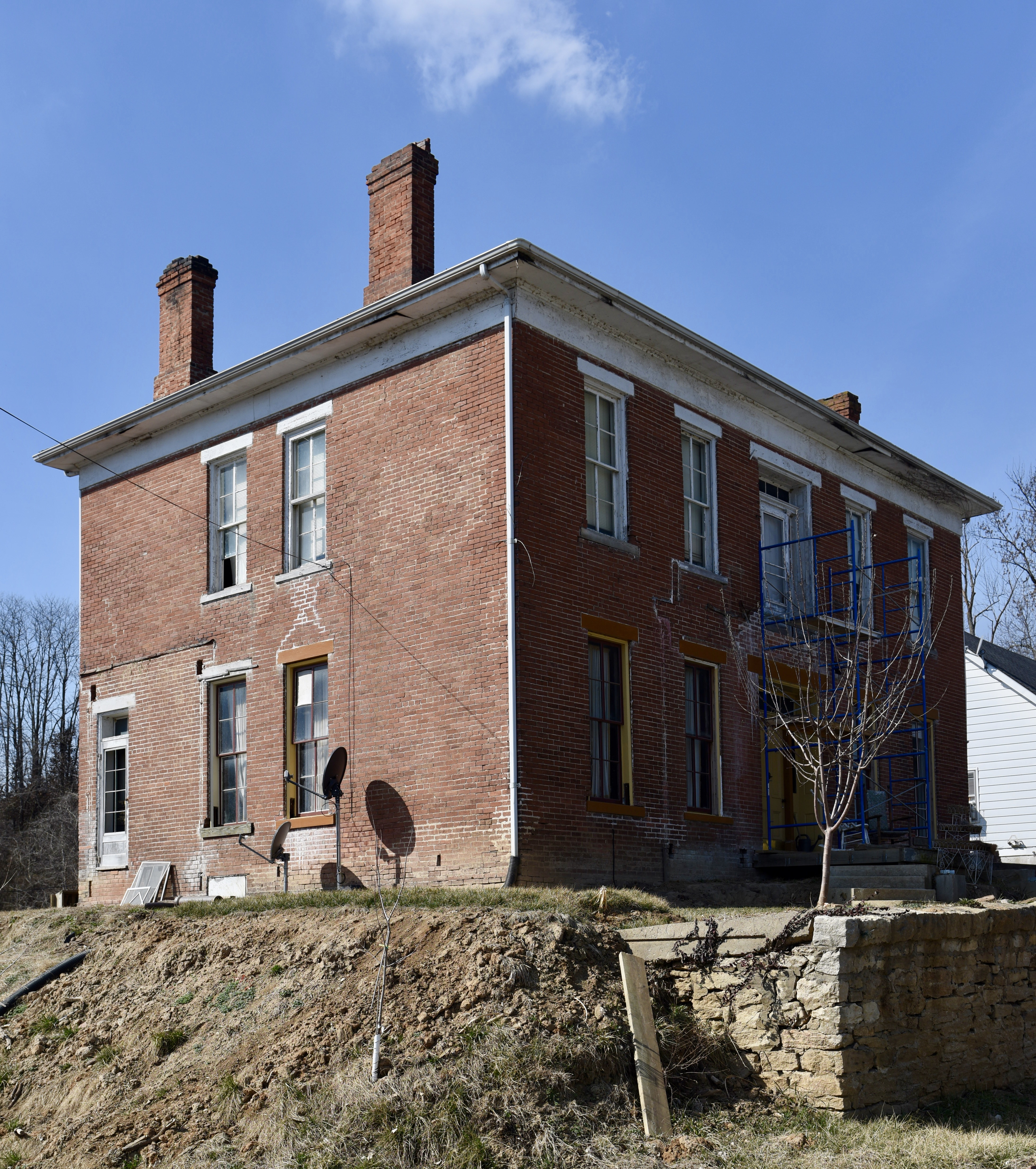

- Location within Missouri Location within the United States
- Location: 101 N. Fourth St. Clarksville, Missouri
- Coordinates: 39°22′11″N 90°54′25″W
- Area: less than one acre
- Built: 1867
- Architectural style: Greek Revival, Italianate
- MPS: Clarksville MPS
- NRHP reference No.: 91000488
- Added to NRHP: May 9, 1991

Turner-Pharr House is a historic home located at Clarksville, Pike County, Missouri. It was built about 1867, and is a two-story, five bay by three bay, transitional Greek Revival / Italianate style brick dwelling. It has a hipped roof. It features a three-bay front porch with Doric order columns that may date to about 1900.

It was listed on the National Register of Historic Places in 1991.
