= Estes, Missouri =

Unincorporated community in Missouri, United States

Coordinates: 39°14′12″N 91°22′35″W

Estes is an unincorporated community in southwestern Pike County, in the U.S. state of Missouri. The community is on Missouri Route Y approximately eleven miles southwest of Bowling Green. The elevation of Estes is 738 feet.

== History ==
A post office called Estes was established in 1886, and remained in operation until 1906. The community has the name of one Mr. Estes, a local merchant.
