= Gazette, Missouri =

Unincorporated community in Missouri, United States

Gazette
- Unincorporated community
- Interactive map of Gazette
- Coordinates: 39°12′16″N 91°23′46″W
- Country: United States
- State: Missouri
- County: Pike
- Post office established: 1887
- Time zone: UTC−6 (CST)
  - Summer (DST): UTC−5 (CDT)

Gazette is an unincorporated community in southwest Pike County, in the U.S. state of Missouri. The community is located approximately 6.5 miles west of New Hartford. The Pike-Audrain county line is 1.3 miles to the west along Missouri Route K.

== History ==
A post office called Gazette was established in 1887, and remained in operation until 1932. It is unknown why the name "Gazette" was applied to this community.
