= Henderson Branch =

Stream in the American state of Missouri

Coordinates: 39.2161535°N 91.3220950°W

Henderson Branch is a stream in Pike County in the U.S. state of Missouri. It is a tributary of Roundtop Branch.

Henderson Branch has the name of William Henderson, the original owner of the site.

== See also ==
- List of rivers of Missouri
