= Bishop Branch =

Stream in the American state of Missouri

Coordinates: 39.4281017°N 91.0698598°W

Bishop Branch is a stream in Pike County in the U.S. state of Missouri. It is a tributary of Noix Creek.

Bishop Branch has the name of Joshua Bishop, a pioneer settler. Joshua Bishop came to the Missouri Territory about 1812 with a group from York County, South Carolina, including the Templeton, Jordan, Turner and Johnson families. They settled in St. Charles County, from which Pike County was created in 1817.

== See also ==
- List of rivers of Missouri
