= Cyrene, Missouri =

Unincorporated community in Missouri, United States

Coordinates: 39°17′11″N 91°06′24″W

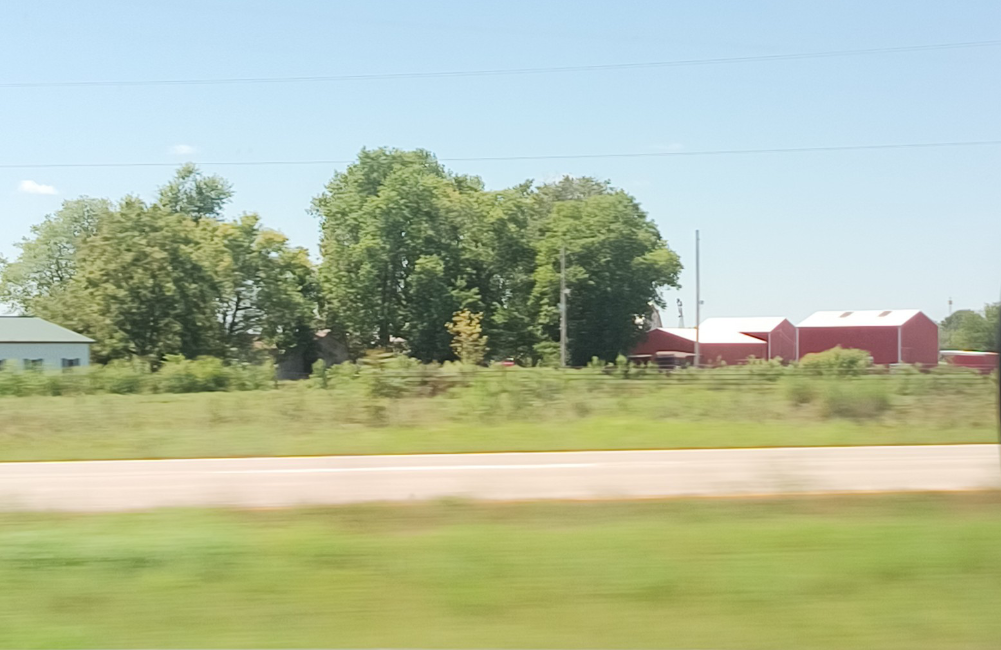
Cyrene in 2025

Cyrene is an unincorporated community in southeast Pike County, in the U.S. state of Missouri. The community is on US Route 61 approximately six miles southeast of Bowling Green.

== History ==
A post office called Cyrene was established in 1879, and remained in operation until 1964. The community was named after the Ancient Greek colony of Cyrene, Libya, which was mentioned in the Bible.
