= Rufus Riddlesbarger =

American entrepreneur

Rufus Riddlesbarger (18 September 1893 – 1968) was an American entrepreneur who marketed a line of contraceptive diaphragms in the 1930s. Under the Lanteen Laboratories brand, Riddlesbarger operated a chain of clinics in Illinois, Wisconsin and Michigan, which were promoted through radio advertising.

== Career ==
Riddlesbarger is believed to have been an Army Air Corps pilot during World War I. He later worked for the U.S. Post Office, flying air mail starting in 1920, but was grounded in 1921 for failing to promptly report a forced landing, resulting in delay to the mail. Riddlesbarger invented a diaphragm that was successfully marketed through his firm, Lanteen Laboratories, using storefront clinics called "Medical Bureaus of Birth Control Information" and a variety of media, including radio, direct mailings to doctors, and in packages of sanitary napkins. One of Riddlesbarger's clinic operators, Adele Gordon, was, with her husband John, unsuccessfully prosecuted in 1935 in Milwaukee, Wisconsin for selling birth control devices. Lanteen Laboratories had been organized in 1928, with 90% of its stock owned by Riddlesbarger. Lanteen sold a comprehensive line of products, including contraceptive jellies, douches, tampons and suppositories.

== Ranch ==
The proceeds from Riddlesbarger's venture went to purchase a ranch in southern Arizona which he named Lanteen Ranch, now listed on the National Register of Historic Places as Kinjockity Ranch. Riddlesbarger commissioned Phoenix architect Edward C. Morgan to design the Pueblo Revival house and guest house, and the interior was decorated by designer and sculptor Raymond Phillips Sanderson. Riddlesbarger, through the Lanteen Arabian Foundation, bred Arabian horses at the ranch, most notably owning Antez, a famous sire originally owned by Will Keith Kellogg. Antez sired Palominos while with Riddlesbarger. Bamboo Harvester, who played Mister Ed in the eponymous television show, was a grandson of Antez.

== Legal problems ==
Although he intended to live at the ranch full-time, Riddlesbarger sold the ranch in 1946 and moved to Tucson. He had lost a substantial judgment in tax court over Lanteen's purchase of the ranch lands and subsequent payment of the ranch to him as a dividend. He was unsuccessfully prosecuted in 1948 for statutory rape for an alleged affair with a house servant, and left the United States shortly thereafter. A final divorce decree was granted in favor of his former wife Fay Riddlesbarger in 1948, apparently concluding proceedings that began in 1931 that had been accompanied by allegations of coercion, but further appeals continued into 1952, reaching the Illinois Supreme Court. Rufus had two daughters with Fay.

== Africa ==
In the 1950s Riddlesbarger settled in east Africa in what was then Tanganyika, where he was involved in more litigation. During that time he established Manyara Ranch near Esilalei in the northern part of what is now Tanzania. Following two more marriages, he died in Addis Ababa in 1968.
