= James Hanson =

James Hanson may refer to:

- James Hanson, Baron Hanson (1922–2004), English industrialist
- Jimmy Hanson (footballer, born 1904) (1904–?), English footballer for Manchester United
- James Hanson (footballer, born 1987), English footballer for Grimsby Town
- Jamie Hanson (born 1995), English footballer for Derby County
- James Hanson (rugby union) (born 1988), Australian rugby union player (hooker) for Queensland Reds
- James C. Hanson (1862–1946), American politician

== See also ==
- James Hansen (disambiguation)
