= Lock and Dam No. 24 =

Dam in Illinois and Missouri, U.S.

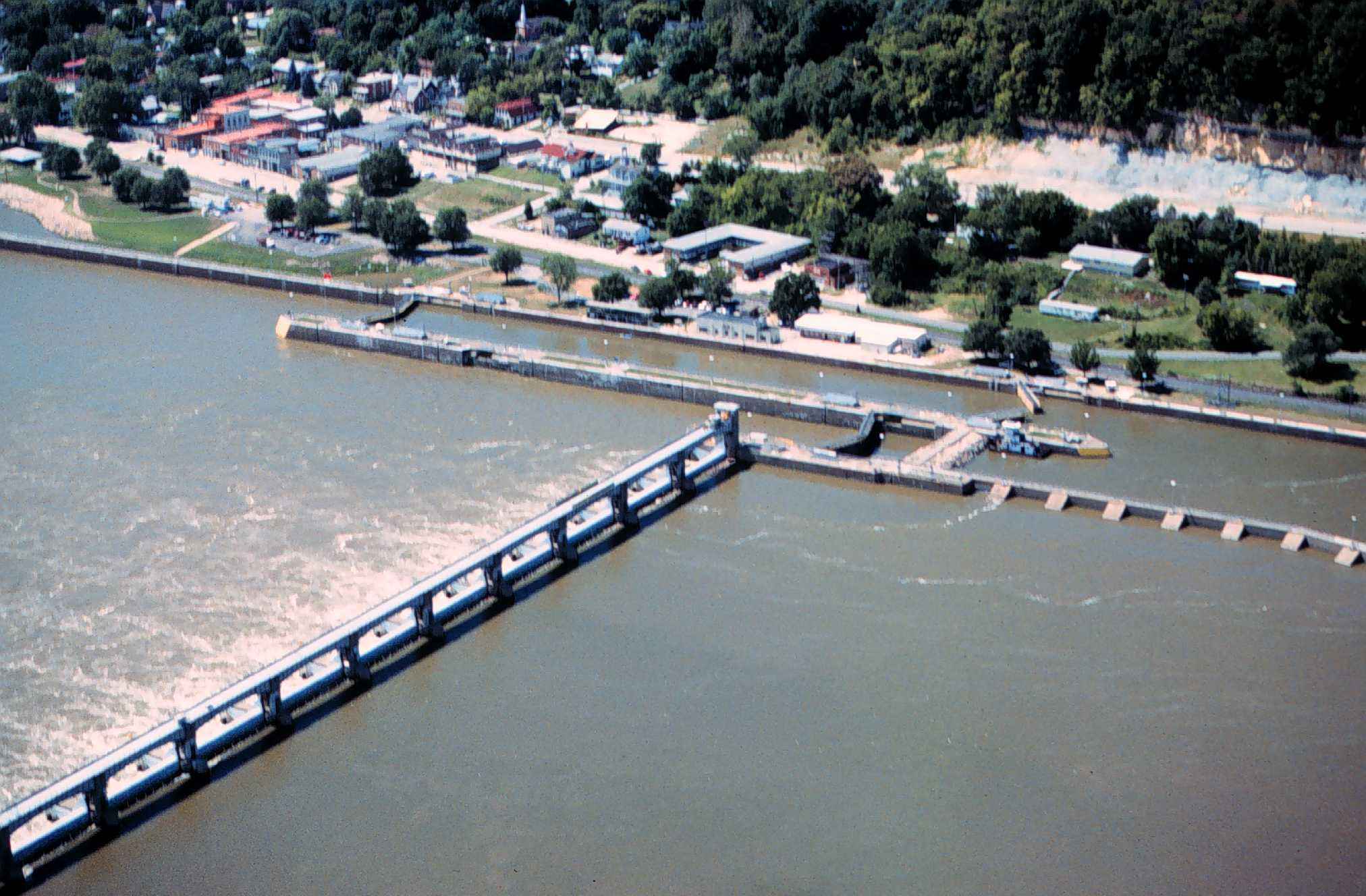
- Mississippi River Lock and Dam No. 24
- Interactive map of Lock and Dam No. 24
- Location: Belleview Precinct, Calhoun County, Illinois / Clarksville, Missouri, USA
- Coordinates: 39°22′36″N 90°54′30″W
- Construction began: July 1936
- Opening date: March 12, 1940
- Operators: U.S. Army Corps of Engineers, St. Louis District

Dam and spillways
- Impounds: Upper Mississippi River
- Length: 1,340 feet (408.4 m)

Reservoir
- Creates: Pool 24
- Total capacity: 125,363 acre⋅ft (0.154633 km^{3})
- Catchment area: 140,900 mi^{2} (365,000 km^{2})
- Lock and Dam No. 24 Historic District
- U.S. National Register of Historic Places
- U.S. Historic district
- Location within Missouri Location within the United States
- Location: 350 N. First St., Clarksville, Missouri
- Area: 102.7 acres (41.6 ha)
- Built: 1940
- MPS: Upper Mississippi River 9-Foot Navigation Project MPS
- NRHP reference No.: 04000183
- Added to NRHP: March 10, 2004

Lock and Dam No. 24 is a lock and dam located near Clarksville, Missouri around river mile 273.4 on the Upper Mississippi River. The main lock is 110 feet (33.5 m) wide and 600 feet (182.9 m) long with its bottom at an elevation of 430 feet. The auxiliary lock is not operational. Normal pool elevation behind the dam is 449 feet. The movable portion of the dam is 1,340 feet (408.4 m) long and consists of 15 submersible, elliptical, tainter gates. A 2,720 feet (829.1 m) submersible earthen dike extends from the movable dam to the Illinois shore. In 2004, the facility was listed in the National Register of Historic Places as Lock and Dam No. 24 Historic District, #04000183 covering 1,027 acres (4.2 km^{2}), 3 buildings, 15 structures, 4 objects.

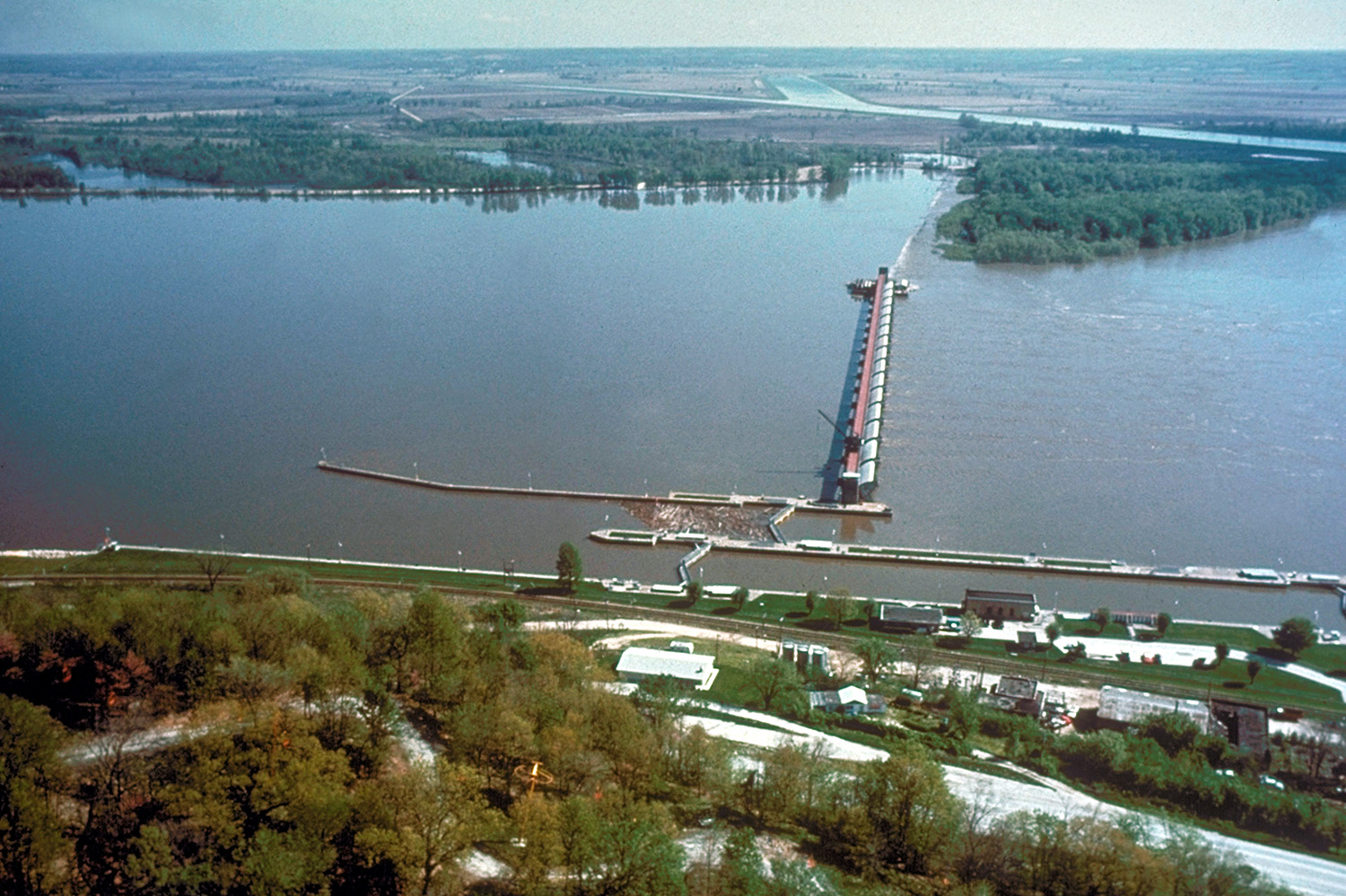
Lock and Dam No. 24 viewed from the Missouri side of the river, looking northeast toward Illinois

https://web.archive.org/web/20161226221158/http://www.mvr.usace.army.mil/Portals/48/docs/CC/FactSheets/MISS/UMR%20Locks%20%26%20Dams%20-%202016%20%28MVD%29.pdf

== See also ==
- List of locks and dams of the Upper Mississippi River
- Public Works Administration dams list
