= Kissenger, Missouri =

Unincorporated community in Missouri, United States

Coordinates: 39°18′18″N 90°51′30″W

Kissenger (also spelled Kissinger) is an unincorporated community in Pike County, in the U.S. state of Missouri.

== History ==
A post office called Kissenger was established in 1879, and remained in operation until 1919. The community has the name of James Henley Kissinger, the original owner of the town site.
