= McIntosh, Missouri =

Unincorporated community in Missouri, United States

Coordinates: 39°24′15″N 90°58′24″W

McIntosh is an unincorporated community in Pike County, in the U.S. state of Missouri.

The community has the name of William McIntosh, the original owner of the site.
