= Raymond Phillips Sanderson =

Artist, sculptor (1908–1987)

Raymond Phillips Sanderson (1908–1987) was an American artist and sculptor.

Sanderson was born in Bowling Green, Missouri and educated at the Art Institute of Chicago under Raoul Josset. He moved to Bisbee, Arizona for his health in 1932, where he worked as an illustrator and sign painter. His first major commission was the Miner's Monument at the Cochise County Courthouse in Bisbee, popularly known as the Copper Man, as well as some reliefs in the interior of the courthouse. He moved to Phoenix in 1937 to teach at the Phoenix Art Center under sponsorship by the Works Progress Administration. In 1939 he was commissioned by industrialist Rufus Riddlesbarger to outfit and decorate his new house at Riddlesbarger's Lanteen Ranch near Sierra Vista.

Sanderson received several significant commissions starting in 1940. Working for the United States Maritime Commission, Sanderson sculpted a series of wood relief panels for three ships, the President Jackson, President Monroe, and the President Hayes. He worked as an illustrator and model maker for the Goodyear Aircraft Corporation from 1942 to 1946. In 1946–47 he designed furniture, and from 1947 to 1954 he taught at Arizona State College. Other jobs included work as an illustrator for Motorola in 1957–58 and he was a model maker for the Arizona Highway Department in 1962–1965. Through the entire period he worked on commissioned projects and his own artwork. He received notice in 1973 with a retrospective exhibition at Arizona State University.

Sanderson's work is described as non-representational, modern, and derived from the landscape and culture of the American Southwest. Sanderson's 1951 Students Who Gave Their Lives is located on the University of Arizona campus to the south of the Student Union Memorial Center.

He moved to Chico, California in 1973, working in printmaking and painting after giving up sculpture over health concerns, having contracted coccidioidomycosis in 1958.
