= Curryville, Missouri =

- City
- Curryville City Hall

- Location of Curryville, Missouri
- Coordinates: 39°20′45″N 91°20′29″W
- Country: United States
- State: Missouri
- County: Pike

Area
  - Total: 0.27 sq mi (0.71 km^{2})
  - Land: 0.27 sq mi (0.71 km^{2})
  - Water: 0 sq mi (0.00 km^{2})
- Elevation: 827 ft (252 m)

Population (2020)
  - Total: 197
  - Density: 719/sq mi (277.5/km^{2})
- Time zone: UTC-6 (Central (CST))
  - Summer (DST): UTC-5 (CDT)
- ZIP code: 63339
- Area code: 573
- FIPS code: 29-17902
- GNIS feature ID: 2393699

Curryville is a city in western Pike County, Missouri, United States. As of the 2020 census, Curryville had a population of 197.

== History ==
Curryville was platted in 1866, and named after Perry A. Curry, the original owner of the town site. A post office called Curryville has been in operation since 1869.

== Geography ==
Curryville is located in western Pike County on U.S. Route 54 about seven miles west of Bowling Green. Vandalia in adjacent Audrain County lies approximately 7.5 miles to the southwest along Route 54.

According to the United States Census Bureau, the city has a total area of 0.27 square miles (0.70 km^{2}), all land.

== Demographics ==
Historical population
Census	Pop.	Note	%±
1880	273		—
1890	302		10.6%
1900	271		−10.3%
1910	238		−12.2%
1920	285		19.7%
1930	236		−17.2%
1940	266		12.7%
1950	258		−3.0%
1960	287		11.2%
1970	337		17.4%
1980	323		−4.2%
1990	261		−19.2%
2000	251		−3.8%
2010	225		−10.4%
2020	197		−12.4%
U.S. Decennial Census

=== 2010 census ===
As of the census of 2010, there were 225 people, 91 households, and 53 families living in the city. The population density was 833.3 inhabitants per square mile (321.7/km^{2}). There were 110 housing units at an average density of 407.4 per square mile (157.3/km^{2}). The racial makeup of the city was 91.1% White, 1.8% African American, 1.8% Native American, 0.4% Asian, and 4.9% from two or more races. Hispanic or Latino of any race were 1.8% of the population.

There were 91 households, of which 26.4% had children under the age of 18 living with them, 51.6% were married couples living together, 5.5% had a female householder with no husband present, 1.1% had a male householder with no wife present, and 41.8% were non-families. 36.3% of all households were made up of individuals, and 11% had someone living alone who was 65 years of age or older. The average household size was 2.47 and the average family size was 3.28.

The median age in the city was 42.3 years. 24% of residents were under the age of 18; 5.9% were between the ages of 18 and 24; 24.5% were from 25 to 44; 32.9% were from 45 to 64; and 12.9% were 65 years of age or older. The gender makeup of the city was 50.2% male and 49.8% female.

=== 2000 census ===
As of the census of 2000, there were 251 people, 106 households, and 71 families living in the city. The population density was 909.2 inhabitants per square mile (351.0/km^{2}). There were 128 housing units at an average density of 463.7 per square mile (179.0/km^{2}). The racial makeup of the city was 91.63% White, 3.98% African American, 0.40% Native American, 0.40% Asian, and 3.59% from two or more races.

There were 106 households, out of which 32.1% had children under the age of 18 living with them, 49.1% were married couples living together, 17.0% had a female householder with no husband present, and 32.1% were non-families. 28.3% of all households were made up of individuals, and 6.6% had someone living alone who was 65 years of age or older. The average household size was 2.37 and the average family size was 2.93.

In the city the population was spread out, with 26.7% under the age of 18, 8.0% from 18 to 24, 25.1% from 25 to 44, 29.5% from 45 to 64, and 10.8% who were 65 years of age or older. The median age was 35 years. For every 100 females there were 91.6 males. For every 100 females age 18 and over, there were 85.9 males.

The median income for a household in the city was $27,500, and the median income for a family was $29,583. Males had a median income of $27,679 versus $16,250 for females. The per capita income for the city was $13,032. About 17.1% of families and 22.7% of the population were below the poverty line, including 20.8% of those under the age of eighteen and 25.0% of those 65 or over.

== Transportation ==
While there is no fixed-route transit service in Curryville, intercity bus service is provided by Burlington Trailways in nearby Bowling Green.
