= Spencerburg, Missouri =

Unincorporated community in Missouri, United States

Coordinates: 39°25′18″N 91°23′16″W

Spencerburg is an unincorporated community in Pike County, in the U.S. state of Missouri.

== History ==
Spencerburg was platted in 1836, taking its name from nearby Spencer Creek. An old spelling was "Spencersburg". A post office called Spencersburg was established in 1837, and remained in operation until 1903.
