= Farmer, Missouri =

Unincorporated community in Missouri, United States

Coordinates: 39°15′26″N 91°18′34″W

Farmer is an unincorporated community in Pike County, in the U.S. state of Missouri.

== History ==
Farmer was platted in 1885, and taking its name from Moses Allen Farmer, an early settler. A post office called Farmer was established in 1883, and remained in operation until 1906.
