= Bryants Creek =

Stream in the American state of Missouri

Coordinates: 39°15′09″N 90°45′01″W

Bryants Creek is a stream in Pike and Lincoln counties of eastern Missouri. It is a tributary of the Mississippi River.

The stream headwaters are at and the confluence with the Mississippi is at .

Bryants Creek has the name of Rolla Bryant, the original owner the site.

== See also ==
- List of rivers of Missouri
