= Kinjockity Ranch =

Historic house in Arizona, United States

- U.S. National Register of Historic Places
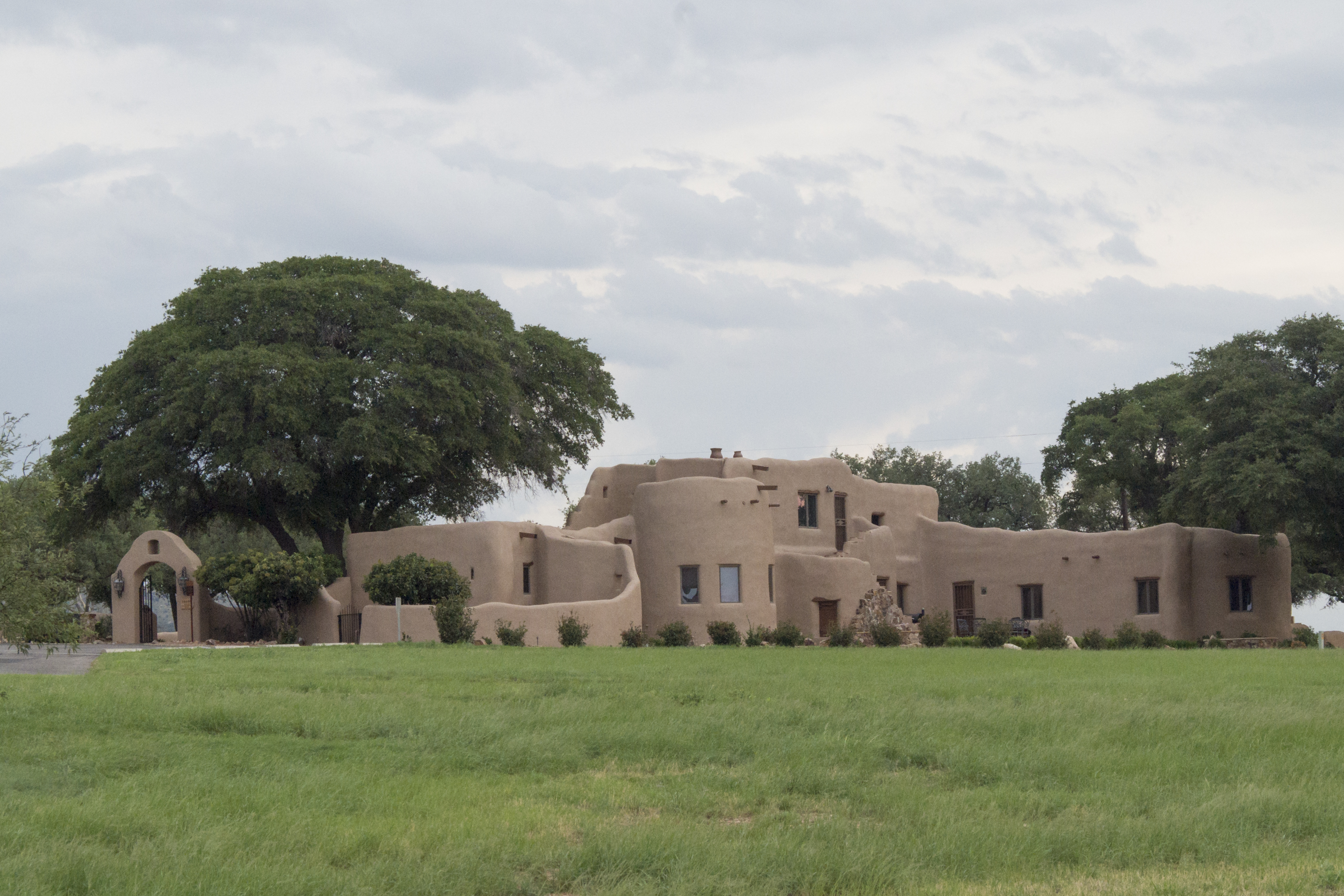
- The Kinjockity ranch house in 2014

- Location within Arizona Location within the United States
- Location: 10047 E. AZ 92, Hereford, Arizona
- Coordinates: 31°23′12″N 110°13′17″W
- Area: 8 acres (3.2 ha)
- Built: 1939
- Architect: Morgan, Edward C.; Sanderson, Raymond Phillips
- Architectural style: Pueblo
- NRHP reference No.: 96000759
- Added to NRHP: July 19, 1996

Kinjockity Ranch, also known as Lanteen Ranch, is a Pueblo Revival style residence in Cochise County, Arizona, originally built in 1939-1940 for Rufus Riddlesbarger, a wealthy Chicago businessman. It is a notable example of Pueblo Revival style, executed in adobe with richly detailed interiors and hand-made hardware. The house was designed by Edward C. Morgan, an architect from Phoenix who specialized in what he called "the Mexican style." The interiors were decorated and embellished by illustrator and sculptor Raymond Phillips Sanderson, who had collaborated with Morgan on previous commissions.

== Description ==
The ranch is about 15 miles (24 km) southeast of Sierra Vista, Arizona, and originally comprised 618 acres (250 ha). Its primary structures are the main house, the guest house, and the foreman's house. The main and guest houses have a marked "handmade" appearance, while the foreman's house is of the same style, but with less attention to detail. Several outbuildings complete the ensemble. Additional structures, not included in the National Register boundaries, included an adobe entrance arch on the driveway, barn, an adobe-walled corral, a four-hole irrigated golf course, and a pump house. An airstrip, located about 2.5 miles (4.0 km) to the southeast, featured a hangar and another corral. The land is generally level grassland with occasional trees and a view of the Huachuca Mountains.

The main house is a rambling, mostly one-story structure with the main public rooms laid out in line, starting at the south end with service areas, the kitchen and the pantry. The dining room adjoins the kitchen, with a projecting round breakfast room on the east side, then an entry room with a fireplace and a living room with a fireplace. An office is located above the entry room, reached by an exterior stairway. A bedroom wing is appended to the north side of the living room, extending to the east with a guest bedroom and master bedroom and attendant bathrooms and closets, both with rounded projecting bays. The guest house features a "kiva room," circular in shape and resembling a Native American kiva, then an entry, a living room, a small kitchen and a bedroom and bath. The foreman's house is roughly square in arrangement, with living room, dining room, kitchen and three bedrooms, and porches on three sides. Exterior walls are rounded adobe with irregular parapets and projecting vigas.

Sanderson's artwork features motifs borrowed from Native American themes, with the strongest resemblance to Navajo art. Sanderson executed painted wall decorations, carved doors, tiles, light fixtures and door and cabinet hardware. The adapted style has been described as "pueblo Deco."

== History ==
Rufus Riddlesbarger was a former airmail pilot who invented a contraceptive diaphragm device in the 1930s. His company, Lanteen Laboratories, was a success and Riddlesbarger acquired the land for his ranch in 1937 with some of the proceeds. Riddlesbarger had intended to make the Lanteen Ranch his primary home, but sold the property in 1947 to Margaret W. Herschede of Cincinnati, Ohio. Riddlesbarger moved to Tucson, where he ran into trouble in 1948 over a relationship with an underage house servant, eventually leaving the United States. Herschede and her husband used the ranch as a working cattle ranch and lived on the site. The ranch was sold in 1972, following the deaths of the Herschedes, for subdivision and development. Some lots were sold, but the houses were eventually sold without land to another company in 1985. In 1990 Evans and Olga Guidroz bought the buildings and 298 acres (121 ha) of land and resumed ranching. The ranch is presently known as Kinjockity Ranch.

Kinjockity Ranch was listed on the National Register of Historic Places on July 19, 1996.
