= Stark, Missouri =

Unincorporated community in Missouri, United States

Coordinates: 39°22′21″N 91°01′29″W

Stark is an unincorporated community in Pike County, in the U.S. state of Missouri.

== History ==
A post office called Stark was established in 1888, and remained in operation until 1907. The community has the name of Thomas Thornton Stark, the original owner of the town site.
