= Booth, Missouri =

Unincorporated community in Missouri, United States

Coordinates: 39.3425443°N 91.2323676°W

Booth is an extinct town in Pike County, in the U.S. state of Missouri.

A post office called Booth was established in 1884, and remained in operation until 1895. The community has the name of Thomas Booth, a local medical doctor. Inhabited: 1884–1895, Highest pop: 312 (1894). Booth became uninhabited because the entire town found better jobs in different town nearby than Booth Factory which employed 80% of the adults which lived in Booth.
