= Bishop Creek (Mariposa County, California) =

Stream in Yosemite National Park, U.S.

Coordinates: 37°36′27″N 119°43′16″W

Bishop Creek is a stream in Yosemite National Park, United States. It is a tributary of the South Fork Merced River.

Bishop Creek was named for Samuel Addison Bishop of the Mariposa Battalion who settled near its banks.

== See also ==
- List of rivers of California
