= Sledd, Missouri =

Unincorporated community in Missouri, United States

Coordinates: 39°13′53″N 90°53′26″W

Sledd is an unincorporated community in southeast Pike County, in the U.S. state of Missouri.

The community is on Missouri Route W two miles south of Paynesville and approximately one-half mile north of the Pike-Lincoln county line. Guinns Creek flows past the north side of the community.

== History ==
A post office called Sledd was established in 1891, and remained in operation until 1901. Alexander Sledd, an early postmaster, gave the community his last name.
