= Bishop Creek (Forest Creek tributary) =

- Location within Oregon Location within the United States

Physical characteristics
- Source
  - coordinates: 42.2304035°N 122.9739298°W
- Mouth
  - coordinates: 42.2498467°N 123.0294875°W

Bishop Creek is a stream in the U.S. state of Oregon. It is a tributary of Forest Creek.

Bishop Creek was named after James Bishop, a pioneer settler.
