= Clarksville, Missouri =

City in Pike County, Missouri, United States

- City
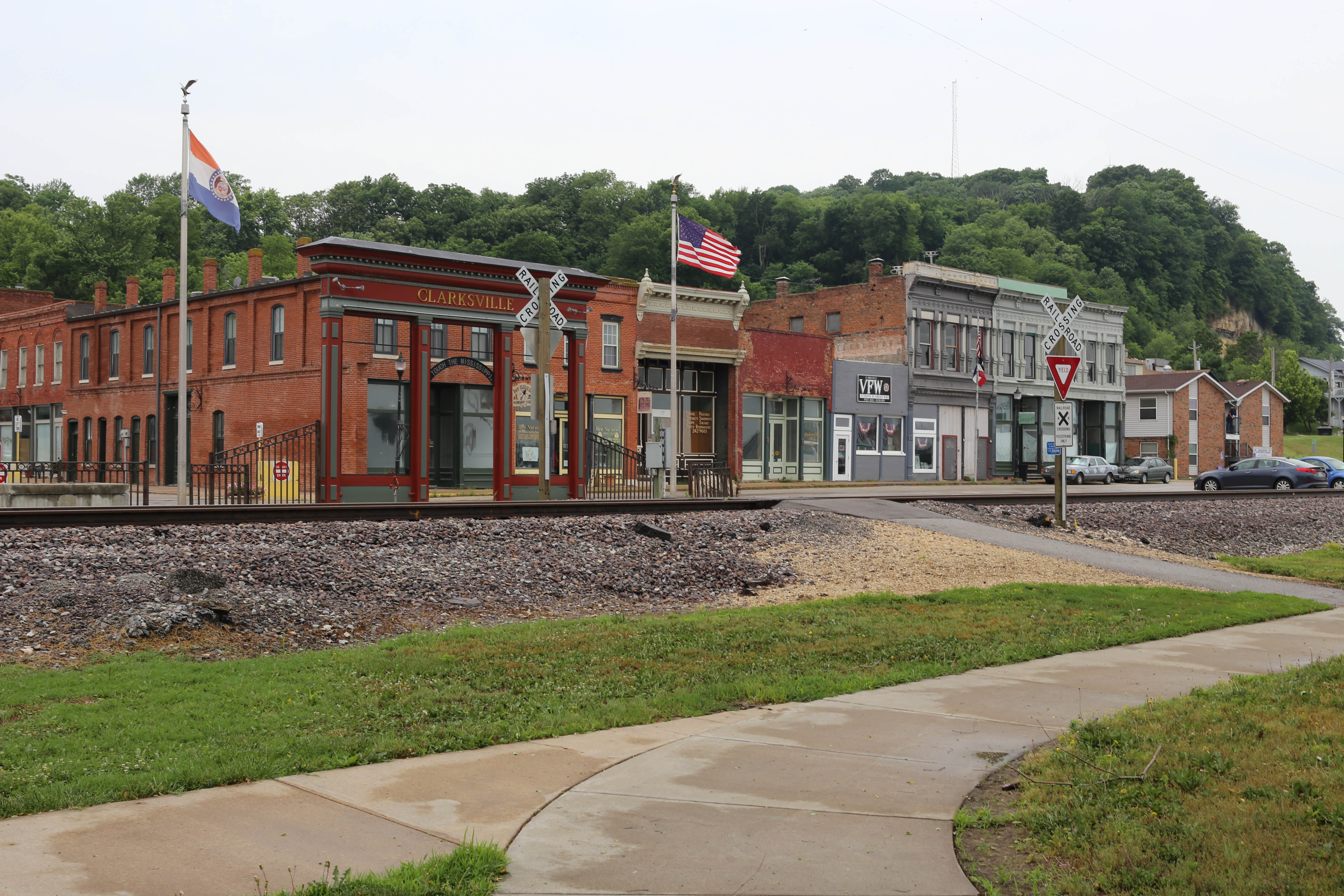
- Clarksville, Missouri in June 2018

- Location of Clarksville, Missouri
- Coordinates: 39°22′10″N 90°54′17″W
- Country: United States
- State: Missouri
- County: Pike

Area
  - Total: 0.94 sq mi (2.44 km^{2})
  - Land: 0.58 sq mi (1.51 km^{2})
  - Water: 0.36 sq mi (0.93 km^{2})
- Elevation: 466 ft (142 m)

Population (2020)
  - Total: 372
  - Density: 640.0/sq mi (247.12/km^{2})
- Time zone: UTC-6 (Central (CST))
  - Summer (DST): UTC-5 (CDT)
- ZIP code: 63336
- Area code: 573
- FIPS code: 29-14194
- GNIS feature ID: 2393545
- Website: clarksville-mo.gov

Clarksville is a city in Calumet Township, Pike County, Missouri, United States. The population was 372 at the 2020 census.

== History ==
Clarksville was platted in 1819. The city was named for William Clark, governor of the territory at that time.

The Clarksville Historic District, Clifford-Wyrick House, Lock and Dam No. 24 Historic District, Northern Methodist Episcopal Church of Clarksville, and Turner-Pharr House are listed on the National Register of Historic Places.

Clarksville celebrated its bicentennial in 2017.

== Demographics ==
Historical population
Census	Pop.	Note	%±
1850	300		—
1860	573		91.0%
1870	1,152		101.0%
1880	1,493		29.6%
1890	1,186		−20.6%
1900	843		−28.9%
1910	918		8.9%
1920	729		−20.6%
1930	739		1.4%
1940	879		18.9%
1950	702		−20.1%
1960	638		−9.1%
1970	668		4.7%
1980	585		−12.4%
1990	480		−17.9%
2000	490		2.1%
2010	442		−9.8%
2020	372		−15.8%
U.S. Decennial Census

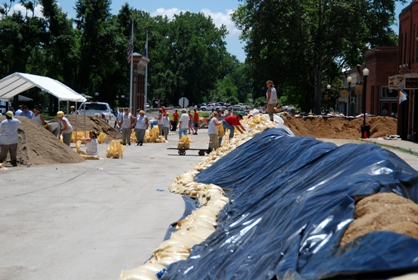
Sandbagging of low-lying areas on the Mississippi River, June 2008

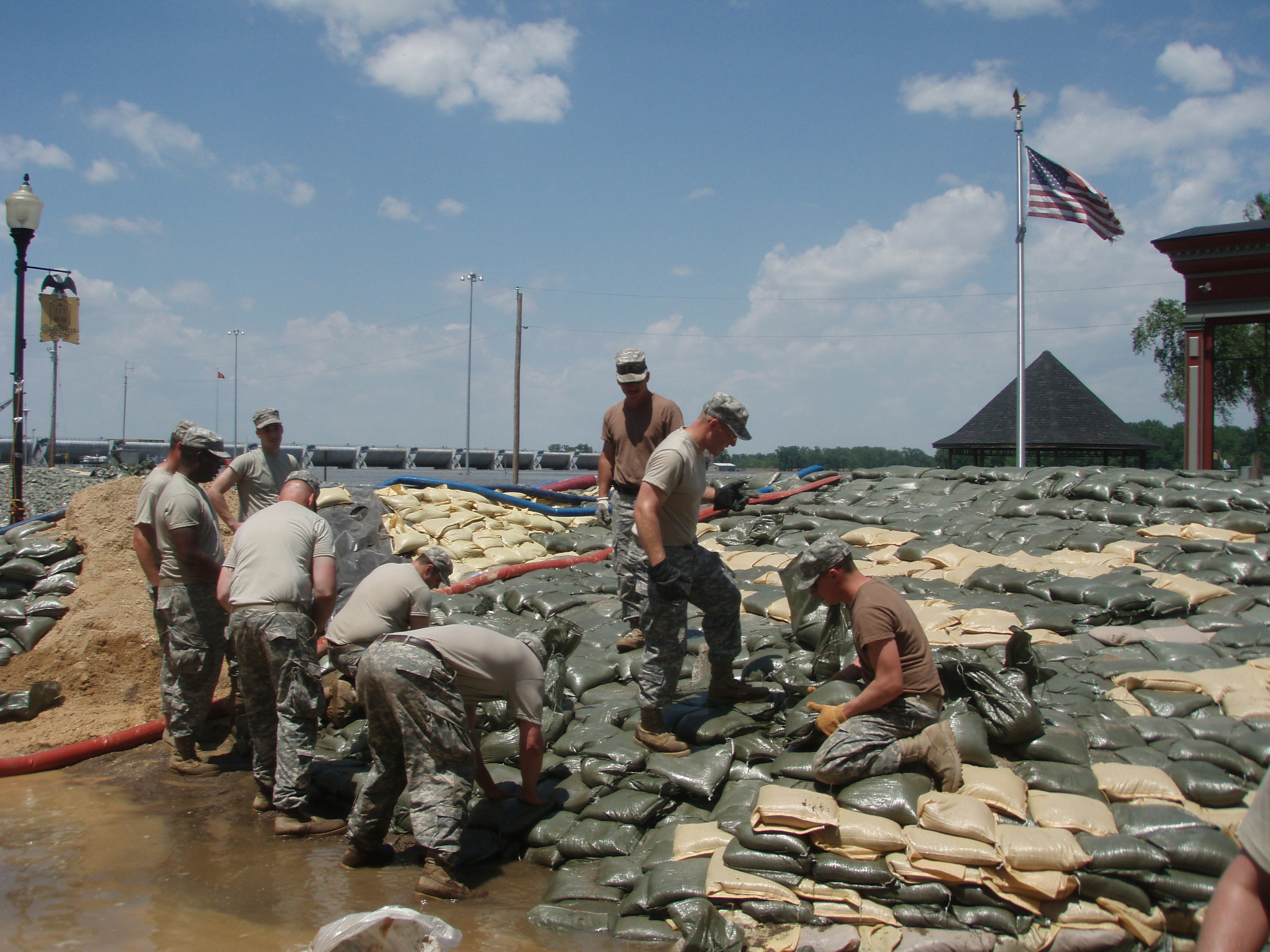
Soldiers of the Missouri Army National Guard sandbag the Mississippi River, June 2008.

=== 2010 census ===
As of the census of 2010, there were 442 people, 210 households, and 109 families residing in the city. The population density was 960.9 inhabitants per square mile (371.0/km^{2}). There were 271 housing units at an average density of 589.1 per square mile (227.5/km^{2}). The racial makeup of the city was 89.4% White, 7.2% African American, 2.0% from other races, and 1.4% from two or more races. Hispanic or Latino of any race were 2.9% of the population.

There were 210 households, of which 23.8% had children under the age of 18 living with them, 36.7% were married couples living together, 8.6% had a female householder with no husband present, 6.7% had a male householder with no wife present, and 48.1% were non-families. 40.0% of all households were made up of individuals, and 18.5% had someone living alone who was 65 years of age or older. The average household size was 2.10 and the average family size was 2.83.

The median age in the city was 45.8 years. 21.5% of residents were under the age of 18; 9.8% were between the ages of 18 and 24; 17.7% were from 25 to 44; 30% were from 45 to 64; and 21% were 65 years of age or older. The gender makeup of the city was 51.8% male and 48.2% female.

=== 2000 census ===
As of the census of 2000, there were 490 people, 225 households, and 134 families residing in the city. The population density was 1,060.2 inhabitants per square mile (409.3/km^{2}). There were 278 housing units at an average density of 601.5 per square mile (232.2/km^{2}). The racial makeup of the city was 88.57% White, 7.14% African American, 0.20% Asian, 0.20% Pacific Islander, 1.43% from other races, and 2.45% from two or more races. Hispanic or Latino of any race were 3.06% of the population.

There were 225 households, out of which 28.0% had children under the age of 18 living with them, 41.3% were married couples living together, 13.8% had a female householder with no husband present, and 40.4% were non-families. 35.6% of all households were made up of individuals, and 15.6% had someone living alone who was 65 years of age or older. The average household size was 2.18 and the average family size was 2.78.

In the city the population was spread out, with 25.3% under the age of 18, 8.0% from 18 to 24, 28.0% from 25 to 44, 20.4% from 45 to 64, and 18.4% who were 65 years of age or older. The median age was 36 years. For every 100 females, there were 86.3 males. For every 100 females age 18 and over, there were 83.9 males.

The median income for a household in the city was $23,611, and the median income for a family was $29,375. Males had a median income of $29,375 versus $17,292 for females. The per capita income for the city was $14,728. About 22.3% of families and 22.2% of the population were below the poverty line, including 32.2% of those under age 18 and 11.4% of those age 65 or over.

== Geography ==
Clarksville is located adjacent to the Mississippi River and is on State Route 79 about nine miles southeast of Louisiana, Missouri. Clarksville Island is in the Mississippi east of the Missouri-Illinois state line.

According to the United States Census Bureau, the city has a total area of 0.82 square miles (2.12 km^{2}), of which 0.46 square miles (1.19 km^{2}) is land and 0.36 square miles (0.93 km^{2}) is water.

Climate data for Clarksville, Missouri (Lock and Dam No. 24) (1991–2020 normals, extremes 1992–present)
Month	Jan	Feb	Mar	Apr	May	Jun	Jul	Aug	Sep	Oct	Nov	Dec	Year
Record high °F (°C)	73 (23)	81 (27)	91 (33)	91 (33)	99 (37)	105 (41)	112 (44)	104 (40)	102 (39)	94 (34)	84 (29)	74 (23)	112 (44)
Mean daily maximum °F (°C)	36.5 (2.5)	41.4 (5.2)	52.3 (11.3)	65.0 (18.3)	74.4 (23.6)	83.5 (28.6)	87.3 (30.7)	85.8 (29.9)	79.3 (26.3)	67.1 (19.5)	53.0 (11.7)	41.1 (5.1)	63.9 (17.7)
Daily mean °F (°C)	28.1 (−2.2)	32.4 (0.2)	42.7 (5.9)	54.4 (12.4)	64.4 (18.0)	73.9 (23.3)	77.9 (25.5)	76.2 (24.6)	68.8 (20.4)	56.7 (13.7)	43.8 (6.6)	33.1 (0.6)	54.4 (12.4)
Mean daily minimum °F (°C)	19.7 (−6.8)	23.5 (−4.7)	33.0 (0.6)	43.8 (6.6)	54.4 (12.4)	64.2 (17.9)	68.4 (20.2)	66.7 (19.3)	58.2 (14.6)	46.3 (7.9)	34.6 (1.4)	25.1 (−3.8)	44.8 (7.1)
Record low °F (°C)	−20 (−29)	−15 (−26)	−3 (−19)	22 (−6)	29 (−2)	42 (6)	43 (6)	44 (7)	34 (1)	25 (−4)	6 (−14)	−3 (−19)	−20 (−29)
Average precipitation inches (mm)	2.05 (52)	1.73 (44)	3.01 (76)	4.02 (102)	4.60 (117)	4.44 (113)	3.91 (99)	3.53 (90)	3.21 (82)	2.91 (74)	3.00 (76)	2.06 (52)	38.47 (977)
Average snowfall inches (cm)	4.5 (11)	3.2 (8.1)	1.4 (3.6)	0.1 (0.25)	0.0 (0.0)	0.0 (0.0)	0.0 (0.0)	0.0 (0.0)	0.0 (0.0)	0.0 (0.0)	0.1 (0.25)	2.3 (5.8)	11.6 (29)
Average precipitation days (≥ 0.01 in)	8.0	7.8	10.4	11.2	12.4	10.7	8.6	7.7	7.2	9.1	8.6	8.9	110.6
Average snowy days (≥ 0.1 in)	3.1	1.7	0.6	0.1	0.0	0.0	0.0	0.0	0.0	0.0	0.3	1.7	7.5
Source: NOAA

== Education ==
Pike County R-III School District operates two schools at Clarksville: Clopton Elementary School and Clopton High School.

The town has a lending library, the Clarksville Public Library.

== Tourism ==
Clarksville has an Eagle Days weekend when eagle watching, bird education, and other activities take place. The event is sponsored by the Missouri Department of Conservation, the city of Clarksville and the U.S. Army Corps of Engineers.

A skylift was a popular tourist attraction from the early 1960s to the early 1990s. The lookout point, offering a view of 800 square miles, is the highest on the Mississippi River. There were plans to reopen it in the early 2000s, but the project has faced challenge from the Sac and Fox Nation of Oklahoma as the skylift is on an ancient Native American burial mound.

== See also ==
- List of cities in Missouri
