= Jim Hansen (Missouri politician) =

American politician

Member of the Missouri House of Representatives from the 40th district
- In office January 7, 2013 – January 6, 2021
- Succeeded by: Chad Perkins

Personal details
- Born: January 24, 1947 (age 79) Hannibal, Missouri
- Party: Republican
- Spouse: Cindy
- Children: three
- Education: University of Arizona
- Profession: insurance executive

Jim Hansen (born January 24, 1947) is an American politician. He is former a member of the Missouri House of Representatives, having served from 2013–2021. He is a member of the Republican party.

== Electoral history ==
=== State representative ===
Missouri House of Representatives Primary Election, August 7, 2012, District 40
Party	Candidate	Votes	%	±%
Republican	Jim Hansen	2,478	100.00%	

Missouri House of Representatives Election, November 6, 2012, District 40
Party	Candidate	Votes	%	±%
Republican	Jim Hansen	7,999	51.89%	+51.89
Democratic	Paul Quinn	7,417	48.11%	−51.89

Missouri House of Representatives Election, November 4, 2014, District 40
Party	Candidate	Votes	%	±%
Republican	Jim Hansen	6,647	73.28%	+21.39
Democratic	Lowell Jackson	2,424	26.72%	−21.39

Missouri House of Representatives Election, November 8, 2016, District 40
Party	Candidate	Votes	%	±%
Republican	Jim Hansen	13,623	100.00%	+26.72

Missouri House of Representatives Election, November 6, 2018, District 40
Party	Candidate	Votes	%	±%
Republican	Jim Hansen	11,492	100.00%	
