= Annada, Missouri =

Annada
- Village
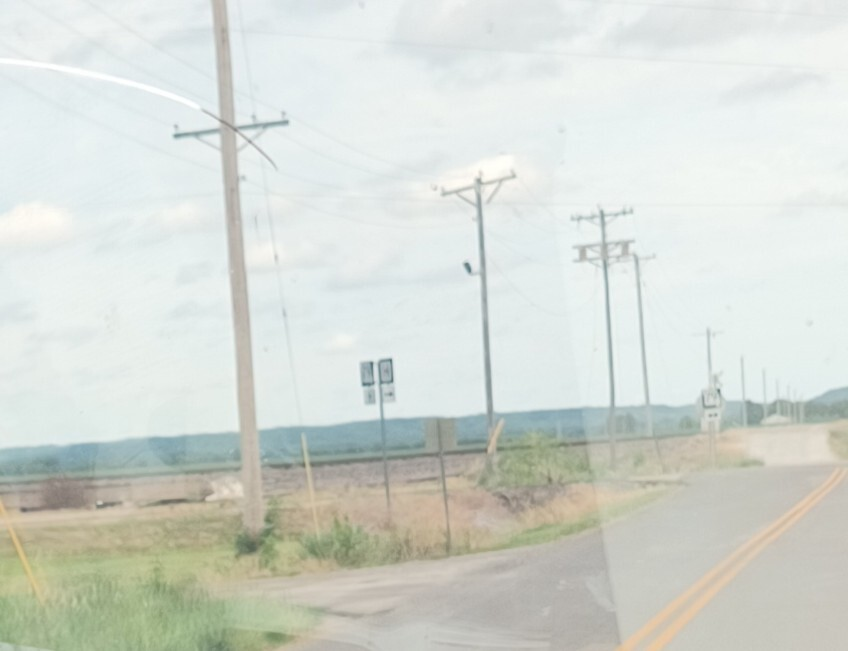
- Annada in 2026

- Location of Annada, Missouri
- Coordinates: 39°15′44″N 90°49′43″W
- Country: United States
- State: Missouri
- County: Pike
- Incorporated: 1912

Area
  - Total: 0.062 sq mi (0.16 km^{2})
  - Land: 0.062 sq mi (0.16 km^{2})
  - Water: 0 sq mi (0.00 km^{2})
- Elevation: 449 ft (137 m)

Population (2020)
  - Total: 14
  - Density: 229.9/sq mi (88.78/km^{2})
- Time zone: UTC-6 (Central (CST))
  - Summer (DST): UTC-5 (CDT)
- ZIP code: 63330
- Area code: 573
- FIPS code: 29-01252
- GNIS feature ID: 2397964

Annada is a village in Pike County, Missouri, United States. As of the 2020 census, Annada had a population of 14.

== History ==
A post office called Annada has been in operation since 1880. The community's name is an amalgamation of the first names of Ann and Ada Jamison, the daughters of a pioneer citizen.

== Geography ==
According to the United States Census Bureau, the village has a total area of 0.06 square miles (0.16 km^{2}), all land.

== Demographics ==
Historical population
Census	Pop.	Note	%±
1930	72		—
1940	110		52.8%
1950	93		−15.5%
1960	105		12.9%
1970	109		3.8%
1980	70		−35.8%
1990	70		0.0%
2000	48		−31.4%
2010	29		−39.6%
2020	14		−51.7%
U.S. Decennial Census

=== 2010 census ===
As of the census of 2010, there were 29 people, 16 households, and 7 families living in the village. The population density was 483.3 inhabitants per square mile (186.6/km^{2}). There were 27 housing units at an average density of 450.0 per square mile (173.7/km^{2}). The racial makeup of the village was 96.6% White and 3.4% African American.

There were 16 households, of which 12.5% had children under the age of 18 living with them, 31.3% were married couples living together, 12.5% had a female householder with no husband present, and 56.3% were non-families. 56.3% of all households were made up of individuals, and 12.5% had someone living alone who was 65 years of age or older. The average household size was 1.81 and the average family size was 2.71.

The median age in the village was 45.5 years. 10.3% of residents were under the age of 18; 10.3% were between the ages of 18 and 24; 27.5% were from 25 to 44; 41.2% were from 45 to 64; and 10.3% were 65 years of age or older. The gender makeup of the village was 69.0% male and 31.0% female.

=== 2000 census ===
As of the census of 2000, there were 48 people, 22 households, and 8 families living in the village. The population density was 790.5 inhabitants per square mile (305.2/km^{2}). There were 25 housing units at an average density of 411.7 per square mile (159.0/km^{2}). The racial makeup of the village was 97.92% White, and 2.08% from two or more races.

There were 22 households, out of which 22.7% had children under the age of 18 living with them, 36.4% were married couples living together, and 59.1% were non-families. 54.5% of all households were made up of individuals, and 27.3% had someone living alone who was 65 years of age or older. The average household size was 2.18 and the average family size was 3.67.

In the village, the population was spread out, with 27.1% under the age of 18, 4.2% from 18 to 24, 29.2% from 25 to 44, 20.8% from 45 to 64, and 18.8% who were 65 years of age or older. The median age was 40 years. For every 100 females, there were 182.4 males. For every 100 age 18 and over, there were 218.2 males.

The median income for a household in the village was $25,500, and the median income for a family was $28,333. Males had a median income of $26,250 versus $0 for females. The per capita income for the village was $15,423. There were no families and 15.4% of the population living below the poverty line, including no under eighteens and 50.0% of those over 64.
