= Edgewood, Missouri =

Unincorporated community in Missouri, United States

Coordinates: 39°16′18″N 91°04′29″W

Edgewood is an unincorporated community in southeast Pike County, in the U.S. state of Missouri. The community lies on Missouri Route WW one half mile east of US Route 61. Eolia is approximately 4.5 miles to the southeast along Route 61.

== History ==
A post office called Edgewood was established in 1879, and remained in operation until 1955. The community was so named for the fact the original town site was situated at the edge of a large forest.
