= Noix Creek =

Stream in the American state of Missouri

Coordinates: 39°26′41″N 91°02′22″W

Noix Creek is a stream in Pike County in the U.S. state of Missouri. It is a tributary of the Mississippi River which it enters on the southeast side of the city of Louisiana.

Noix Creek was so named on account of nut-bearing trees along its course, the name noix meaning "nut" in French.

== See also ==
- List of rivers of Missouri
