= Frankford, Missouri =

- City
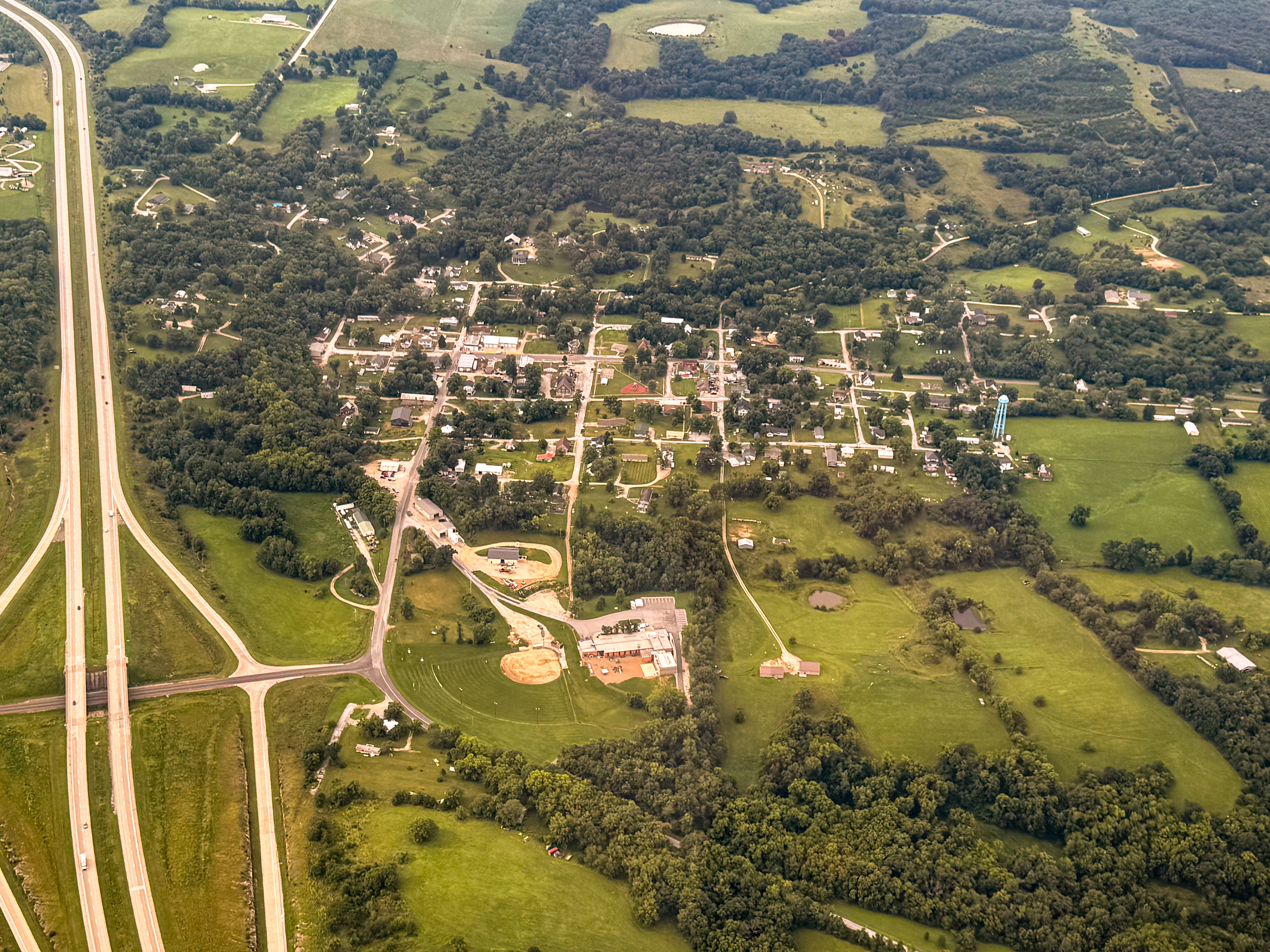

- Location of Frankford, Missouri
- Coordinates: 39°29′34″N 91°19′13″W
- Country: United States
- State: Missouri
- County: Pike
- Incorporated: 1889

Area
  - Total: 0.43 sq mi (1.11 km^{2})
  - Land: 0.43 sq mi (1.11 km^{2})
  - Water: 0 sq mi (0.00 km^{2})
- Elevation: 577 ft (176 m)

Population (2020)
  - Total: 343
  - Density: 801.4/sq mi (309.41/km^{2})
- Time zone: UTC-6 (Central (CST))
  - Summer (DST): UTC-5 (CDT)
- ZIP code: 63441
- Area code: 573
- FIPS code: 29-25552
- GNIS feature ID: 2394804

Frankford is a city in Pike County, Missouri, United States. As of the 2020 census, Frankford had a population of 343.

== History ==
A post office called Frankford has been in operation since 1830. The community's name probably is a transfer from Frankfort, Kentucky, the former home of a first settler.

== Geography ==
Frankford is located at 39°29′36″N 91°19′15″W (39.493255, -91.320831).

According to the United States Census Bureau, the city has a total area of 0.52 square miles (1.35 km^{2}), all land.

== Demographics ==
Historical population
Census	Pop.	Note	%±
1880	462		—
1890	662		43.3%
1900	700		5.7%
1910	793		13.3%
1920	653		−17.7%
1930	546		−16.4%
1940	471		−13.7%
1950	449		−4.7%
1960	474		5.6%
1970	472		−0.4%
1980	443		−6.1%
1990	396		−10.6%
2000	351		−11.4%
2010	323		−8.0%
2020	343		6.2%
U.S. Decennial Census

=== 2010 census ===
As of the census of 2010, there were 323 people, 142 households, and 91 families living in the city. The population density was 621.2 inhabitants per square mile (239.8/km^{2}). There were 171 housing units at an average density of 328.8 per square mile (127.0/km^{2}). The racial makeup of the city was 95.0% White, 1.9% African American, 0.6% Native American, 0.3% from other races, and 2.2% from two or more races. Hispanic or Latino of any race were 0.9% of the population.

There were 142 households, of which 29.6% had children under the age of 18 living with them, 46.5% were married couples living together, 9.9% had a female householder with no husband present, 7.7% had a male householder with no wife present, and 35.9% were non-families. 29.6% of all households were made up of individuals, and 15.5% had someone living alone who was 65 years of age or older. The average household size was 2.27 and the average family size was 2.80.

The median age in the city was 40.1 years. 22% of residents were under the age of 18; 7.1% were between the ages of 18 and 24; 26% were from 25 to 44; 29.5% were from 45 to 64; and 15.5% were 65 years of age or older. The gender makeup of the city was 54.5% male and 45.5% female.

=== 2000 census ===
As of the census of 2000, there were 351 people, 148 households, and 96 families living in the city. The population density was 745.2 inhabitants per square mile (287.7/km^{2}). There were 179 housing units at an average density of 380.0 per square mile (146.7/km^{2}). The racial makeup of the city was 96.30% White, 3.13% African American, and 0.57% from two or more races.

There were 148 households, out of which 27.0% had children under the age of 18 living with them, 49.3% were married couples living together, 10.1% had a female householder with no husband present, and 35.1% were non-families. 31.8% of all households were made up of individuals, and 17.6% had someone living alone who was 65 years of age or older. The average household size was 2.37 and the average family size was 3.01.

In the city the population was spread out, with 23.6% under the age of 18, 10.3% from 18 to 24, 26.8% from 25 to 44, 25.1% from 45 to 64, and 14.2% who were 65 years of age or older. The median age was 39 years. For every 100 females there were 100.6 males. For every 100 females age 18 and over, there were 95.6 males.

The median income for a household in the city was $26,406, and the median income for a family was $40,156. Males had a median income of $30,750 versus $20,625 for females. The per capita income for the city was $14,892. About 11.1% of families and 13.1% of the population were below the poverty line, including 10.7% of those under age 18 and 41.9% of those age 65 or over.
