= Missouri Route 161 =

State highway in Missouri, U.S.

Route 161
- MO 161 highlighted in red

Route information
- Maintained by MoDOT
- Length: 42.299 mi (68.074 km)

Major junctions
- South end: I-70 / US 40 / Route J southwest of Danville
- Route 19 in Montgomery
- North end: US 61 / US 61 Bus. at Bowling Green

Location
- Country: United States
- State: Missouri
- Counties: Montgomery, Pike

Highway system
- Missouri State Highway System; Interstate; US; State; Supplemental
← US 160	→ Route 162

Route 161 is a state highway in Montgomery and Pike counties in Missouri, United States. Its northern terminus is at Business U.S. Route 61 in Bowling Green; its southern terminus is at Interstate 70/U.S. Route 40 south of Montgomery City.

== History ==
Missouri Route 161 was formerly known as Route 29.

== Major intersections ==
County	Location	mi	km	Destinations	Notes
Montgomery		0.000	0.000	Route J	Continuation south beyond southern terminus
Montgomery		0.000– 0.115	0.000– 0.185	I-70 / US 40	Southern terminus; diamond interchange; I-70 exit 170
Montgomery	Montgomery City	6.044	9.727	Route 19 south (Sturgeon Street)	Southern end of Route 19 concurrency
Montgomery	Montgomery City	6.119	9.848	Route 19 north (Sturgeon Street)	Northern end of Route 19 concurrency
Pike	Bowling Green	41.200	66.305	US 61 Bus. north	Roundabout; southern end of US 61 Bus. concurrency
Pike	Bowling Green	42.092– 42.299	67.741– 68.074	US 61 (Avenue of the Saints) / US 61 Bus. ends	Diamond interchange; northern end of US 61 Bus. concurrency
Pike	Bowling Green	42.299	68.074	Outer 61	Northern terminus; T intersection
1.000 mi = 1.609 km; 1.000 km = 0.621 mi: Concurrency terminus

== See also ==
- List of state highways in Missouri
