= Bowling Green, Missouri =

City in Missouri, U.S.

- City
- City of Bowling Green
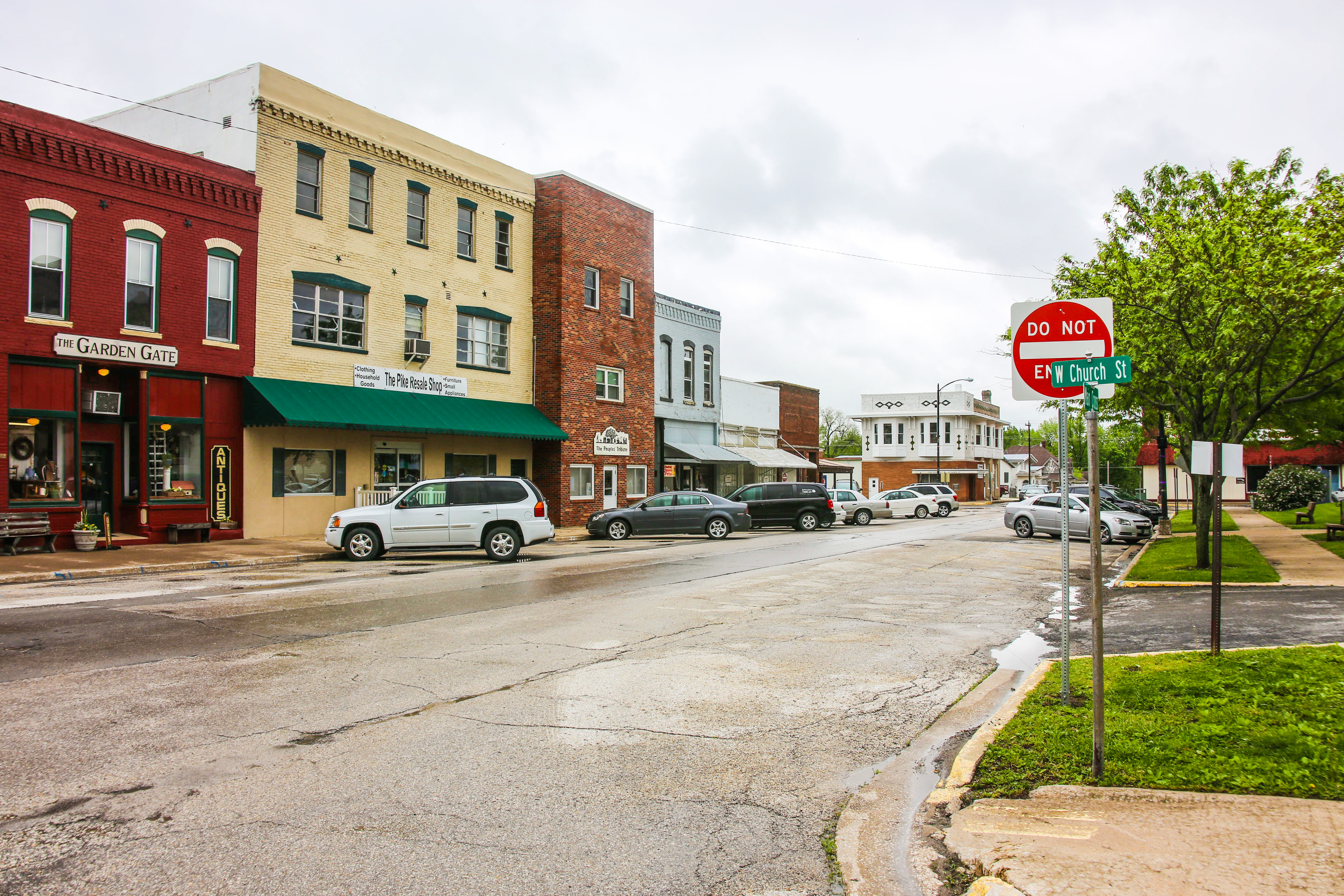
- Bowling Green, Missouri in 2015

- Location of Bowling Green, Missouri
- Coordinates: 39°20′41″N 92°12′11″W
- Country: United States
- State: Missouri
- County: Pike

Area
  - Total: 2.70 sq mi (7.00 km^{2})
  - Land: 2.69 sq mi (6.97 km^{2})
  - Water: 0.015 sq mi (0.04 km^{2})
- Elevation: 892 ft (272 m)

Population (2020)
  - Total: 4,195
  - Density: 1,559.9/sq mi (602.28/km^{2})
- Time zone: UTC-6 (Central (CST))
  - Summer (DST): UTC-5 (CDT)
- ZIP code: 63334
- Area code: 573
- FIPS code: 29-07660
- GNIS feature ID: 2394228
- Website: https://www.bowlinggreen-mo.gov/

Bowling Green is a city and the county seat of Pike County, Missouri, United States. As of the 2020 census, Bowling Green had a population of 4,195.

== History ==
Bowling Green was settled in 1819, and designated county seat in 1824. Settled chiefly by migrants from Kentucky and Virginia, it was named after Bowling Green, Kentucky.

The James Beauchamp Clark House was listed on the National Register of Historic Places in 1976.

== Demographics ==
Historical population
| Census | Pop. | Note | %± |
|---|---|---|---|
| 1850 | 319 | | — |
| 1860 | 379 | | 18.8% |
| 1870 | 599 | | 58.0% |
| 1880 | 1,067 | | 78.1% |
| 1890 | 1,564 | | 46.6% |
| 1900 | 1,902 | | 21.6% |
| 1910 | 1,585 | | −16.7% |
| 1920 | 1,965 | | 24.0% |
| 1930 | 1,855 | | −5.6% |
| 1940 | 1,975 | | 6.5% |
| 1950 | 2,396 | | 21.3% |
| 1960 | 2,650 | | 10.6% |
| 1970 | 2,936 | | 10.8% |
| 1980 | 3,022 | | 2.9% |
| 1990 | 2,976 | | −1.5% |
| 2000 | 3,260 | | 9.5% |
| 2010 | 5,334 | | 63.6% |
| 2020 | 4,195 | | −21.4% |
U.S. Decennial Census

=== 2020 census ===
As of the 2020 census, Bowling Green had a population of 4,195. The median age was 36.9 years. 21.5% of residents were under the age of 18 and 14.5% of residents were 65 years of age or older. For every 100 females there were 132.5 males, and for every 100 females age 18 and over there were 138.8 males age 18 and over.

0.0% of residents lived in urban areas, while 100.0% lived in rural areas.

There were 1,375 households in Bowling Green, of which 33.5% had children under the age of 18 living in them. Of all households, 36.5% were married-couple households, 19.0% were households with a male householder and no spouse or partner present, and 35.4% were households with a female householder and no spouse or partner present. About 35.3% of all households were made up of individuals and 15.8% had someone living alone who was 65 years of age or older.

There were 1,537 housing units, of which 10.5% were vacant. The homeowner vacancy rate was 3.2% and the rental vacancy rate was 7.8%.

Racial composition as of the 2020 census
| Race | Number | Percent |
|---|---|---|
| White | 3,468 | 82.7% |
| Black or African American | 461 | 11.0% |
| American Indian and Alaska Native | 4 | 0.1% |
| Asian | 8 | 0.2% |
| Native Hawaiian and Other Pacific Islander | 1 | 0.0% |
| Some other race | 21 | 0.5% |
| Two or more races | 232 | 5.5% |
| Hispanic or Latino (of any race) | 107 | 2.6% |

=== 2010 census ===
As of the census of 2010, there were 5,334 people, 1,316 households, and 810 families living in the city. The population density was 1,982.9 inhabitants per square mile (765.6/km^{2}). There were 1,474 housing units at an average density of 548.0 per square mile (211.6/km^{2}). The racial makeup of the city was 79.4% White, 18.4% African American, 0.1% Native American, 0.3% Asian, 0.5% from other races, and 1.2% from two or more races. Hispanic or Latino of any race were 1.8% of the population.

There were 1,316 households, of which 35.9% had children under the age of 18 living with them, 38.8% were married couples living together, 16.9% had a female householder with no husband present, 5.9% had a male householder with no wife present, and 38.4% were non-families. 31.9% of all households were made up of individuals, and 13.2% had someone living alone who was 65 years of age or older. The average household size was 2.46 and the average family size was 3.06.

The median age in the city was 35.9 years. 17% of residents were under the age of 18; 11.4% were between the ages of 18 and 24; 35.2% were from 25 to 44; 25.3% were from 45 to 64; and 11.1% were 65 years of age or older. The gender makeup of the city was 66.2% male and 33.8% female.

=== 2000 census ===
As of the census of 2000, there were 3,260 people, 1,290 households, and 798 families living in the city. The population density was 1,677.0 inhabitants per square mile (647.5/km^{2}). There were 1,420 housing units at an average density of 730.5 per square mile (282.0/km^{2}). The racial makeup of the city was 90.64% White, 7.67% African American, 0.12% Native American, 0.18% Asian, 0.21% from other races, and 1.17% from two or more races. Hispanic or Latino of any race were 0.74% of the population.

There were 1,290 households, out of which 32.5% had children under the age of 18 living with them, 42.9% were married couples living together, 14.7% had a female householder with no husband present, and 38.1% were non-families. 32.9% of all households were made up of individuals, and 16.1% had someone living alone who was 65 years of age or older. The average household size was 2.38 and the average family size was 3.03.

In the city, the population was spread out, with 27.2% under the age of 18, 8.6% from 18 to 24, 26.6% from 25 to 44, 19.3% from 45 to 64, and 18.3% who were 65 years of age or older. The median age was 36 years. For every 100 females, there were 85.9 males. For every 100 females age 18 and over, there were 80.6 males.

The median income for a household in the city was $27,287, and the median income for a family was $36,619. Males had a median income of $28,871 versus $18,873 for females. The per capita income for the city was $14,670. About 10.5% of families and 13.1% of the population were below the poverty line, including 14.4% of those under age 18 and 15.6% of those age 65 or over.

== Geography ==
Bowling Green lies at the junction of US highways 54 and 61. US 54 links Bowling Green with Illinois to the east and Jefferson City and the Lake of the Ozarks to the south and west, while US 61 connects the city with Hannibal to the north and the St. Louis area to the south.

According to the United States Census Bureau, the city has a total area of 2.70 square miles (6.99 km^{2}), of which, 2.69 square miles (6.97 km^{2}) is land and 0.01 square miles (0.03 km^{2}) is water.

=== Climate ===
Climate data for Bowling Green 1 E, Missouri (1991–2020 normals, extremes 1963–present)
| Month | Jan | Feb | Mar | Apr | May | Jun | Jul | Aug | Sep | Oct | Nov | Dec | Year |
|---|---|---|---|---|---|---|---|---|---|---|---|---|---|
| Record high °F (°C) | 72 (22) | 79 (26) | 90 (32) | 92 (33) | 96 (36) | 104 (40) | 105 (41) | 106 (41) | 102 (39) | 94 (34) | 83 (28) | 78 (26) | 106 (41) |
| Mean daily maximum °F (°C) | 35.8 (2.1) | 41.2 (5.1) | 52.0 (11.1) | 64.5 (18.1) | 73.2 (22.9) | 81.8 (27.7) | 85.9 (29.9) | 84.8 (29.3) | 77.9 (25.5) | 66.6 (19.2) | 52.7 (11.5) | 40.4 (4.7) | 63.1 (17.3) |
| Daily mean °F (°C) | 27.2 (−2.7) | 31.8 (−0.1) | 42.1 (5.6) | 53.7 (12.1) | 63.2 (17.3) | 72.1 (22.3) | 76.2 (24.6) | 74.7 (23.7) | 67.0 (19.4) | 55.8 (13.2) | 43.2 (6.2) | 32.1 (0.1) | 53.3 (11.8) |
| Mean daily minimum °F (°C) | 18.5 (−7.5) | 22.5 (−5.3) | 32.3 (0.2) | 43.0 (6.1) | 53.3 (11.8) | 62.3 (16.8) | 66.5 (19.2) | 64.6 (18.1) | 56.0 (13.3) | 44.9 (7.2) | 33.7 (0.9) | 23.9 (−4.5) | 43.5 (6.4) |
| Record low °F (°C) | −25 (−32) | −26 (−32) | −16 (−27) | 12 (−11) | 26 (−3) | 37 (3) | 42 (6) | 37 (3) | 24 (−4) | 16 (−9) | −8 (−22) | −21 (−29) | −26 (−32) |
| Average precipitation inches (mm) | 2.44 (62) | 2.06 (52) | 2.73 (69) | 4.46 (113) | 4.67 (119) | 4.55 (116) | 4.32 (110) | 3.57 (91) | 3.89 (99) | 2.95 (75) | 2.90 (74) | 2.07 (53) | 40.61 (1,031) |
| Average snowfall inches (cm) | 4.6 (12) | 5.0 (13) | 1.9 (4.8) | 0.2 (0.51) | 0.0 (0.0) | 0.0 (0.0) | 0.0 (0.0) | 0.0 (0.0) | 0.0 (0.0) | 0.0 (0.0) | 0.8 (2.0) | 3.1 (7.9) | 15.6 (40) |
| Average precipitation days (≥ 0.01 in) | 5.9 | 6.5 | 8.6 | 9.8 | 11.5 | 9.2 | 8.3 | 7.0 | 6.7 | 7.9 | 6.9 | 6.6 | 94.9 |
| Average snowy days (≥ 0.1 in) | 1.9 | 1.9 | 0.7 | 0.2 | 0.0 | 0.0 | 0.0 | 0.0 | 0.0 | 0.0 | 0.4 | 1.7 | 6.8 |
Source: NOAA

== Education ==
Bowling Green R-1 School District operates two elementary schools, one middle school and Bowling Green High School.

The town has a lending library, the Bowling Green Public Library.

== Transportation ==
=== Transit ===
Burlington Trailways provides intercity bus service to the city on a route between Cedar Rapids and St. Louis.

=== Highways ===
- US 54
- US 61
- US 54 Bus.
- US 61 Bus.
- Route 161

== Notable residents ==
- James Overton Broadhead, House of Representatives, Missouri Senate, 1st president of the American Bar Association.
- Bennett Champ Clark, United States Senator (1933–1945), United States Circuit Judge (1945–1954).
- Champ Clark, Speaker of the House of Representatives.
- Jack Dougherty, American actor.
- Cotton Fitzsimmons, NBA Coach. 832 wins in the NBA. Naismith Basketball Hall of Fame Class of 2021. Graduated from Bowling Green High School in 1949.
- William L. Hungate, United States Representative (1964–1977), United States federal judge (1979–1992). Graduated from Bowling Green High School in 1940.
- Glenn Jacobs, professional wrestler for the WWE, Kane. Mayor of Knox County, Tennessee (2017–present)
- Virginia Kirtley, American actress and writer.
- Arthur Murray, Major General, United States Army. Years of service: 1878–1915, 1917–1918.
- Sterling Price, Major General, 11th Governor of Missouri (1853–1857).
- William R. Purnell, United States Admiral. Years of service: 1910–1946.
- James Earl Ray, moved with his family to the community from Alton, Illinois at age 2. At age 7 he moved with his family to Ewing, Missouri.
- Raymond Phillips Sanderson, American sculptor and painter.
- Genevieve Clark Thomson, American suffragist.
- Chad Perkins, Speaker Pro Tem of the Missouri House of Representatives (2025–Present). Graduated from Bowling Green High School in 1997.

== See also ==
- List of cities in Missouri
