= Pike County, Missouri =

County in Missouri, United States

- County
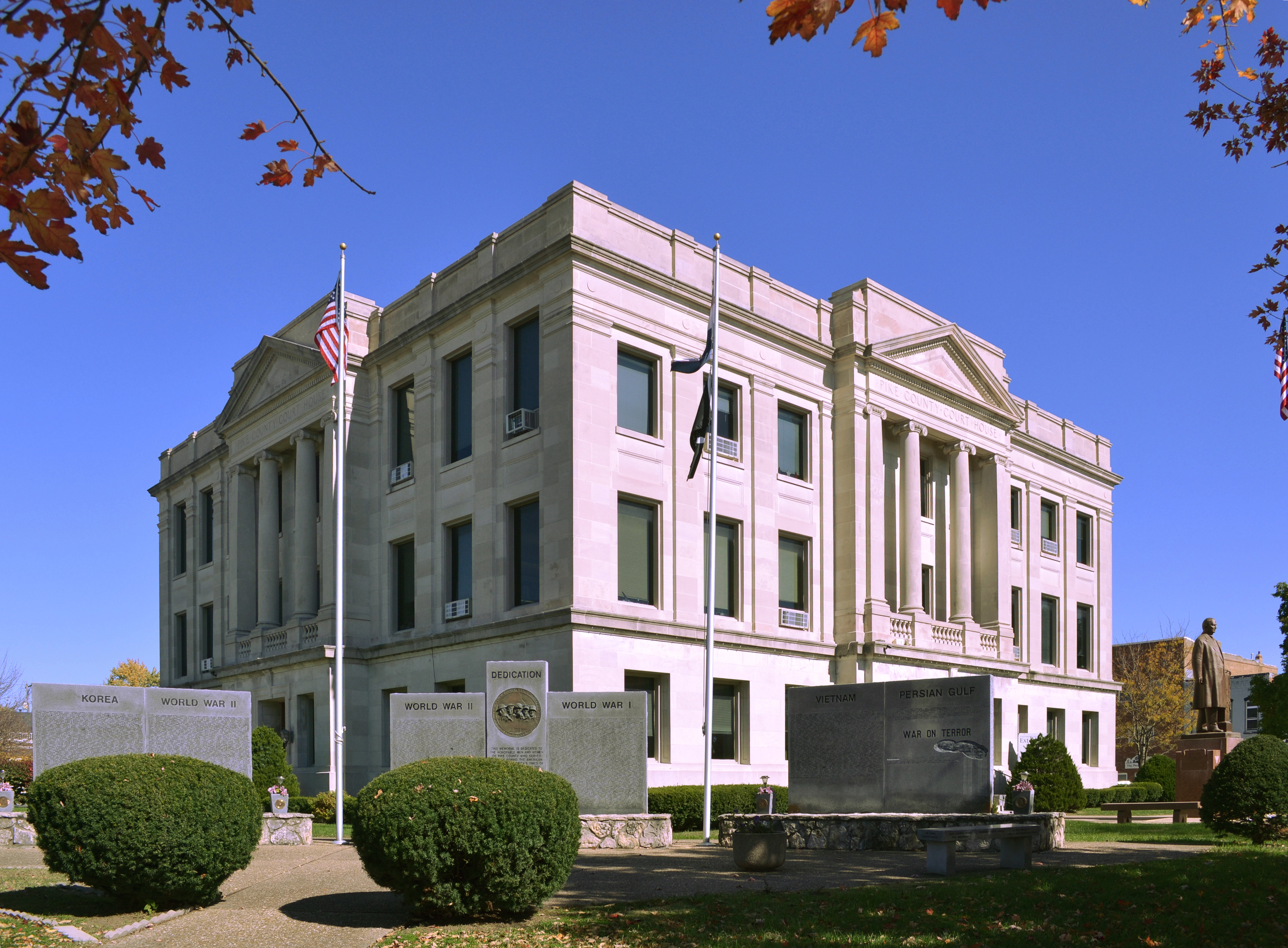
- The Pike County Courthouse in Bowling Green

- Location within the U.S. state of Missouri
- Coordinates: 39°20′N 91°10′W
- Country: United States
- State: Missouri
- Founded: December 14, 1818
- Named for: Zebulon M. Pike
- Seat: Bowling Green
- Largest city: Bowling Green

Area
  - Total: 685 sq mi (1,770 km^{2})
  - Land: 670 sq mi (1,700 km^{2})
  - Water: 14 sq mi (36 km^{2}) 2.1%

Population (2020)
  - Total: 17,587
  - Estimate (2025): 17,955 ▲
  - Density: 26.8/sq mi (10.3/km^{2})
- Time zone: UTC−6 (Central)
  - Summer (DST): UTC−5 (CDT)
- Congressional district: 6th
- Website: www.pikecountymo.net

Pike County is a county on the eastern border of the U.S. state of Missouri, bounded by the Mississippi River. As of the 2020 census, the population was 17,587. Its county seat is Bowling Green. Its namesake was a city in middle Kentucky, a region from where many early migrants came. The county was organized December 14, 1818, and named for explorer Zebulon Pike. The folksong "Sweet Betsy from Pike" is generally thought to be associated with Pike County, Missouri.

Pike County is said to be the home of Momo (The Missouri Monster). The first reported sightings in the 1970s were traced to various locations throughout the county.

== History ==
The first settler, other than Native Americans, was William Spencer who arrived in 1799. Spencer came for a salt spring now known as Spencer Lick, to start a salt-manufacturing business. The salt was made to be shipped to St. Louis, a new but growing town at the time. Spencer abandoned his business when unfriendly Native Americans became a threat to his safety. He relocated the enterprise to Ralls County.

The history of Pike County is complicated by the fact that at its establishment in 1818, it included today's county boundaries, plus all counties north of it and those counties bordering all of them to the west, a total area of over six or seven times larger than its current size and thus covering most of the northeastern border area of today's state of Missouri. Pike County was gradually reduced in size by the creation of Ralls County and subsequent new counties, including Marion, Lewis, Clark, Scotland, Knox, Shelby, and Monroe.

The county was first settled by migrants from the Upper South. Some, though not all, were sympathetic to the Confederate cause in later decades. After the end of the post-Civil-War Reconstruction era, some of the county's inhabitants enforced Jim Crow laws and racial segregation in the county to maintain white supremacy. This occurred despite the fact that key US/Unionist military operations to control "Confederate" upstarts were launched from Pike County and had bases there.

Five African Americans were tragically lynched in Pike County between 1883 and 1921. Among those were Curtis and Sam Young, who were both lynched for allegedly murdering the city marshall, Walter Meloan, on June 6, 1898, in Clarksville, a small town on the Mississippi River. Pike tied with Howard County, Missouri for the highest number of lynchings of African Americans in the state during this historical period.

== Geography ==
According to the U.S. Census Bureau, the county has a total area of 685 square miles (1,770 km^{2}), of which 670 square miles (1,700 km^{2}) is land and 14 square miles (36 km^{2}) (2.1%) is water.

=== Adjacent counties ===
- Ralls County (northwest)
- Pike County, Illinois (northeast)
- Calhoun County, Illinois (east)
- Lincoln County (south)
- Montgomery County (southwest)
- Audrain County (west)

=== Transit ===
- Burlington Trailways
- OATS Transit

=== Railroads ===
- BNSF Railway
- Canadian Pacific Kansas City

=== Major highways ===
- US 54
- US 54 Bus.
- US 54 Bus.
- US 61
- US 61 Bus.
- US 61 Spur
- Route 79
- Route 154
- Route 161
- Great River Road

=== Former roadways ===
- Red Ball Route
- Mississippi River Scenic Route
- Route 9
- Route 22
- Route 26
- Route 29

=== National protected area ===
- Clarence Cannon National Wildlife Refuge

== Demographics ==
Historical population
| Census | Pop. | Note | %± |
|---|---|---|---|
| 1820 | 3,747 | | — |
| 1830 | 6,129 | | 63.6% |
| 1840 | 10,646 | | 73.7% |
| 1850 | 13,609 | | 27.8% |
| 1860 | 18,417 | | 35.3% |
| 1870 | 23,076 | | 25.3% |
| 1880 | 26,715 | | 15.8% |
| 1890 | 26,321 | | −1.5% |
| 1900 | 25,744 | | −2.2% |
| 1910 | 22,556 | | −12.4% |
| 1920 | 20,345 | | −9.8% |
| 1930 | 18,001 | | −11.5% |
| 1940 | 18,327 | | 1.8% |
| 1950 | 16,844 | | −8.1% |
| 1960 | 16,706 | | −0.8% |
| 1970 | 16,928 | | 1.3% |
| 1980 | 17,568 | | 3.8% |
| 1990 | 15,969 | | −9.1% |
| 2000 | 18,351 | | 14.9% |
| 2010 | 18,516 | | 0.9% |
| 2020 | 17,587 | | −5.0% |
| 2025 (est.) | 17,955 | ▲ | 2.1% |
U.S. Decennial Census; 1790-1960 1900–90; 1990-2000 2010 2024

=== 2020 census ===
As of the 2020 census, the county had a population of 17,587. The median age was 40.6 years, 23.2% of residents were under the age of 18, and 18.8% were 65 years of age or older. For every 100 females there were 114.7 males, and for every 100 females age 18 and over there were 116.4 males age 18 and over.

The racial makeup of the county was 88.4% White, 5.4% Black or African American, 0.3% American Indian and Alaska Native, 0.2% Asian, 0.0% Native Hawaiian and Pacific Islander, 0.9% from some other race, and 4.9% from two or more races. Hispanic or Latino residents of any race comprised 2.5% of the population.

0.0% of residents lived in urban areas, while 100.0% lived in rural areas.

There were 6,486 households in the county, of which 30.6% had children under the age of 18 living with them and 24.8% had a female householder with no spouse or partner present. About 28.6% of all households were made up of individuals and 14.2% had someone living alone who was 65 years of age or older.

There were 7,603 housing units, of which 14.7% were vacant. Among occupied housing units, 71.4% were owner-occupied and 28.6% were renter-occupied. The homeowner vacancy rate was 1.7% and the rental vacancy rate was 7.3%.

Pike County Racial Composition
| Race | Num. | Perc. |
|---|---|---|
| White (NH) | 15,383 | 87.47% |
| Black or African American (NH) | 942 | 5.36% |
| Native American (NH) | 40 | 0.23% |
| Asian (NH) | 23 | 0.13% |
| Pacific Islander (NH) | 7 | 0.04% |
| Other/Mixed (NH) | 758 | 4.31% |
| Hispanic or Latino | 434 | 2.47% |

=== 2010 census ===
As of the census of 2010, there were 18,516 people, 6,451 households, and 4,476 families residing in the county. The population density was 27 people per square mile (10 people/km^{2}). There were 7,493 housing units at an average density of 11 units per square mile (4.2/km^{2}). The racial makeup of the county was 88.44% White, 9.17% Black or African American, 0.24% Native American, 0.15% Asian, 0.04% Pacific Islander, 0.92% from other races, and 1.04% from two or more races. Approximately 1.61% of the population were Hispanic or Latino of any race. 24.6% were of American, 24.5% German, 8.9% English and 8.5% Irish ancestry.

There were 6,451 households, out of which 31.30% had children under the age of 18 living with them, 55.70% were married couples living together, 9.60% had a female householder with no husband present, and 30.60% were non-families. 26.70% of all households were made up of individuals, and 12.90% had someone living alone who was 65 years of age or older. The average household size was 2.50 and the average family size was 3.01.

In the county, the population was spread out, with 23.40% under the age of 18, 9.10% from 18 to 24, 29.80% from 25 to 44, 22.80% from 45 to 64, and 15.00% who were 65 years of age or older. The median age was 38 years. For every 100 females there were 119.20 males. For every 100 females age 18 and over, there were 123.80 males.

The median income for a household in the county was $32,373, and the median income for a family was $39,059. Males had a median income of $28,528 versus $19,426 for females. The per capita income for the county was $14,462. 15.50% of the population and 11.90% of families were below the poverty line. 20.20% of those under the age of 18 and 15.20% of those 65 and older were living below the poverty line.

== Education ==
K-12 school districts with any amount of territory in the county, no matter how slight, include:

- Bowling Green R-I School District
- Louisiana R-II School District
- Pike County R-III School District
- Ralls County R-II School District
- Silex R-I School District
- Van-Far R-I School District
- Wellsville-Middletown R-I School District

There is one elementary school district, Boncl R-X School District.

=== Public schools ===
- Boncl R-X School District – Louisiana
  - Boncl Elementary School (PK-08)
- Bowling Green R-I School District – Bowling Green
  - Bowling Green Elementary School (PK-05)
  - Frankford Elementary School (K-05)
  - Bowling Green Middle School (06-08)
  - Bowling Green High School (09-12)
- Louisiana R-II School District – Louisiana
  - Louisiana Elementary School (PK-05)
  - Louisiana Middle School (06-08)
  - Louisiana High School (09-12)
- Pike County R-III School District – Clarksville
  - Clopton Elementary School (PK-06)
  - Clopton High School (07-12)

=== Private schools ===
- Pike County Christian School – Curryville (K-12) – Baptist
- St. Clement School – Bowling Green (K-09) – Roman Catholic

=== Public libraries ===
- Bowling Green Free Public Library
- Clarksville Public Library
- Louisiana Public Library

== Communities ==
=== Cities ===
- Bowling Green (county seat)
- Clarksville
- Curryville
- Frankford
- Louisiana

=== Villages ===
- Annada
- Ashburn
- Eolia
- Paynesville
- Tarrants

=== Census-designated places ===
- Ashley
- St. Clement

=== Other unincorporated places ===
- Booth
- Calumet
- Cyrene
- Edgewood
- Estes
- Farmer
- Gazette
- Kissenger
- McCune
- McIntosh
- New Harmony
- New Hartford
- Sledd
- Spencerburg
- Stark
- Vera

== Politics ==
=== Local ===
The Republican Party predominantly controls politics at the county level in Pike County, with Republicans holding many of the elected positions, with exceptions as stated below. Note that, per the tables below, Republican Pike County voters prevailed in Missouri gubernatorial elections of 2016 and 2004, and came close to a tie for dominance in 2012, followed by a clear overtaking of county politics in 2016, in contrast with a tradition of nominal Democratic party affiliations of county-level officials.

Pike County, Missouri

Elected countywide officials
| Assessor | Trace R. Foster | Republican |
| Circuit Clerk | Jerri Harrelson | Democratic |
| County Clerk | Laura Stumbaugh | Republican |
| Collector | Tara Eskew | Democratic |
| Commissioner (presiding) | Bill Allen | Republican |
| Commissioner (district 1) | Tom Wallace | Republican |
| Commissioner (district 2) | Brock Bailey | Republican |
| Coroner | Colton Marti | Republican |
| Prosecuting Attorney | Alex G. Ellison | Republican |
| Public Administrator | Debbie Tepen | Republican |
| Recorder | Kim Martin Luebrecht | Republican |
| Sheriff | Stephen Korte | Republican |
| Treasurer | Patti Crane | Democratic |

=== State ===
Past Gubernatorial Elections Results
| Year | Republican | Democratic | Third Parties |
|---|---|---|---|
| 2024 | 78.63% 6,083 | 20.01% 1,548 | 1.36% 105 |
| 2020 | 74.73% 5,727 | 23.62% 1,810 | 1.66% 127 |
| 2016 | 59.45% 4,389 | 37.31% 2,755 | 3.24% 239 |
| 2012 | 47.66% 3,482 | 50.03% 3,655 | 2.31% 169 |
| 2008 | 49.09% 3,850 | 49.19% 3,858 | 1.73% 135 |
| 2004 | 55.32% 4,416 | 43.02% 3,434 | 1.65% 132 |
| 2000 | 46.74% 3,427 | 50.70% 3,717 | 2.56% 188 |
| 1996 | 30.30% 2,027 | 67.65% 4,525 | 2.05% 137 |

Pike County is a part of Missouri's 40th District in the Missouri House of Representatives and is represented by Chad Perkins (R-Bowling Green).

Missouri House of Representatives — District 40 — Pike County (2016)
| Party | Candidate | Votes | % | ±% |
|---|---|---|---|---|
| Republican | Jim Hansen | 6,301 | 100.00% | +24.00 |

Missouri House of Representatives — District 40 — Pike County (2014)
| Party | Candidate | Votes | % | ±% |
|---|---|---|---|---|
| Republican | Jim Hansen | 3,091 | 76.00% | +18.88 |
| Democratic | Lowell Jackson | 976 | 24.00% | −18.88 |

Missouri House of Representatives — District 40 — Pike County (2012)
| Party | Candidate | Votes | % | ±% |
|---|---|---|---|---|
| Republican | Jim Hansen | 4,121 | 57.12% | |
| Democratic | Paul Quinn | 3,094 | 42.88% | |

Pike County is a part of Missouri's 18th District in the Missouri Senate and is currently represented by Brian Munzlinger (R-Williamstown).

Missouri Senate — District 18 — Pike County (2014)
| Party | Candidate | Votes | % | ±% |
|---|---|---|---|---|
| Republican | Brian Munzlinger | 3,287 | 100.00% | |

=== Federal ===
U.S. Senate — Missouri — Pike County (2016)
| Party | Candidate | Votes | % | ±% |
|---|---|---|---|---|
| Republican | Roy Blunt | 4,084 | 55.55% | +9.21 |
| Democratic | Jason Kander | 2,872 | 39.06% | −8.21 |
| Libertarian | Jonathan Dine | 192 | 2.61% | −3.78 |
| Green | Johnathan McFarland | 84 | 1.14% | +1.14 |
| Constitution | Fred Ryman | 120 | 1.63% | +1.63 |

U.S. Senate — Missouri — Pike County (2012)
| Party | Candidate | Votes | % | ±% |
|---|---|---|---|---|
| Republican | Todd Akin | 3,381 | 46.34% | |
| Democratic | Claire McCaskill | 3,449 | 47.27% | |
| Libertarian | Jonathan Dine | 466 | 6.39% | |

Pike County is included in Missouri's 6th Congressional District and is currently represented by Sam Graves (R-Tarkio) in the U.S. House of Representatives.

U.S. House of Representatives — Missouri's 6th Congressional District — Pike County (2016)
| Party | Candidate | Votes | % | ±% |
|---|---|---|---|---|
| Republican | Sam Graves | 4,907 | 68.33% | +0.08 |
| Democratic | David M. Blackwell | 2,051 | 28.56% | +0.08 |
| Libertarian | Russ Lee Monchil | 143 | 1.99% | −1.28 |
| Green | Mike Diel | 80 | 1.11% | +1.11 |

U.S. House of Representatives — Missouri’s 6th Congressional District — Pike County (2014)
| Party | Candidate | Votes | % | ±% |
|---|---|---|---|---|
| Republican | Sam Graves | 2,696 | 68.25% | +8.22 |
| Democratic | Bill Hedge | 1,125 | 28.48% | −8.83 |
| Libertarian | Russ Lee Monchil | 129 | 3.27% | +0.61 |

U.S. House of Representatives — Missouri's 6th Congressional District — Pike County (2012)
| Party | Candidate | Votes | % | ±% |
|---|---|---|---|---|
| Republican | Sam Graves | 4,151 | 60.03% | |
| Democratic | Kyle Yarber | 2,580 | 37.31% | |
| Libertarian | Russ Lee Monchil | 184 | 2.66% | |

United States presidential election results for Pike County, Missouri
| Year | Republican | | Democratic | | Third party(ies) | |
| Year | No. | % | No. | % | No. | % |
|---|---|---|---|---|---|---|
| 1888 | 2,729 | 43.26% | 3,493 | 55.37% | 86 | 1.36% |
| 1892 | 2,564 | 40.74% | 3,655 | 58.08% | 74 | 1.18% |
| 1896 | 2,884 | 42.66% | 3,839 | 56.78% | 38 | 0.56% |
| 1900 | 2,534 | 40.01% | 3,747 | 59.16% | 53 | 0.84% |
| 1904 | 2,445 | 43.60% | 3,113 | 55.51% | 50 | 0.89% |
| 1908 | 2,403 | 41.78% | 3,326 | 57.82% | 23 | 0.40% |
| 1912 | 1,901 | 39.15% | 2,720 | 56.01% | 235 | 4.84% |
| 1916 | 2,322 | 40.57% | 3,344 | 58.42% | 58 | 1.01% |
| 1920 | 3,860 | 43.07% | 5,034 | 56.16% | 69 | 0.77% |
| 1924 | 3,715 | 46.44% | 4,040 | 50.51% | 244 | 3.05% |
| 1928 | 4,569 | 54.74% | 3,749 | 44.91% | 29 | 0.35% |
| 1932 | 2,462 | 29.38% | 5,783 | 69.02% | 134 | 1.60% |
| 1936 | 2,871 | 32.53% | 5,898 | 66.82% | 58 | 0.66% |
| 1940 | 3,707 | 39.07% | 5,742 | 60.51% | 40 | 0.42% |
| 1944 | 3,351 | 41.72% | 4,659 | 58.01% | 22 | 0.27% |
| 1948 | 2,448 | 33.08% | 4,934 | 66.68% | 18 | 0.24% |
| 1952 | 3,836 | 45.47% | 4,582 | 54.31% | 18 | 0.21% |
| 1956 | 3,474 | 45.08% | 4,232 | 54.92% | 0 | 0.00% |
| 1960 | 3,900 | 48.77% | 4,096 | 51.23% | 0 | 0.00% |
| 1964 | 1,944 | 26.94% | 5,273 | 73.06% | 0 | 0.00% |
| 1968 | 3,072 | 43.47% | 3,192 | 45.17% | 803 | 11.36% |
| 1972 | 4,452 | 62.61% | 2,659 | 37.39% | 0 | 0.00% |
| 1976 | 3,355 | 46.84% | 3,770 | 52.64% | 37 | 0.52% |
| 1980 | 3,932 | 51.80% | 3,454 | 45.50% | 205 | 2.70% |
| 1984 | 3,933 | 54.28% | 3,313 | 45.72% | 0 | 0.00% |
| 1988 | 3,271 | 46.07% | 3,816 | 53.75% | 13 | 0.18% |
| 1992 | 2,255 | 30.74% | 3,609 | 49.20% | 1,472 | 20.07% |
| 1996 | 2,209 | 33.00% | 3,495 | 52.22% | 989 | 14.78% |
| 2000 | 3,648 | 49.63% | 3,557 | 48.39% | 146 | 1.99% |
| 2004 | 4,314 | 53.66% | 3,670 | 45.65% | 56 | 0.70% |
| 2008 | 4,268 | 53.97% | 3,487 | 44.09% | 153 | 1.93% |
| 2012 | 4,577 | 62.52% | 2,582 | 35.27% | 162 | 2.21% |
| 2016 | 5,274 | 71.00% | 1,806 | 24.31% | 348 | 4.68% |
| 2020 | 5,863 | 76.19% | 1,717 | 22.31% | 115 | 1.49% |
| 2024 | 6,151 | 78.62% | 1,618 | 20.68% | 55 | 0.70% |

=== Missouri presidential preference primary (2008) ===
Former U.S. Senator Hillary Clinton (D-New York) received more votes, a total of 1,447, than any candidate from either party in Pike County during the 2008 presidential primary. She also received more votes individually than the entire number of votes cast in the Republican Primary in Pike County.

== See also ==
- National Register of Historic Places listings in Pike County, Missouri
