= Market House =

A market house is a covered space historically used as a marketplace

Market House may also refer to:

== England ==
- Market House, Kingston
- Market House, Millom
- Market House, Rothwell
- Market House, Somerton
- Market House, St Austell
- Market House, Tetbury
- Market House, Tring
- Market House, Uxbridge
- Market House, Winster

== Ireland ==
- Market House, Monaghan, Republic of Ireland
- Market House, Newtownards, Northern Ireland

== United States ==
- Market House (Portland, Maine)
- Old Market House (Galena, Illinois), listed on the National Register of Historic Places (NRHP)
- Market House (Paducah, Kentucky), listed on the NRHP in Kentucky
- Paducah Market House District, Paducah, Kentucky, listed on the NRHP in Kentucky
- Market House (Omaha), Nebraska
- Market House (Oswego, New York), NRHP-listed
- Market Hall and Sheds, Charleston, South Carolina, NRHP-listed
- Market House (Fayetteville, North Carolina), NRHP-listed
- Market House Square District, Fayetteville, North Carolina, listed on the NRHP in North Carolina
- Market House (Providence, Rhode Island), NRHP-listed
- Old Market House Museum, Goliad, TX, listed on the NRHP in Texas

== See also ==
- City Market (disambiguation)
- Market Houses in the Republic of Ireland
- List of Irish towns with a Market House
- Market hall (disambiguation)
