= Old Market =

Old Market or variations with House, Building, or Historic District, may refer to:

in the United States

(by state)

- Old Market (Louisville, Georgia), listed on the NRHP in Georgia
- Old Market House (Galena, Illinois), listed on the NRHP in Illinois
- Old Market (Omaha, Nebraska), listed as Old Market Historic District on the NRHP in Nebraska
- Old Market Building (Georgetown, South Carolina), Georgetown, SC, listed on the NRHP in South Carolina
- Old Market House Museum, Goliad, Texas, listed on the NRHP in Texas

in England

- Old Market, Bristol, a Conservation Area around Old Market Street in Bristol
- The Old Market, Hove, a cultural performance venue
- Old Market, Hereford, a new retail shopping quarter in the city of Hereford, opened Spring 2014
