= Market Mall (disambiguation) =

Market Mall is one of the largest malls in Calgary, Alberta, Canada.

Market Mall may also refer to:

- Market Mall (Saskatoon), a shopping centre in Saskatoon, Saskatchewan, Canada

== See also ==
- Market hall (disambiguation)
- Market Place Mall, an enclosed shopping mall located in Champaign, Illinois, U.S.
- Market Village Mall, a former shopping mall in Markham, Ontario, Canada
