= City Market =

City Market may refer to:

== Finland ==
- K-citymarket

== Malta ==
- Valletta Market, known as Is-Suq tal-Belt (City Market) in Maltese

== Mexico ==
- City Market (Mexico), a subsidiary of La Comer supermarket chain

== United States ==
- Ponce City Market, Atlanta, Georgia, listed on the National Register of Historic Places (NRHP)
- City Market (Savannah, Georgia)
- City Market (Indianapolis, Indiana), NRHP-listed
- City Market (Davenport, Iowa), NRHP-listed
- City Market (Lansing, Michigan)
- River Market, Kansas City, Missouri, contains City Market
- City Market (Louisiana, Missouri), NRHP-listed
- City Market (Raleigh, North Carolina)
- City Market (Charleston, South Carolina), NRHP-listed as "Market Hall and Sheds"
- City Market (Petersburg, Virginia), NRHP-listed
- City Market (Madison, Wisconsin), NRHP-listed

Others:

- City Market (US grocery store chain), a grocery store operating in the western United States

== See also ==
- Market House (disambiguation)
