= Galena, Illinois =

City in the United States

- City
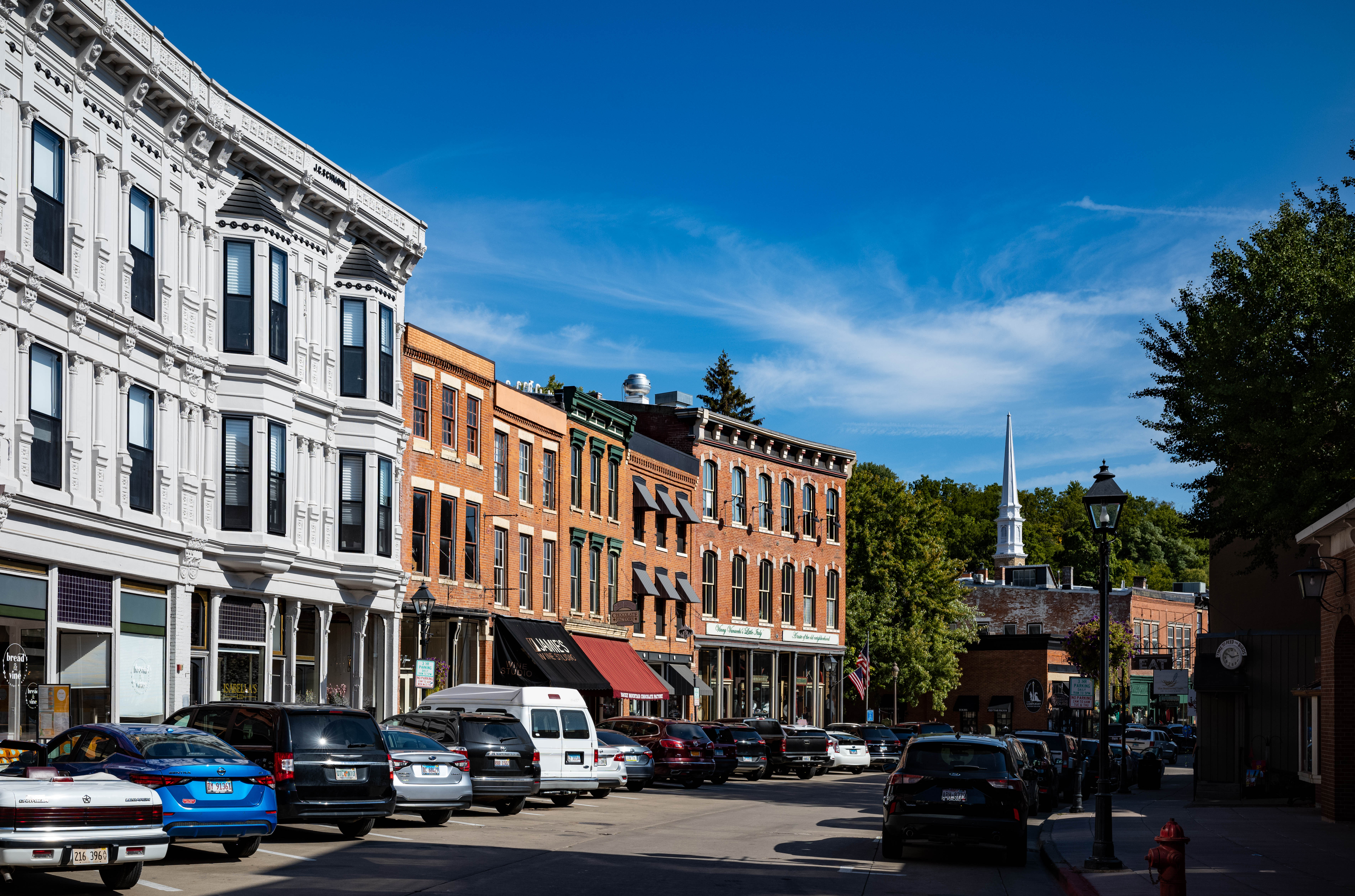
- Main Street in 2023

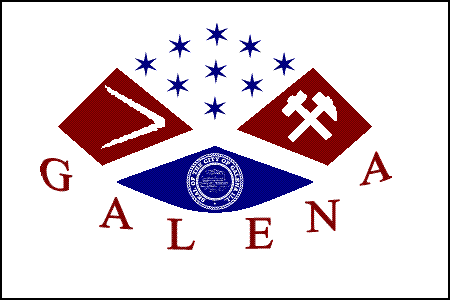
- Flag Seal
- Etymology: Galena ore
- Interactive map of Galena, Illinois
- Location within Illinois Location within the United States
- Coordinates: 42°25′19″N 90°25′45″W
- Country: United States
- State: Illinois
- County: Jo Daviess
- Township: East Galena, West Galena, and Rawlins
- Settled: 1690s (French)
- Founded: 1826
- Incorporated: 1835
- Chartered: 1841

Government
  - Mayor: Terry Renner

Area
  - Total: 4.51 sq mi (11.67 km^{2})
  - Land: 4.50 sq mi (11.65 km^{2})
  - Water: 0.0077 sq mi (0.02 km^{2})
- Elevation: 709 ft (216 m)

Population (2020)
  - Total: 3,308
  - Density: 736/sq mi (284.3/km^{2})
- Time zone: UTC-6 (North American Central (CST))
  - Summer (DST): UTC-5 (CDT)
- ZIP Code(s): 61036
- Area code: 815
- FIPS code: 17-28300
- GNIS feature ID: 2394840
- Website: http://www.cityofgalena.org/

Galena is the largest city in Jo Daviess County, Illinois, United States, and its county seat. It had a population of 3,308 at the 2020 census. A 581-acre (235 ha) section of the city is listed on the National Register of Historic Places as the Galena Historic District. The city is named for the mineral galena, which was in the ore that formed the basis for the region's early lead mining economy.

Native Americans, primarily Meskwaki, Ho-Chunk, Sauk, and Menominee had mined galena in the area for more than a thousand years before European Americans settled in the area. Owing to these deposits, Galena was the site of the first major mineral rush in the United States. By 1828, the population was estimated at 10,000, rivaling the population of Chicago at the time. Galena developed as the largest steamboat hub on the Mississippi River north of St. Louis. Galena was the home of Ulysses S. Grant and eight other Civil War generals. Today, the city is a tourist destination known for its history, architecture, and resorts.

== History ==
=== Precolonial and colonial history ===
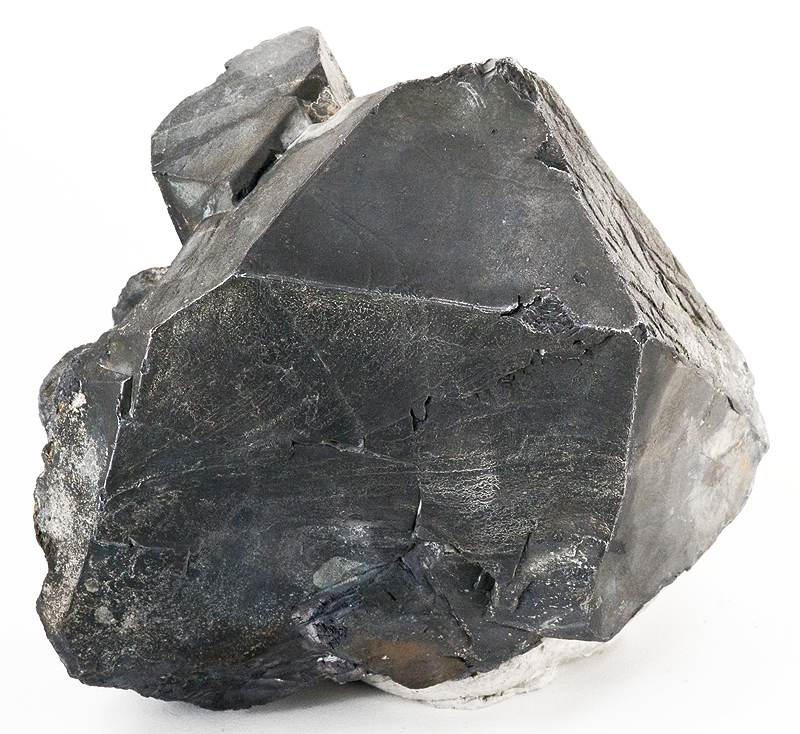
A large galena crystal from the Galena mines

The city is named for galena, the natural form of lead sulfide (PbS) and the most important lead ore. Native Americans mined the ore for use in burial rituals. The Havana Hopewell first traded galena in the area during the Middle Woodland period (c. 1–400 CE). However, the use of galena in the Havana territory is uncertain; very little has been identified in burial mounds. During the Mississippian period (900–1500 CE), galena saw use as body paint.

In 1658 French explorers, probably via contact with the Sioux, first noted lead deposits in the Upper Mississippi Valley. A 1703 French map identified the northwestern Illinois area as mines de plumb. Northwestern Illinois was inhabited by the Sauk and Meskwaki when the French arrived. In the 1690s, French trappers discovered the area and began mining the lead. However, conflicts with the Sioux prevented large-scale mining until Julien Dubuque's Mines opened across the river in 1788.

The French named the settlement as La Pointe, and early American settlers adopted this name as "The Point" after the United States acquired the territory in the Louisiana Purchase of 1803. Early documentation officially records the name as "Fever River" for the wild beans that grew there, an early name for the Galena River. This name did not appear to be widely used.

A visitor in 1829 described the embryonic town:

The town of Galena was built in the most filthy inconvenient spot that can be imagined. It stands on the side of a steep hill, six miles from the mouth of Fever river, and at the head of its navigation. Whenever the river overflows, which it does very often, it washes the lower street of Galena. Whenever it rains, boots cannot defend the legs from pollution; the town is a quagmire. When I saw Galena last, it contained two rough stone buildings; all the rest were of logs; some hewn, some rough. It had three taverns, and a great many shops or stores. It was not then known whether it belonged to Michigan or Illinois; consequently, there was no provision for the administration of Justice.

George Davenport, a retired colonel in the United States Army, successfully shipped Galena's first boatload of lead ore in 1816 down the Mississippi River. Three years later, Jesse W. Shull built a trading post. The Thomas H. January family, who arrived in 1821 from Maysville, Kentucky, are considered the first permanent American settlers. The next year, the US Department of War assumed control of the mines and leased the lands out to operators. A large group of colonists led by Dr. Moses Meeker and James Harris arrived in 1823. Steamboat trade began in 1824.

=== American Boomtown ===
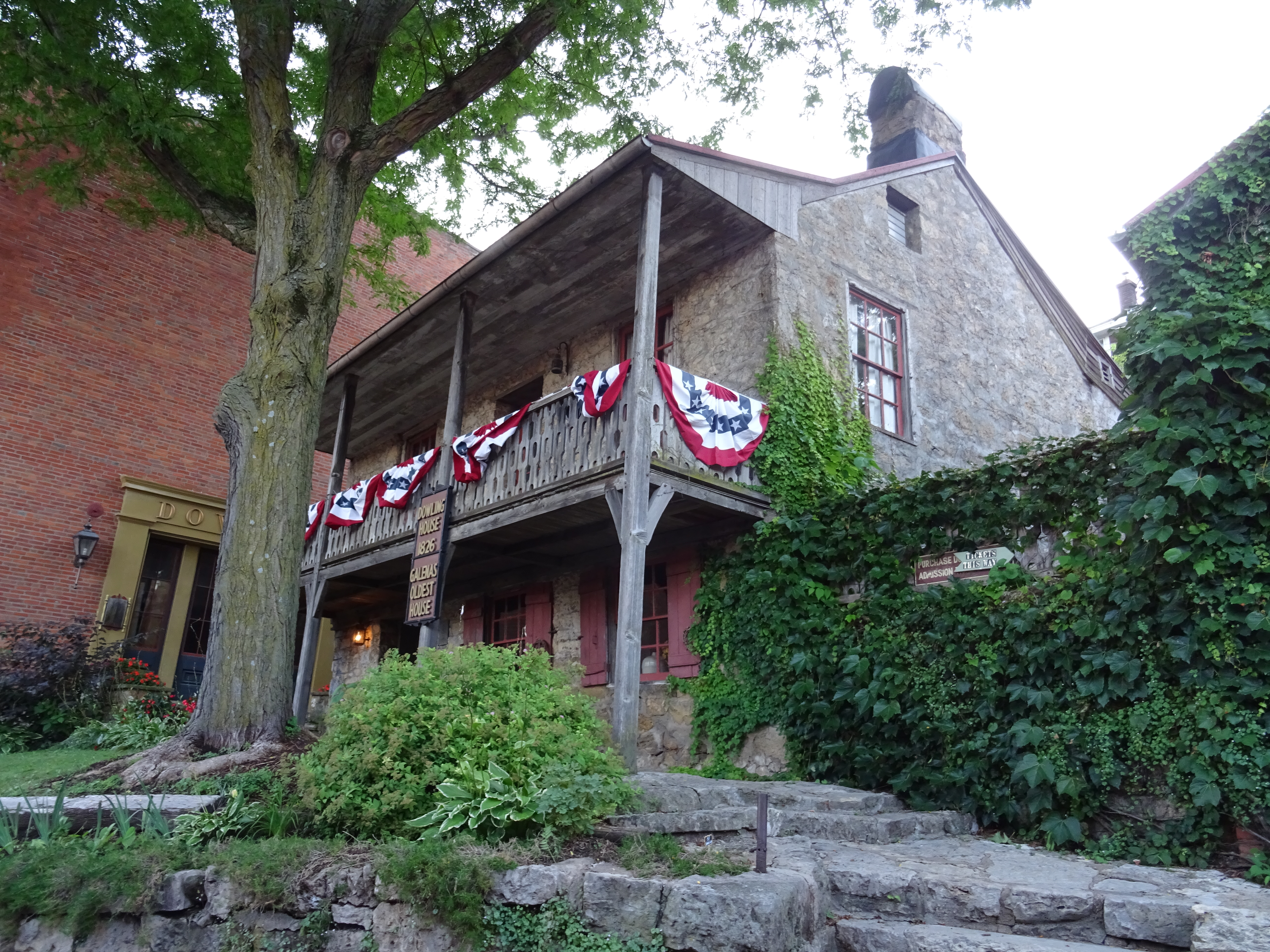
The Dowling House (1826–27) is the oldest building in Galena.

The first official lease of the mines on behalf of the US government was dated September 30, 1822, and made to James Johnson, brother of Vice President Richard Mentor Johnson. Martin Thomas, appointed by the government in 1824 to oversee mine leases, was commissioned to survey the mines in 1826.

The name "Galena" was purportedly proposed during a town meeting that year; rejected names included Jackson, Harrison, and Jo Daviess. After Thomas platted the town, starting in June 1827, settlers could lease plots from the government. The land remained in government possession until the leasing system was eased out in 1836–37. When Jo Daviess County was founded in 1827, Galena was named its county seat. This established the first courts in Galena; previous legal proceedings were heard in front of the Superintendent of Lead Mines. 21 million pounds of lead were mined in Galena from 1825 to 1828, and the population skyrocketed in that time from 200 to 10,000.

Local native tribes, then mostly Meskwaki and Ho-Chunk, permitted settlers to mine in established areas in Galena. However, the growth of the city led settlers to encroach on native land claims, as they sought new veins of lead. Following a murder of a pioneer family near Prairie du Chien, Wisconsin, by the Winnebago, Galena closed its mines for safety and European-American residents prepared for war. They constructed forts at nearby Elizabeth and Apple River; although these were not used during the conflict, the forts provided residents with security and protection. The ensuing Winnebago War was little more than a skirmish, but as a result, the US annexed more lands near the city in the resulting 1829 Treaty of Prairie du Chien which they forced on the Winnebago.

A meeting of townspeople on February 1, 1830, established the first fire department. At a town meeting at the county courthouse on September 7, 1835, sixty-five residents approved a motion for incorporation as a town. Eight days later, five individuals were elected as the first trustees. Incorporation was approved by the county board of trustees on October 2, and the first meeting of trustees occurred the next day. The 15th Illinois General Assembly (1836–37) codified the trustee election process. A steamboat was selected as the town seal on May 22, 1837.

A state law governing local jurisdictions resulted in the town holding its first elections for mayor and aldermen on May 24, 1841, to replace the board of trustees. Charles S. Hempstead was elected the first mayor, with 185 of the 356 votes cast. The first US census of the town was also held that year, recording 1,900 inhabitants. Hempstead would serve until 1845.

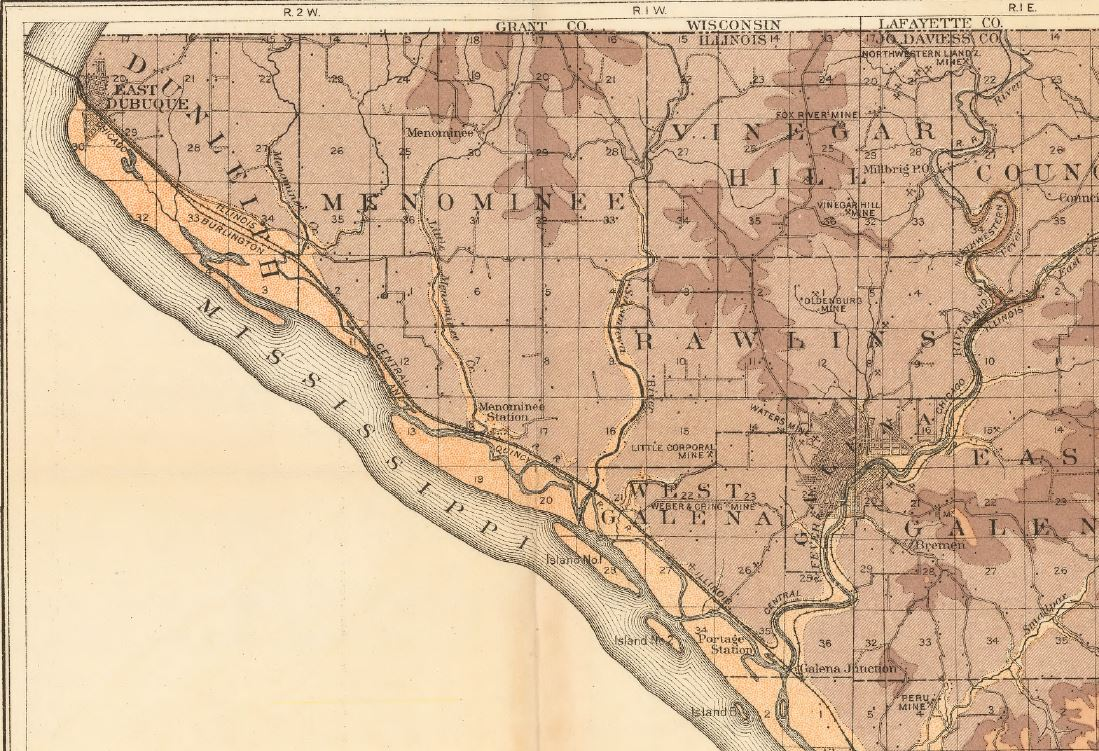
Geological map of Galena area with the location of key mines noted

Indigenous peoples of the Americas traded galena with French traders as early as 1692. Julien Dubuque mined the ore in Iowa from 1788 until 1810. From 1807 until 1834, the United States government controlled leases, after which the lands were put up for sale. In 1839, David Dale Owen made a geologic survey of the region. The Ordovician Galena limestone contained most of the galena ore, and peak productivity occurred between 1840 and 1850. By 1845 Galena was producing nearly 27,000 tons of lead ore annually, and Jo Daviess County was producing 80 percent of the lead in the United States. In 1852, the region produced 87 percent of the American output, and 10 percent of the world's, with pollutants from Galena's industry found as far away as Lake Matoaka in Tidewater Virginia.

Once one of the most important cities in the state, Galena was a hub on the Mississippi River between St. Louis and Saint Paul. Due to erosion, the Galena River is now inaccessible to steamboats. The first railroad built in Chicago, the Galena and Chicago Union Railroad, was intended to join the two cities but construction ended in 1853 at Freeport. Trackage between Freeport and Galena was completed by the Illinois Central Railroad in 1854, and later extended west to Dubuque, Sioux City, and Council Bluffs. Galena received national attention in the 1860s as the home of Ulysses S. Grant.

=== Decline ===
Following a sharp decline in the demand for lead (which had been the city's chief income source during the early 19th century), Galena's population has dropped from 14,000 in the mid-19th century, to 3,396 in the early 21st century.

=== Today ===
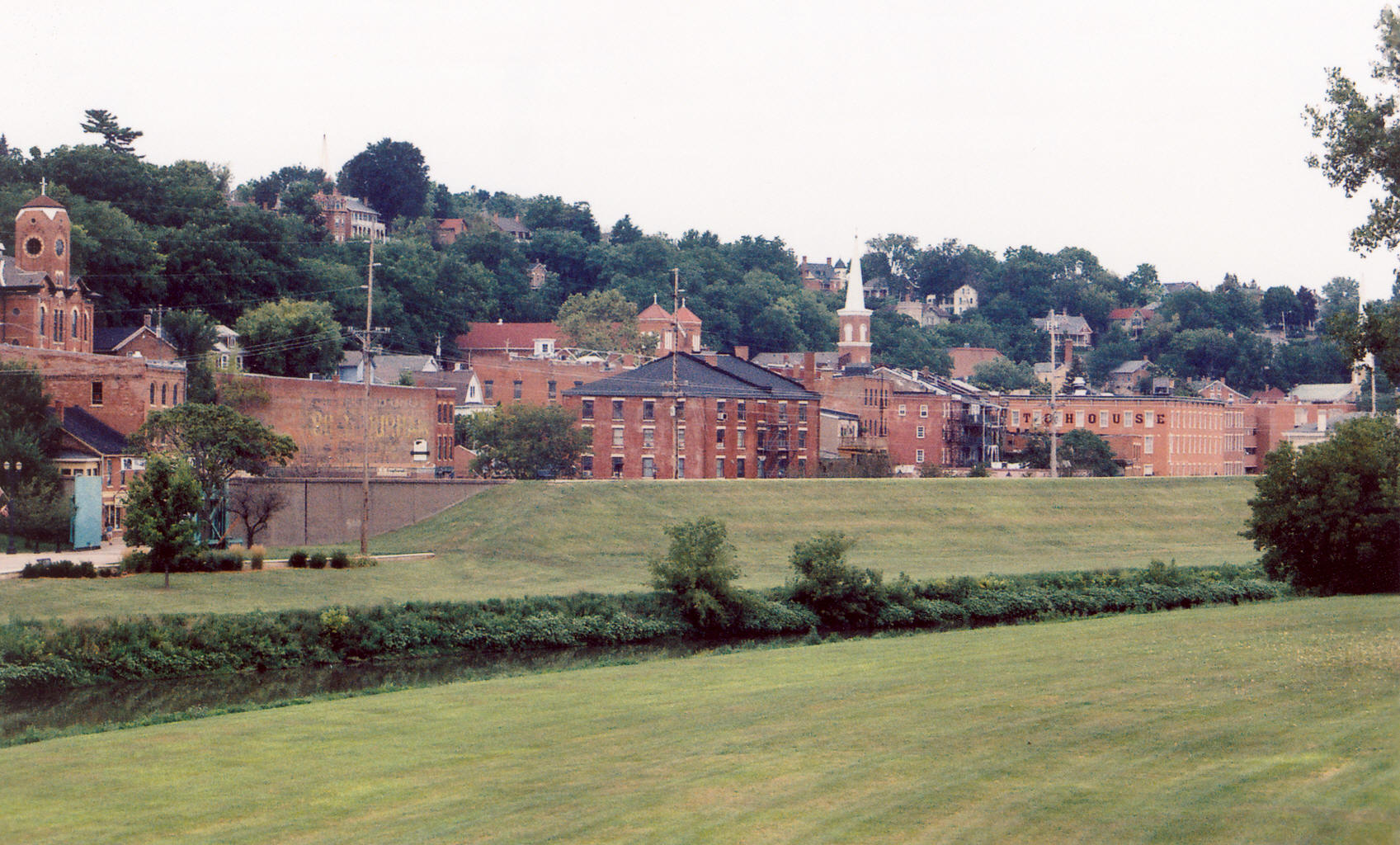
View of downtown Galena

Galena's official flag was adopted in 1976 to symbolize mining, agriculture, steamboats, and the nine American Civil War generals who lived in the city. Until the late 1980s, Galena was a small rural farming community.

In 1990, local industries included a Kraft Foods cheese plant, Lemfco Foundry, John Westwick's foundry, and Microswitch, Inc. In the 1980s, Galena Mayor Frank Einsweiler initiated a tourist campaign. Since that time Galena's business district has emphasized its historic assets in the face of suburban development. Such long-standing businesses in the downtown area, including Stair's Grocery, Sullivan's Grocery, Clingman's Pharmacy, the oldest continuously operating pharmacy in Illinois, and Hartig Drug, closed their downtown locations. Clingman's and Hartig's relocated to the outskirts of Galena, while Stair's and Sullivan's closed their doors permanently because of competition. In late 2010, Clingman's joined the Hartig's family and moved their pharmacy to Hartig's Drugs location along Highway 20.

The Country Fair in Grant Park has been an attraction that has helped increase tourist traffic to Galena as a destination. It is a craft show that attracts thousands of visitors to the area. The once boarded-up Main Street buildings have been renovated since the late 20th century. In 2010, Galena started a campaign called Vision2020, modeled after neighbor Dubuque, Iowa's Vision 2010. A committee worked on outreach efforts with the community to form a vision of what residents wanted Galena to focus on for the next decade: five major concepts have been supported. In 2010, the 32nd annual Halloween Parade attendance was estimated at 15,000. In 2011, TripAdvisor listed Galena among its top-ten "Charming Small Towns".

== Geography ==
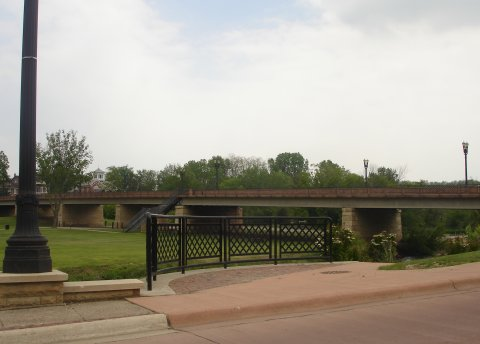
US 20/IL 84 bridge over the Galena River

Galena is located along the Galena River, which is one of many tributaries of the Mississippi River.

According to the 2021 census gazetteer files, Galena has a total area of 4.51 square miles (11.68 km^{2}), of which 4.50 square miles (11.65 km^{2}) (or 99.82%) is land and 0.01 square miles (0.03 km^{2}) (or 0.18%) is water.

Galena is located in the Driftless Area, an area that was never covered by glaciers during the recent ice ages. This area, which includes the far northwestern corner of Illinois, escaped glaciation, while almost the entire state was glaciated, nearly to its southern tip. Because it escaped glaciation, this area is known for its hills, valleys, bluffs and considerable exposed rock.

Horseshoe Mound is a hill located outside Galena that U.S. 20 winds around before entering Galena. The view from Horseshoe Mound is one of the most photographed spots in the city. It stands at 1,063 feet (324 m) above sea level.

=== Climate ===
Galena has a humid continental climate (Köppen climate classification: Dfa), with cold winters and hot summers. Annual precipitation is about 36 inches, with a distinct peak in summer.

Climate data for Galena (1991–2020 normals)
Month	Jan	Feb	Mar	Apr	May	Jun	Jul	Aug	Sep	Oct	Nov	Dec	Year
Record high °F (°C)	59 (15)	69 (21)	85 (29)	88 (31)	92 (33)	101 (38)	101 (38)	102 (39)	94 (34)	91 (33)	77 (25)	68 (20)	102 (39)
Mean daily maximum °F (°C)	26.9 (−2.8)	31.4 (−0.3)	44.5 (6.9)	57.4 (14.1)	68.9 (20.5)	78.2 (25.7)	82.0 (27.8)	80.3 (26.8)	74.1 (23.4)	60.9 (16.1)	45.6 (7.6)	32.6 (0.3)	56.9 (13.8)
Daily mean °F (°C)	18.5 (−7.5)	22.5 (−5.3)	34.5 (1.4)	46.8 (8.2)	58.2 (14.6)	68.3 (20.2)	71.9 (22.2)	69.9 (21.1)	62.3 (16.8)	50.1 (10.1)	36.7 (2.6)	24.7 (−4.1)	47.0 (8.3)
Mean daily minimum °F (°C)	10.0 (−12.2)	13.6 (−10.2)	24.4 (−4.2)	36.2 (2.3)	47.4 (8.6)	58.3 (14.6)	61.7 (16.5)	59.5 (15.3)	50.5 (10.3)	39.3 (4.1)	27.7 (−2.4)	16.8 (−8.4)	37.1 (2.8)
Record low °F (°C)	−33 (−36)	−35 (−37)	−14 (−26)	12 (−11)	21 (−6)	33 (1)	39 (4)	37 (3)	19 (−7)	10 (−12)	−2 (−19)	−29 (−34)	−35 (−37)
Average precipitation inches (mm)	1.23 (31)	1.53 (39)	2.25 (57)	3.89 (99)	4.38 (111)	6.02 (153)	4.93 (125)	4.19 (106)	3.86 (98)	3.02 (77)	2.48 (63)	1.82 (46)	39.60 (1,006)
Average snowfall inches (cm)	10.3 (26)	9.0 (23)	5.1 (13)	1.3 (3.3)	0.3 (0.76)	0.0 (0.0)	0.0 (0.0)	0.0 (0.0)	0.0 (0.0)	0.4 (1.0)	2.0 (5.1)	9.5 (24)	37.9 (96)
Average precipitation days (≥ 0.01 in)	8.5	7.6	8.9	11.0	13.0	11.8	9.3	9.8	9.1	9.4	8.4	9.2	116.0
Average snowy days (≥ 0.1 in)	7.2	5.9	3.6	0.7	0.0	0.0	0.0	0.0	0.0	0.1	1.5	5.8	24.8
Source 1: NOAA
Source 2: The Weather Channel (records)

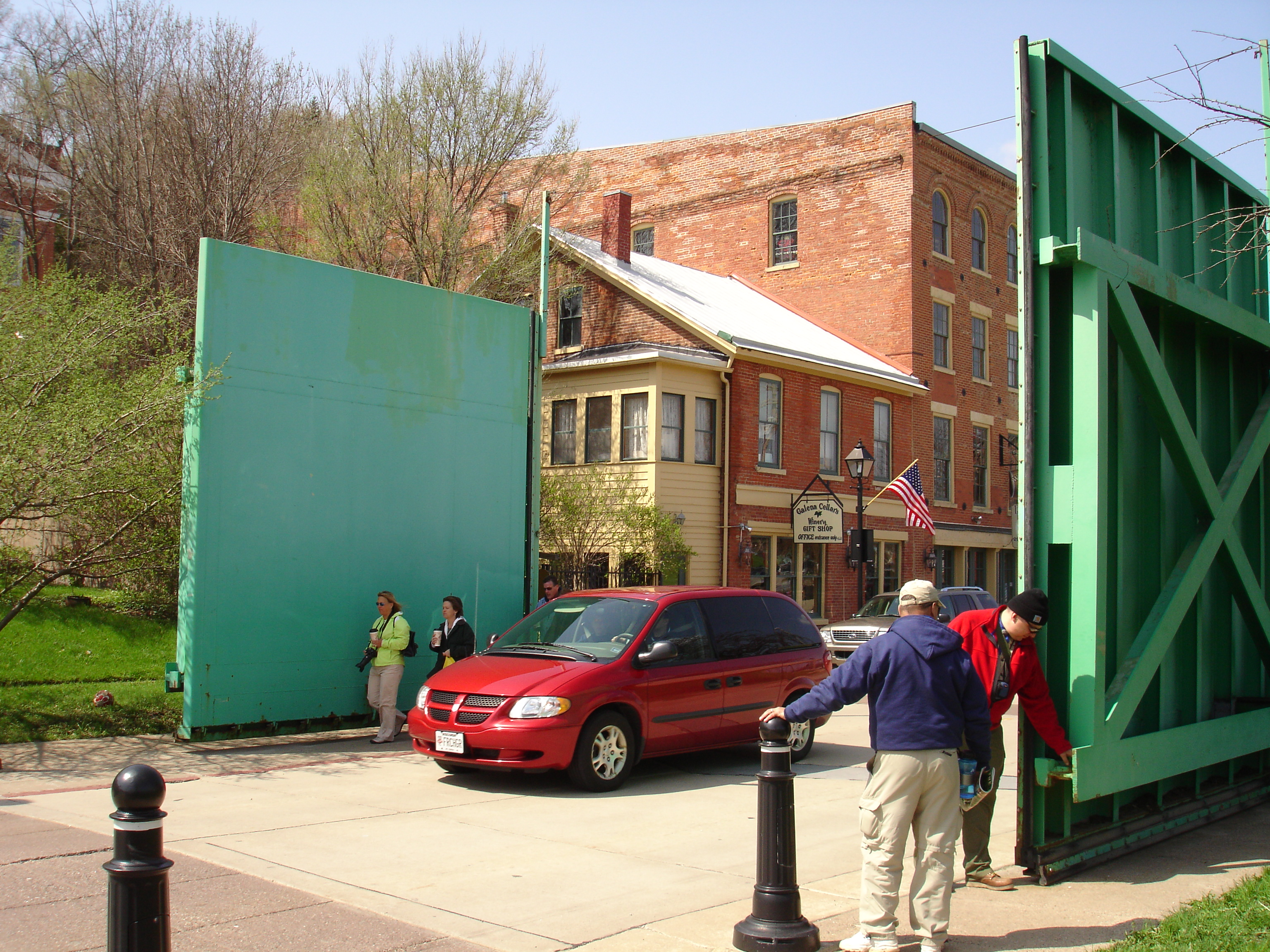
Floodgates in downtown Galena

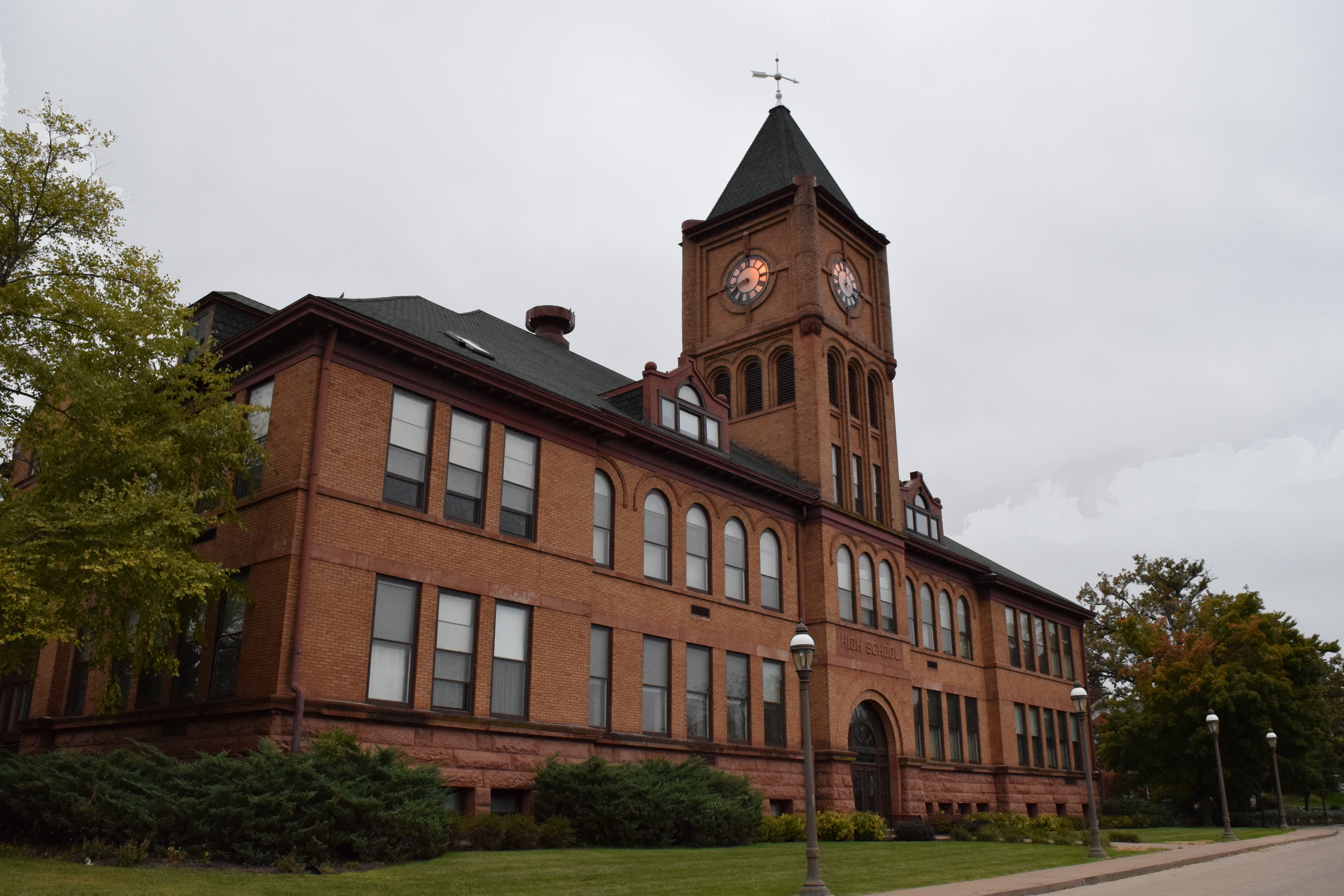
Photo of former Galena High School, now a multi-family residential condominium building

Because of the city's proximity to the Galena River, buildings have been threatened on numerous occasions by flooding. Eventually the Army Corps of Engineers built a dike to prevent city flooding. Galena's Congressman, Leo E. Allen, helped acquire funding for city floodgates which were added in 1951 to connect to the river levee system. Significant recorded floods include:

- 1828 – In Galena's first recorded flood, the water was high enough to allow steamboats to travel on city streets.
- 1937 – A flood inundated Main Street with up to five feet of water, causing serious damage to downtown buildings.
- 1972 – A storm upstream caused the flood gates to be closed but the river flooded the sewage treatment plant and backed up sanitary and storm sewers. Sandbags were placed around storm manholes to keep water from flooding the downtown with three feet of water.
- 1993 – Almost eight feet of water threatened downtown Galena, but was stopped by the city's floodgates. Late spring season rainfall led the Mississippi and Galena Rivers to their highest recorded levels.
- 2010 – On July 22, eight inches of rainfall in one night caused the river to swell to twice its usual level. The flood gates were closed, protecting downtown, but many businesses and homes reported damages to basements and lower levels. Had the flood gates not been in place, it was estimated that six feet of water would have covered Main Street. Damages were estimated between $7–8 million. President Obama declared the county a federal disaster area on August 19.
- 2011 – In a 12-hour period between July 27 and 28, Galena received between 10 and 15 inches of rain. The Galena River rose to more than twice its normal height and possibly its highest recorded level since the floodgates were erected. The Grant Park sign, built in the 19th century, was washed away and there were major damages to downtown businesses, the city's trail system and roads. Initial damage estimates were around $16 million.

== Demographics ==
Historical population
Census	Pop.	Note	%±
1850	6,004		—
1860	8,196		36.5%
1870	7,019		−14.4%
1880	6,451		−8.1%
1890	5,635		−12.6%
1900	5,005		−11.2%
1910	4,835		−3.4%
1920	4,742		−1.9%
1930	3,878		−18.2%
1940	4,126		6.4%
1950	4,648		12.7%
1960	4,410		−5.1%
1970	3,930		−10.9%
1980	3,876		−1.4%
1990	3,647		−5.9%
2000	3,460		−5.1%
2010	3,429		−0.9%
2020	3,308		−3.5%
U.S. Decennial Census

=== 2020 census ===
As of the 2020 census, Galena had a population of 3,308. There were 1,588 households and 883 families residing in the city. The median age was 50.0 years; 16.5% of residents were under the age of 18 and 30.2% were 65 years of age or older. For every 100 females, there were 92.9 males, and for every 100 females age 18 and over, there were 91.7 males age 18 and over.

The population density was 734.13 inhabitants per square mile (283.45/km^{2}). There were 2,008 housing units at an average density of 445.63 per square mile (172.06/km^{2}). Of housing units, 20.9% were vacant; the homeowner vacancy rate was 2.7% and the rental vacancy rate was 14.5%. 0.0% of residents lived in urban areas, while 100.0% lived in rural areas.

Of the city's households, 20.3% had children under the age of 18 living in them. Of all households, 39.2% were married-couple households, 21.5% were households with a male householder and no spouse or partner present, and 32.1% were households with a female householder and no spouse or partner present. About 40.4% of all households were made up of individuals, and 22.5% had someone living alone who was 65 years of age or older.

Racial composition as of the 2020 census
Race	Number	Percent
White	2,896	87.5%
Black or African American	25	0.8%
American Indian and Alaska Native	17	0.5%
Asian	21	0.6%
Native Hawaiian and Other Pacific Islander	0	0.0%
Some other race	144	4.4%
Two or more races	205	6.2%
Hispanic or Latino (of any race)	347	10.5%

=== Income and poverty ===
The median income for a household in the city was $57,558, and the median income for a family was $73,309. Males had a median income of $32,321 versus $27,975 for females. The per capita income for the city was $40,456. About 1.9% of families and 7.9% of the population were below the poverty line, including 2.0% of those under age 18 and 12.8% of those age 65 or over.

== Culture ==
Galena is the home to the Galena Art Center and the Galena Arts and Recreation Center. Turner Hall, a 19th-century building on Bench St., has been restored to serve as a performance venue and a popular wedding site. Galena is also home to several historic sites owned by the State of Illinois including the Old Market House, the Ulysses S Grant Home, and the E.B. Washburn Home. The Galena/Jo Daviess County Historical Society operates the Galena & U.S. Grant Museum and the Old Blacksmith Shop. In November of 2026, the museum moved to a new building located next to the Nelson Stillman House.

Galena hosts dozens of major events a year, including the annual Halloween Parade which draws thousands of onlookers.

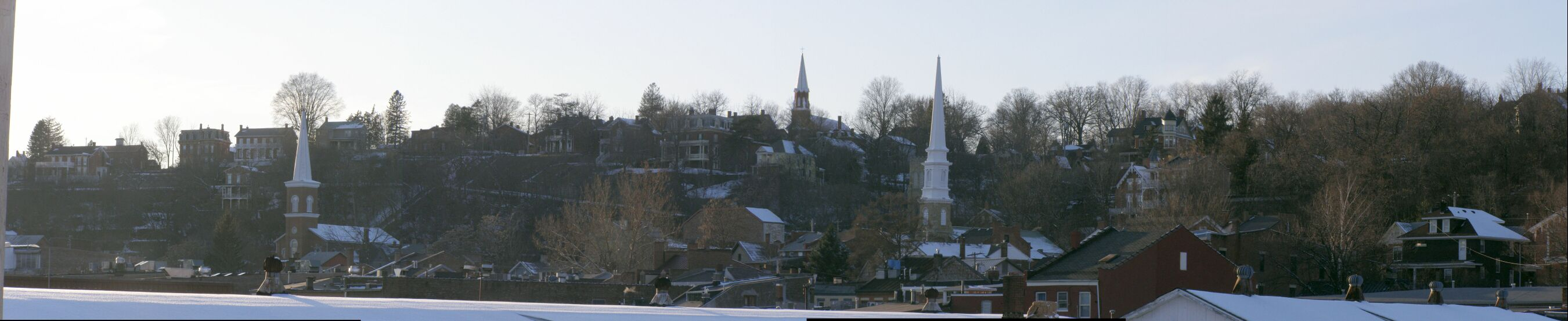
Panorama of Galena from the levee, (left) Methodist Church steeple, (center right) Lutheran Church steeple, (right) Presbyterian Church steeple

=== Tourism ===
Galena is a popular tourist destination hosting well over one million visitors each year. Galena is also popular with Chicagoans, many of whom keep second homes in the area. Galena is largely popular as a result of its historic walkable urbanism, a rarity among American cities.

=== Cityscape ===
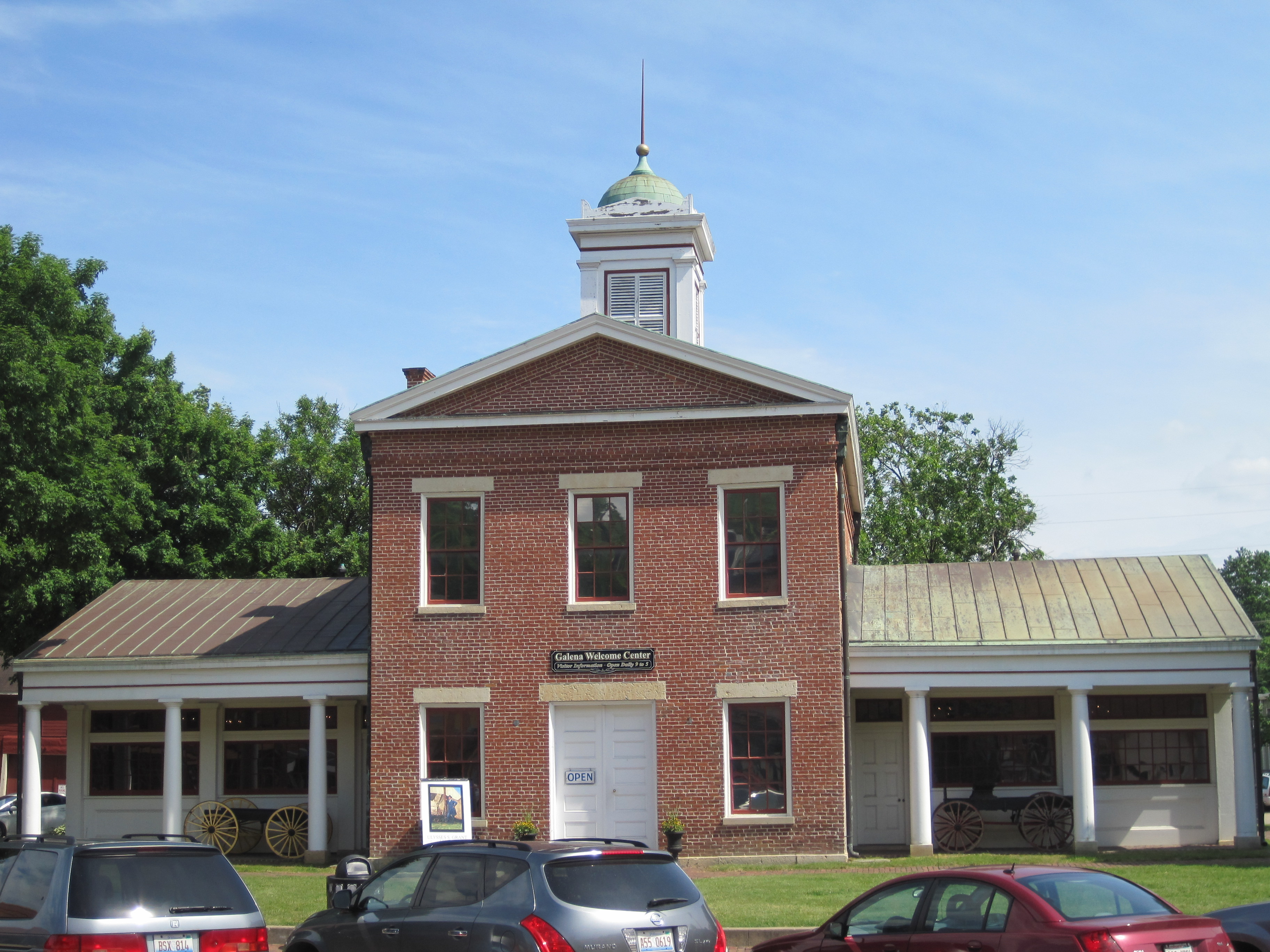
The Old Market House State Historic Site

85 percent of the structures in Galena are within the Galena Historic District, which is listed on the National Register of Historic Places and greatly contributes to the city's popularity. The Old Market House State Historic Site, built in 1845, is a museum of local social history. Main Street was one of the first in the state to require architectural review of exterior building modifications. Zoning restrictions against wood-structure buildings contributed to the prevalence of brick buildings. All along Main Street the architectural style and historic feel create a unique atmosphere. Efforts to improve the existing infrastructure while preserving the character of this neighborhood continued in 2003 with the adoption of a comprehensive plan. The plan outlines details on burying utilities, replacing parking with bike lanes and several beautification initiatives. This historic district has garnered the attention of dozens of volunteer groups who work to beautify and increase the utility of the area. As the premier street in the second most popular tourist destination in Illinois those planning Main Street must be focused on balancing new developments along the waterway, and the transition to commercial stores with the charm provided by natural areas and long standing businesses. Trolley Cars follow parade routes north and south on Main Street and connect shopping to parks and wineries. The town is home to several wineries in the Upper Mississippi River Valley AVA. In the area, there are 450 vineyards and 100 wineries available to visit. Main Street in downtown Galena has a large number of specialty shops, restaurants, a brewery, and multiple wineries.

Galena's Saint Michael's Church was founded by the pioneer priest Father Samuel Mazzuchelli. The church is named after one of the three Archangels. Opened in 1855, the downtown DeSoto House Hotel is the oldest operating hotel in Illinois. Rooms 209 and 211 of the hotel were used as Ulysses S. Grant's campaign headquarters during his presidential campaign. Future president Abraham Lincoln gave a speech from the hotel's Main Street balcony on July 23, 1856, supporting John Fremont's bid for presidency. Two years later, on July 25, 1858, Senator Stephen Douglas spoke from the same balcony. Other famous guests include Theodore Roosevelt, Mark Twain, Susan B. Anthony, Ralph Waldo Emerson, Horace Greeley, Frances Willard, Elizabeth Cady Stanton, Robert E. Lee, Chief Black Hawk, Millard Fillmore, and Zachary Taylor. General Winfield Scott Hancock stayed in Room 223 for an extended period of time. There are also several resorts and golf courses in the Galena area. In celebration of the 2018 Illinois Bicentennial, Galena Main Street was selected as one of the Illinois 200 Great Places by the American Institute of Architects Illinois component (AIA Illinois) and was recognized by USA Today Travel magazine, as one of AIA Illinois' selections for Illinois 25 Must See Places.

=== Education ===
John O. Hancock opened the first school in September 1826. The Galena Academy followed in 1832. Galena is home to Galena High School.

== Notable people ==
=== The nine generals ===
Galena was the home to nine Civil War generals. Foremost among these is Ulysses S. Grant, who first came to Galena with his wife Julia and children in 1860 to work in the family tannery and leather-good shop. A veteran of the Mexican–American War, Grant was called upon to train a regiment of volunteers raised in Galena when the Civil War broke out in 1861. Through the support of local congressman Elihu B. Washburne, Grant became Galena's first general when promoted by Abraham Lincoln on May 17, 1861. Washburne later served a brief stint as Grant's Secretary of State and then as Minister to France. Victories at Missionary Ridge and Lookout Mountain prompted Lincoln to promote Grant to lieutenant general on March 3, 1864, giving him command of all Union Armies.

Grant returned victorious to Galena in 1865 and the citizens gave him an Italianate two-story brick house, today recognized as the Ulysses S. Grant Home State Historic Site. He was selected as the candidate of the Republican Party for the 1868 presidential election. Grant was elected and served two four-year terms. He did not return to Galena.

Augustus Louis Chetlain, who captained the regiment that Grant trained, was later brevetted to major general. Jeweler John E. Smith, who raised the 45th Illinois Volunteer Infantry Regiment, was also brevetted a major general. Ely S. Parker drafted the Appomattox surrender terms of the Confederacy and was the only Native American general of the Union. President Grant appointed him Commissioner of Indian Affairs in 1869. John Aaron Rawlins, who served a term as city attorney in 1857, was brevetted in 1865 and briefly served as Grant's Secretary of War. Brevetted brigadier general John C. Smith later served as Illinois Treasurer, Lieutenant Governor, and Grand Master of the state Masonic order. Gunsmith Jasper A. Maltby was promoted to brigadier general at the Siege of Vicksburg. John Duerr was brevetted in 1865, and later was a successful merchant in Monticello, Iowa. William R. Rowley was brevetted in 1865, and later became a county judge.

== Gallery ==
Galena cityscape and notable people
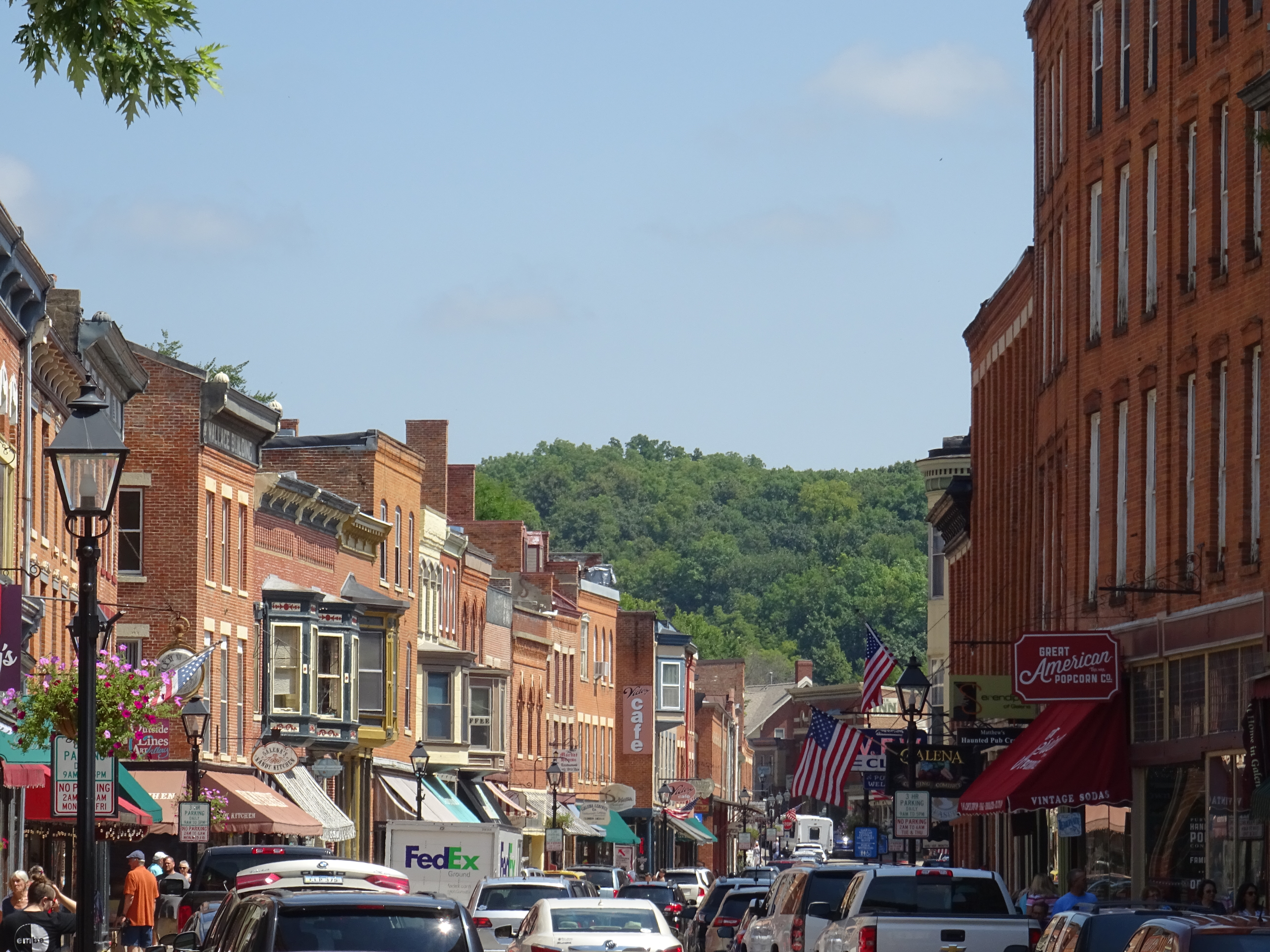
Looking east on Main Street

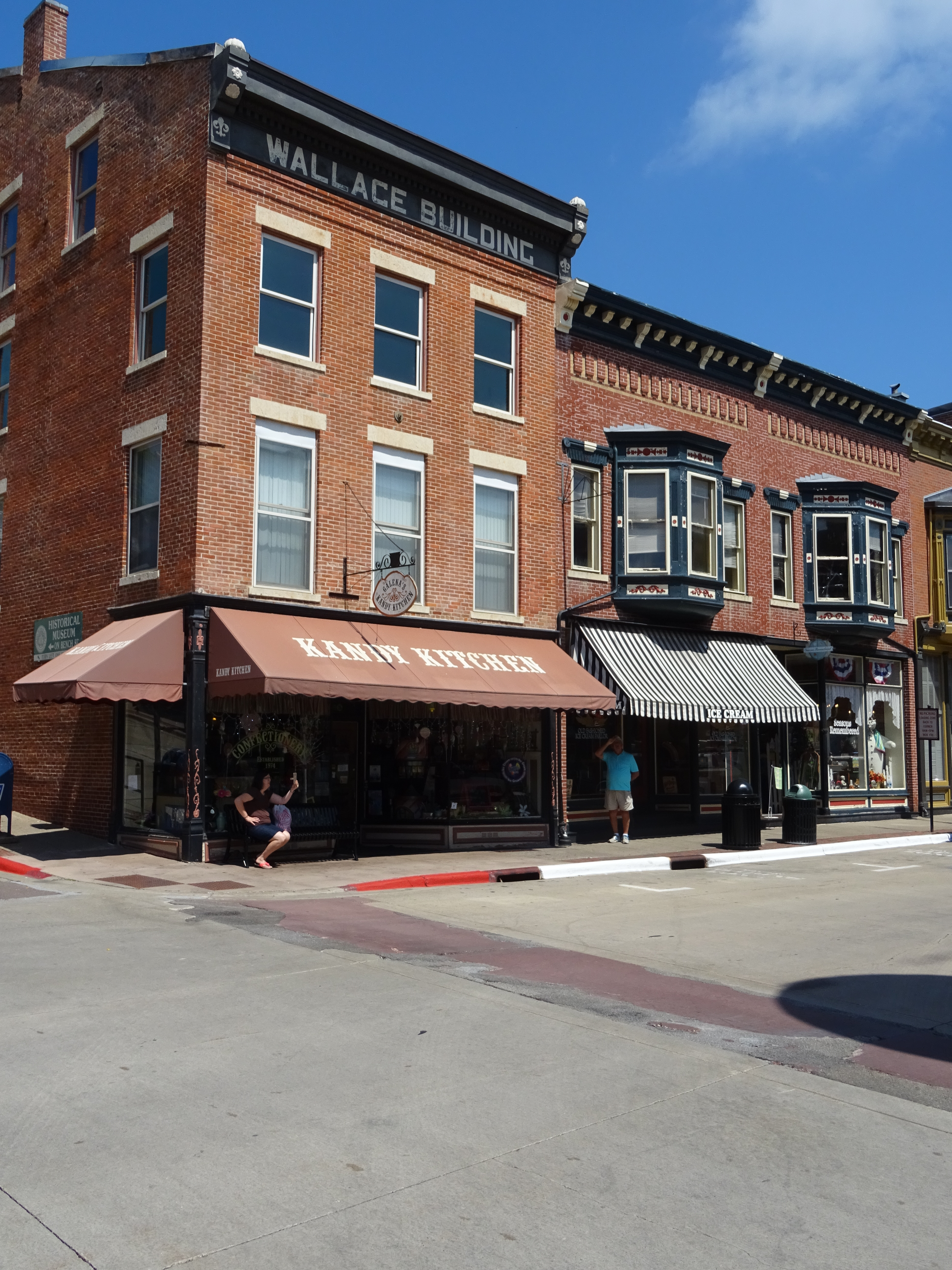
Galena Kandy Kitchen, corner of North Main Street and Hill Street

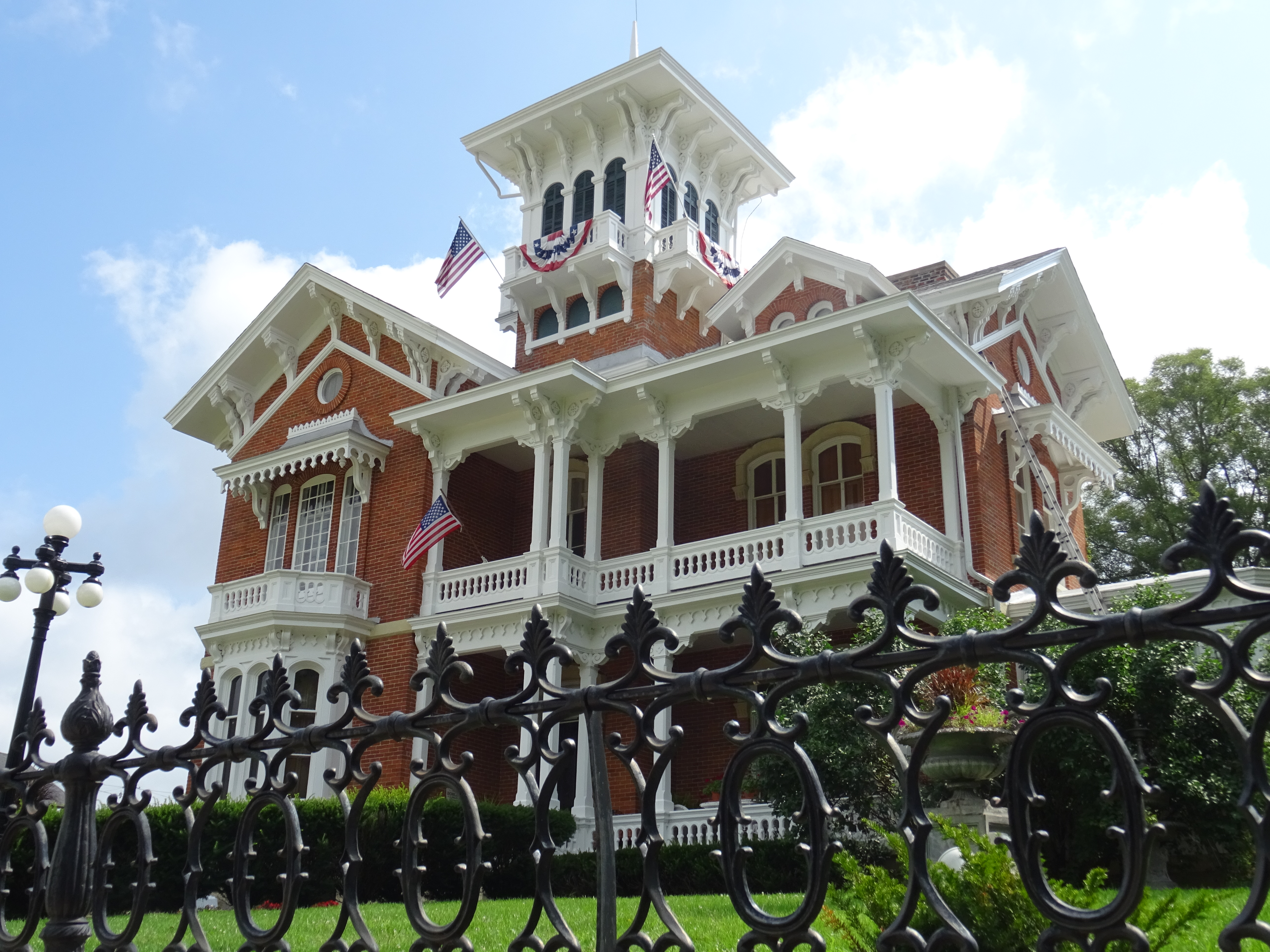
Belvedere Mansion is the finest and largest mansion in Galena. Built in 1857 for Joseph Russell Jones, influential Civil War-era merchant.

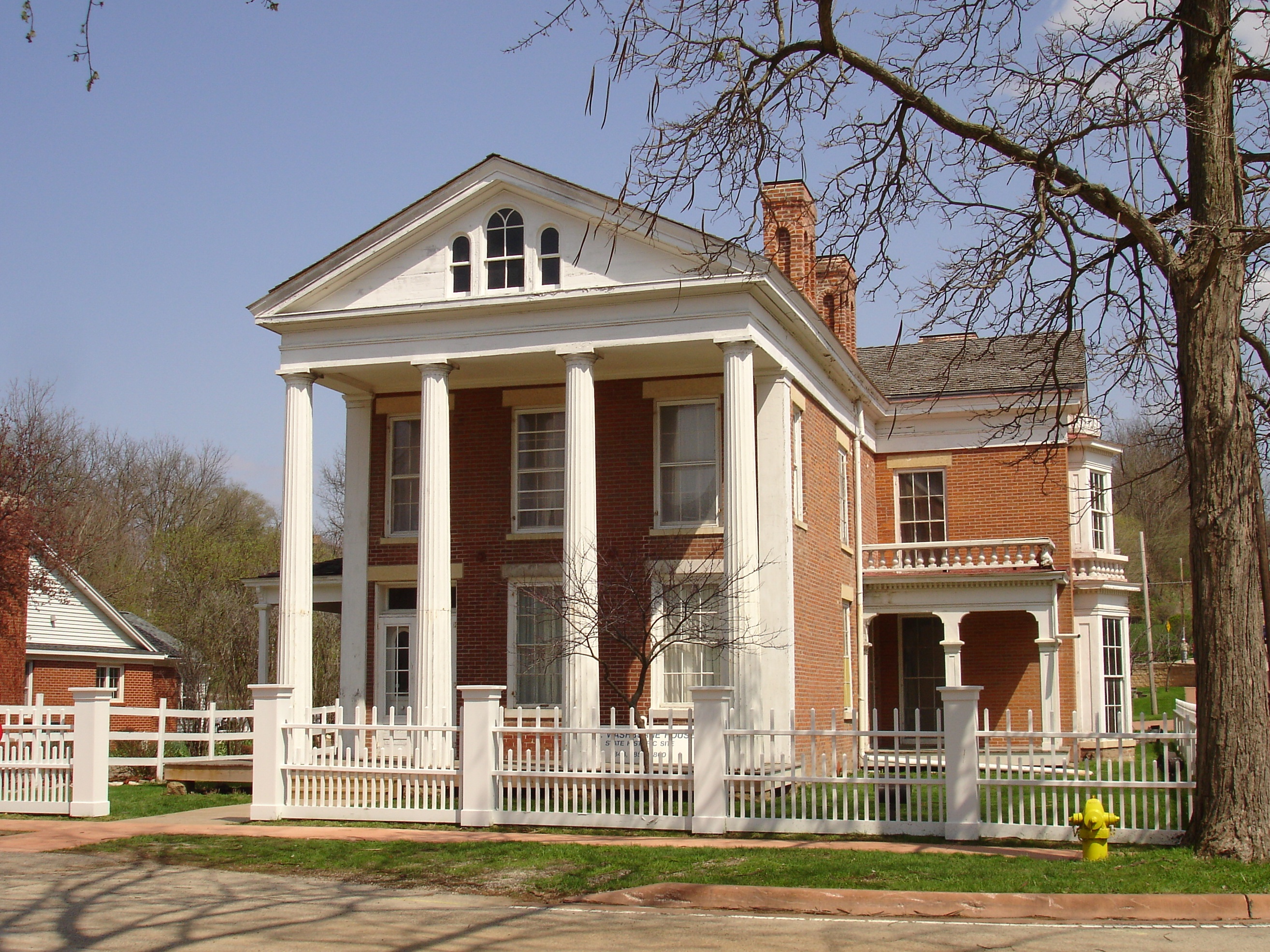
Elihu Benjamin Washburne House, on Third Street

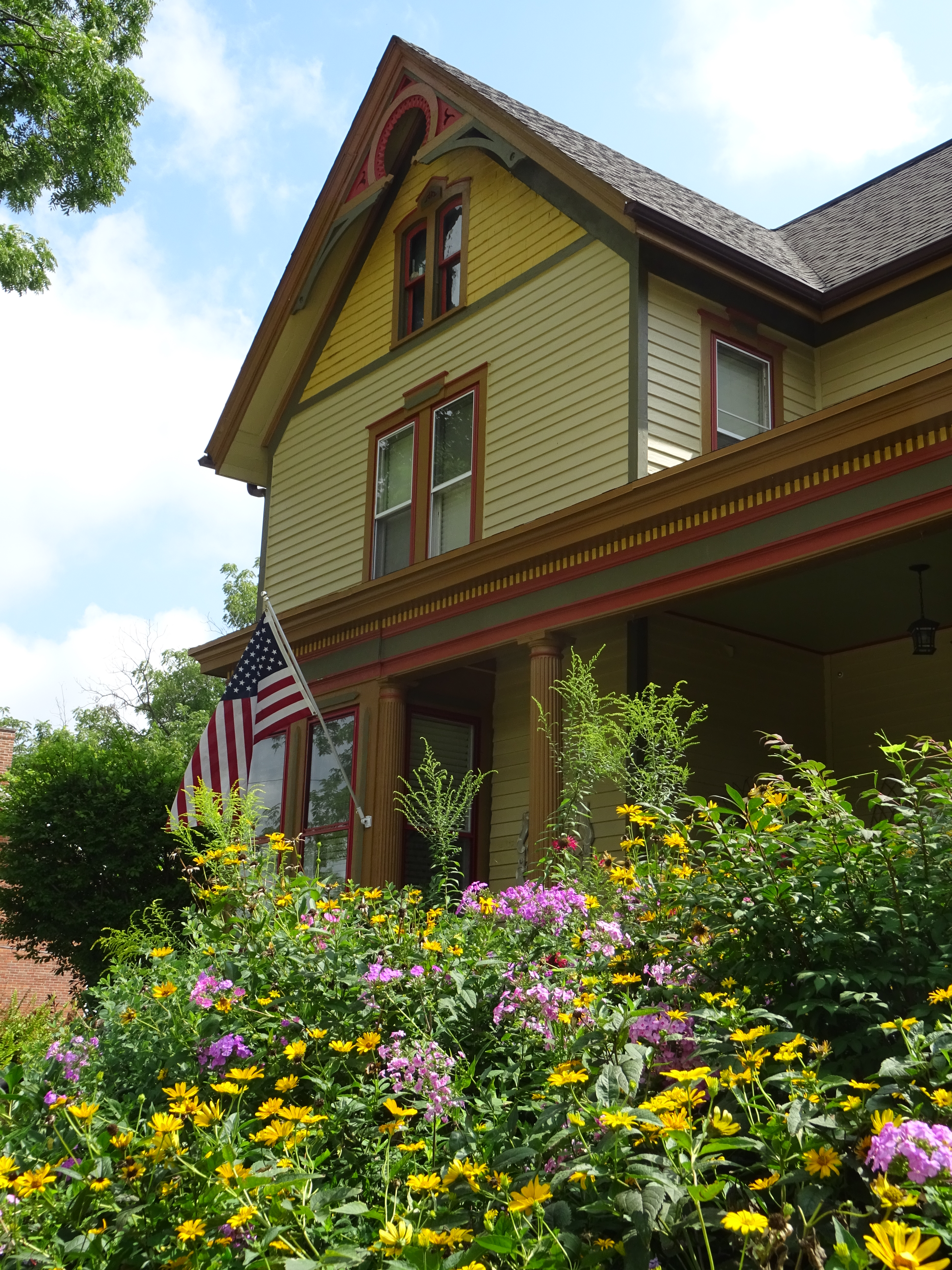
A home in Galena

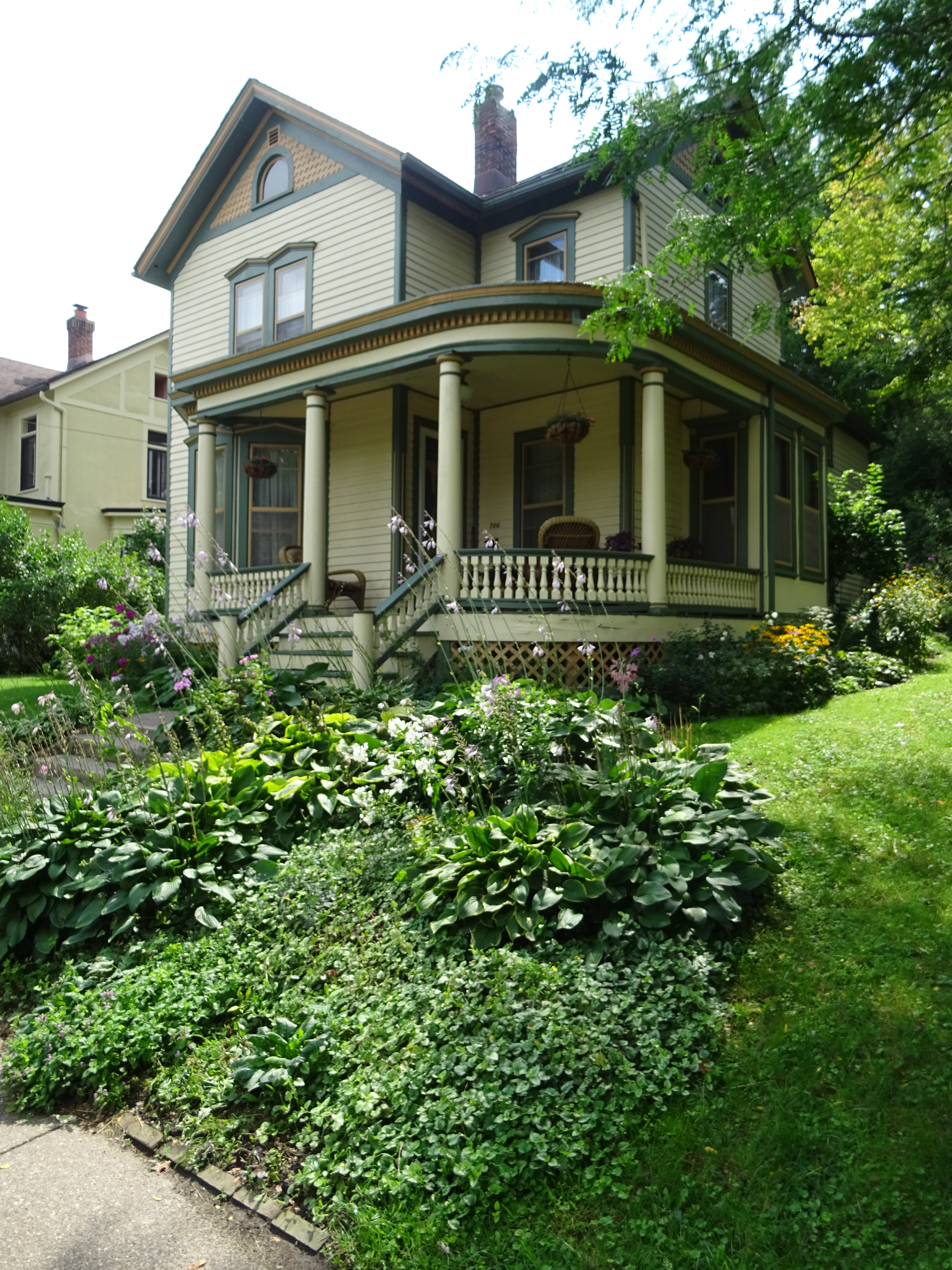
A home in Galena

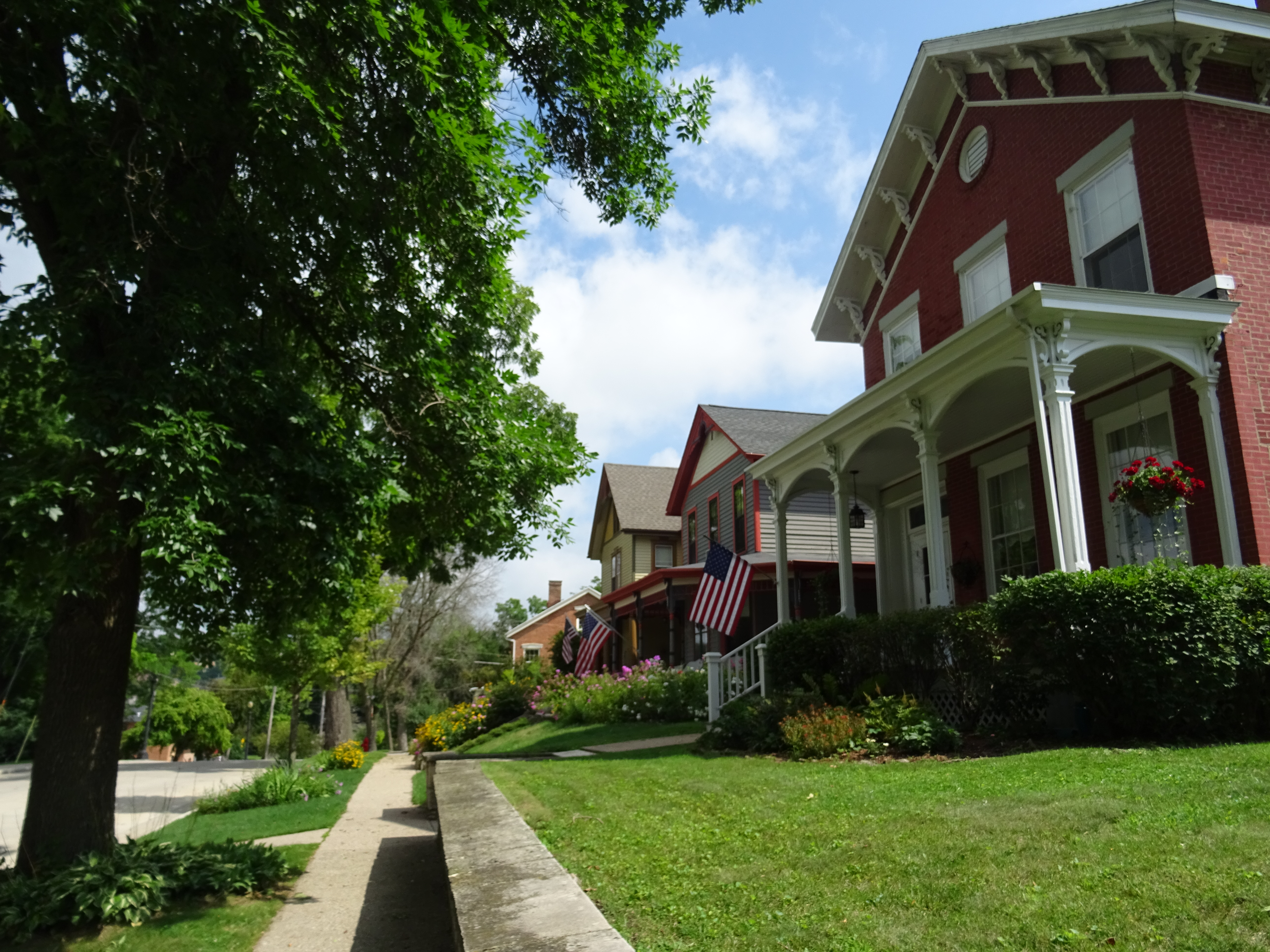
Homes along Park Avenue

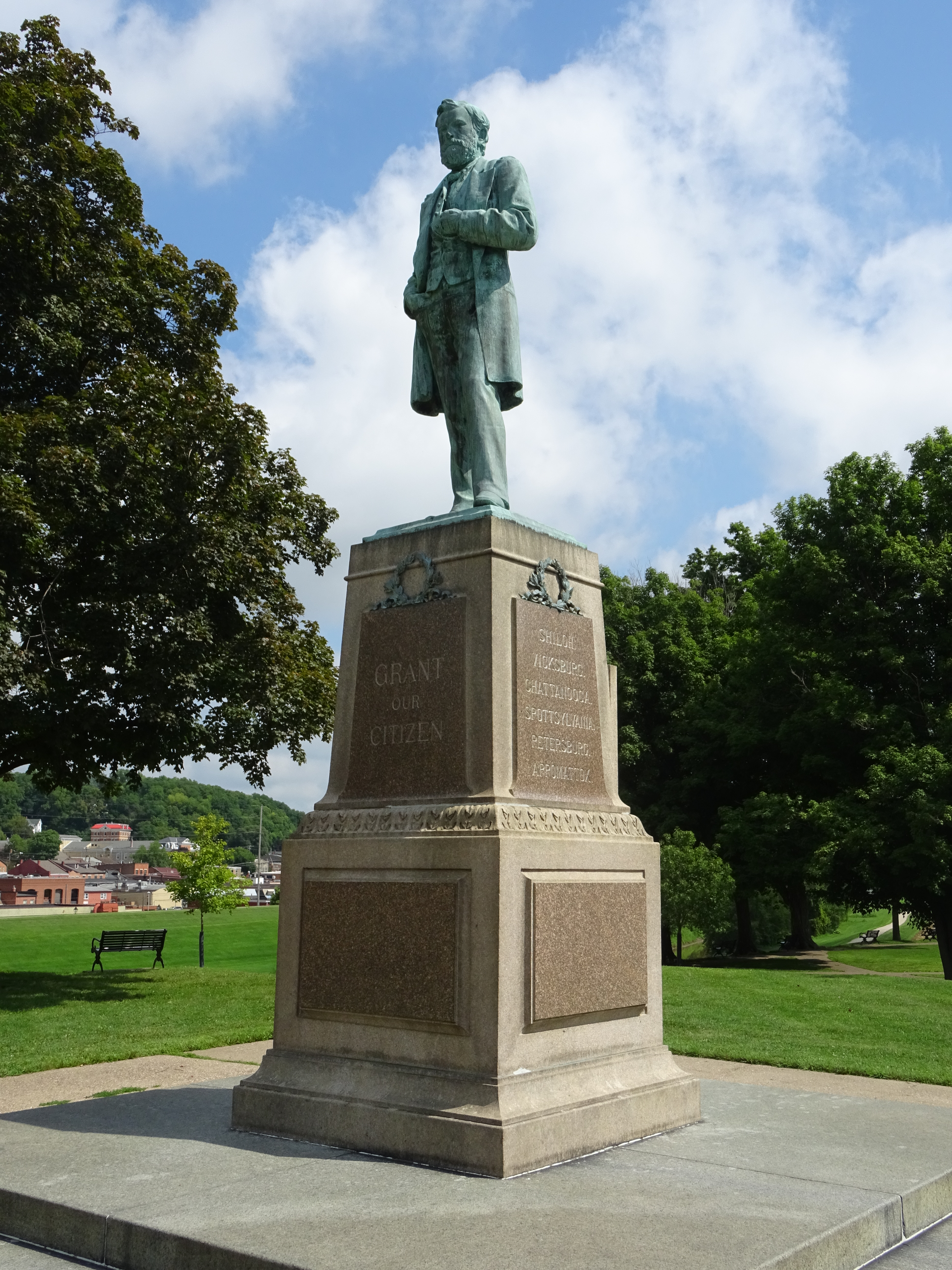
Ulysses S. Grant statue in Grant Park

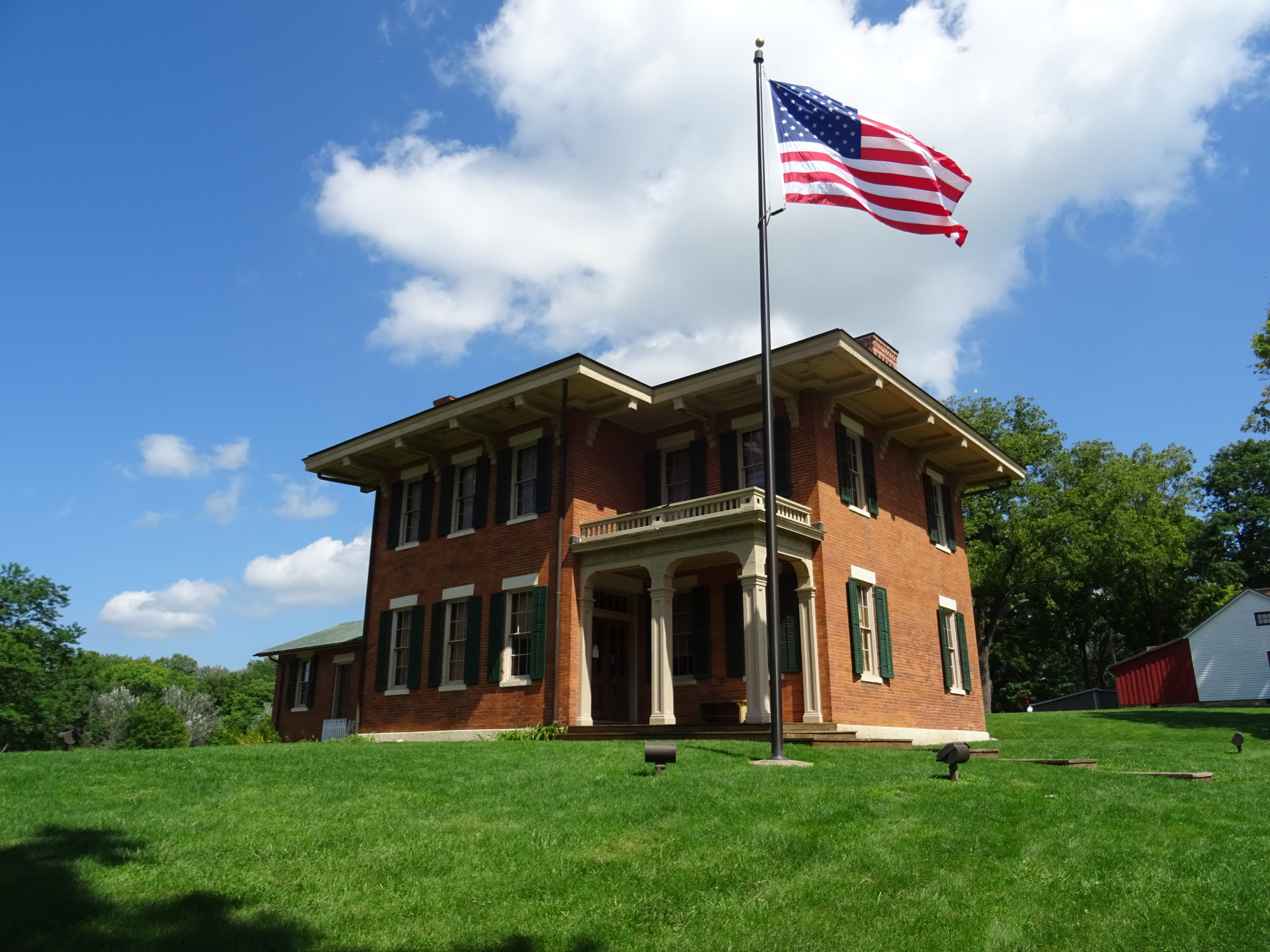
Ulysses S. Grant Home, designed by William Dennison and constructed in 1859

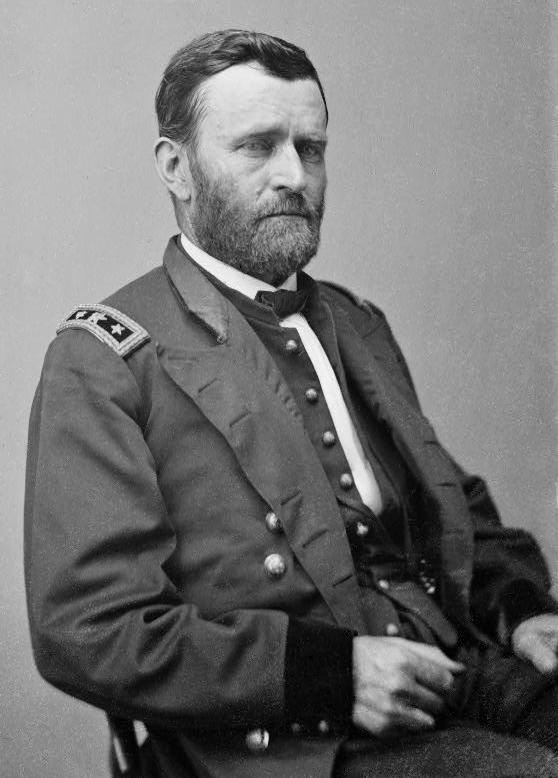
In April 1860, Grant (1822−1885) and his family moved to Galena, accepting a position in his father's leather goods business.

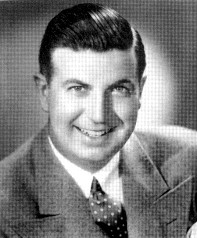
Don McNeill (1907−1996) was an American radio personality, born in Galena.

== See also ==
- Chestnut Mountain
- The Galena Territory

== Bibliography ==
- The History of Jo Daviess County, Illinois. Chicago: H. F. Kett & Co. 1878.
- Walthall, John H. (1981). Galena and Aboriginal Trade in Eastern North America. Springfield, Illinois: Illinois State Museum. p. 3. ISBN 0-89792-090-2.
