= Market house =

Historic building used as a marketplace

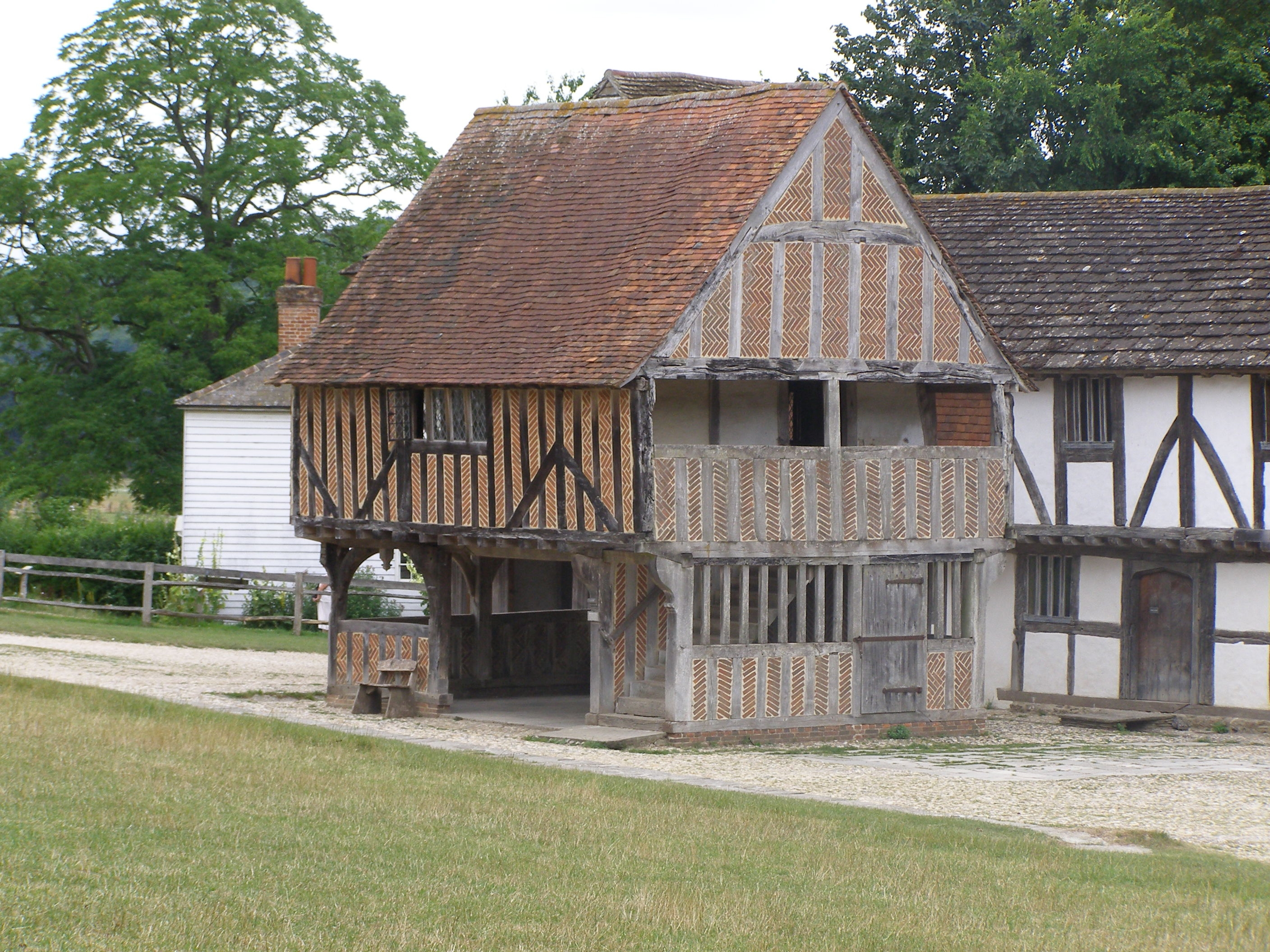
Market hall of the 1620s originally from Titchfield, Hampshire, England, now re-erected at the Weald and Downland Open Air Museum, Sussex

A market house or market hall is a covered space historically used as a marketplace to exchange goods and services such as provisions or livestock, sometimes combined with spaces for public or civic functions on the upper floors and often with a jail or lockup in the cellar or basement floor. Market houses usually included an arcade to protect traders and their goods from the elements while maintaining private access to most of the building.

After this style of market building developed in British market towns, it spread to colonial territories of Great Britain, including Ireland and New England in America. A market house is typically located on a market square, quay or wharf in a central accessible area for the ease of transit of goods and people.

More contemporary market halls are often similar to food halls.

== Gallery ==
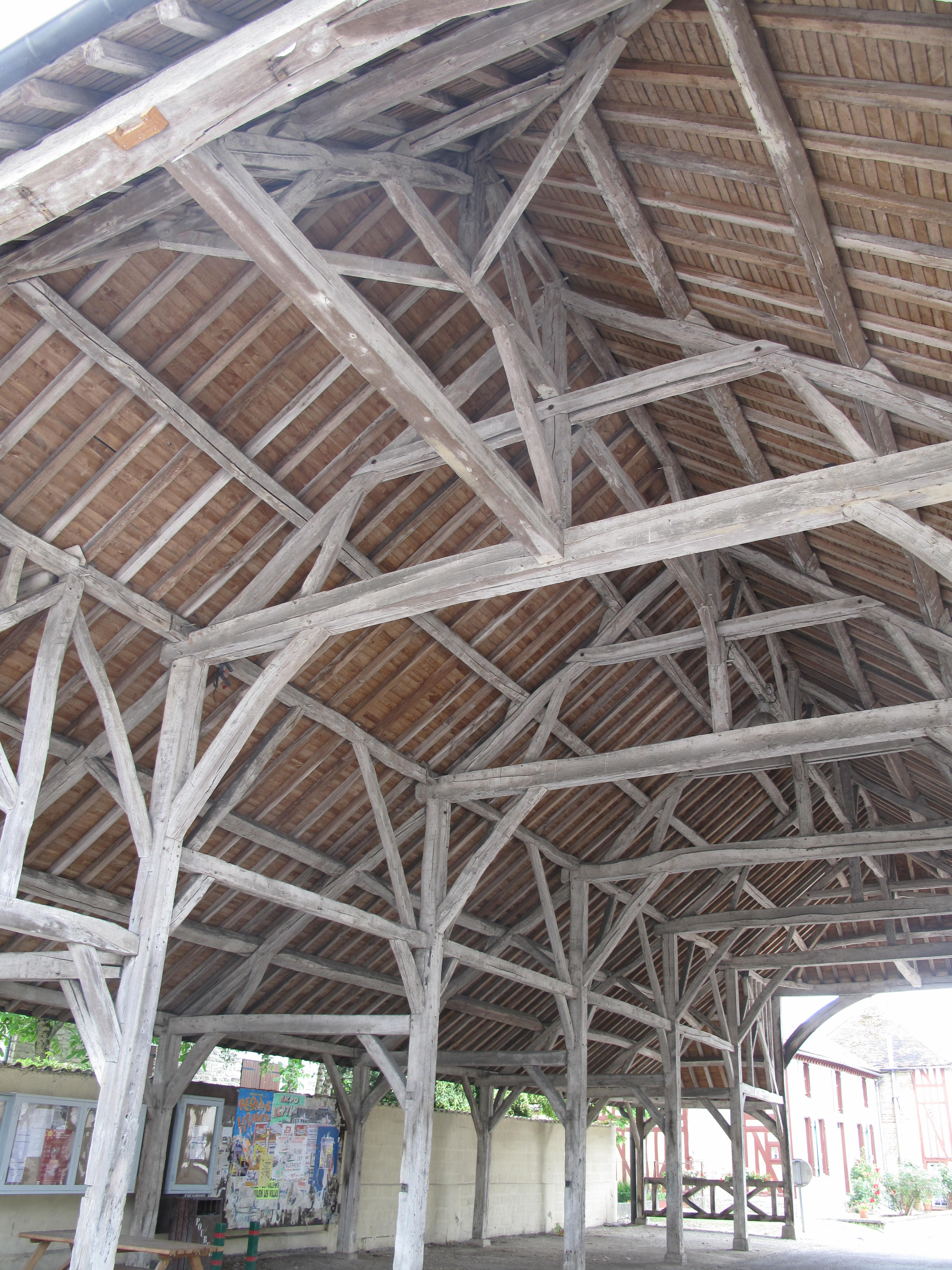
Carpentry of the market hall of Lesmont (Aube, France)

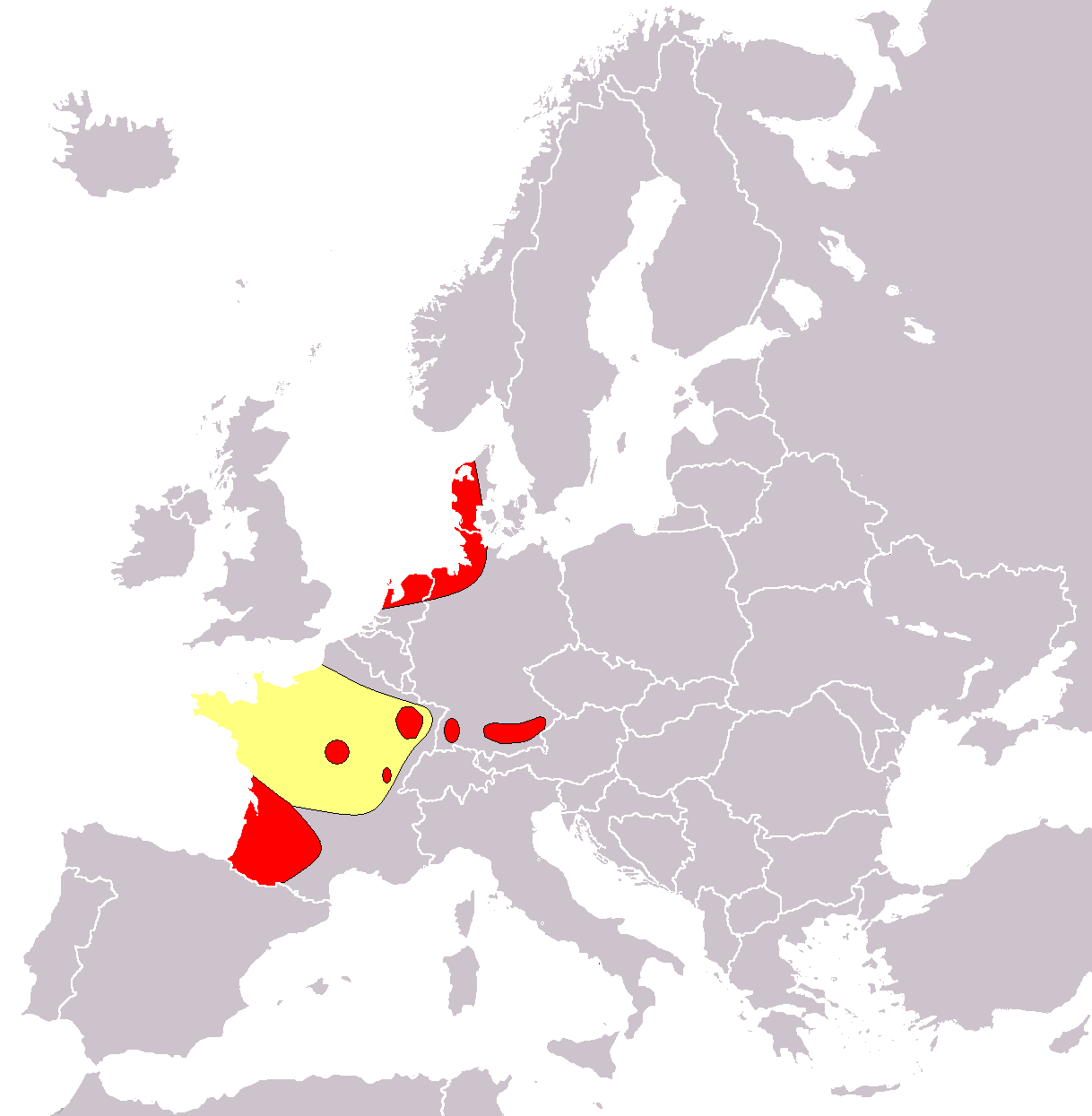
Geographical distribution of still existing European market-halls as of 2010

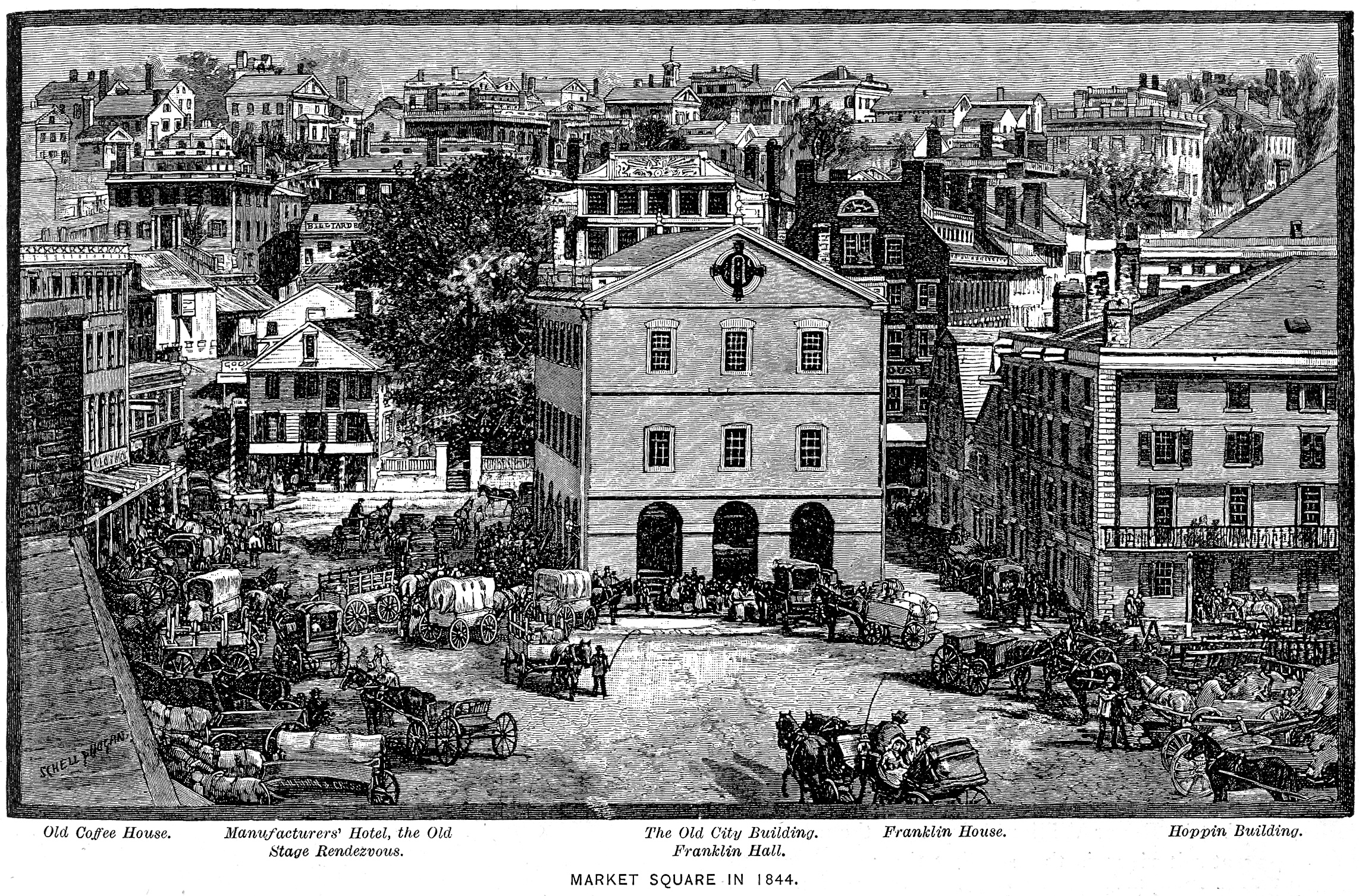
Market House in Providence, Rhode Island, U.S.

== See also ==
- General store
- Market (place)
- Market hall and Market hall (disambiguation)
- Market town
- Market square
- Moot hall
- Market halls in Berlin
- Market houses in Northern Ireland
- Market houses in the Republic of Ireland
- Stock exchange
- Tholsel (Ireland) and Tolbooth (Scotland)
