= Hartig Drug =

American retail store chain

Hartig Drug Company
- Industry: Retail
- Founded: 1904; 122 years ago Dubuque, Iowa, U.S.
- Founder: AJ Hartig
- Headquarters: 703 Main Street; Dubuque, Iowa, U.S.
- Areas served: Iowa, Illinois, and Wisconsin
- Key people: Richard J. Hartig (Owner, Chairman); Keith Bibelhausen (CEO); John Meyer (President); Charles Hartig (Vice-President, General Counsel)
- Website: hartigdrug.com

Hartig Drug Stores is a chain of pharmacy/retail stores based out of Dubuque, Iowa. The company provides pharmacy services not only to the general public, but to area institutions as well. Along with this pharmacy focus, Hartig Drug stores offer convenience retail items. The company has operated for over 100 years; currently, it is the second-oldest family-run pharmacy chain in the United States.

== History ==
Hartig Drug was founded in 1904 by A.J Hartig, upon graduation from pharmacy school at Northwestern University. Originally created in the likeness of the many drug stores prevalent in the Midwest at the time, it has since grown into regional chain of mixed retail stores and pharmacies.

The drug chain has a long history of progressive retail practices. In 1941, Hartig Drug opened the first Self-service drug store in Iowa, drawing more than 10,000 customers in its first two days of operation. It was also one of the first stores to hire women as pharmacists and store managers.

=== USA Drug affiliation ===
In 1999, Hartig Drug entered into a partnership with national retailer USA Drug as a supplier of generic-brand items. At the same time, some Hartig Drug stores were renamed "Hartig USA Drug" in recognition of the cooperative association. Although this association continues, Hartig Drug is not a franchise of USA Drug.

=== Current ownership ===
Hartig Drug has been owned by the same family since its creation in 1904. The current owner and chairman of the board is Richard J. Hartig. In 2001, Hartig hired Keith Bibelhausen as the first non-family president of the drug chain. In 2007, the store reported an employment of around 400 persons.

== Location ==
Hartig Drug stores can be found in 21 different locations throughout eastern Iowa, northwest Illinois, and southwest Wisconsin.

Hartig Drug stores are generally characterized by a mix between retail store and pharmacy, similar to national chains like Walgreens. Stores offer items including Hallmark cards, gifts, sports themed merchandise, snack foods, beverages, photographic printing, beauty supplies and non-prescription medications (along with prescription drugs at the pharmacy counter).

== National associations ==
Hartig Drug is a member of the National Community Pharmacists Association.
