= Market halls in Berlin =

- Friedrich Hitzig 1867 markethall, Zirkus 1, Berlin
  - de:Markthallen in Berlin#Die erste Markthalle in Berlin
  - de:Großes Schauspielhaus#Geschichte

By the year 1900, there were 14 market halls (or market houses) in Berlin.

Name	Location	Built (date)	Sales area (in m^{2}) / Number of stands	Remarks	Image
I, Zentralmarkthalle Berlin (I and II)	Berlin-Mitte, on both sides of Kaiser-Wilhelm-Straße (now Karl-Liebknecht-Straße) near Alexanderplatz	1884–1886 and –1893	16.079/1336; 13.281/776	The Central Market Hall I (as it was first called) was the first shopping center built according to the municipal building program. It had ice-cold storage rooms in the cellar area and its own railway connection to deliver goods. Until 1893, the extension of the central market hall was built on the opposite side of the street (Central Market Hall Ia or II). The Central Market Hall parts survived the First World War and the economic crisis to a large extent without damage, only in 1944 it was ruined. The Hall I, rebuilt in need of help, helped provide the East Berlin population. Hall Ia was dismantled. In the 1960s the first market hall was also destroyed. Some parts were integrated into a new building at the same place.	More pictures
II, Lindenhalle	Friedrichstadt, Berlin-Mitte, Lindenstraße 97/98 / Friedrichstraße 18	1884–1886	9114/746	This market hall is located north of the Mehringplatz and has access from the Friedrichstraße and the Lindenstraße. All buildings along with the market hall fell into ruins at the end of the Second World War. While the residential buildings were replaced by new ones, the market hall was only rebuilt in 1962 and 1965 in its original form but with new materials. Until 2010 it served as the Berlin Flower Market.	Schnittdarstellung der Markthalle II
III, Zimmerhalle	Friedrichstadt, Berlin-Mitte, Zimmerstraße 90/91	1884–1886	4843/409	In 1910, it was closed down as a market place due to a decline in the number of retailers and leased to the catering firm Hoffmann & Retschlag. In 1942, the former harket hall also served as an internment station for arrested Jews. After 1945, the building was converted into a business building.	Erhaltenes Fassadenelement
IV	Dorotheenstadt, Berlin-Mitte, Reichstagufer corner of Dorotheenstraße	1884–1886	3778/364	The hall had a tunnel entrance to neighboring buildings. It was closed as a market hall in 1913. Parts were integrated into the new post office building at the same place.	
V	Berlin-Tiergarten, Magdeburger Platz	1886–1887	2538/231	The hall was damaged in the Second World War, and was finally dismantled in 1956.	Seitenfassade Markthalle V
VI, Ackerhalle	Berlin-Mitte, Invalidenstraße corner of Ackerstraße	1886–1888	3546/344		More pictures
VII	Berlin-Kreuzberg, Dresdner Straße / Legiendamm	1887–1888	4700/410		
VIII	Berlin-Friedrichshain, Andreasstraße / Krautstraße	1886–1 May 1888	5070/532		
IX, Eisenbahnhalle „Markthalle Neun	Berlin-Kreuzberg, Pücklerstraße 34 / Eisenbahnstraße 42/43	?–1891	3296/300		Markthalle IX
X, Arminiushalle from 2010 Zunfthalle, now again Arminiushalle	Berlin-Moabit, Arminiusstraße/Bremer Straße/Bugenhagenstraße/Jonasstraße	1890–1891	4810/425	The only one-storey market hall, also known as the Moabiter Hall, has been used without any major interruptions since its opening.	More pictures
XI, Marheinekehalle	Berlin-Kreuzberg, Zossener Straße / Bergmannstraße	1891–15 March 1892	2808/278	Although severely damaged during the Second World War, in the summer of 1945 a new market activity began in the cellar. The upper surface served as a depot of a rubble railway until 1950.	Fassadenzeichnung zum Marheinekeplatz Halle XI anno 2017
XII	Berlin-Gesundbrunnen, Grüntaler Straße / Badstraße 16a	1890–1892	4198/273	After a dramatic decline in the number of retailers (below 50), and due to inefficiency, the Berlin administration closed the hall in 1898.	Markthalle XII, Fassade
XIII	Berlin-Prenzlauer Berg, main entrance Wörther Straße 45	1890–1892	5095/393	The indoor market was surrounded by Franseckystraße (north), Treskowstraße (east), Wörtherstraße (south) and Schönhauser Allee (west). After the number of leased market stalls had declined to around 100 by 1910, market hall was closed.	Markthalle XIII, Fassade
XIV	Berlin-Gesundbrunnen, Dalldorfer Straße 21/22 (from 1919 Schönwalder Straße 19) east of the Wedding-Platz	1890–1892	4057/352	In 1910 this market hall is listed in the address book on Dalldorfer Straße, owned by the City of Berlin.	Hauptfassade der Markthalle XIV um 1892
