= City Market (Davenport, Iowa) =

- U.S. National Register of Historic Places
- U.S. Historic district – Contributing property
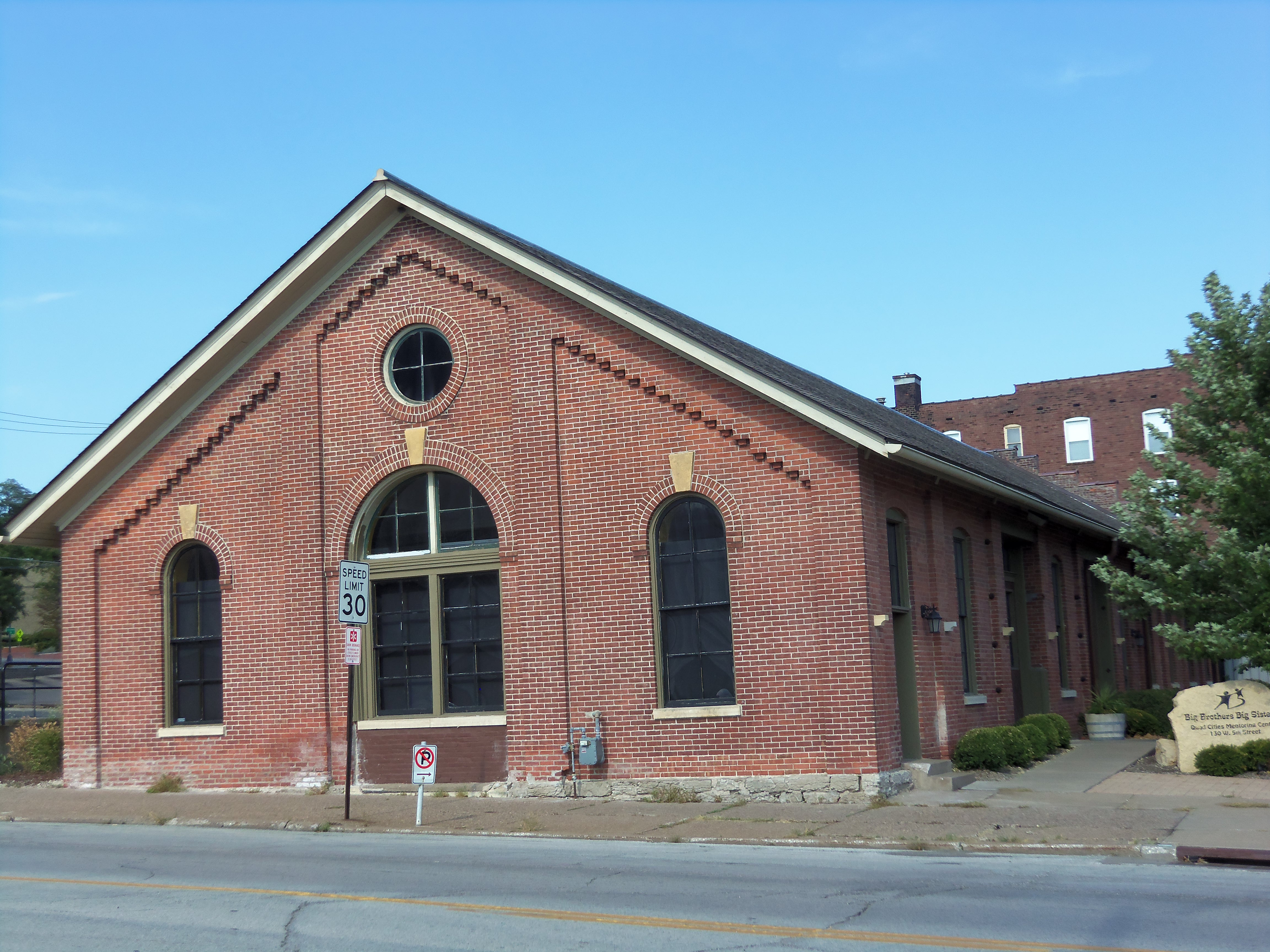

- Location within Iowa Location within the United States
- Location: 120 W. 5th Street; Davenport, Iowa
- Coordinates: 41°31′30″N 90°34′31″W
- Built: 1872
- Architect: Thomas W. McClelland
- Architectural style: Romanesque Revival
- Part of: Davenport Downtown Commercial Historic District (ID100005546)
- MPS: Davenport MRA
- NRHP reference No.: 84001329
- Added to NRHP: April 5, 1984

City Market is a historic building located in downtown Davenport, Iowa, United States. It was individually listed on the National Register of Historic Places in 1984. In 2020 it was included as a contributing property in the Davenport Downtown Commercial Historic District.

== History ==
The idea behind the City Market was to bring the city's merchants and their goods together in a single location. However, the merchants had to vacate their individual stores in order to occupy a stall in the City Market. To that end the city hired Thomas W. McClelland to build the public market on Fifth Street in 1872. The facility was damaged in a fire in 1873, and some of the walls still show burn marks.

The market idea, however, did not last long because there was little interest from merchants. The west end of the building, whose address is 130 West Fifth Street, became the police station in 1877. By 1886 the east end of the building, 120 W. Fifth Street, was occupied by the Armory Co. B. The Armory moved out by 1892 and that section of the building became the Bridewell House of Detention. When the Scott County Jail opened in 1898 this facility became a women's jail. It was overseen by a police matron and was used to register prostitutes for vice taxation. By 1920 the address, 120 W. Fifth (or 122 W. Fifth Street as it was sometimes listed), was no longer being used. It could be that the east section of the building was torn down at this time. At any rate, the east section no longer exists. Starting in 1925 the police department and the city's ambulance service started sharing the building starting in 1925. Bridewell House of Detention and Patrol Station No. 1 remained until about 1940 and the ambulance service left sometime in the 1940s. The city's Parking Division was also headquartered here.

The building was vacant for a number of years. In 2008, Big Brothers Big Sisters of the Mississippi Valley moved into the building. They raised $650,000 to renovate the building and teamed with the Tri-City Building Trades Council who used the renovation as an educational project.

== Architecture ==
The City Market is a single-story, brick building constructed on a stone foundation. The structure is rectangular in shape and is topped by a gable roof, which faces Main Street. It contains a mixture of Romanesque Revival and Greek Revival elements. The Romanesque may be found in the rounded arches and decorative brickwork on the façade fronting Main Street. It also features brick pilasters and a stepped frieze that organizes the facade into three bays.

The north and south elevations are more functional and less decorative. Both elevations contain windows, garage doors, and a pedestrian entrance. Window openings feature segmentally arched headers, stone sills, and double-hung windows with 6/6 light configurations. The pedestrian entrances are similar in form, while the garage doors have flat span lintels, with glass transoms above the door. As mentioned above, the eastern end of the original building has been removed. The corbiestep parapet wall of the roofline and ghost marks indicate the existence of the former space.
