= USA Drug =

American Drug Store Chain

- Type: Private
- Founded: 1984
- Defunct: 2012
- Fate: acquired by Walgreens; shut down September 15, 2012
- Headquarters: Pine Bluff, Arkansas
- Products: Retail-Pharmacy
- Website: www.usadrug.com

USA Drug was a convenience store and pharmacy chain in the United States that operated more than 160 stores in Arkansas, Oklahoma, Mississippi, Missouri, and Tennessee. It was founded in Pine Bluff, Arkansas in 1986. Its headquarters are still located in Pine Bluff with additional offices in Little Rock, Arkansas, Tulsa, Oklahoma, and Memphis, Tennessee. Its parent company, Walgreens, operates Super D Drug Stores and Ikes Deep Discount Drug, both acquired in October 1997, and May's Drug, Med-X Drug, Drug Warehouse, and Drug Mart, all acquired in July 2004, as "Part of the USA Drug Family". Wal-Mart and CVS/Pharmacy are two of its primary competitors. The company's slogan is "America's Low Price Drug Store".

Steve LaFrance stepped down as CEO on October 20, 2006 and named Joe Courtright CEO of the company. Courtright was named president of the company in September and was vice president of pharmacy for Region 2 previous to that. LaFrance maintained a presence with the company as chairman.

On July 5, 2012, Walgreens announced the acquisition of USA Drug. In September 2012, Walgreens announced that they will be closing 76 USA Drug affiliated stores by November. Walgreens took ownership on September 15, 2012.

Steve Lee LaFrance SR. was born in 1941 in New Orleans and earned a bachelor of science in pharmacy degree at Northeast Louisiana State College of Monroe. After graduation, LaFrance took a pharmacist position at the Medic Pharmacy in Shreveport. Four years later, LaFrance worked 12 hours, six days a week, in Pine Bluff. He built Gibson’s pharmacy into a thriving business. Later he got the opportunity to buy another pharmacy just down the street but could not come up with the funds. After being turned down by several banks for loans, he finally secured the five thousand he needed to start the business. He expanded the stores to where by 2012 he had more than 150 stores.

LaFrance also started SAJ Distributors in the 1970s. SAJ allowed him to buy directly from vendors so he could sell at a better margin. SAJ grew to be the provider of more than 22,000 health, beauty and general merchandise products to over 1000 grocery, drug and discount stores.

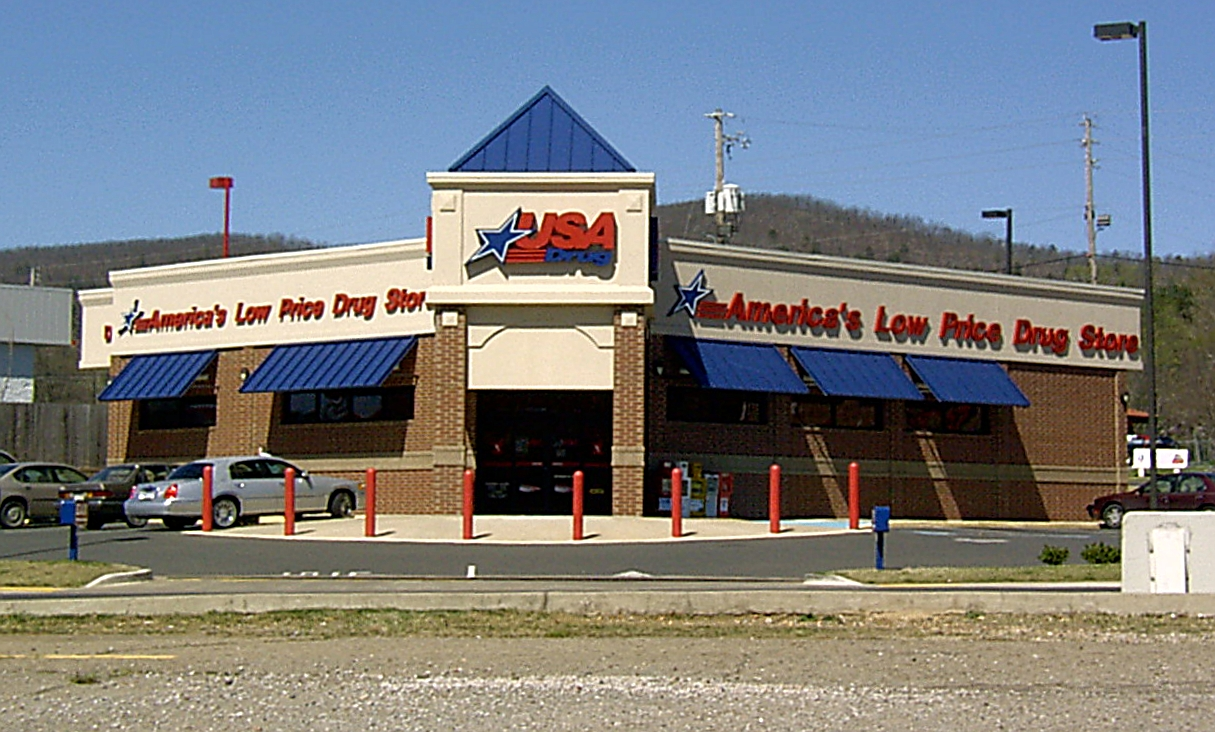
Exterior view of a typical USA Drug store located in Hot Springs, Arkansas

Upon making 26 dollars on opening day in 1968 at the first USA Drug in Pine Bluff, that profit went a lot further than LaFrance had ever dreamed possible. From the modest upbringing and start, LaFrance built the USA Drug chain into the largest privately owned pharmacy chain in the United States. USA Drug covered nine different states, with 150 different locations in 825 million dollars in annual sales, and supported more than 3500 employees and their families. In 2012, shortly before LaFrance passed, Walgreens acquired USA Drug for more than 550 million dollars, all from a 26 dollar opening day.
