= Old Market House (Galena, Illinois) =

- U.S. National Register of Historic Places
- Illinois State Historic Site
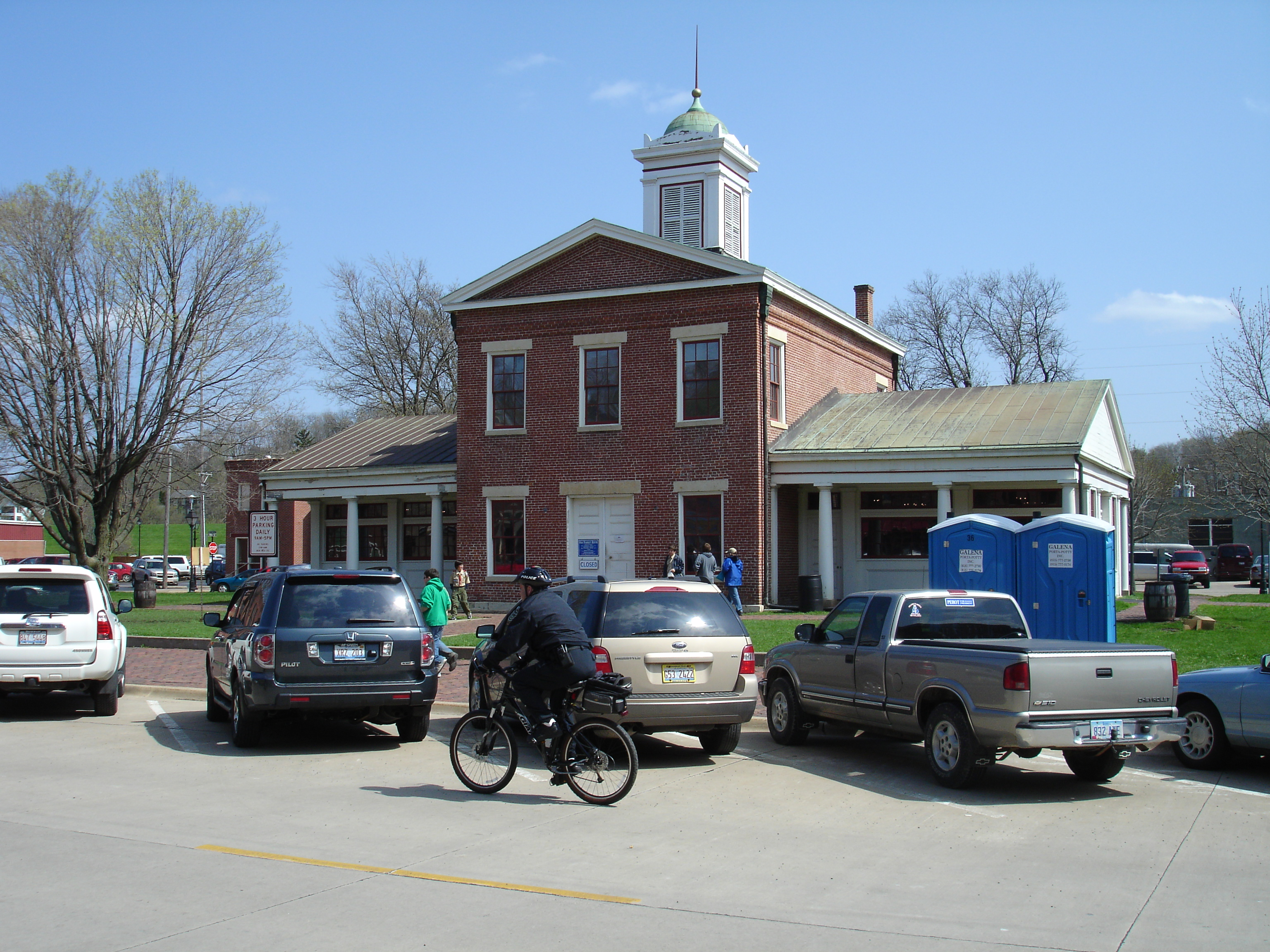

- Location within Illinois Location within the United States
- Location: 123 North Commerce Street, Galena, Jo Daviess County, Illinois
- Coordinates: 42°24′57″N 90°25′39″W
- Area: less than one acre
- Built: 1845
- Architectural style: Greek Revival
- NRHP reference No.: 73000707
- Added to NRHP: July 16, 1973

The Old Market House, currently being operated as the Galena Welcome Center, is a brick building built in the Greek Revival style in 1845 in Galena, Illinois. It is owned and operated by the Illinois Historic Preservation Agency as an Illinois State Historic Site.

== City hall and public market ==
The Old Market House was built by the city of Galena to serve as a city hall and enclosed public farmer's market. A rapid increase in population in the Galena area in the 1830s and 1840s, largely a result of the discovery of galena, a kind of lead ore found in the region, had led to a sharp increase in demand for local foodstuffs.

The Old Market House's business plan called for the US$50 per year rents from the twelve enclosed farmer's market stalls to help maintain the building. The $2,500 used for initial construction was obtained through the sale of $5 per share stocks, which was enabled by an 1845 act of the Galena City Council. Sellers who could not rent a stall were allocated space in the market square just outside the building.

== Cars and grocery stores ==
The Old Market House continued to serve the people of Galena until about 1910. As an increasing percentage of local citizens bought motor vehicles, households began to "shop around" for foodstuffs. Local grocery stores, which paid property taxes to the city of Galena, were not interested in helping to maintain their competitors. In about 1910 the stalls of the Old Market House went out of business.

The city of Galena moved its offices elsewhere in 1938, making the old building redundant. It was given to the state of Illinois in 1947.

== A frontier community ==
The Old Market House was extensively rebuilt and restored in 1954 to repair growing deterioration. It has been refitted by the Illinois Historic Preservation Agency to serve as a visitor services information desk and museum of local social history.
