= Market hall (disambiguation) =

A market hall is a covered space for selling different goods, mostly groceries.

Market Hall may also refer to:

- Market house, historically used as a marketplace to buy and/or sell provisions or livestock

== Bulgaria ==
- Central Sofia Market Hall, enclosed market in Sofia, Bulgaria

== Hungary ==
- Great Market Hall, Budapest, market hall in Budapest Hungary which opened in 1897

== Netherlands ==
- Market Hall (Rotterdam), residential and office building with a market hall underneath

== United Kingdom ==
- Amersham Market Hall, listed building in Amersham, Buckinghamshire, England
- Bolton Market Hall, listed building in Bolton, England converted into a modern shopping centre
- Carlisle Market Hall, covered Victorian market in Carlisle, Cumbria, England
- Leadenhall Market, covered market and tourist attraction in London city
- Market Hall, Monmouth, early Victorian building in Monmouth, Monmouthshire, Wales
- Market Hall Museum, Warwick, historic museum in Warwick, Warwickshire, England
- Old Market Hall, Shrewsbury, market house in Shrewsbury, England
- Smithfield Market Hall, derelict market in Manchester, England

== United States ==
- City Market (Charleston, South Carolina), historic market complex in Charleston, South Carolina, United States
- Dallas Market Center, building at the Dallas Market Center in Dallas, Texas, United States
