= International Women's Day =

Day to promote women's rights worldwide

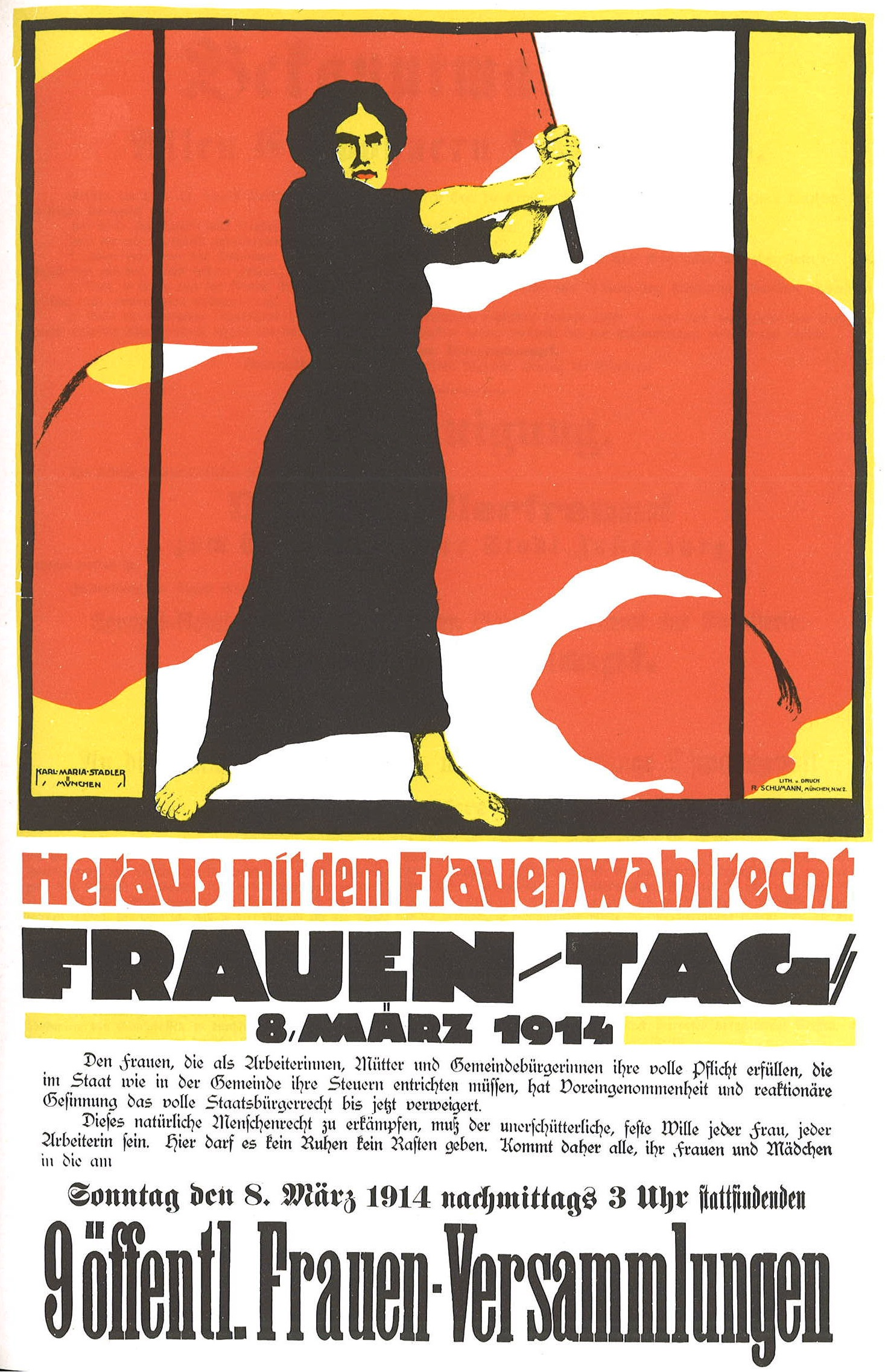
- German poster for International Women's Day, 8 March 1914. (Note: English: "Give Us Women's Suffrage. Women's Day, 8 March 1914. Until now, prejudice and reactionary attitudes have denied full civic rights to women, who as workers, mothers, and citizens wholly fulfill their duty, who must pay their taxes to the state as well as the municipality. Fighting for this natural human right must be the firm, unwavering intention of every woman, every female worker. In this, no pause for rest, no respite is allowed. Come all, you women and girls, to the ninth public women's assembly on Sunday, 8 March 1914, at 3 pm.") This poster was banned in the German Empire.
- Observed by: Worldwide
- Type: International
- Significance: Civil awareness day; Women and girls day; Anti-sexism day; Anti-discrimination day
- Date: 8 March
- Next time: 8 March 2027
- Frequency: Annual
- Related to: Mother's Day, Children's Day, International Men's Day, International Non-Binary People's Day

International Women's Day (IWD) is celebrated on 8 March, commemorating women's fight for equality and liberation along with the women's rights movement. International Women's Day gives focus to issues such as gender equality, reproductive rights, and violence and abuse against women. Spurred by the universal female suffrage movement, International Women's Day originated from labor movements in Europe and North America during the early 20th century.

The earliest version reported was a "Woman's Day" organized by the Socialist Party of America in New York City on 28 February 1909. In solidarity with them, communist activist and politician Clara Zetkin proposed the celebration of "Working Women's Day", approved at the 1910 International Socialist Women's Conference in Copenhagen, albeit with no set date; the following year saw the first demonstrations and commemorations of International Women's Day across Europe. Vladimir Lenin declared 8 March as International Women's Day in 1922 to honor the women's role in the 1917 Russian Revolution; it was subsequently celebrated on that date by the socialist movement and communist countries. The holiday was promoted by the United Nations in 1977.

International Women's Day is a public holiday in several countries. The UN observes the holiday in connection with a particular issue, campaign, or theme in women's rights.

== History ==
=== Origins ===
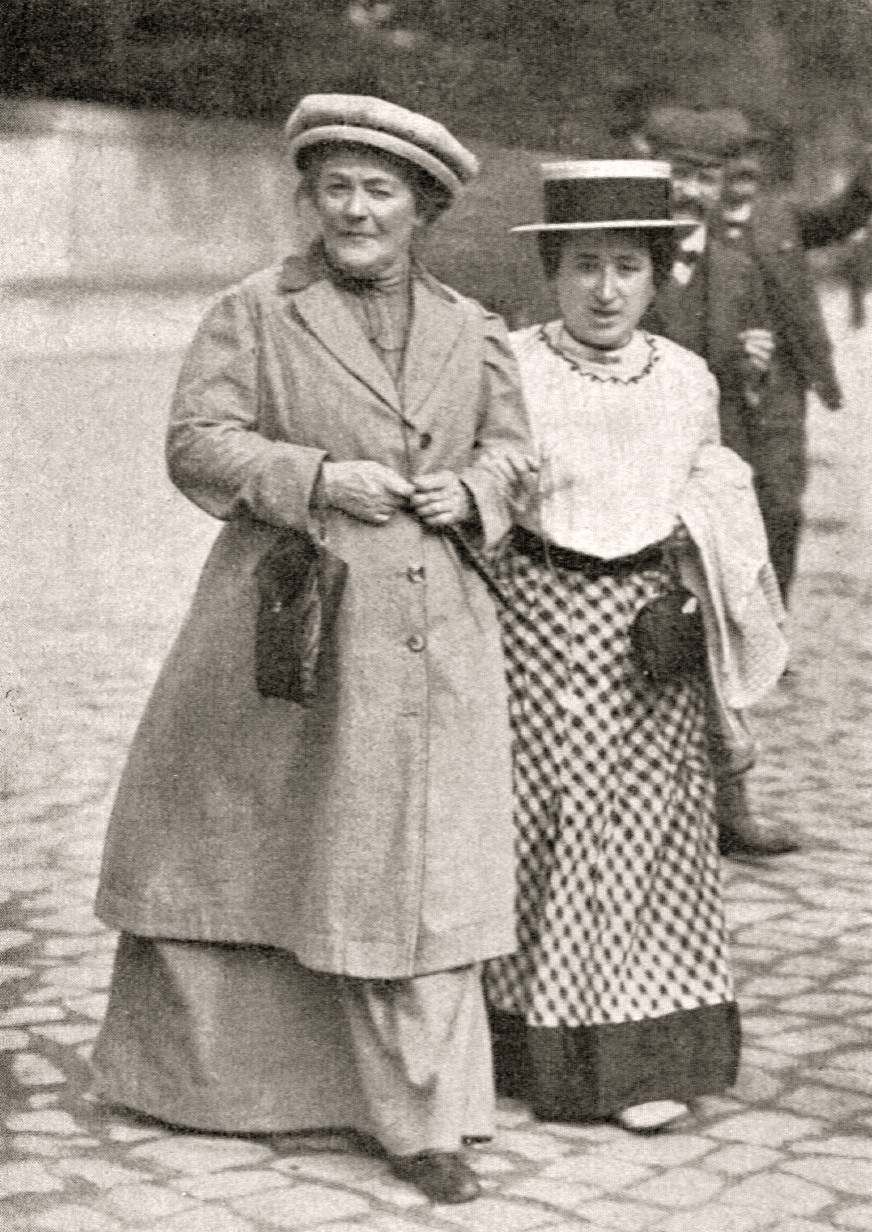
Clara Zetkin (left) and Rosa Luxemburg (right) in January 1910

The earliest reported Women's Day event, called "Woman's Day", was held on 28 February 1909, in New York City. It was organized by the Socialist Party of America at the suggestion of activist Theresa Malkiel. There have been claims that the day was commemorating a protest by women garment workers in New York on 8 March 1857, but researchers have described this as a myth.

In August 1910, an International Socialist Women's Conference was organized ahead of the general meeting of the Socialist Second International in Copenhagen, Denmark. Inspired in part by the American socialists, German delegates Clara Zetkin, Käte Duncker, Paula Thiede, and others proposed the establishment of an annual "Women's Day", although no date was specified. The 100 delegates, representing 17 countries, agreed with the idea as a strategy to promote equal rights, including women's suffrage.

The following year, on 19 March 1911, the first International Women's Day was marked by over a million people in Austria-Hungary, Denmark, Germany, and Switzerland. In Austria-Hungary alone, there were 300 demonstrations, with women parading on the Ringstrasse in Vienna, carrying banners honoring the martyrs of the Paris Commune. Across Europe, women demanded the right to vote and to hold public office, and protested against employment sex discrimination.

International Women's Day initially had no set date, though it was generally celebrated in late February or early March. Americans continued to observe "Woman's Day" on the last Sunday in February, while Russia observed International Women's Day for the first time in 1913, on the last Saturday in February (albeit based on the Julian calendar, as in the Gregorian calendar, the date was 8 March). In 1914, International Women's Day was held on 8 March for the first time in Germany, possibly because that date was a Sunday. As elsewhere, Germany's observance was dedicated to women's right to vote, which German women did not win until 1918. Concurrently, there was a march in London in support of women's suffrage, during which Sylvia Pankhurst was arrested in front of Charing Cross station on her way to speak in Trafalgar Square.

=== The Russian Revolution and Communist countries ===
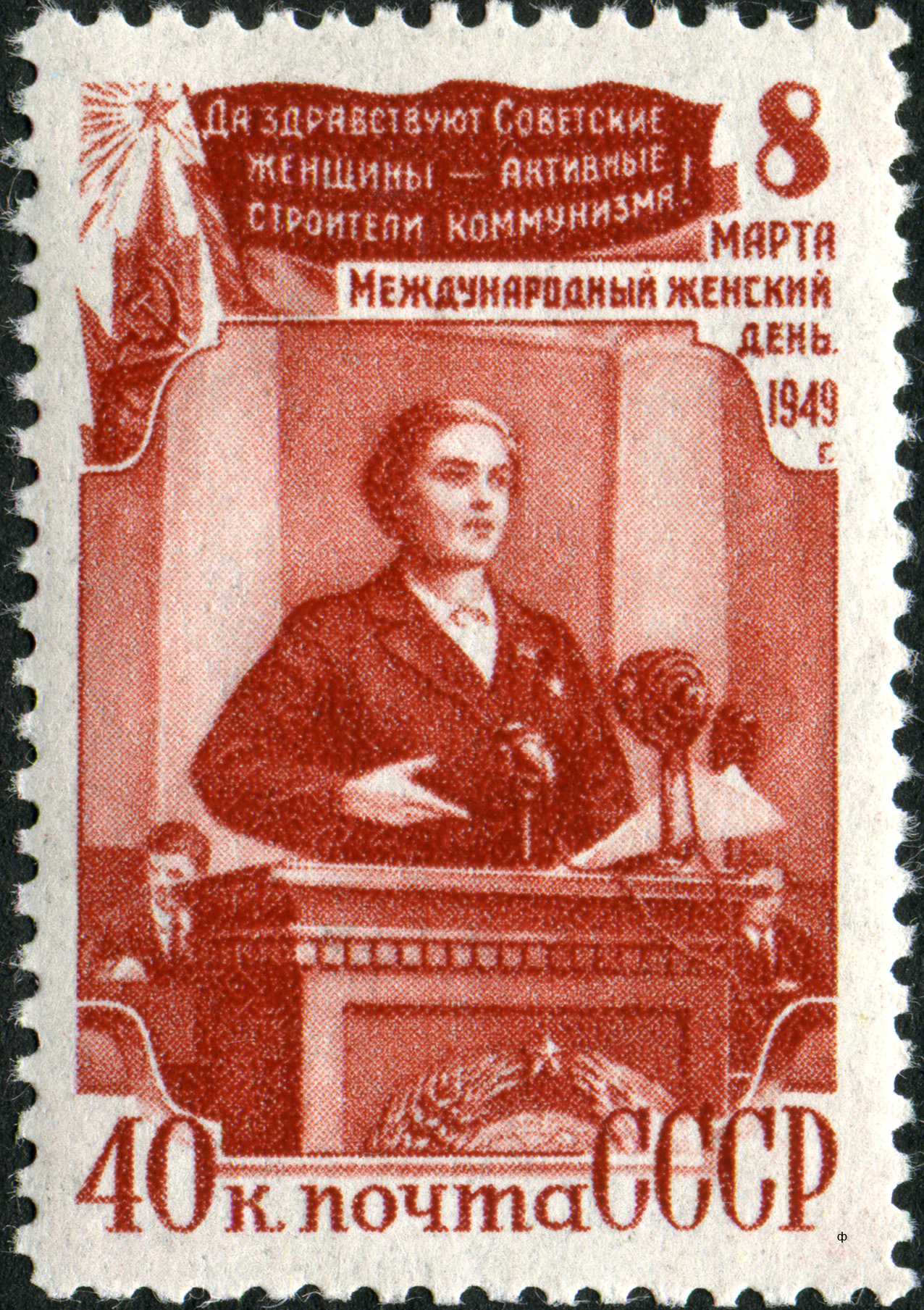
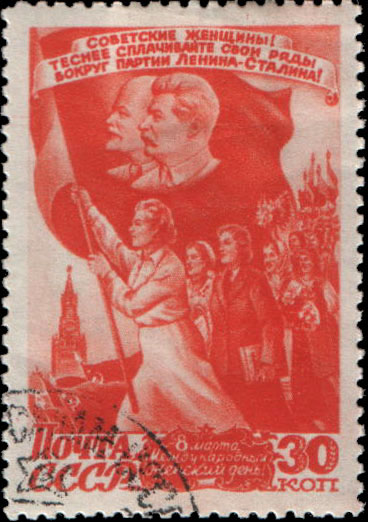
Soviet postage stamps

On 8 March 1917, in Petrograd (23 February in the Julian calendar), women textile workers began a demonstration that eventually engulfed the whole city, demanding "Bread and Peace"—an end to World War I, to food shortages, and to Tsarism. This marked the beginning of the February Revolution, which alongside the October Revolution, made up the Russian Revolution. Revolutionary leader Leon Trotsky wrote, "23 February (8 March) was International Woman's Day and meetings and actions were foreseen. But we did not imagine that this 'Women's Day' would inaugurate the revolution. Revolutionary actions were foreseen but without a date. But in the morning, despite the orders to the contrary, textile workers left their work in several factories and sent delegates to ask for the support of the strike... which led to mass strike... all went out into the streets." Seven days later, Tsar Nicholas II abdicated, and the provisional Government granted women the right to vote.

After the Russian Revolution, Bolsheviks began to celebrate the International Women's Day on 8 March as it marked the beginning of revolutionary changes in 1917 in Russia. However, it was not officially declared as such for some time. For example, the first congress of the newly founded Communist International could only adopt a very brief "Resolution on the Role of Working Women" submitted by Alexandra Kollontai on 6 March 1919, which made no mention of 8 March or International Women's Day. The second congress convened next year couldn't even find time for it, although it began holding an "International Conference of Communist Women" (organized by a newly created "International Secretariat on Work Amongst Women") under its auspices.

It was only during the third world congress of Communist International in 1921 that an important document titled "Methods and Forms of Work Among Communist Party Women: Theses" was adopted as a result of the work of the Second International Conference of Communist Women held in parallel to this congress. The theses mentioned "organizing an annual International Working Women's Day" among the tasks of central women's department of communist parties. The date of International Women's Day was also first fixed as March 8 at this Second International Conference of Communist Women. At the final evening session, the Bulgarian delegation presented a resolution on the need to celebrate International Women's Day on a single date throughout the world. Nikolaeva, a representative of the RSFSR, proposed to set the current date (March 8) in memory of the participation of Petrograd women in the demonstrations of March 8, 1917 that led to the overthrow of the monarchy, which was approved unanimously.

After its adoption in Soviet Russia, International Women's Day was predominantly celebrated in communist countries and by the communist movement worldwide. In the Czechoslovak Socialist Republic, huge Soviet-style celebrations were held annually. Chinese communists observed the holiday beginning in 1922, though it soon gained traction across the political spectrum. In 1927, Guangzhou saw a march of 25,000 women and male supporters, including representatives of the Kuomintang, the YWCA, and labor organizations. After the founding of the People's Republic of China on 1 October 1949, the State Council proclaimed on 23 December that 8 March would be made an official holiday, with women given a half-day off.

Hujum (Russian: Худжум, romanized: Khudzhum, IPA: [xʊd͡ʐʐʊm]; in Turkic languages, storming or assault, from Arabic: هجوم) was a series of policies and actions taken by the Communist Party of the Soviet Union, initiated by Joseph Stalin on International Women's Day in 1927, to remove all manifestations of gender inequality, especially the systems of female veiling and seclusion practiced in Central Asia. On 8 May 1965, the Presidium of the Supreme Soviet issued a decree to make 8 March, International Women's Day, a non-working public holiday 'in honor of the outstanding achievements of the Soviet women in building communism, defending the motherland during the Great Patriotic War, their heroism and selflessness both at the front and at home, and for their great contribution to the strengthening of friendship among peoples, and to the struggle for peace'.

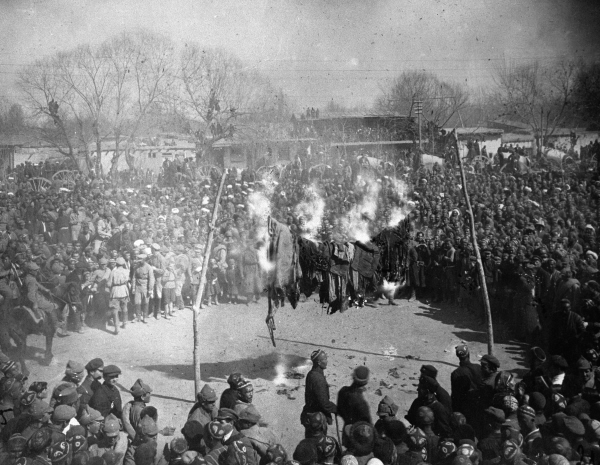
A veil-burning ceremony in Andijan on International Women's Day in 1927

=== Other countries, 1920s to 1960s ===
In 1928, Australia first observed International Women's Day, a rally in Sydney's Domain organized by the Militant Women's Group of the Communist Party. At that rally, held on 25 March, women rallied in support of fully paid annual holidays, equal pay for equal work, female store clerks having eight-hour days, an end to piece work, and a basic wage for those without employment. Later, the first International Women's Day marches happened in Sydney and Melbourne, in 1931. The Sydney march featured approximately sixty women leading three hundred to five hundred marchers. The Melbourne march consisted of fifty women leading one hundred and fifty marchers, with a banner in front stating, "Long Live International Women's Day". In 1938, the first major International Women's Day meeting in Perth was held; in attendance were women from the Association of University Women, Jewish Women, Mothers Union, Movement Against War and Fascism, National Council of Women, Spanish Relief Committee, Women's Christian Temperance Union, Women's International League for Peace and Freedom, Women's Section of Primary Producers, Women's Service Guilds, Young Labor League, and YWCA.

Communist leader Dolores Ibárruri led a women's march in Madrid in 1936 on the eve of the Spanish Civil War.

The Congress of American Women was an American women's rights organization founded in New York on International Women's Day in 1946, following the 1945 founding conference of the Women's International Democratic Federation in Paris, to which it affiliated. Its primary organizer was Elinor S. Gimbel (wife of Louis S. Gimbel, Jr., grandson of Adam Gimbel of Gimbels department store.) In 1948 the organization was attacked as a communist front organization by the House Un-American Activities Committee and was forced to register as a "subversive" organization. The organization was finally dissolved in 1950. The congress was an official US branch of the Women's International Democratic Federation, which though an antifascist organization was pro-Soviet. The organization supported progressive policies giving women full rights and equality both in the home and economically. They supported labor organizing and civil rights and were against anticommunist attacks on liberals. Though many members were communists or part of the popular front, membership in the organization included a broad mix of liberal, middle-class women.

In 1956 in Singapore, Chan Choy Siong, along with Ho Puay Choo and Oh Siew Chen, created the Women's League within the People's Action Party, and that year, to recognize International Women's Day, the League organized four rallies across Singapore, which attracted more than 2,000 people in total.

In 1958, Christina F. Lewis organized the first International Women's Day observance in Trinidad and Tobago.

In 1965, Anahita Ratebzad along with other members of the Democratic Organisation of Afghan Women (DOAW) organized a protest march on 8 March in Kabul, which was the first observance of International Women's Day in Afghanistan.

=== Second–wave feminism ===
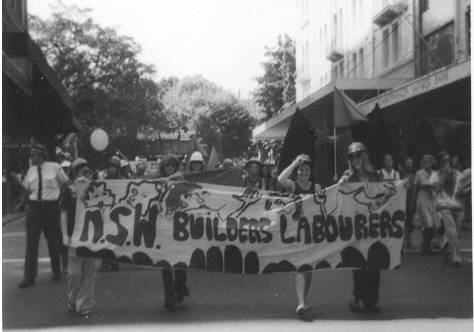
Female members of the Australian Builders Labourers Federation march on International Women's Day 1975 in Sydney

International Women's Day remained predominantly a communist holiday until circa 1967 when it was taken up by second-wave feminists. The day re-emerged as a day of activism, and is sometimes known in Europe as the "Women's International Day of Struggle". In the 1970s and 1980s, women's groups were joined by leftists and labor organizations in calling for equal pay, equal economic opportunity, equal legal rights, reproductive rights, subsidized child care, and the prevention of violence against women.

International Women's Day had been largely forgotten in the United States by the late 1960s, before an activist called Laura X organized a march in Berkeley, California, on International Women's Day in 1969. The march led to the creation of The Women's History Research Center, a central archive of the women's movement from 1968 to 1974. Laura X also thought it unfair for half the human race, meaning women, to have only one day a year and called for National Women's History Month to be built around International Women's Day. The Women's History Research Center collected nearly one million documents on microfilm, and provided resources and records of the women's liberation movement that are now available through the National Women's History Alliance, which carried on their ideas, including successfully petitioning Congress to declare March as Women's History Month.

In Australia, 1972 was when large International Women's Day marches began.

=== Adoption by United Nations ===
The United Nations began celebrating International Women's Day in 1975, which had been proclaimed the International Women's Year. In 1977, the United Nations General Assembly invited member states "to proclaim, in accordance with their historical and national traditions and customs, any day of the year as United Nations Day for Women's Rights and International Peace". In common with most countries, 8 March has been traditionally recognized as the day for International Women's Days by the UN for women's rights and world peace. It has since been commemorated annually by the UN and much of the world, with each year's observance centered on a particular theme or issue within women's rights.

Announced in 1978 on International Women's Day, the Women's Work Committee in Palestine came to represent an association willing to develop a strategy to combine national liberation and women's liberation. The founders of the committee were disappointed in the actions of previous charitable societies as they failed to educate the general population; to rectify this issue, they launched programs promoting literacy, health education, and classes teaching embroidery. Further aiding those of a working-class background, they started daycare centers to allow them to continue working as their children were being cared for.

On International Women's Day in 1979, a women's march took place in Tehran in Iran. The march was originally intended to celebrate International Women's Day, but transformed into massive protests against the changes taking place in women's rights during the Iranian revolution, specifically the introduction of mandatory hijab (veiling), which had been announced the day before. The protests lasted for six days, from 8 March to 14 March 1979, with thousands of women participating. The protests resulted in a temporary retraction of the decree of mandatory veiling. When the left and the liberals were eliminated, and the conservatives secured sole control, however, veiling was enforced on all women.

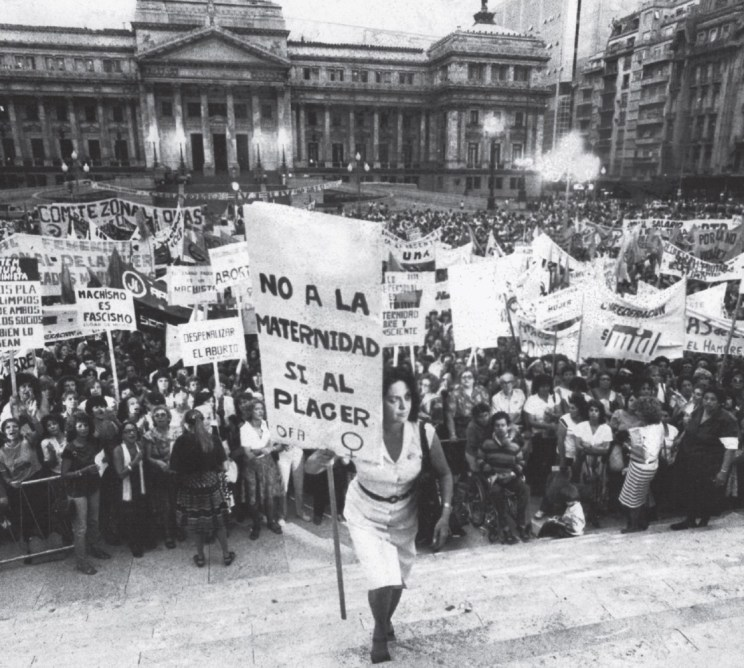
María Elena Oddone holding a banner, on International Women's Day in 1984 in Argentina. The banner says "No to motherhood, yes to pleasure"

On 8 March 1984 in Argentina, the first International Women's Day demonstrations since the end of the country's military regime took place in the Congressional Plaza, in what is now considered a landmark. The event was organized by the Multisectorial de la Mujer (English: Multisectorial of Women), an organization formed by members of women's groups, feminists, housewives and representatives of political parties and unions. An emblematic moment of the protests was when activist María Elena Oddone climbed up the stairs of the Monument of the Two Congresses and raised a banner that read "No to motherhood, yes to pleasure". Her banner, as well as those held by other radical feminists that day, was harshly criticized by the press for being too provocative. Oddone was also repudiated within the feminist movement. Elena Tchalidy, president of the Alicia Moreau de Justo Foundation, said: "8 March was the first public act and she walked with [that sign]. It came out in the magazine that today would be Caras or Gente. Then she said to me: 'Oh, three girls came to me.' 'Yes', I told her, 'and you distanced a few thousand.' Oddone recalled the meeting with the Multisectorial de la Mujer that took place two days after the event in her autobiography, claiming she replied to their "lapidary critics": "I am not a feminist to please anyone but to tell the truth about our condition. I did not write those banners to be liked. If they caused scandal, it is because the truth is always scandalous. We received Dr. Justo with admiration and affection. Eighty years ago, she and her companions who asked for the right to vote were called 'crazy'. I am willing to wait the same number of years for my banners to be understood."

=== Adoption by corporations ===
By the twenty-first century, International Women's Day had been criticized as heavily diluted and commercialized, particularly in the West, where it is sponsored by major corporations and used to promote general and vague notions of equality, rather than radical social reforms. The website internationalwomensday.com was established in 2001. The website was being managed by the British marketing firm Aurora Ventures with corporate sponsorship. The website began to promote hashtags as themes for the day, unconnected with the UN theme, which became used internationally. The day was commemorated by business breakfasts and social media communications that were deemed by some social critics as reminiscent of Mother's Day greetings.

== International Women's Day by year ==
=== 1995 ===
On International Women's Day in 1995, the Women's Committee of Glasgow City Council erected a plaque beside The Suffrage Oak which reads, 'This oak tree was planted by Women's Suffrage Organisations in Glasgow on 20 April 1918 to commemorate the granting of votes to women.'

=== 1996 ===
Gába is a bilingual Sámi magazine, published for the first time on International Women's Day in 1996, that is published by the Sámi women's forum Sami Nisson Forum. The articles mainly deal with the everyday life of the Sámi from a woman's perspective.

2000

Students from the Women's Group of Glasgow University Student Representative Council temporarily renamed a number of the university buildings to honor famous Glasgow women, so that the Adam Smith building was rechristened the Frances McPhun building, the building named after Sir William Pearce became the Marion Gilchrist building and the Boyd Orr building transformed into the Mary Hamilton building.

In addition, the Joseph Black building was rechristened the Mary Fairfax Sommerville building.

=== 2003 ===
On International Women's Day in 2003, Marcheline Bertrand and John Trudell produced a benefit concert for Afghan women refugees in conjunction with the United Nations High Commissioner for Refugees.

=== 2008 ===
Until June 2018, Saudi Arabia was the only country in the world in which women were forbidden from driving motor vehicles. A film of Saudi woman Wajeha al-Huwaider driving on International Women's Day 2008, which she did in honor of the day and in protest of the ban on women driving, attracted international media attention.

=== 2009 ===
Sara Azmeh Rasmussen became well known in Norway when she set fire to a veil on International Women's Day 2009. This gained international attention. During the symbolic action, Azmeh Rasmussen was bombarded with snowballs. She subsequently received death threats and hate emails.

=== 2010 ===
On the occasion of 2010 International Women's Day, the International Committee of the Red Cross (ICRC) drew attention to the hardships displaced women endure. The displacement of populations is one of the gravest consequences of today's armed conflicts. It affects women in a host of ways. It has been estimated that between 70 and 80% of all internally displaced persons are women and children.

Women's WorldWide Web (W4) is a European crowdfunding platform dedicated to women's empowerment. Lindsey Nefesh-Clarke officially launched W4 on International Women's Day 2010 with her ESCP-Europe colleagues and an international team of volunteers.

=== 2011 ===
Though the celebration in the West was low-key, events took place in more than 100 countries on March 8, 2011, to commemorate the 100th anniversary of International Women's Day. In the United States, President Barack Obama proclaimed March 2011 to be "Women's History Month", calling Americans to mark International Women's Day by reflecting on "the extraordinary accomplishments of women" in shaping the country's history. Secretary of State Hillary Clinton launched the "100 Women Initiative: Empowering Women and Girls through International Exchanges", on the eve of International Women's Day. In the run-up to 2011 International Women's Day, the Red Cross called on States and other entities not to relent in their efforts to prevent rape and other forms of sexual violence that harm the lives and dignity of countless women in conflict zones around the world every year.

Australia issued an International Women's Day 100th anniversary commemorative 20-cent coin, on which can be seen "INTERNATIONAL WOMEN'S DAY" and "1911 2011", and three figures superimposed on top of the words "CELEBRATING 100 YEARS", with those words repeated twelve times. Also, the Australian Women Chamber of Commerce & Industry was launched on 2011's International Women's Day.

During the Egyptian revolution, in Tahrir Square, Cairo, hundreds of men harassed the women who came out to stand up for their rights as the police and military stood by watching, doing nothing to stop the men.

A coalition of 17 Iraqi women's rights groups formed the National Network to Combat Violence Against Women in Iraq on International Women's Day 2011.

The Suffrage Science award is a prize for women in science, engineering, and computing founded in 2011, on the 100th anniversary of International Women's Day, by the MRC London Institute of Medical Sciences (LMS).

=== 2012 ===
Oxfam America invited people to celebrate inspiring women in their lives by sending a free International Women's Day e-Card or honoring a woman whose efforts had made a difference in the fight against hunger and poverty with Oxfam's International Women's Day award.

On the occasion of International Women's Day 2012, the ICRC called for more action to help the mothers and wives of people who have gone missing during armed conflict. The vast majority of people who go missing in connection with conflict are men. As well as the anguish of not knowing what has happened to the missing husband or son, many of these women face economic and practical difficulties. The ICRC underlined the duty of parties to this conflict to search for the missing and provide information to the families.

Kabul's first internet cafe for women, named the Sahar Gul internet cafe, was opened on International Women's Day in 2012.

On International Women's Day 2012 Alesha Dixon launched Avon's Pass It On campaign to highlight domestic abuse issues in the United Kingdom by encouraging the purchase of a necklace, described by her as "a symbol of women's empowerment, and infinite possibilities for women"; the proceeds from those purchases were donated to Refuge and Women's Aid.

=== 2013 ===
The International Committee of the Red Cross (ICRC) drew attention to the plight of women in prison.

It was reported the 70% of women worldwide experience some sort of physical or sexual violence in their life. Irina Bovoka, UNESCO Director General as of International Women's Day 2013, stated that in order "to empower women and ensure equality, we must challenge every form of violence every time it occurs." In view of the increase in violence against women and following the brutal attack on Malala Yousafzai in October 2012, the UN focused their attention on ending violence against women and made this the central theme for International Women's Day 2013. UNESCO acknowledged that violence against young girls was one of the major reasons for girls not attending school and subsequently collaborated with governments around the globe to support women's rights in providing a quality education in a safe environment.

For a more cultural and artistic celebration, UNESCO also held a concert in Paris as a "Tribute to Women in Music: from the romantic to the electronics".

Bhagat Phool Singh Government Medical College for Women was inaugurated on International Women's Day 2013; it is the first women's Government Medical College of independent India and the first such institution in North India since Delhi's Lady Hardinge Medical College that was established in 1914.

Bobbi Brown Cosmetics launched the Pretty Powerful Campaign for Women & Girls on International Women's Day in 2013. Pretty Powerful supports organizations that seek to empower women through job skills training programs and girls through education.

=== 2014 ===
International Women's Collaboration Brew Day is an annual event that takes place each year on International Women's Day since 2014, which gathers women brewers around the world who brew the same beer, with all proceeds donated to charity. It was established to raise awareness of women in the brewing industry, especially as beer brewmasters. It also networks women interested in brewing.

=== 2015 ===
Governments and activists around the world commemorated the 20th anniversary year of the Beijing Declaration and Platform for Action, an historic roadmap that set the agenda for realizing women's rights.

For International Women's Day in 2015, Amnesty International Australia collaborated with youth dating app Tinder to raise awareness of women's rights. Slogans included "Not all women have the power to choose like you do" and "You pick your partner. Many women aren't given the choice."

The Feminist Five were five Chinese women – Li Maizi (birth name Li Tingting), Wu Rongrong, Zheng Churan, Wei Tingting and Wang Man – who were detained for 37 days after planning to hand out anti-sexual harassment stickers on the subway ahead of International Women's Day 2015 and became known following their arrest. Their arrest sparked outrage both internationally and domestically, leading to protests in support of the five women in the United States, the United Kingdom, South Korea, Hong Kong, India, Poland and Australia, although protests within China were subject to censorship and crackdowns. They were released on bail on 13 April 2015 due to the backlash following their detention.

The Nari Shakti Puraskar, the highest civilian honor for women in India, is presented by the president of India on International Women's Day; the award was instituted in 1999 under the title of Stree Shakti Puraskar, but was renamed and reorganized in 2015.

The British Ambassador's residence in Belgrade, "Elsie Inglis House", is named after Elsie Inglis, a doctor and campaigner for women's suffrage and founder of the Scottish Women's Hospitals in Serbia. The renaming ceremony took place on International Women's Day in 2015 and was conducted by the President of Serbia Tomislav Nikolic and then UK Ambassador Denis Keefe.

The Female Lead is an educational charity launched on International Women's Day 2015 in the United Kingdom, dedicated to increasing the visibility of women's success stories in all walks of life and offering girls a wider selection of role models than those represented in popular culture. It was founded by data science entrepreneur Edwina Dunn.

The Women's Classical Committee was formed on International Women's Day 2015, at the Institute of Classical Studies, London. It is a group of academics, students, and teachers who aim to support women in Classics, promote feminist and gender-informed perspectives in Classics, raise the profile of the study of women in antiquity and Classical reception, and advance equality and diversity in Classics.

=== 2016 ===
On International Women's Day 2016, One Campaign relaunched their Poverty is Sexist campaign, featuring an updated report including new figures, such as the fact that as of 2016 half a billion women still cannot read and that girls account for 74% of all new HIV infections among adolescents across Africa.

The President of India, Shri Pranab Mukherjee, said: "On the occasion of International Women's Day, I extend warm greetings and good wishes to the women of India and thank them for their contributions over the years in the building of our nation." The ministry of women and child development announced the setting up of four more one-stop crisis centers on March 8, in addition to the eight already functioning across the country. Ahead of Women's Day, the national carrier Air India operated what it claimed to be the world's longest non-stop flight where the entire flight operations were handled by women, as part of International Women's Day celebrations. The flight, from Delhi to San Francisco, covered a distance of around 14,500 kilometers in around 17 hours.

While speaking at an International Women's Day 2016 event in India, Kanhaiya Kumar referred to the rape of Kashmiri women committed by personnel of the Indian Army. This was criticized as being "anti-national" by the Bharatiya Janata Yuva Morcha (BJYM). The BJYM filed a complaint against Kumar and JNU professor Nivedita Menon, alleging them of making "anti-national" statements. A sedition and defamation case was filed against Kumar in a civil court in Patna. Also, on 10 March 2016, Kumar was manhandled and abused on the JNU campus by a man who accused him of being a deshdrohi (transl. traitor to the nation). However, while addressing students later in the day, Kumar said such incidents could not scare him.

=== 2017 ===
In a message in support of International Women's Day, the UN Secretary-General António Guterres commented on how women's rights were being "reduced, restricted and reversed". With men still in leadership positions and a widening economic gender gap, he called for change "by empowering women at all levels, enabling their voices to be heard and giving them control over their own lives and over the future of our world".

The first Jakarta Women's March was held on 4 March 2017 in commemoration of International Women's Day on March 8 and the 2017 Women's March movement in the United States. The march was held in front of the State Palace in which organizers of the event delivered eight demands to the government which included: tolerance, diversity and health rights for women, elimination of violence against women, protecting the living environment and female workers, improving representation of women in the political scene, and eliminating discrimination and violence against the LGBT community. The 2017 Women's March was sponsored by 33 different organizations.

The SahibaSisters Foundation, Tanzania's first feminist activist institute, was founded on International Women's Day 2017.

In Turkey, a mob illegally entered the Istanbul Bilgi University campus on International Women's Day and attacked students celebrating the day.

On International Women's Day 2017, the Venezuelan national government transferred the symbolic remains of Apacuana, along with those of the African slaves Hipólita and Matea, to the National Pantheon of Venezuela, where the main figures of the country's history rest.

=== 2018 ===
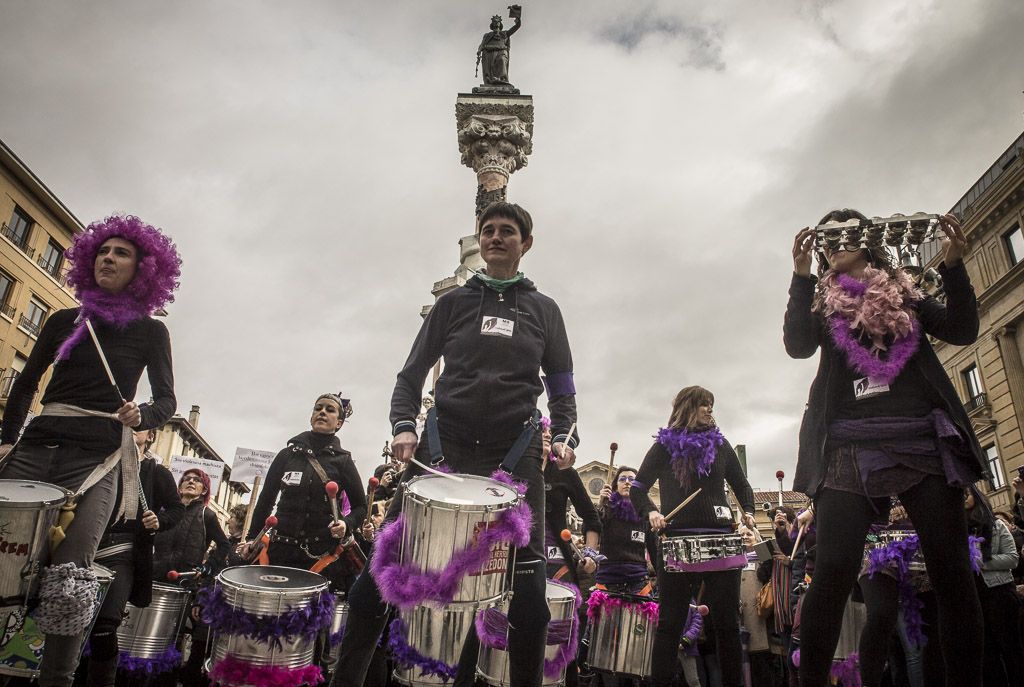
8M 2018 in Pamplona

Global marches and online campaigns such as #MeToo and #TimesUp, which originated in the United States but became popular globally, allowed many women from different parts of the world to confront injustice and speak out on issues such as sexual harassment and assault and the gender pay gap.

International Women's Strike, also known as Paro Internacional de Mujeres, was a global movement coordinated across over 50 countries on International Women's Day, in 2017 and 2018. The Sex/Work Strike began in 2018 as part of the International Women's Strike on International Women's Day with the aim of decriminalization of sex work. Participants that year included the writer Molly Smith, an author of Revolting Prostitutes.

In downtown Pristina, Kosovo, on International Women's Day 2018, three billboards were put up to protest the death of two women as a result of domestic violence.

Women Democratic Front (WDF), an independent socialist-feminist organization based and founded in Pakistan, was founded on International Women's Day 2018, by hundreds of delegates from Balochistan, Khyber-Pakhtunkhwa, Punjab, and Sindh. WDF aims to unite women across the country to build a socialist feminist movement to transform the International Women's Day celebration in Pakistan into real means of action. The manifesto and constitution of WDF opposes capitalism, patriarchy, religious fascism, national oppression and Pakistan's political system.

In 2018 and again in 2019, McDonald's turned its arches upside down on its social media accounts in celebration of International Women's Day, changing the "M" to a "W". A McDonald's franchise operated by Patricial Williams in Lynwood, California, also flipped the arches on its sign. This prompted a mild backlash, with some arguing that the move was hypocritical due to the chain's underpaying of employees, and others observing that the "M" in the logo could just as easily stand for "men" as it could for "McDonald's".

Overlooked No More is a recurring feature in the obituary section of The New York Times, which honors "remarkable people" whose deaths had been overlooked by editors of that section since its creation in 1851. The feature was introduced on March 8, 2018 for International Women's Day, where the Times published fifteen obituaries of such "overlooked" women, and has since become a weekly feature in the paper. The project was created by Amisha Padnani, the digital editor of the obituaries desk, and Jessica Bennett, the paper's gender editor. In its introduction, it was admitted that the paper's obituaries had been "dominated by white men", and that the project was intended to help "address these inequities of our time".

=== 2019 ===
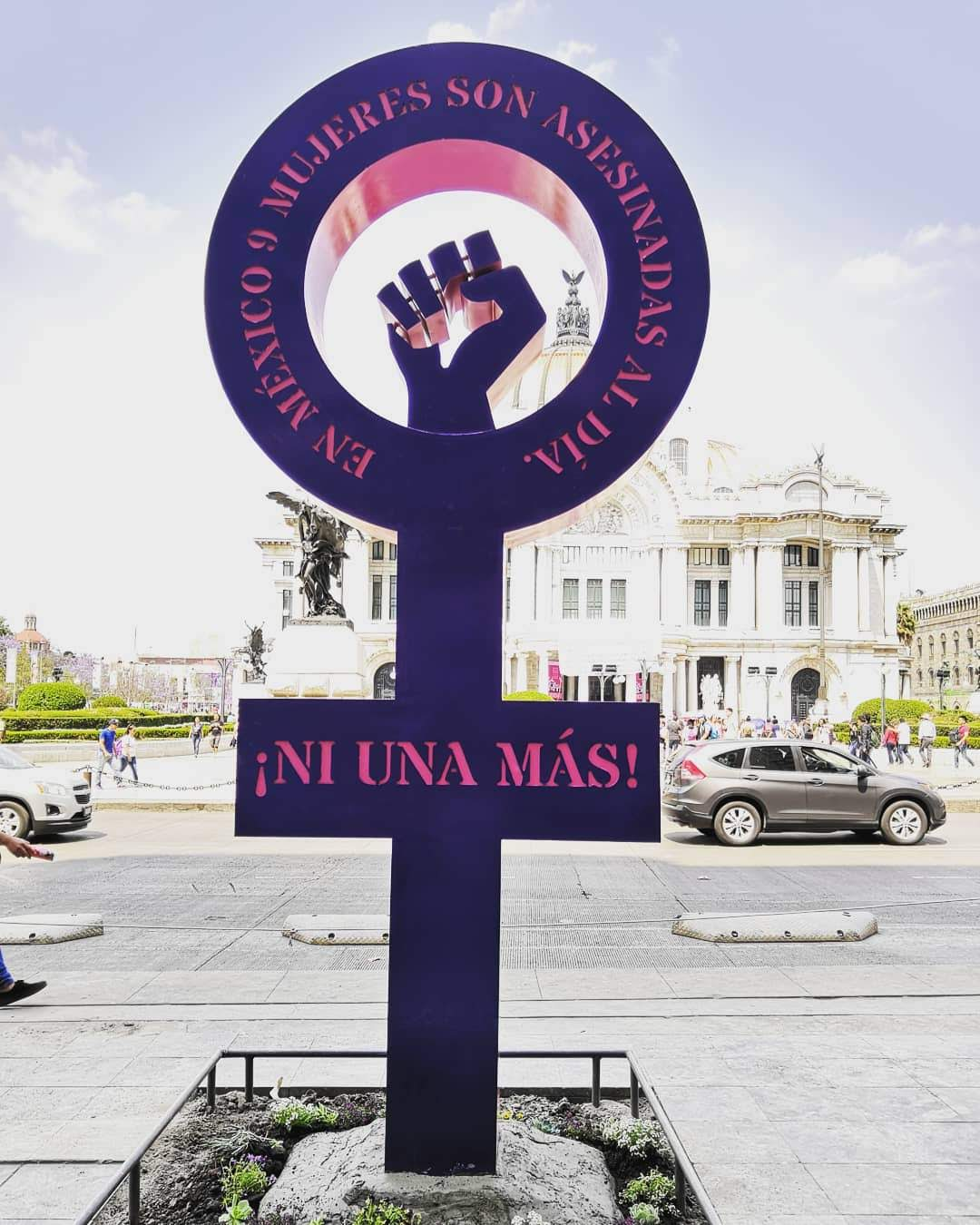
An Antimonumenta, installed in Mexico City on International Women's Day 2019, as photographed the day after. The circle part says "In Mexico 9 women are murdered daily" and the cross part says "Not one more!" On the opposite side, the Antimonumenta reads "We demand a national gender alert", and in the central part "No + Femicides"

The federal state of Berlin marked International Women's Day as a public holiday for the first time in 2019, with parliament having approved that in January of that year. Berlin was the first German state to make International Women's Day a public holiday.

In Tehran, Iran on International Women's Day 2019, groups of women appeared unveiled and protested the oppression of women. A video showed two unveiled women holding a red sign, which read "International Women's Day is a promise of a just world for all of humanity", on Valiasr Street. Another video showed a group of unveiled women on a Tehran Metro car handing out flowers to passengers.

An Antimonumenta was erected on 8 March 2019 on Juárez Avenue, in front of the Palace of Fine Arts in Mexico City, during the annual Mexican International Women's Day march of women protesting against gender violence. The installation of the structure lasted more than two hours, and it was paid for by relatives of victims of femicide, feminist collectives and civil society organizations. According to activists: "This anti-monument is to remind us that there is still no justice for women in Mexico, that we continue disappearing and that we continue being killed. We will not remain silent". Original text in Spanish: "Este antimonumento es para recordar que sigue sin haber justicia para las mujeres en México, que seguimos desapareciendo y que nos siguen matando. No nos vamos a callar".

On International Women's Day 2019, the Burning Sun scandal led to a street protest in Gangnam, South Korea against the Burning Sun and other nightclubs, calling for an end to what the protesters called a culture that treats women as sexual objects.

=== 2020 ===
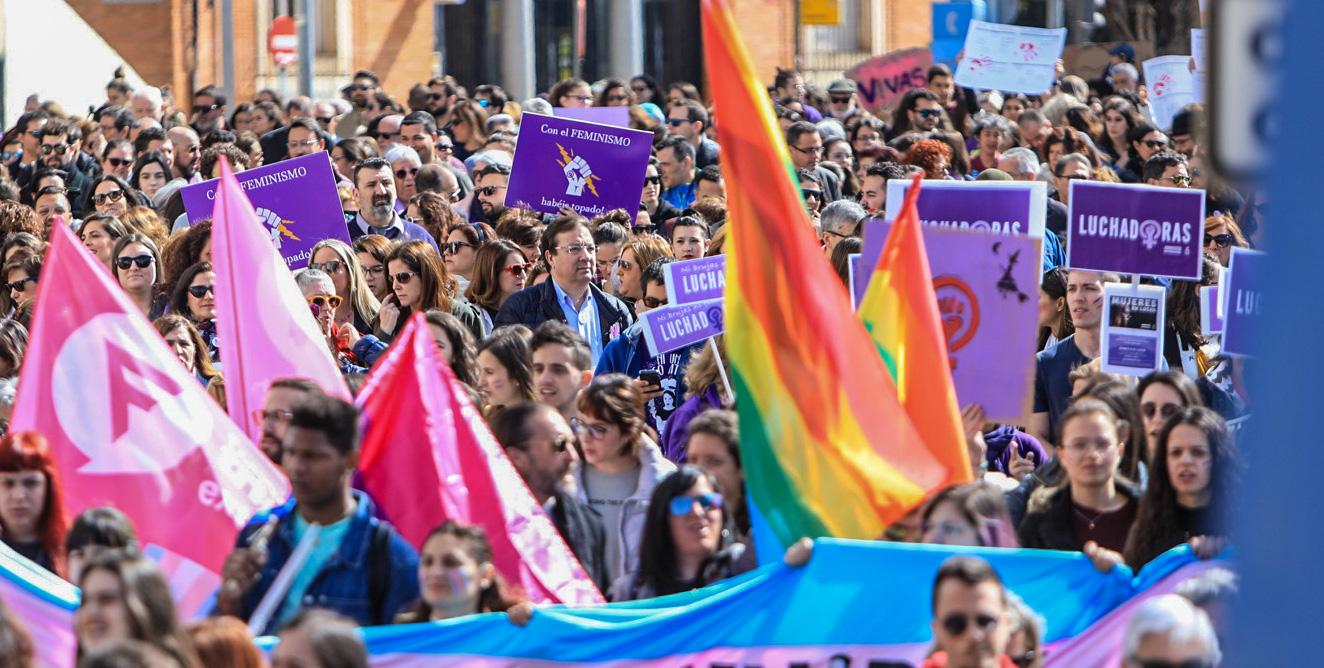
8M 2020 in Spain

Despite the COVID-19 pandemic, street marches occurred in London, Paris, Madrid, Brussels, Moscow and other European cities.

The Aurat March in Islamabad was marred by attacks from stone throwers, after a failed attempt to have it banned as un-Islamic.

In Bishkek, the capital of Kyrgyzstan, police detained dozens of marchers shortly after masked men reportedly attacked the march.

In 2020, the coalition sponsoring the Jakarta Women's March expanded to over 60 civil rights organizations under Gerak Perempuan (the Women's Movement against Violence alliance). The march was held at the same time of year as the first event in 2017 and held in conjunction with International Women's Day. Protestors took to the streets to demand that the government put a stop to systematic violence against women and pass the sexual assault eradication bill. The demands of the coalition included the establishment of a system of laws that protect women and the abolishment of discriminatory regulations.

Mexico saw women take to the streets on International Women's Day 2020 to demand that the government be held accountable for their inability to acknowledge gender violence as an issue. They demanded that murderers be held accountable for their crimes, and that awareness be brought to the sexual and physical harassment experienced by women daily. On the day of the protest, an estimated 80,000 people took part in Mexico City. The following day, Brujas del Mar, a group of women from Veracruz led the charge of another protest. On March 9, the protest was dubbed "Un Día Sin Mujeres" (A Day Without Women). The aim of this subsequent protest was to simulate a world in which women did not exist. The protest encouraged women to stay home and withdraw from activities that they would normally be involved in. Women stayed home from work, school, social media and refrained from making online purchases.

Witches of Scotland was a campaign launched on International Women's Day in 2020, led by Claire Mitchell QC and writer Zoe Venditozzi, seeking legal pardons and justice for the people, primarily women, convicted of witchcraft and executed in Scotland between 1563 and 1736. A pardon and an apology was made on International Women's Day 2022.

The Women's Party (Korean: 여성의당), a South Korean single-issue political party, was founded on International Women's Day 2020 and advocates for feminism. The party calls for greater representation of women and equality in politics and an end to all forms of violence, discrimination and inequality against women in the workplace.

=== 2021 ===
On International Women's Day 2021, politician Dave Sharma of Australia was criticized for handing out flowers to women while the Morrison Government faced ongoing scrutiny over how it had handled allegations of rape and sexual misconduct by government ministers and staffers. The gesture was seen by some as "failing to read the room", and was held up as evidence of the government being out of touch on women's rights issues.

In Guatemala City a thousand women and men marched demanding an end to violence against women on International Women's Day 2021.

An Antimonumenta was installed next to the Fuente de las Tarascas, along Francisco I. Madero Avenue in Morelia, Michoacán, Mexico, on International Women's Day 2021, during the annual Mexican march of women protesting against gender violence. The sculpture, symbolically named Antimonumenta, was inspired by other similar anti-monuments like the one in Mexico City. The erection of an antimonumenta symbolizes the demand for justice for women who suffer from violence in the country. The original work was destroyed a few hours after its installation, but a replica was installed the following month. The original Antimonumenta was painted completely in purple and it was represented with a symbol of the feminist struggle, which is based on the symbol of Venus with a raised fist in the center. In feminism, the color purple often represents "loyalty, constancy towards a purpose [and] unwavering firmness towards a cause". The Antimonumenta was a metal sculpture whose upper part had, written in Spanish, in violet capital letters: "Alive, free and happy", while on the arm of the cross it was written, "Not one more!". On the opposite side, the Antimonumenta had written the same phrases. The replica is painted in purple and pink, and has written on it the same slogans but now written in white. According to the installers, the Antimonumenta represents the victims of femicide, as well as a method to invoke compassion, empathy and solidarity towards their cause. Another anti-monument in Mexico was installed in Orizaba the same year the day before International Women's Day, during International Women's Day protests, and another was installed in Veracruz City the same year on International Women's Day, also during International Women's Day protests.

On International Women's Day 2021, 5,000 women marched in San Salvador demanding decriminalization of abortion and an end to violence against women.

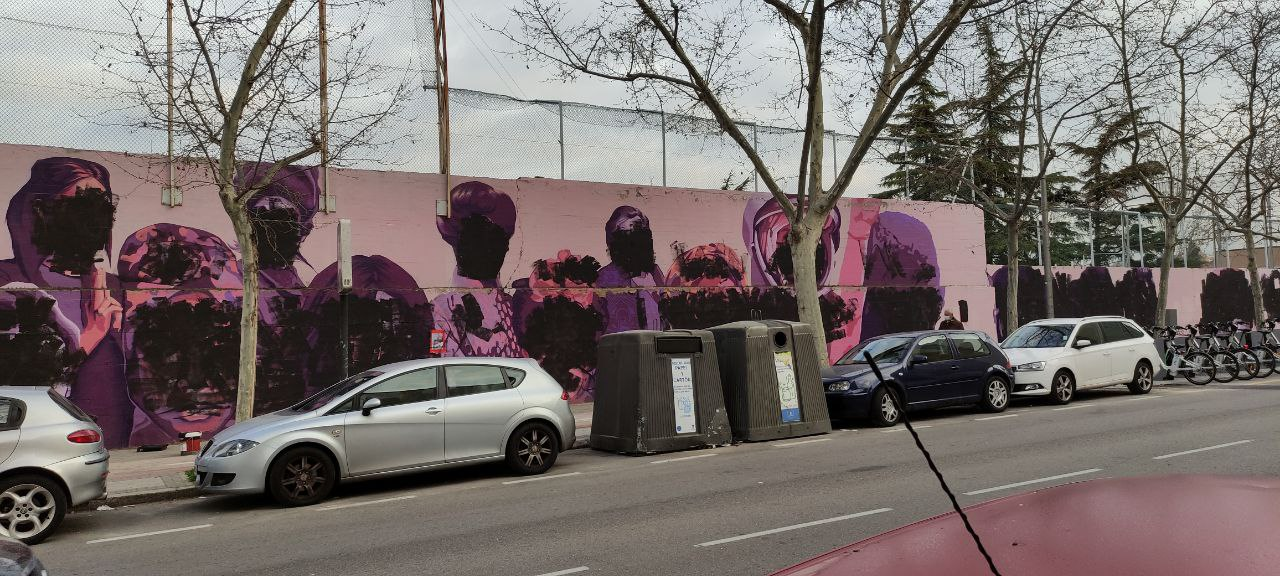
The vandalized Concepción Feminist Mural in Spain, which was vandalized on International Women's Day 2021.

In the early hours of International Women's Day 2021, the Concepción Feminist Mural in Spain was vandalized by extreme right-wing groups who erased its message and covered the faces of the 15 women in the mural with black paint, and also used banners that read 'Terrorist', 'Abortionist' and 'Communist'. Madrid City Council condemned the attack on the work and pledged to restore the mural.

Burger King was criticized after a tweet from Burger King UK on International Women's Day 2021 stated, "Women belong in the kitchen." The tweet was labeled as sexist by thousands of Twitter users and dozens of news publications. Burger King UK followed up, stating "We're on a mission to change the gender ratio in the restaurant industry." Eventually, after severe backlash, Burger King deleted the original tweet 12 hours later and posted an apology stating, "We got our initial tweet wrong and we're sorry."

On International Women's Day 2021, it was announced that India and England would play a one-off women's cricket Test later in the year. The Test was played at Bristol County Ground, between 16 and 19 June 2021.

Several hundred Uyghur women protested the abuse of Uyghurs by the Chinese government on International Women's Day in 2021.

The Women Divers Hall of Fame announced on International Women's Day 2021 that a new research grant in the name of Simone Melchior-Cousteau was being launched.

=== 2022 ===
In 2022 on International Women's Day, Feminist Anti-War Resistance organized the laying of flowers – chrysanthemums and tulips bound with blue and yellow ribbons – by women at war monuments:

We, the women of Russia, refuse to celebrate 8 March this year: don't give us flowers, it's better to take to the streets and lay them in memory of the dead civilians of Ukraine.

These protests extended to embassies as well as monuments, and took place across 94 Russian and international cities, including Saint Petersburg, Moscow, Vladivostok, Yekaterinburg, Novosibirsk, Krasnoyarsk, Kanash, Yaroslavl, Syktyvkar, Smolensk, Luga, Lytkarino, Izhevsk, Volgograd, Irkutsk, Nizhny Novgorod, Ufa, Omsk, Mytishchi, Gelendzhik, Perm, Kazan, Zelenograd, Balashov, Saratov, Biysk, Khimki, Chelyabinsk, Krasnodar, Novovoronezh, Vologda, Korolev, Troitsk, Serpukhov, Vladimir, Revda, Tolyatti, Kaliningrad, Naberezhnye Chelny, Volgodonsk, Ramenskoye, Samara, Leninavan farm, Stavropol, Arkhangelsk, Yoshkar-Ola, Krasnogorsk, Novokuibyshevsk, Zheleznovodsk, Murom, Snegiri, Nakhabino, Rostov-on-Don, Cheboksary, Saransk, Dzerzhinsky, Veliky Novgorod, Tyumen, Tobolsk, Podolsk, Tula, Grebnevo village, Dolgoprudny, Murino, Vladikavkaz and Alagir.

On 9 March 2022 the CEO of Fairmont Hot Springs resort, Vivek Sharma, asked women attending the BC Tourism and Hospitality Conference to stand in honor of International Women's Day, then after a round of applause told them to "go clean some rooms and do some dishes." It was a week before he issued an unapologetic "apology" offering to learn how to make the industry a "safer place" for women.

Also in 2022, in Germany, Mecklenburg-Western Pomerania's state parliament voted to make International Women's Day a public holiday.

In March 2022, Tanzania prosecutors dropped the terrorism case against Freeman Mbowe. Following the release of Freeman Mbowe and his immediate conversation with President Samia Suluhu, his first appearance days later was at the International Women's Day event in Iringa in 2022. This caused critics to accuse Suluhu of releasing Mbowe on condition of support for Western feminist policies.

=== 2023 ===
In Japan in 2023 there was a rally recognizing International Women's Day at which a statement was delivered to lawmakers by representatives from many women's rights groups; the statement was in favor of changing the Japanese civil code, which requires married couples to choose one last name, "the surname of the husband or wife". As of 2023, 95% of Japanese women take their husbands' last name, due to sexist family values and women being considered to be marrying into their husband's household.

In the capital of Kosovo, hundreds of ethnically Albanian women threw smoke bombs at the headquarters of the police while protesting domestic violence.

In the Philippines, there was a rally in Manila at which protestors from different women's groups gathered in Manila to protest for good jobs and better wages.

In Tanzania, there was an International Women's Day rally arranged by an opposition party opposed to Samia Suluhu Hassan, the first female President of Tanzania; she stated, "The opposition is lucky that it is a woman president in charge because if a misunderstanding occurs, I will stand for peace and make the men settle their egos".

In Turkey, a march was officially banned, but women still tried to protest in favor of women's rights and against the suffering of many people due to an earthquake in Turkey that year, made worse by unsafe buildings. Police detained some people and used tear gas.

=== 2024 ===
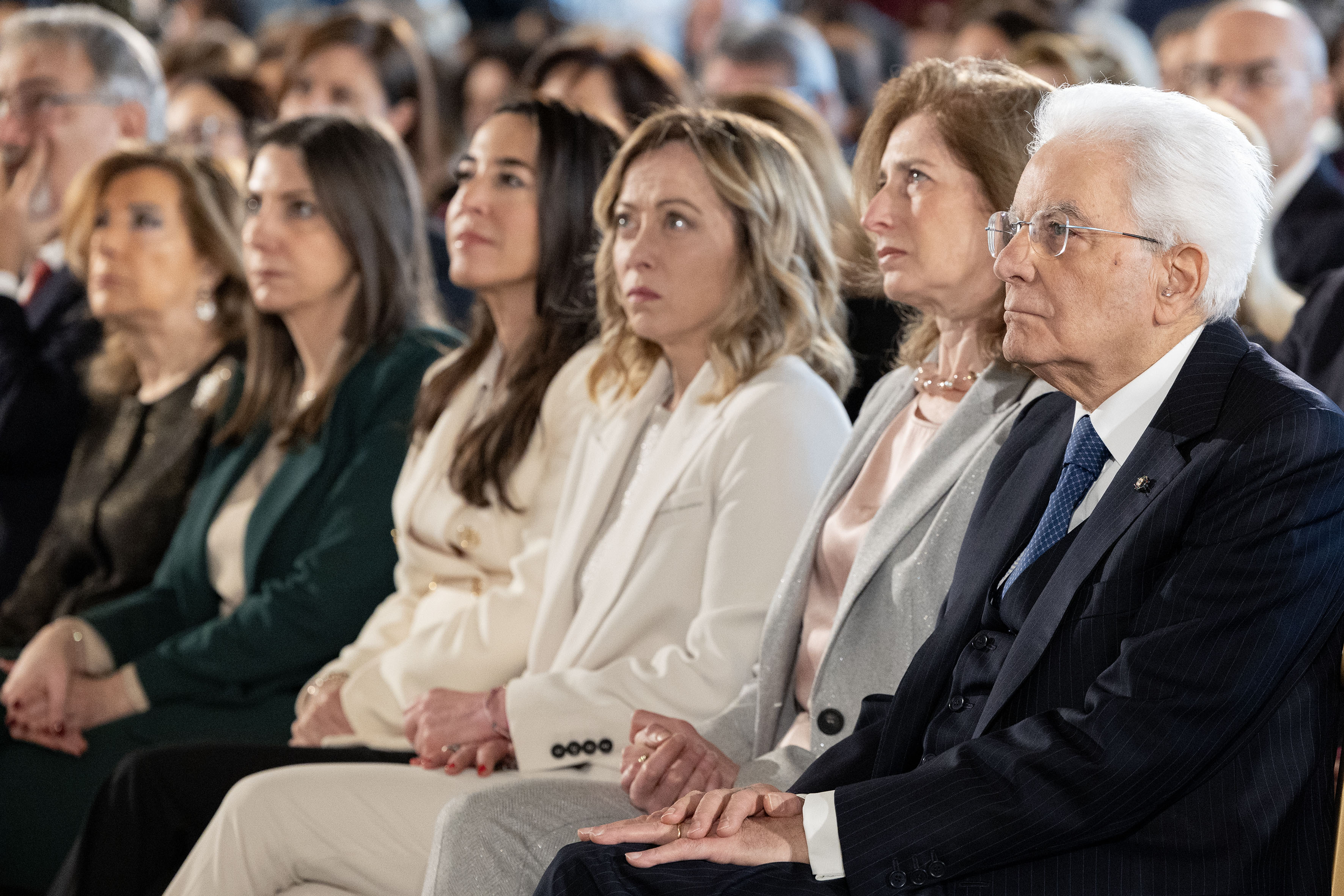
Giorgia Meloni, (third from right) the first female prime minister of Italy at a 2024 Women's Day event in Rome

On International Women's Day in 2024, a ceremony was held, presided over by France's President Emmanuel Macron, making France the first nation to guarantee the right to an abortion in their constitution; this had previously been approved by lawmakers.

The government of Ireland held two referendums on International Women's Day in 2024 on proposed amendments to the Constitution of Ireland. The Thirty-ninth Amendment of the Constitution (The Family) Bill 2023 proposed to expand the constitutional definition of family to include durable relationships outside marriage. The Fortieth Amendment of the Constitution (Care) Bill 2023 proposed to replace a reference to women's "life within the home" and a constitutional obligation to "endeavour to ensure that mothers shall not be obliged by economic necessity to engage in labour to the neglect of their duties in the home" with a gender-neutral article on supporting care within the family. However, both referendums were defeated, so the constitution was not amended.

Six couples recognized International Women's Day by suing the government of Japan for the right of a wife and husband to have different last names.

In Pakistan, there were rallies in major cities to bring attention to debt bondage, the scarcity of women in Parliament, and street harassment.

The Vulkangruppe, a German radical environmentalism group, described their March 2024 sabotage of a Tesla car manufacturing site in Berlin as a "present for March 8" because of its "anti-patriarchal motives", an allusion to ecofeminist principles.

== Around the world ==
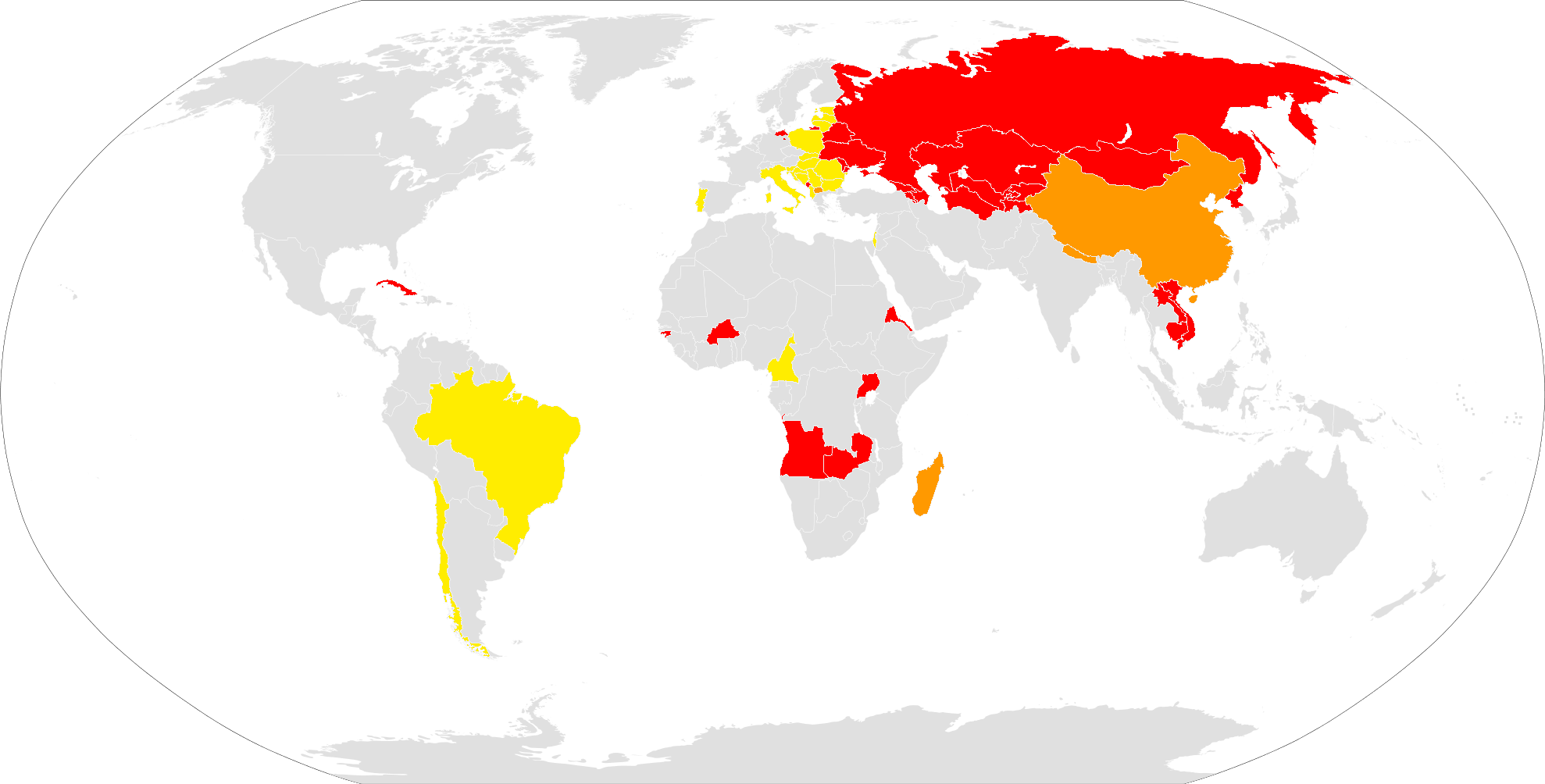
Official holiday Holiday for women Non-official holiday

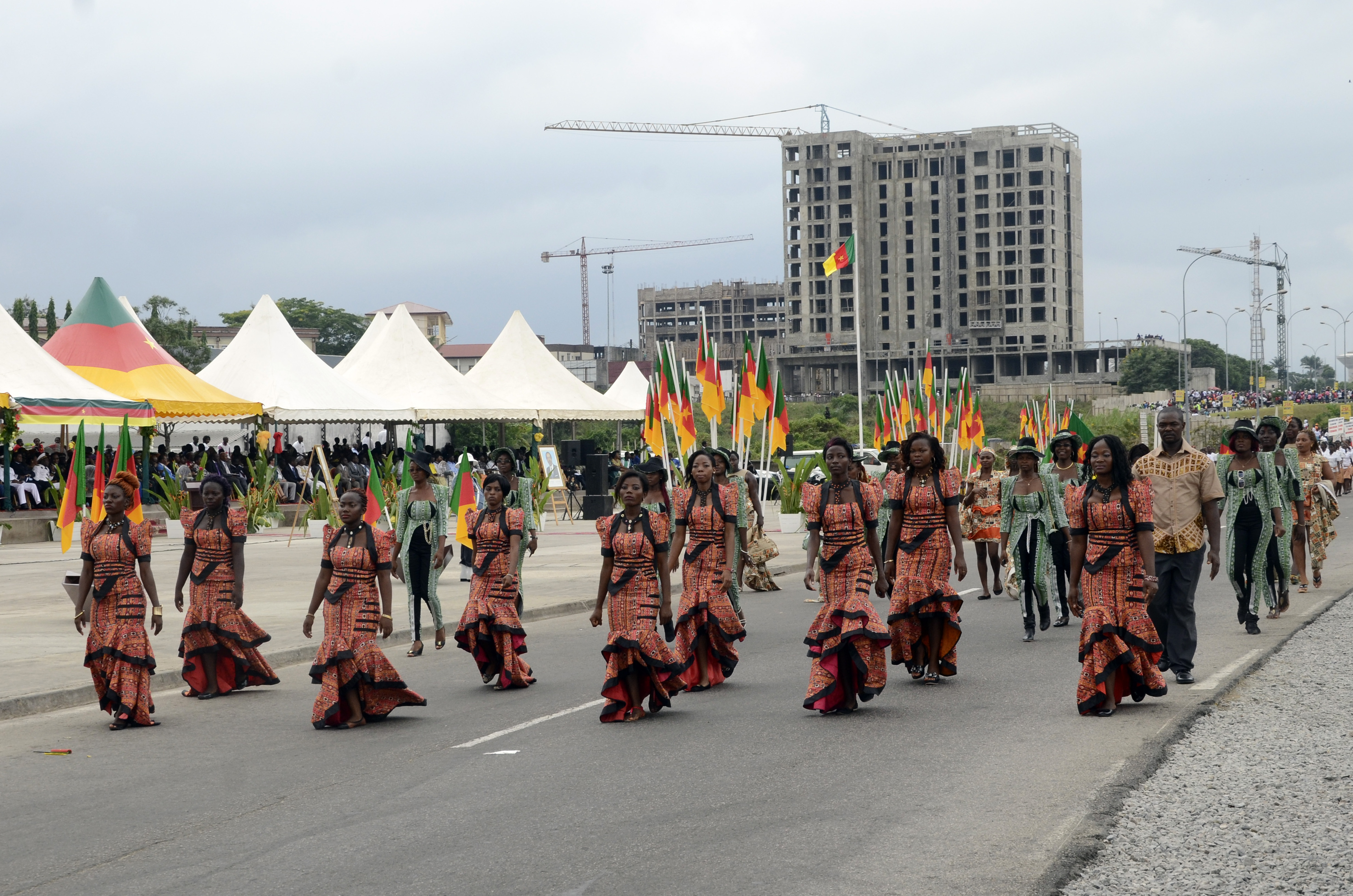
Women on the street celebrating International Women's Day in Cameroon

International Women's Day is an official holiday in many countries worldwide, including Angola, Armenia, Azerbaijan, Belarus, Burkina Faso, Cambodia, China (for women only), Cuba, Georgia, Germany (Berlin and Mecklenburg-Western Pomerania only), Guinea-Bissau, Eritrea, Kazakhstan, Kyrgyzstan, Laos, Madagascar (for women only), Moldova, Mongolia, Montenegro, Nepal, Russia, Tajikistan, Turkmenistan, Uganda, Ukraine, Uzbekistan, and Zambia.

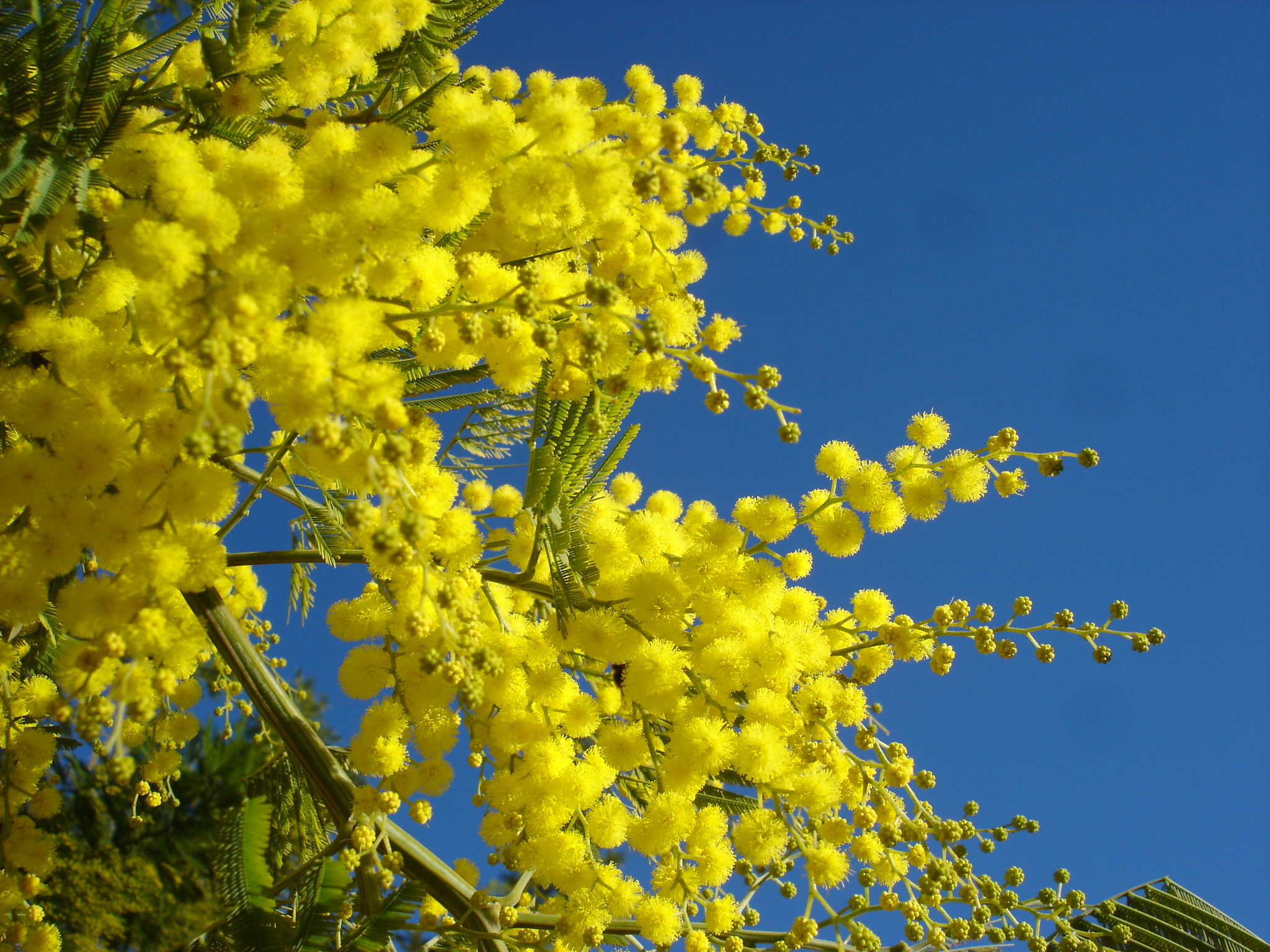
Yellow mimosa is the symbol of International Women's Day in Italy as well as in Russia, Ukraine and many other ex-Soviet Union republics

In some countries, such as Australia, Cameroon, Croatia, Romania, Bosnia and Herzegovina, Bulgaria, Vietnam, Chile, and Ghana, International Women's Day is not an official public holiday, but is widely observed, nonetheless.

Several countries, including Algeria, France, Italy, Spain, and Uruguay, have squares or other public spaces named after 8 March in reference to International Women's Day.

Regardless of legal status, in much of the world, it is customary for women and men to give their female colleagues and loved ones flowers and gifts on the day. In some countries (such as Bulgaria and Romania) it is also observed as an equivalent of Mother's Day, where children also give small presents to their mothers and grandmothers.

In the Czechoslovak Socialist Republic, huge Soviet-style celebrations were held annually. After the fall of Communism, the holiday, generally considered to be one of the major symbols of the old regime, fell into obscurity. International Women's Day was re-established as an official "important day" by the Parliament of the Czech Republic in 2004 on the proposal of the Social Democrats and Communists. This has provoked some controversy as a large part of the public as well as the political right see the holiday as a relic of the nation's Communist past.

International Women's Day is widely celebrated in France as the Journée internationale des droits des femmes (literally "International Women's Rights Day").

In Italy, the holiday is observed by men giving yellow mimosas to women. This originated with communist politician Teresa Mattei, who chose the mimosa in 1946 as the symbol of International Women's Day at the request of Luigi Longo. Mattei felt that the French symbols of International Women's Day, violets and lilies of the valley, were too scarce and expensive to be used in poor, rural Italian areas, so she proposed the mimosa as an alternative.

In the United States, since the 1980s actress and human rights activist Beata Pozniak worked with the Mayor of Los Angeles and the Governor of California to lobby members of the US Congress about International Women's Day, and she proposed the first official International Women's Day bill in the history of the US Congress. In 1994, per Pozniak's suggestion, the H. J. Res. 316 bill was introduced by Representative Maxine Waters, to recognize 8 March as International Women's Day.

In Pakistan, the first Aurat Marches were begun by women's collectives in parallel with the Pakistani#MeToo movement on International Women's Day. The first march was held on 8 March 2018 in Karachi. The Aurat March is now an annual socio-political demonstration in Pakistani cities such as Lahore, Hyderabad, Sukkur, Faisalabad, Multan, Quetta, Karachi, Islamabad and Peshawar to observe International Women's Day.

International Women's Day sparked violence in Tehran, Iran on 4 March 2007, when police beat hundreds of men and women who were planning a rally. A previous rally for the occasion was held in Tehran in 2003. Police arrested dozens of women, and some were released after several days of solitary confinement and interrogation. Shadi Sadr, Mahbubeh Abbasgholizadeh and several more community activists were released on 19 March 2007, ending a fifteen-day hunger strike.

== Official United Nations themes ==
Year	UN theme
1996	Celebrating the Past, Planning for the Future
1997	Women and the Peace Table
1998	Women and Human Rights
1999	World Free of Violence Against Women
2000	Women Uniting for Peace
2001	Women and Peace: Women Managing Conflicts
2002	Afghan Women Today: Realities and Opportunities
2003	Gender Equality and the Millennium Development Goals
2004	Women and HIV/AIDS
2005	Gender Equality Beyond 2005; Building a More Secure Future
2006	Women in Decision-making
2007	Ending Impunity for Violence Against Women and Girls
2008	Investing in Women and Girls
2009	Women and Men United to End Violence Against Women and Girls
2010	Equal Rights, Equal Opportunities: Progress for All
2011	Equal Access to Education, Training, and Science and Technology: Pathway to Decent Work for Women
2012	Empower Rural Women, End Poverty, and Hunger
2013	A Promise is a Promise: Time for Action to End Violence Against Women
2014	Equality for Women is Progress for All
2015	Empowering Women, Empowering Humanity: Picture it!
2016	Planet 50–50 by 2030: Step It Up for Gender Equality
2017	Women in the Changing World of Work: Planet 50-50 by 2030
2018	Time is Now: Rural and urban activists transforming women's lives
2019	Think Equal, Build Smart, Innovate for Change
2020	"I am Generation Equality: Realizing Women's Rights"
2021	Women in leadership: Achieving an equal future in a COVID-19 world
2022	Gender equality today for a sustainable tomorrow
2023	DigitALL: Innovation and technology for gender equality
2024	Invest in Women: Accelerate Progress
2025	For ALL Women and Girls: Rights. Equality. Empowerment
2026	Rights. Justice. Action.

== See also ==
- Aurat March (in Pakistan)
- Communist Women's International
- Day Without a Woman
- International Day for the Elimination of Violence against Women (25 November)
- International Day of Zero Tolerance for Female Genital Mutilation (6 February)
- International Day of the Girl Child (11 October)
- International Day of Women and Girls in Science (11 February)
- International Men's Day (19 November)
- International Non-Binary People's Day (14 July)
- Million Women Rise
- National Women's Day (disambiguation)
- UN Women
- Uprisings led by women
- Women's empowerment
- Women's History Month (in US)
- Women's March (disambiguation)
- Women's strike (disambiguation)

=== Other holidays honoring women and girls ===
- Ada Lovelace Day (second Tuesday in October)
- Harriet Tubman Day (10 March, US)
- Hinamatsuri (3 March, Japan)
- Helen Keller Day (27 June, US)
- National Girls and Women in Sports Day (one day first week of February, US)
- Rosa Parks Day (4 February / 1 December, US)
- Susan B. Anthony Day (15 February, US)
- Kartini Day (21 April, Indonesia)
- Mother's Day
- National Women's Day (9 August, South Africa)
- Ningol Chakouba (India)
- Nupi Lan Day (12 December, India)
- Women's Equality Day (26 August, US)
