= Christina F. Lewis =

Trinidadian community worker, women's rights activist and trade unionist (1919–1974)

- Born: Christina Felicia Lewis; 1919; San Fernando, in the British Crown Colony of Trinidad and Tobago
- Died: 21 November 1974 (aged 54–55); San Fernando, British West Indies, Trinidad and Tobago
- Occupations: Community worker, trade unionist, and women's rights activist
- Years active: 1939–1974

Christina F. Lewis (1919 – 21 November 1974) was an Afro-Trinidadian community worker, trade unionist and women's rights activist. Through her political activities, she worked to improve the conditions of workers and women, advocating for universal adult suffrage and for British citizens of the West Indies to have the same rights and privileges as their counterparts in Britain. As a socialist, Pan-Africanist, and feminist, she merged anti-colonial policies with the struggle for women's rights and against racism.

== Early life ==
Christina Felicia Lewis was born in 1919 in San Fernando, in the British Crown Colony of Trinidad and Tobago, to a Trinidadian mother and Grenadian father. She began her primary school at St. Paul's Anglican School and completed her studies at St. Gabriel's Girls' Roman Catholic School. After her graduation from primary school, Lewis continued her education in the British pupil-teacher system and studied shorthand and typing.

== Career ==
After completing her schooling, Lewis began working for Algernon Birkett, a self-trained, grassroots legal adviser to political activists seeking to broaden the democracy in Trinidad and Tobago. As a Pan-Africanist, Lewis joined the Negro Welfare, Cultural, and Social Association, which focused on poor administration and official corruption, as well as the issues of working-class people. She participated in protests over poor living conditions and worked throughout the Caribbean to address the issues of disenfranchised black citizens in the British West Indies, who though they were British did not enjoy the same rights and privileges as citizens in Britain. The government response to these protests were to ban leftist literature.

Lewis married in 1941, but divorced after two years and returned to her parents' home. Active in social improvement projects, Lewis was more radical than her contemporaries Audrey Jeffers and Marceline Archibald, who saw social work as a means to uplift poor, working-class women. Lewis did not accept that the poor needed charity from middle-class women and instead advocated for more progressive measures which broadened avenues of participation to apply to all classes of people. While Jeffers and Archibald maintained that educated black men and women should be integrated into the political system, they opposed universal adult suffrage. Lewis, on the other hand believed in Socialist policies which incorporated working-class people into the political system.

From the mid-1940s, Lewis was politically active and first joined the West Indian National Party. After their defeat in 1946, she switched her allegiance to the British Empire Citizens' and Workers' Home Rule Party. In 1947, she followed Ebenezer Joshua to St. Vincent and worked in his campaigns through 1952. Returning in 1953 to her native Trinidad, she became affiliated with the West Indian Independence Party and as a result was investigated for fomenting sedition against the state. She campaigned against racial discrimination and favoured a ban on comic strips such as Mandrake the Magician and The Phantom, which portrayed people of African descent in negative stereotypical roles. In this same period, Lewis became one of the founding members of the Caribbean Women's National Assembly (CWNA). The group worked to address women's issues, including violence against women and maternity leave for workers. On 8 August 1956, the CWNA formed the Domestic Workers Trade Union and Lewis urged members to insist on equal pay for equal work.

In addition to her political work, from 1956 to 1974, Lewis organized events for the underprivileged in San Fernando. Annually she hosted a Christmas dinner to feed the hungry and provided meals for up to 1,000 people. She also persuaded local musicians to stage performances at children's homes, Caura Chest Hospital in El Dorado and San Fernando General Hospital to bring cheer to those who were hospitalized or institutionalized during the holidays. In 1958, she organized the first International Women's Day in Trinidad and Tobago and that same year attended the 5th Congress of the Women's International Democratic Federation in China.

== Death and legacy ==
Lewis died on 21 November 1974 in an accidental shooting, when a security guard inadvertently discharged his weapon while she was conducting a business transaction at the National Insurance Scheme Office in San Fernando. Noted Caribbean researcher, Rhoda Reddock evaluated Lewis's philosophy, which linked anti-imperialism and feminism in her 1994 work, Women, Labour and Politics in Trinidad and Tobago. In 2009, James D. Cummings and the University of the West Indies, published a "well-researched" full biography, Christina Lewis: Her Life and Times, to preserve the significant history of her life.
