= Million Women Rise =

Annual women-only march in London

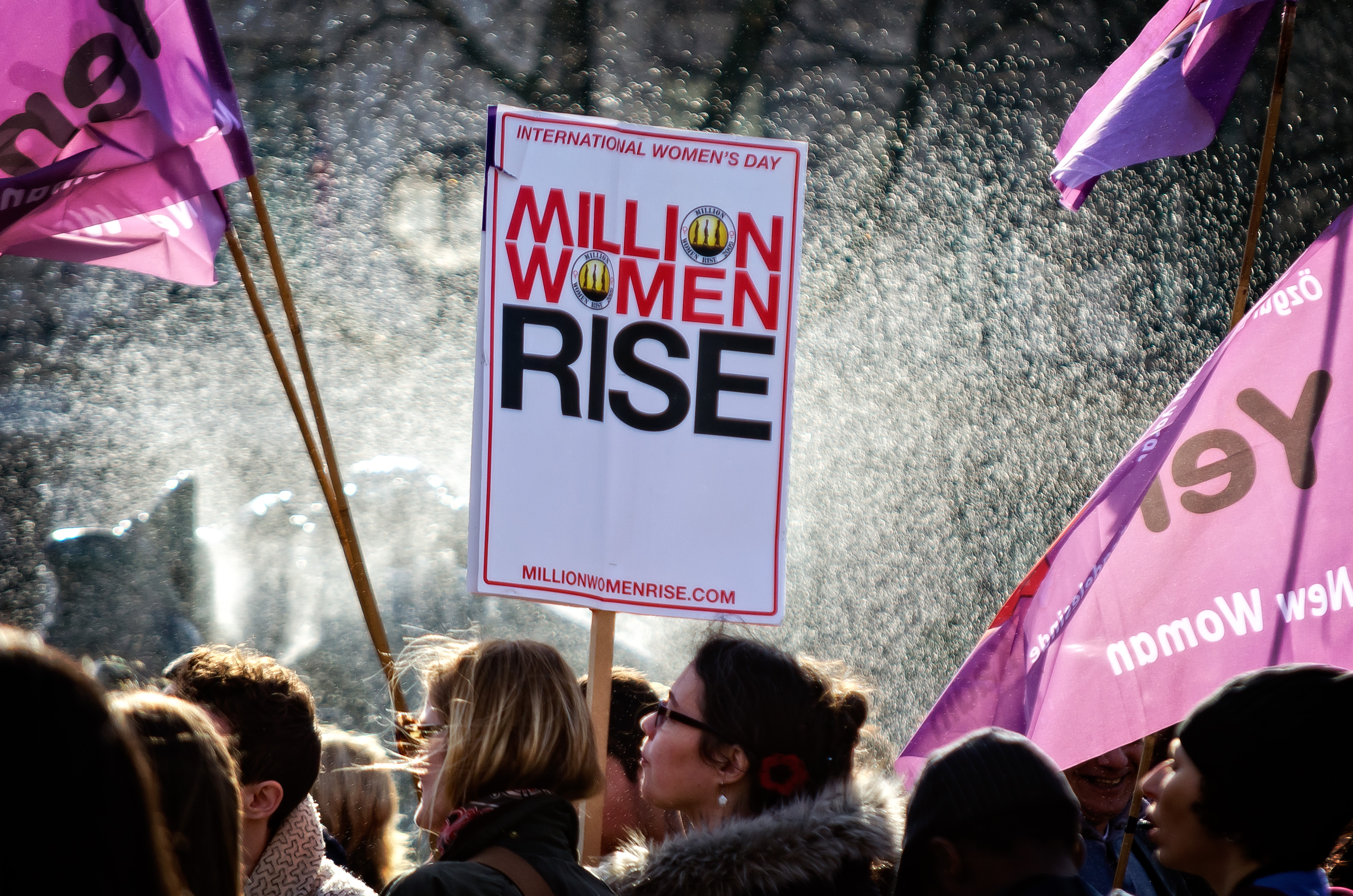
The Million Women Rise rally at London on Saturday 8 March 2014

Million Women Rise (MWR) is a women-only march and rally against violence against women, held annually in London on a Saturday close to International Women's Day, 8 March. It is followed by a rally in Trafalgar Square, which seeks to platform survivors of abuse and violence.

MWR has no corporate sponsors, and the organisers are grassroots activists without ties to large charities or NGOs. It was founded in 2007 by campaigner and former outreach worker Sabrina Qureshi, who drew inspiration from activism elsewhere in the world.

MWR argues that male violence against women and children is a global phenomenon which harms individuals and undermines sustainable development efforts.
