= Antimonumenta (Morelia) =

Anti-monument in Morelia, Michoacán

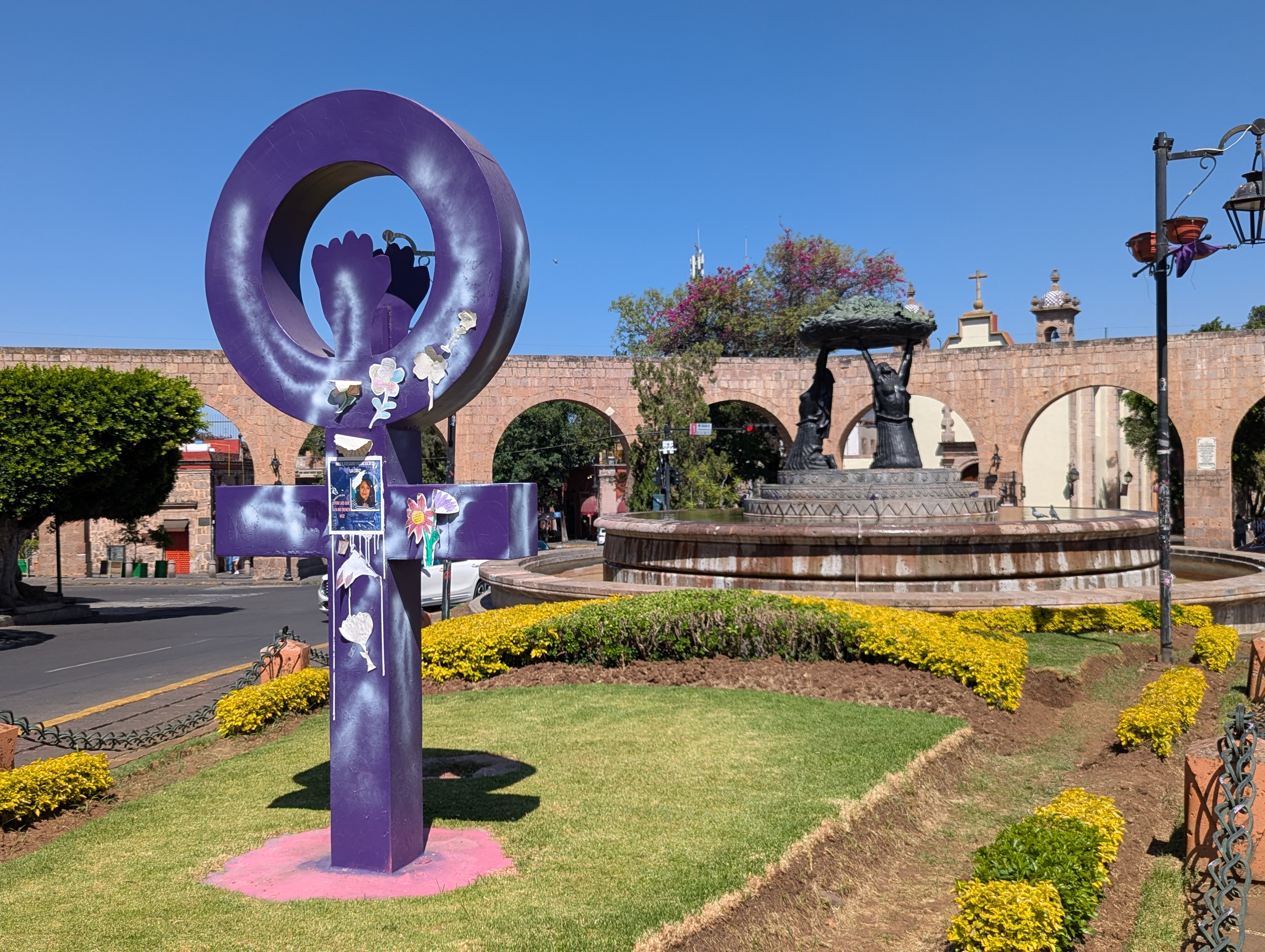
- The anti-monument in 2025
- Location
- Location: Mexico City, Mexico
- Coordinates: 19°42′10.4″N 101°10′57.2″W
- Designer: Feminists
- Type: Antimonumenta
- Material: Metal
- Opening date: 8 March 2021
- Dedicated to: Violence against women in Mexico

An antimonumenta was installed next to the Fuente de las Tarascas, along Francisco I. Madero Avenue in Morelia, Michoacán, on 8 March 2021, the date commemorating International Women's Day, during the annual march of women protesting against gender violence. The sculpture, symbolically named Antimonumenta, was inspired by other similar anti-monuments like the one in Mexico City. The erection of an antimonumenta symbolizes the demand for justice for women who suffer from violence in the country.

The original work was destroyed a few hours after its installation. A replica was installed the following month.

== History and installation ==
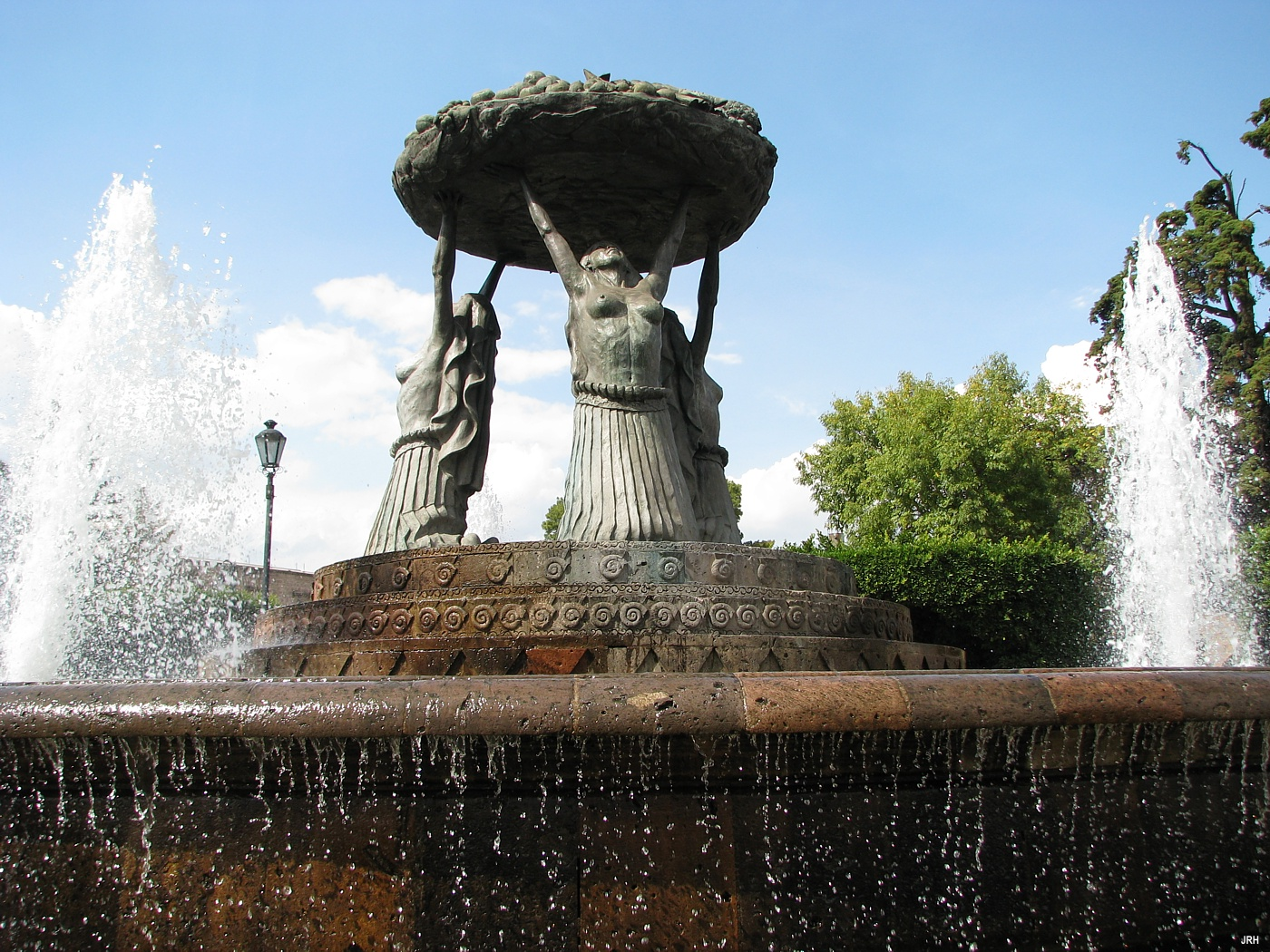
The Antimonumenta lies next to the Fuente de las Tarascas (pictured)

The Antimonumenta was erected by approximately 70 feminists, during the morning of 8 March 2021 on Francisco I. Madero Avenue, next to the Fuente de las Tarascas, in Morelia, Michoacán during the annual International Women's Day march of women protesting against gender violence. The installation of the structure lasted around 30 minutes.

During the night following its installation, the anti-monument was destroyed by unidentified females. The following morning, the installers went to the site to pick up the twisted metal and left flowers in its place, and on their social networks they said: "They took down the Antimonumenta in Michoacán, but today an altar was born in its place".

On the afternoon of 25 April of the same year, the collective installed a replica and commented that they will place it "as many times as necessary until women in Michoacán live free, happy and safe".

During the demonstrations on 2 October, in honor of the Tlatelolco massacre, two unidentified men vandalized the Antimonumenta and Las Tarascas Fountain with slogans referring to the 2014 Iguala mass kidnapping.

== Description and meaning ==
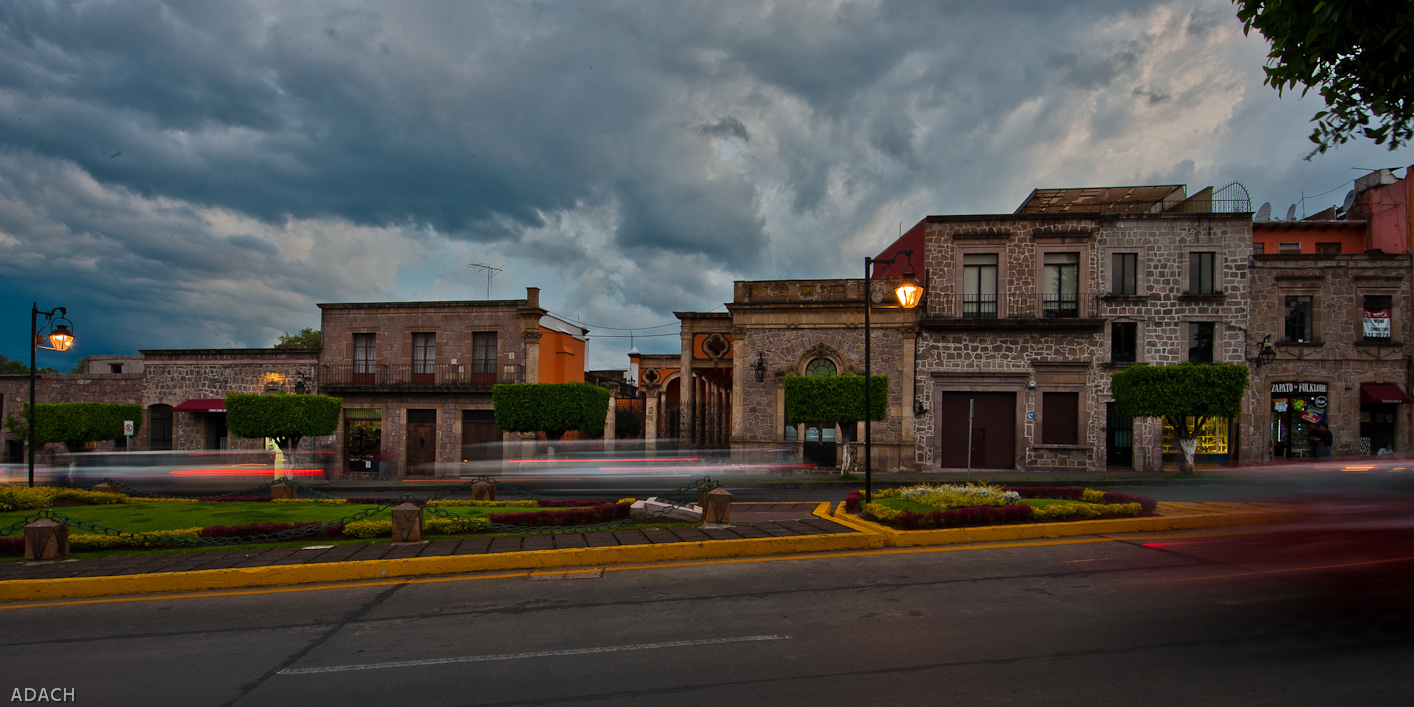
The location where the Antimonumenta was placed (pictured in 2014)

The original Antimonumenta was painted completely in purple and it was represented with the symbol of the feminist struggle, which is based on the symbol of Venus with a raised fist in the center. In feminism, the color represents "loyalty, constancy towards a purpose [and] unwavering firmness towards a cause". It was a metal sculpture whose upper part had written in Spanish, in violet capital letters: "Alive, free and happy", while on the arm of the cross it was written, "Not one more!". According to the installers, it represents the victims of femicide, as well as a method to invoke compassion, empathy and solidarity towards their cause.

== See also ==
- Antimonumenta (Guadalajara)
