= Concepción Feminist Mural =

Mural in Madrid, Spain

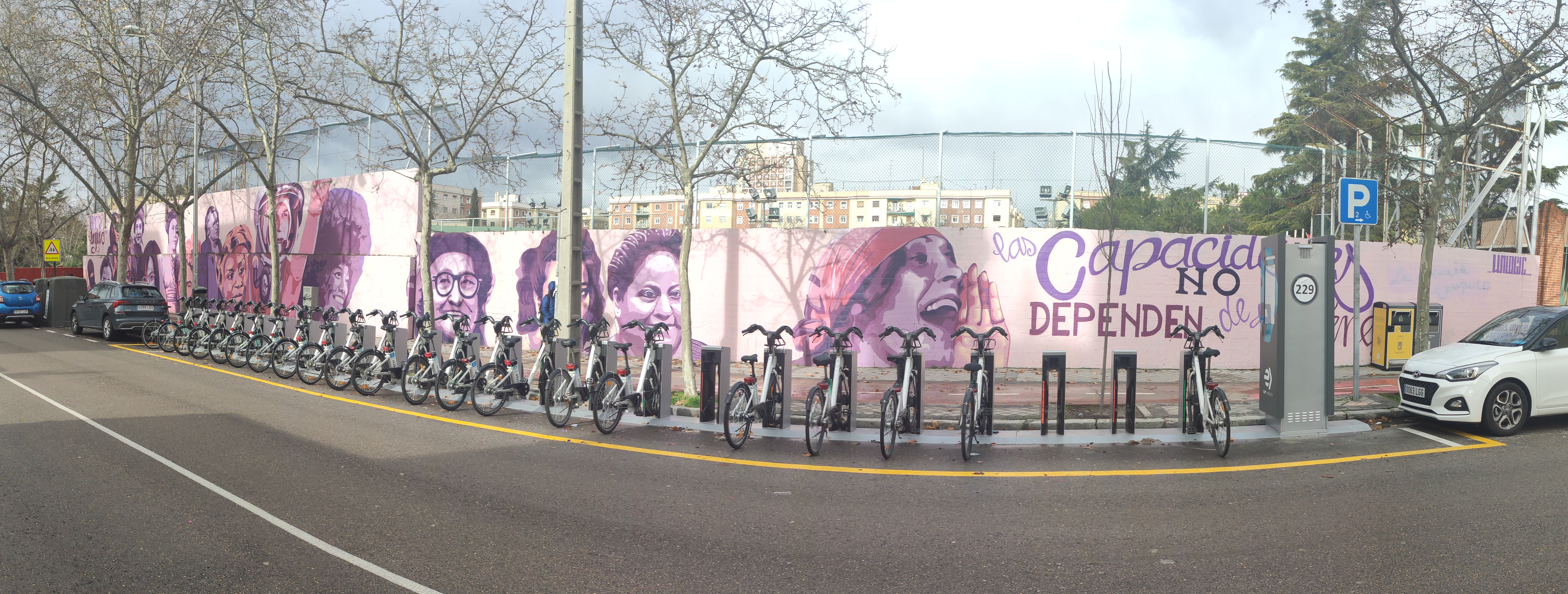
Panoramic view of the mural in the Municipal Sports Centre in the La Concepción neighbourhood.

The Concepción feminist mural is a mural painting entitled "La unión hace la fuerza" ("Unity is strength") by the Spanish collective Unlogic Crew on the exterior wall of the municipal sports centre in the Concepción neighbourhood of Madrid at Calle José del Hierro nº5. The project was selected in 2018 through a consultation on Decide Madrid and its design was developed with the participation of the neighbourhood of the district of Ciudad Lineal.

== History ==
In May 2018, La Mesa de Igualdad y Diversidad through the Permanent Commission of the Local Forum of the district of Ciudad Lineal made proposal no. 2018/444890 to create a pictorial mural against male violence at the entrance to the sports centre in the neighbourhood of La Concepción. Once the plenary session was over, the proposal was included in the project Compartiendo Muros (Sharing Walls) of the Madrid City Council's Department of Culture and Sports.

After going through a public consultation through the municipal portal for citizen participation Decide Madrid, where the project "Unity is strength " was presented, it was decided to award the mural to the art collective Unlogic Crew.

The mural, with the slogan 'Capabilities don't depend on your gender', was painted between 13 and 26 September, leaving the last three days for any neighbourhood resident to participate in its completion.

=== Attempted elimination and public reaction ===
In January 2021, the far-right political party Vox asked the Ciudad Lineal Municipal District Council to erase the mural because of its "political message". The proposal, which was approved on 21 January 2021 by the Partido Popular and Ciudadanos, who have been governing in coalition since 2019 in the Madrid City Council thanks to the support of Vox, included the replacement of the mural "with one dedicated to sportsmen and sportswomen and which does not contain any political message, only a sporting one".

The reaction of neighbourhood associations such as Valle Inclán de Prosperidad, Sol de la Conce, Asociación Vecinal de Quintana or the Asociaciones de Madres y Padres de Alumnos (AMPAs) of the schools Nuestra Señora de la Concepción, Carlos V, México, San Benito, Leopoldo Alas, Miguel Blasco Vilatela, San Juan Bosco, San Juan Bautista and Colegio Cultural Elfo was to reject the removal of this mural. The political parties Más Madrid, Podemos, PSOE and Izquierda Unida also opposed the decision.

Vox has carried out similar procedures to remove other left-wing symbols in the city of Madrid. At the beginning of 2021, the Carabanchel Municipal District Council debated the removal of the mural in homage to the 15-M movement in the Plaza de Oporto, although in this case the proposal did not succeed due to the abstention of Ciudadanos. Also, at the end of 2020, it managed to have the plaque dedicated to the politician and trade unionist Francisco Largo Caballero in the Plaza de Chamberí removed.

Neighbourhood organisations and activists linked to the neighbourhood and citizen initiatives of this type launched a social media campaign with the hashtags #ElMuralNoSeToca and #ElMuralSeQueda. In addition, a petition was created on Change.org calling for the mural not to be erased, which by Monday 25 January had 50,000 signatures. Apart from the digital actions, on 24 January 2021, various neighbourhood groups and activists in Madrid held a rally in front of the mural in protest at its future removal.

The attempted removal was covered by the international press, such as the British newspaper The Guardian, which called it a "cultural war", and was also criticised by Prime Minister Pedro Sánchez. Finally, on 26 January, the eight councillors of the Ciudadanos municipal group supported an emergency motion presented by Más Madrid to preserve the feminist mural.

=== Vandalisation of the mural ===
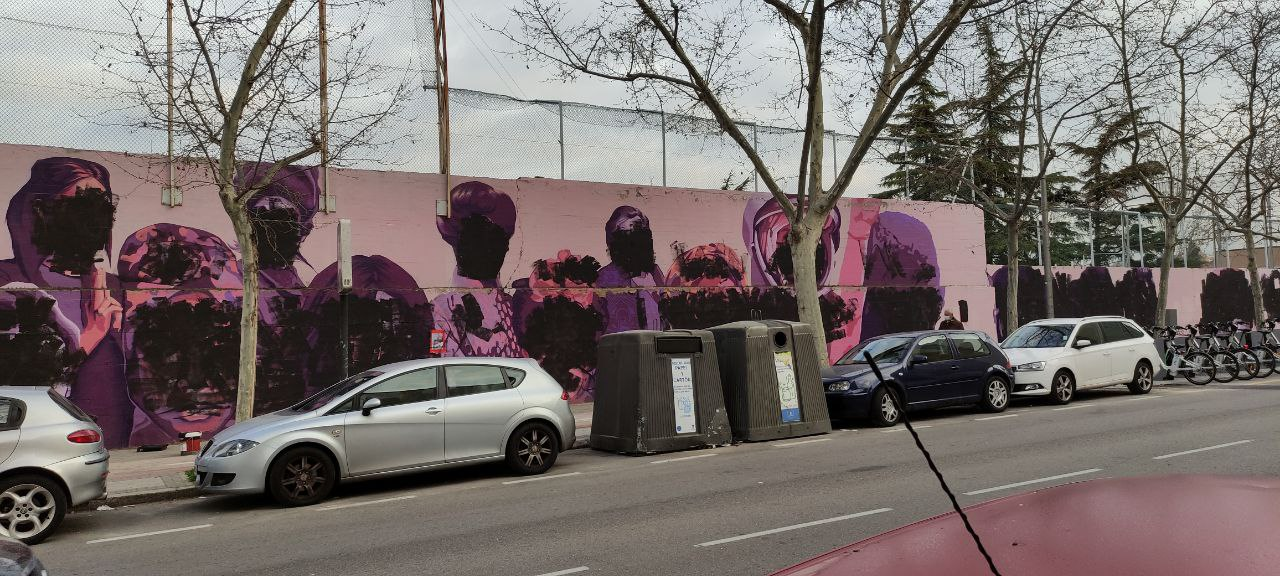
Vandalization of the feminist mural in Barrio De La Concepcion, on the 08th of March 2021

In the early hours of 8 March 2021, in commemoration of International Women's Day, the mural was vandalised by extreme right-wing groups who erased the message and covered the faces of the 15 women with black paint, also using banners that read 'Terrorist', 'Abortionist' and 'Communist'. Madrid City Council condemned the attack on the work and pledged to restore the mural.

=== Replicas ===
As a result of the attacks and attempts to destroy the mural, replicas have been made as a form of protest and support. A replica has been made in a secondary school in Puente Genil (Córdoba), another in Alcalá de Henares (commissioned by the local council) and another in Getafe Central Station. The latter two have also been vandalised.

== Women represented ==
In the mural, 15 women were depicted:

- Mexican activist Comandanta Ramona,
- African-American activist Rosa Parks
- Spanish poet and rapper Gata Cattana,
- American singer, songwriter and pianist Nina Simone,
- Soviet sniper who fought against the Nazis Liudmila Pavlichenko,
- American actress Emma Stone as former tennis player Billie Jean King,
- Japanese journalist Kanno Sugako,
- Mexican painter and activist Frida Kahlo,
- Russian anarchist activist Emma Goldman,
- Nigerian writer Chimamanda Ngozi Adichie,
- Soviet cosmonaut Valentina Tereshkova,
- African-American politician and activist Angela Davis,
- Spanish feminist activist Rosa Arauzo, a Ciudad Lineal resident and defender of women's equality,
- Spanish anarcho-syndicalist activist and anti-Franco fighter Antònia Fontanillas Borràs,
- and the Guatemalan indigenous leader and Nobel Peace Prize winner Rigoberta Menchú.

=== Gallery ===
Details of the feminist mural at La Concepción

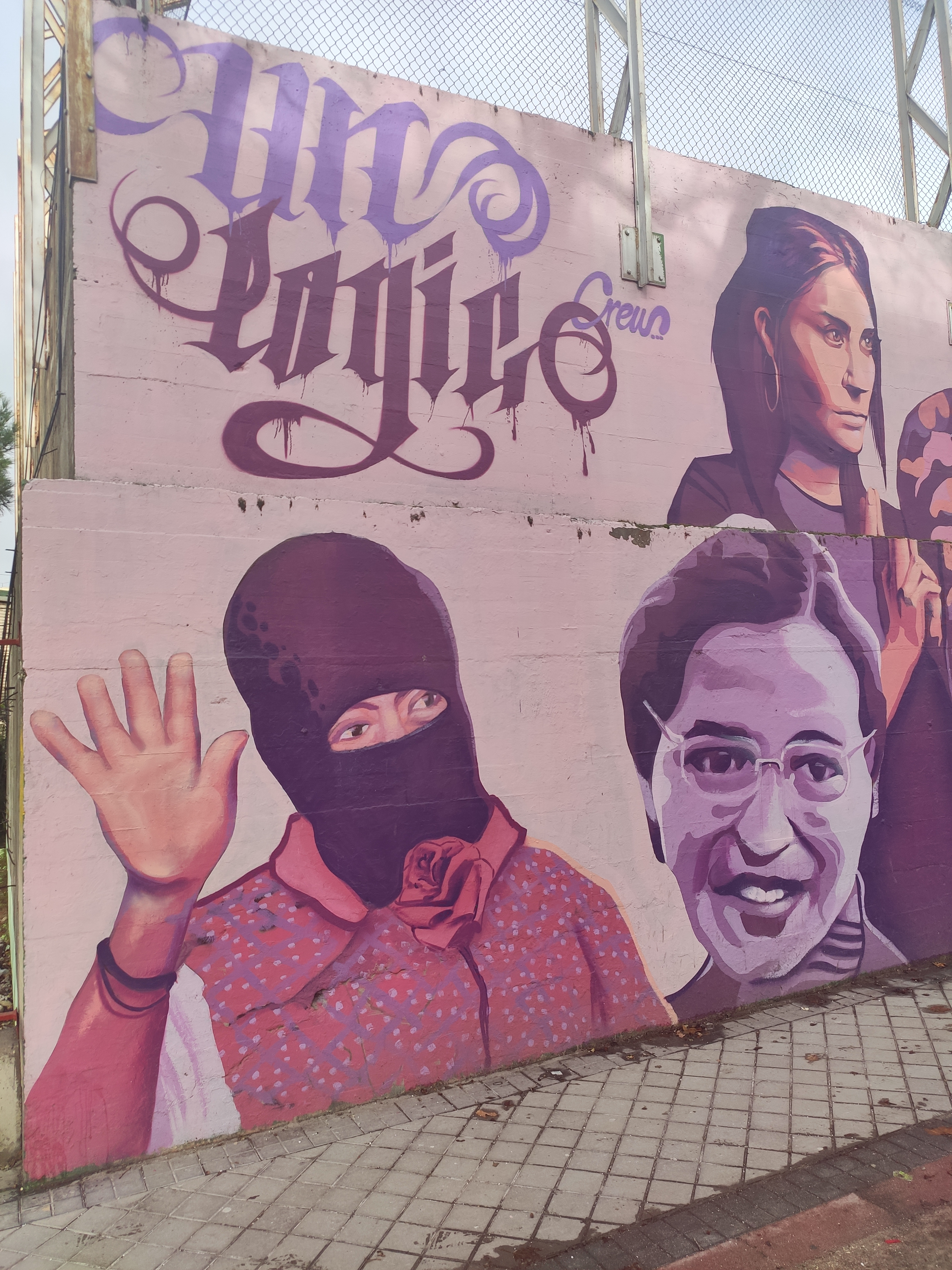
Comandanta Ramona, Rosa Parks, Gata Cattana

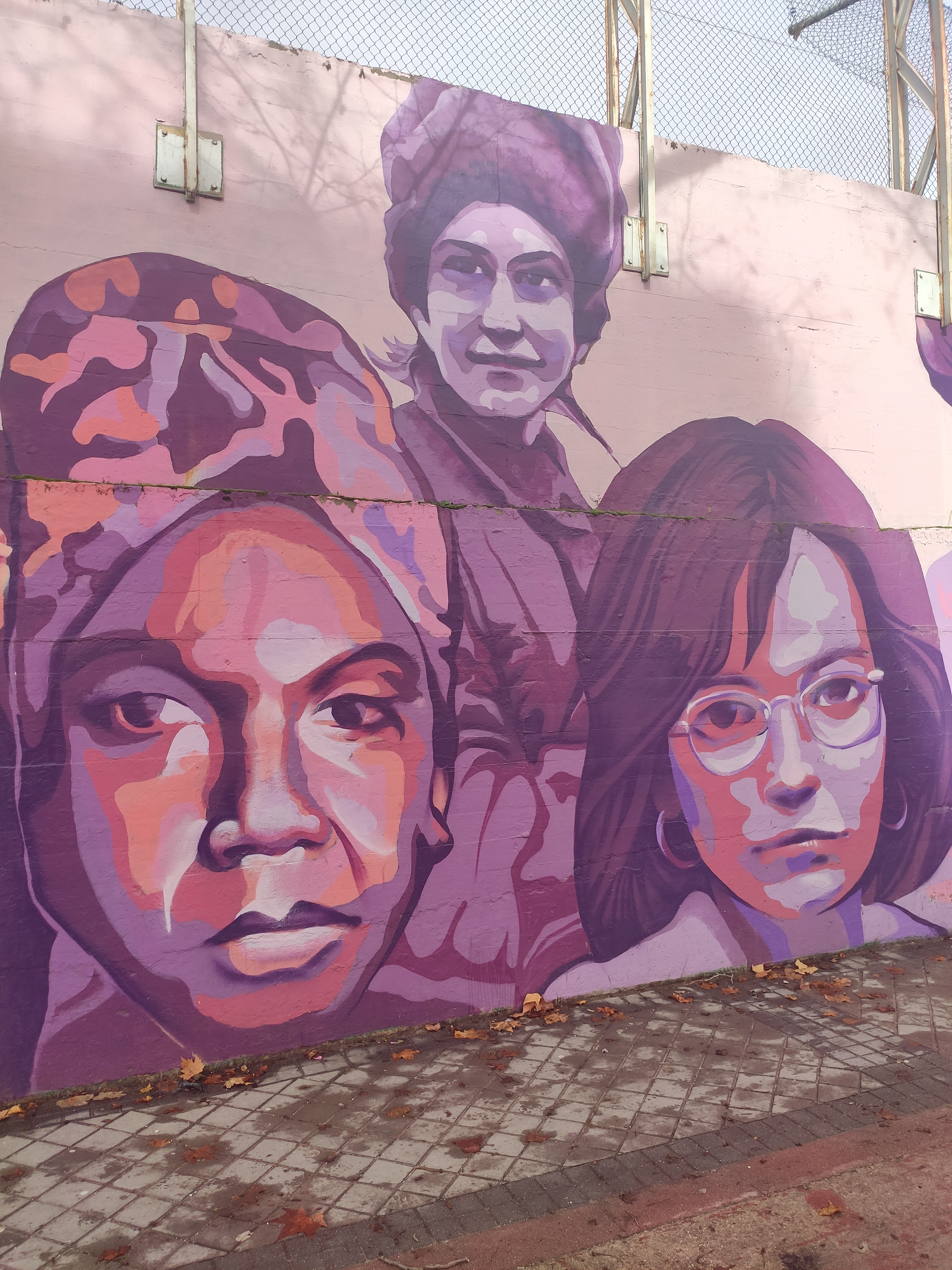
Nina Simone, Liudmila Pavlichenko, Billie Jean King

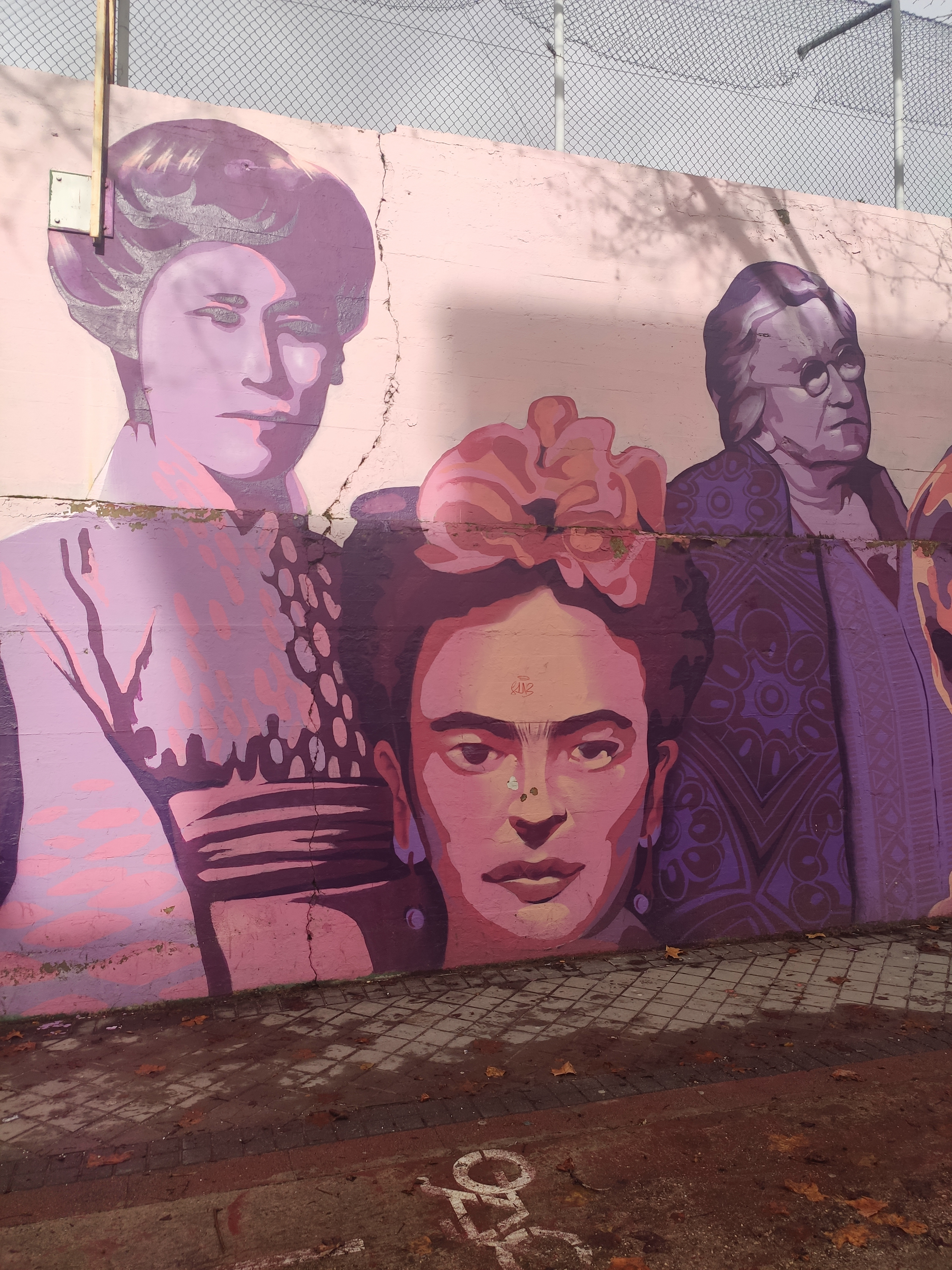
Kanno Sugako, Frida Kahlo, Emma Goldman

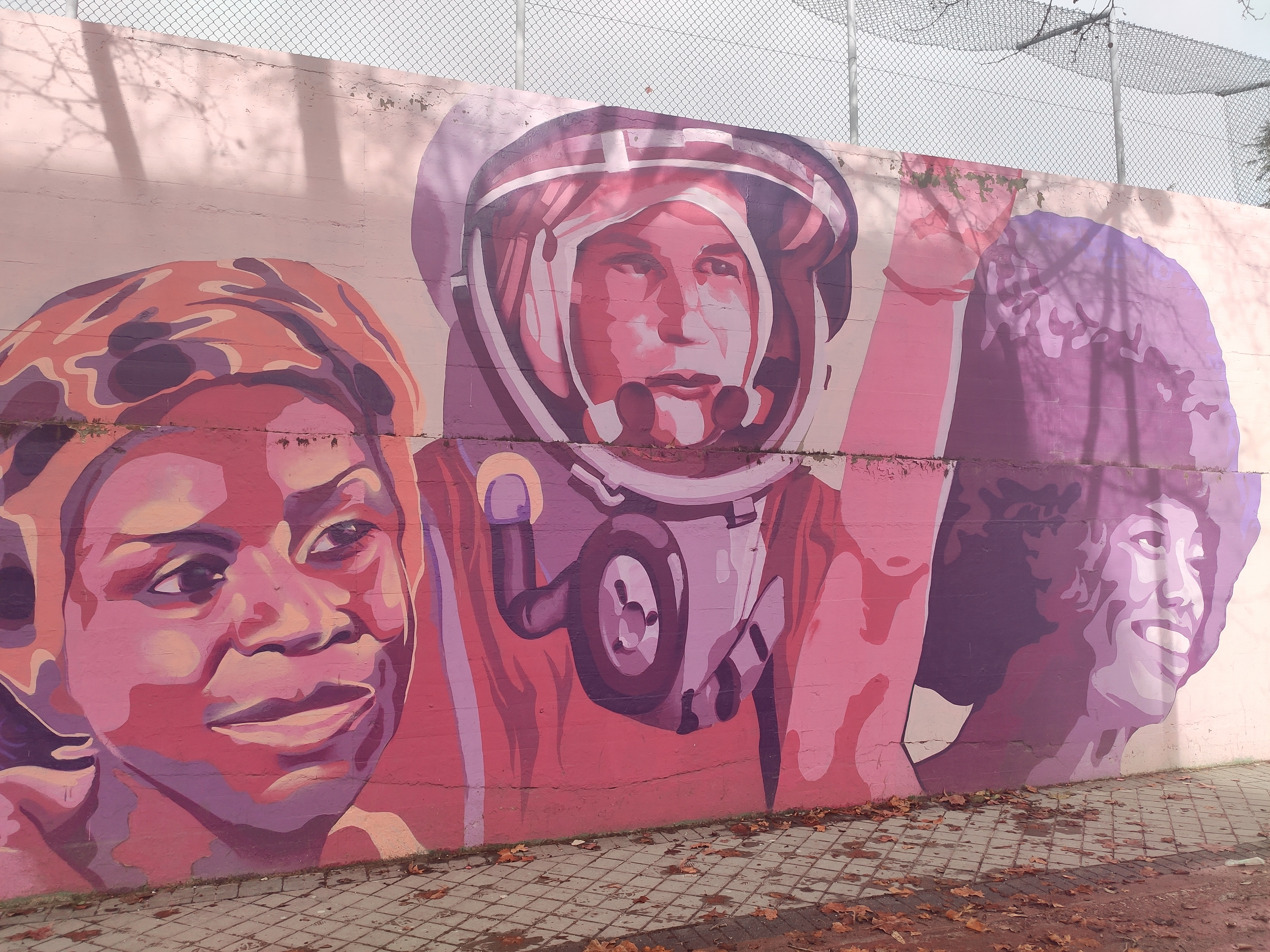
Chimamanda Ngozi Adichie, Valentina Tereshkova, Angela Ivonne Davis

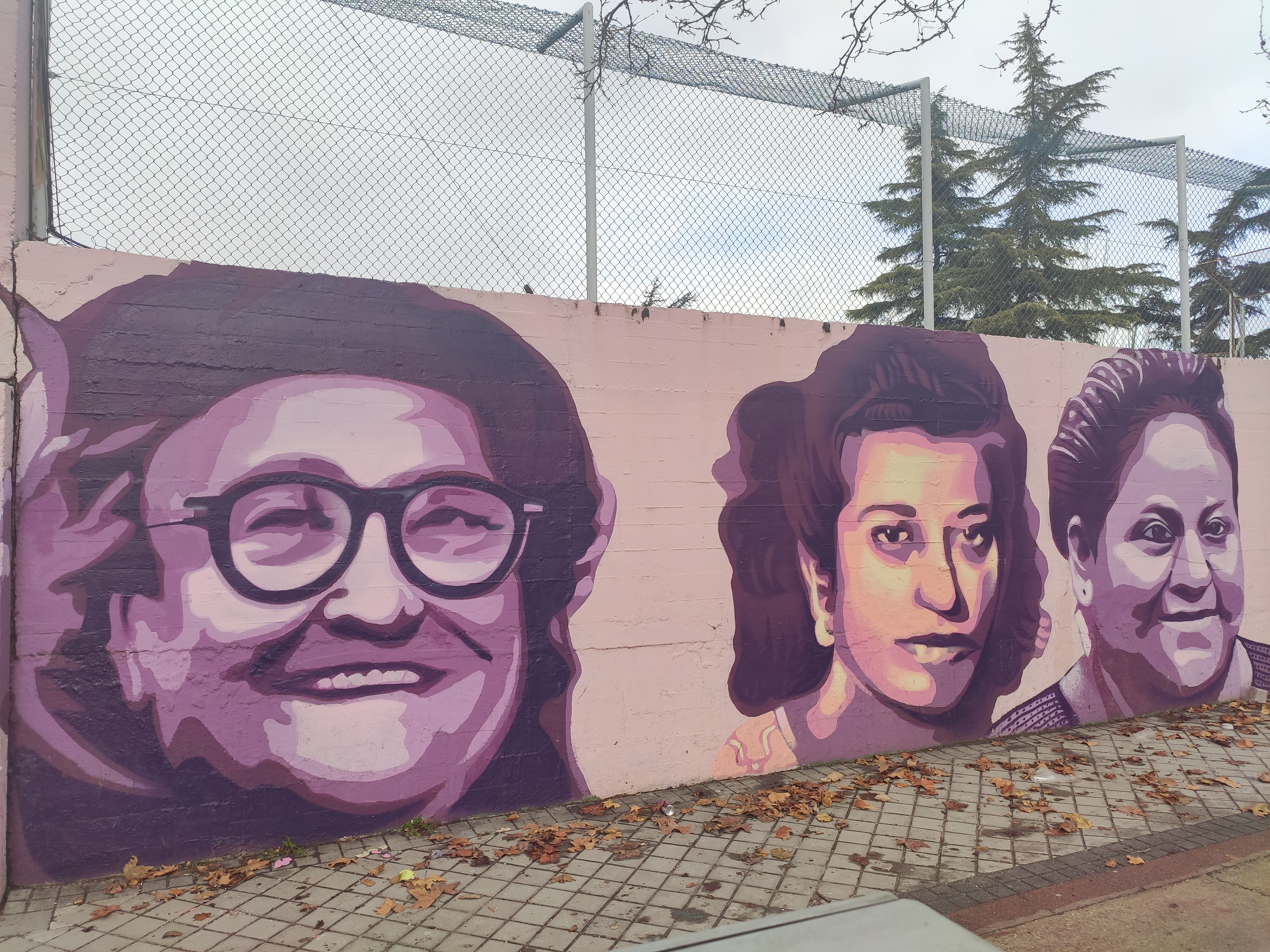
Rosa Arauzo, Antònia Fontanillas Borràs, Rigoberta Menchú
