= Fuente de las Tarascas =

Fountain and sculpture in Morelia, Michoacán, Mexico

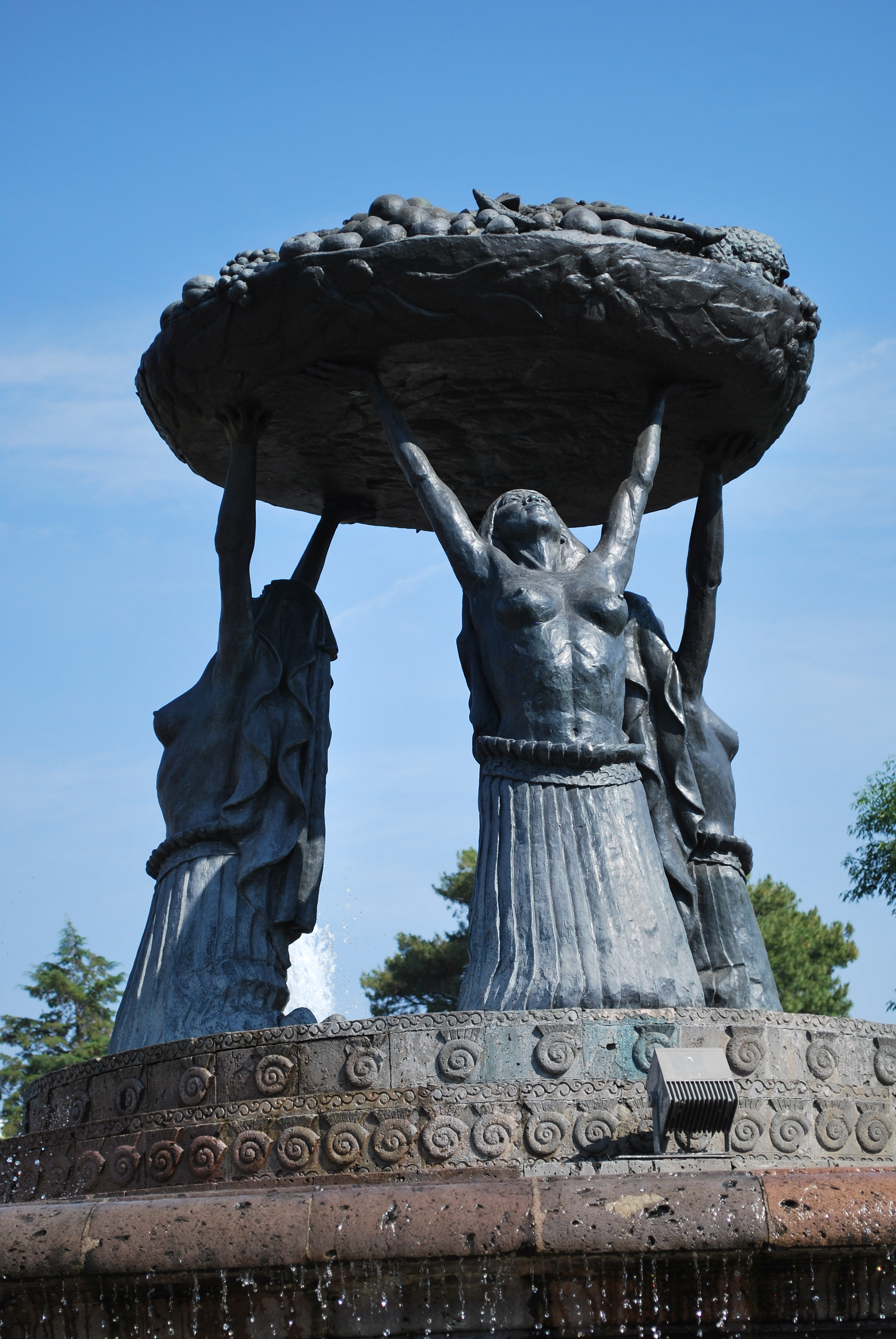
- The sculpture in 2012
- Location
- Artist: Antonio Silva Díaz (artist, 1931); Benigno Lara (sculptor, 1931); José Luis Padilla Retana (sculptor, 1984)
- Year: 1931 (Díaz and Lara); 1984 (Padilla)
- Medium: Concrete (Díaz and Lara); Bronze (Padilla)
- Location: Morelia; 19°42′10.3″N 101°10′56.7″W
- Website: michoacan.travel/las-tarascas-fountain

The Fuente de las Tarascas (Las Tarascas Fountain), also known as the Fuente de la Fertilidad (Fertility Fountain), is a fountain, sculpture and landmark installed in Morelia, Michoacán, Mexico. The original work was created by Antonio Silva Díaz and Benigno Lara and was installed in 1931 in the intersection of Francisco I. Madero Avenue and Acueducto Avenue, in the historic center of the city. The fountain had three colorful concrete statues that depicted three bare-chested, kneeling women holding a basket of fruits. The sculpture was replaced in 1965 by another work.

In 1984, a similar work, but sculpted in bronze by José Luis Padilla Retana, was installed where the original sculpture used to be placed. It features the same subject, but it is now believed to represent three Purépecha (externally known as "Tarascan") princesses named Atzimba, Eréndira and Tzetzangari. Like the original work, they are bare-chested and hold a basket of regional fruits.

There are two replicas installed internationally; in Buenos Aires, Argentina, and Kansas City, United States.

== History and description ==
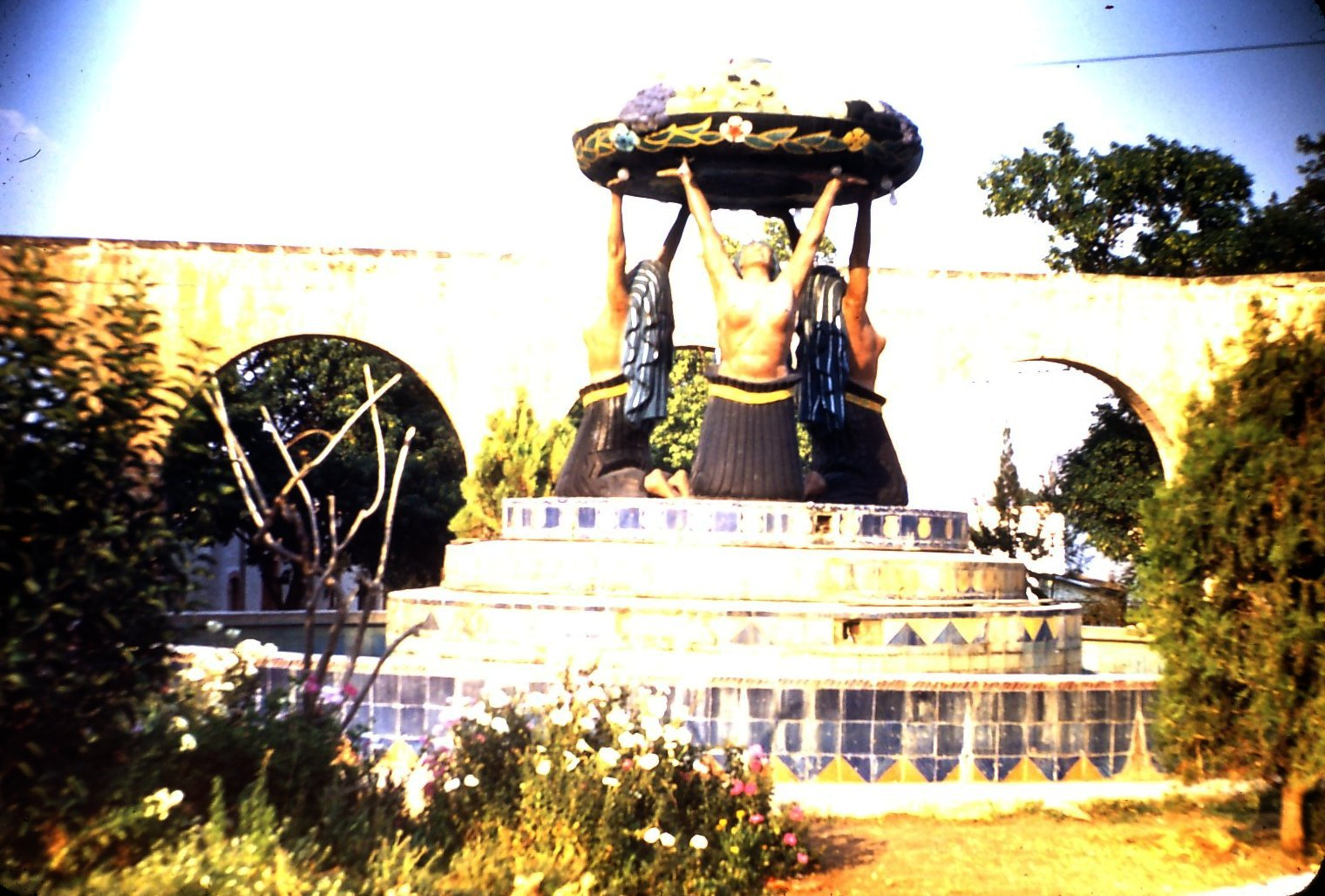
The original fountain in 1948

The original fountain was installed next to the city's aqueduct in October 1931 and featured a colorful concrete sculpture. It was a work by Antonio Silva Díaz and Benigno Lara. It featured three bare-chested kneeling women holding a basket of fruits. They wore blue rebozos on their heads and skirts of the same color. The meaning of the work was never explained and they never received an official name. Citizens commonly referred to them as "Fuente de las Indias" (Indians Fountain), but the government later promoted them as the "Fuente de las Tarascas" (Tarascans Fountain) after the Indigenous group found in the state of Michoacán. The sculptures received criticism for being naked. On 25 August 1965, the sculptures were removed and were transported to the offices of the State Treasury, 800 m (2,600 ft) away from their original location. They were removed as the municipal president, Fernando Ochoa Ponce, considered them to be out of harmony with the area and lacked any value or meaning. They were replaced by a fountain named El Huarache by Ángel Díaz. Since 1967, the original sculpture is located at Expo Feria Morelia. At some point, the fair changed its location and the sculpture was moved to the new site. However, the fruit bowl was permanently damaged. It was replaced with a smaller version.

Due to the unpopularity of El Huarache, between 1983 and 1984, José Luis Padilla Retana was requested to sculpt statues similar to the originals. They feature three bare-chested women speculated to represent the Purépecha princesses Atzimba, Eréndira and Tzetzangari. According to the legends, Atzimba was exiled after she fell in love with a Spaniard explorer; Eréndira was a leader and a heroine that fought against the Spanish conquistadors; Tzetzangari filled Lake Zirahuén with her tears. Their faces are based on that of a woman from Yunuén Island, Michoacán, while their bodies were invented by Padilla Retana. They hold a basket of regional fruits (including apples, maize and avocados) which they raise to the sky as a sign of prosperity, abundance, and fertility of the earth and mankind. The statues were installed on 18 May 1984. The replacement was paid for with people's donations. El Huarache was moved instead to a garden in the colonia of Lomas Hidalgo, in Morelia.

== Impact ==
In 2016, a book named Las Tarascas was published. It is based on research done by Elsa María Zertuche Zapata regarding the history of the modern fountain, from its installation where it replaced a previous statue, the rumors of the theft of one of the sculptures, as well as the political impact of the sculptures.

Due to its location in Morelia, the fountain receives constant vandalism and is a frequent site of protests.

=== Replicas ===
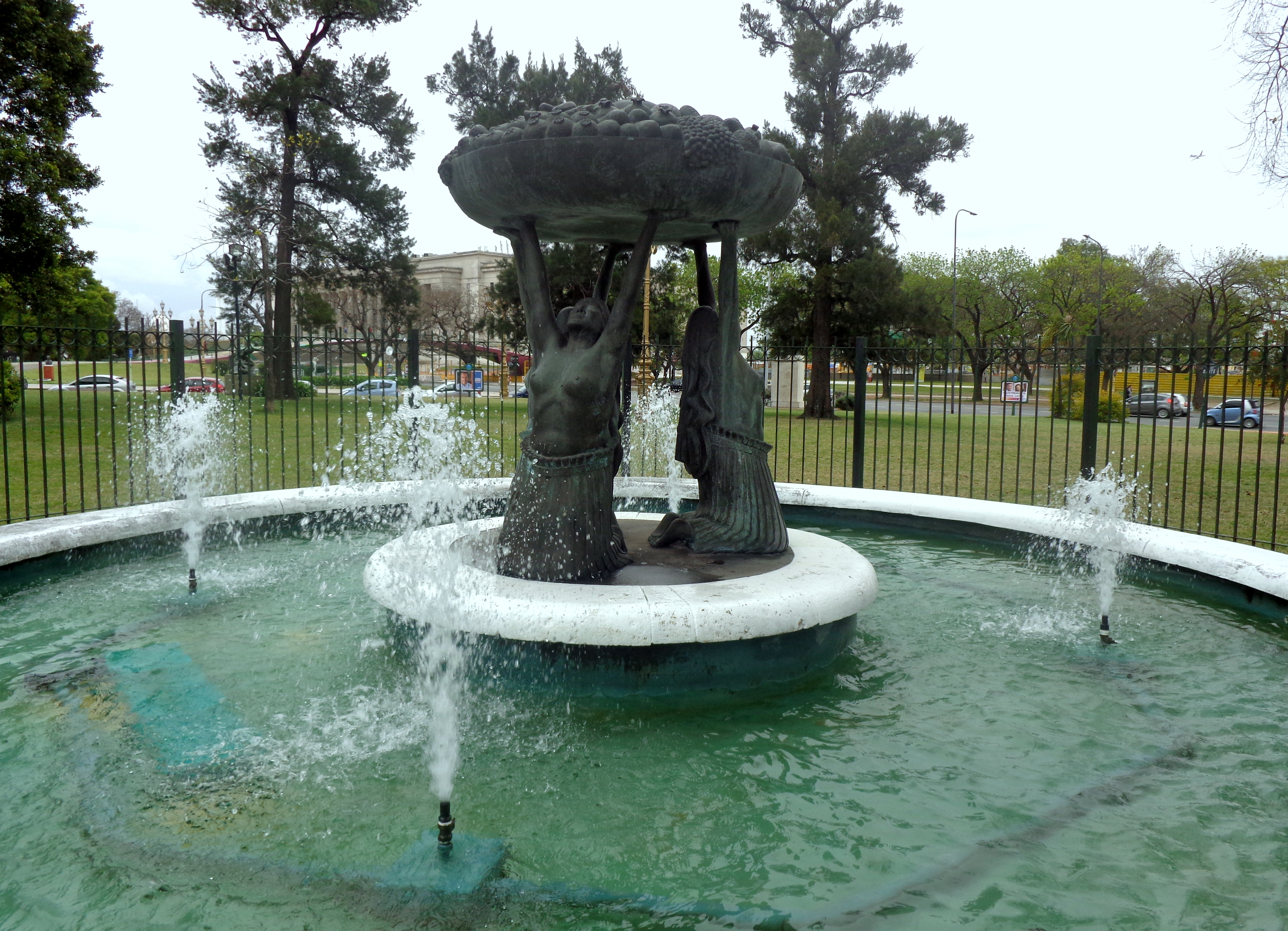
The replica in 2015

After the 1984 installation, the fountain became a landmark and one of the most emblematic places in Morelia. The state government donated a replica by José de los Santos Sánchez Martínez to the government of Buenos Aires, Argentina, which was installed on 17 December 1998.

A replica was installed in Kansas City, Missouri, United States, on 21 June 2026.

== See also ==
- Antimonumenta (Morelia), a 2021 anti-monument placed next to the fountain.
