= List of historic houses in Missouri =

This is a list of historic houses in the U.S. state of Missouri.

== Columbia area ==
- David Guitar House, Columbia, Missouri
- William B. Hunt House, Columbia, Missouri
- John N. and Elizabeth Taylor House, Columbia, Missouri
- Maplewood, Columbia, Missouri
- Moses U. Payne House, Columbia, Missouri
- Greenwood, Columbia, Missouri
- David Gordon House and Collins Log Cabin, Columbia, Missouri
- Samuel H. and Isabel Smith Elkins House, Columbia, Missouri
- East Campus Neighborhood, a NRHP district consisting of mostly houses, in Columbia, Missouri
- Sanford F. Conley House, Columbia, Missouri
- John W. Boone House, Downtown Columbia, Missouri
- Chatol, Centralia, Missouri
- Albert Bishop Chance House and Gardens, Centralia, Missouri

== North Central ==
- George Caleb Bingham House, Saline County, Arrow Rock, Missouri
- Boyhood Home of General John J. Pershing, Linn County, Laclede, Missouri

== Northeastern Missouri ==
- Boyhood Home of Mark Twain, Marion County, Hannibal, Missouri
- "Champ" Clark House, Pike County, Bowling Green, Missouri

== Kansas City area ==
- The John Wornall House Museum, Kansas City, Missouri, 1858 Greek Revival
- Harry S. Truman Farm Home, Jackson County, Grandview, Missouri
- Rice-Tremonti House, Jackson County, Raytown, Missouri - 1844 Gothic Revival frame home
- William Moore Cabin, Ess Road, Jackson County, Missouri - 1823 log cabin
- Atkins-Johnson Home, Gladstone, Clay County, Missouri - 1824 log cabin, incorporated into larger home 1853

== Lexington ==
- Aullwood Mansion, Lafayette County, Lexington, Missouri—1904 Georgian mansion
- Anderson House, Lafayette County, Lexington, Missouri—1853 Greek Revival mansion
- Linwood Lawn, Lafayette County, Lexington, Missouri -- circa 1853 Italianate estate

== Springfield Area ==
- Tiny Town was a park village of miniature houses in 1925
- Laura Ingalls Wilder Home and Museum, Wright County, Mansfield, Missouri

== St. Joseph ==
- Patee House, Buchanan County, Saint Joseph, Missouri

== St. Louis area ==
- Campbell House, St. Louis, Missouri
- Chatillon-DeMenil House, St. Louis, Missouri
- Cupples House, St. Louis, Missouri
- Joseph Erlanger House, St. Louis, Missouri
- Eugene Field House, St. Louis, Missouri
- Scott Joplin House, St. Louis, Missouri
- Shelley House, St. Louis, Missouri
- Tower Grove House, St. Louis, Missouri

== Ste. Genevieve ==
- Felix Vallé House State Historic Site, Ste. Genevieve, Missouri—c1818 Colonial, Federal style
- Beauvais-Amoureux House, Ste. Genevieve, Missouri—c1792 French Colonial
- Bequette-Ribault House, Ste. Genevieve, Missouri—c1790s French Colonial
- Louis Bolduc House, Ste. Genevieve, Missouri—circa 1785 French Colonial
- Jacques Guibourd Historic House, Ste. Genevieve, Missouri—c1806 French Colonial
- Old Louisiana Academy, Ste. Genevieve, Missouri—c1808 Colonial, Federal style

== Gallery ==
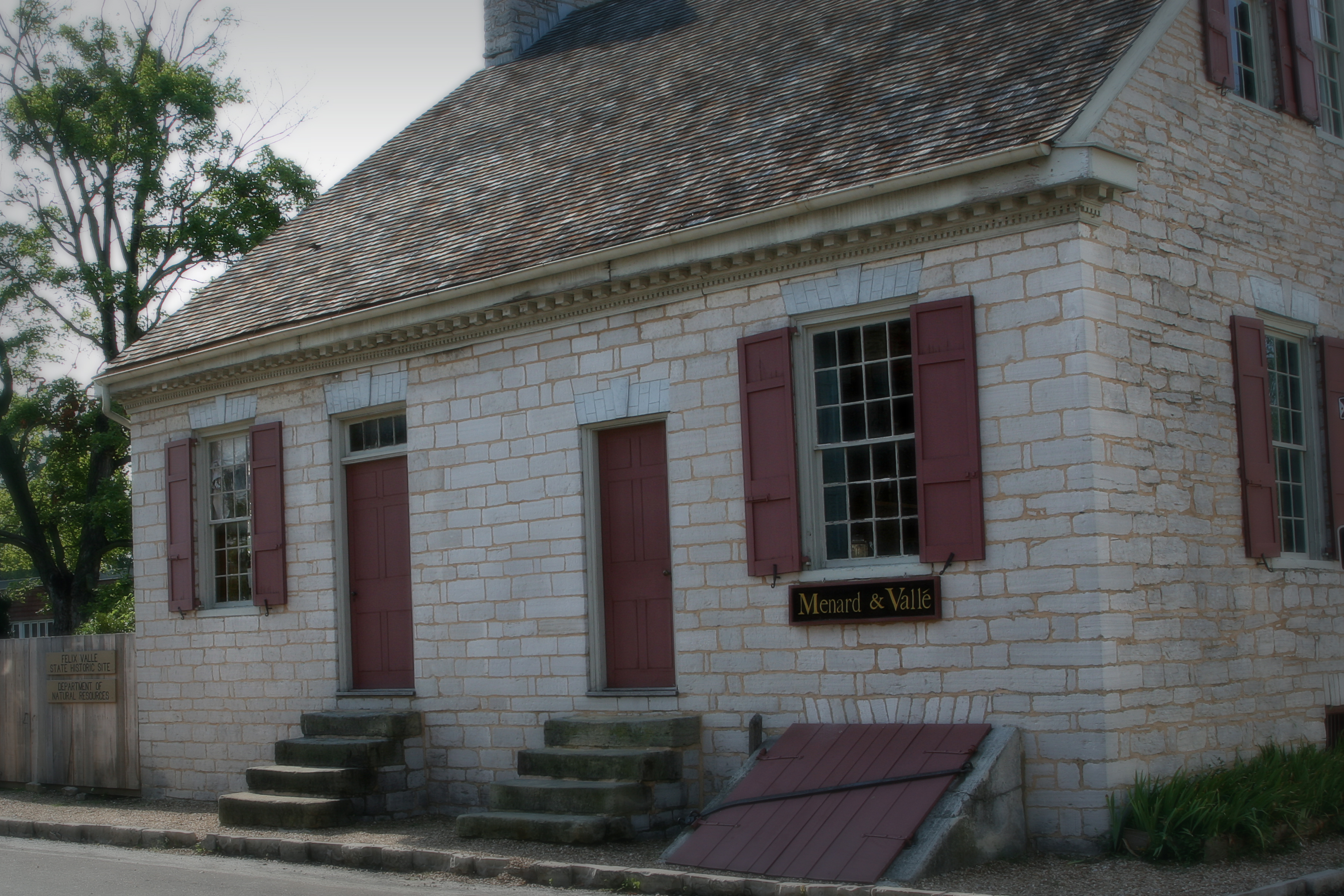
Historic 1818 home of Felix and Odile Vallé and trading firm of Menard and Vallé.

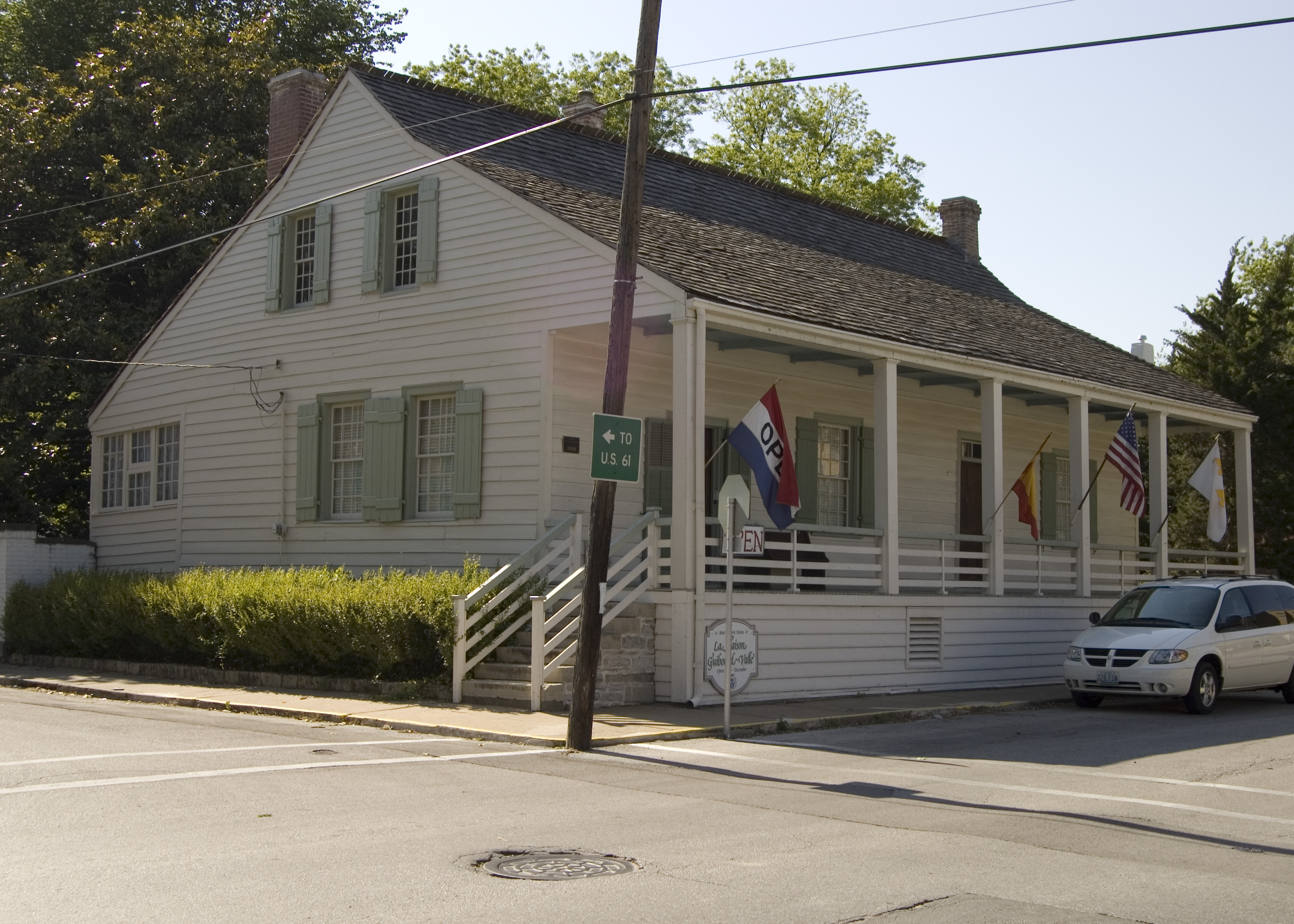
Historic 1806 home of Jacques Jean Rene Guibourd.

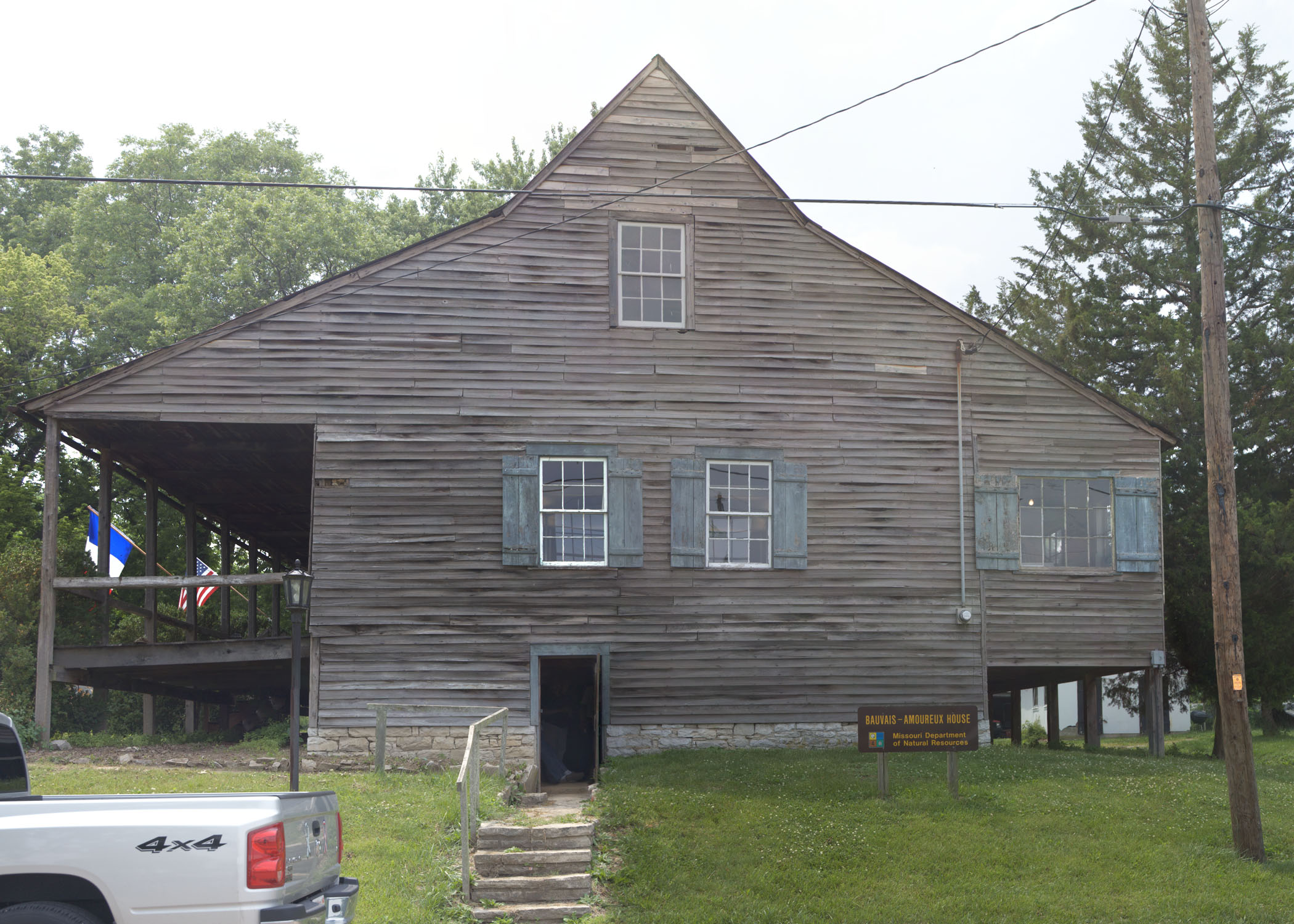
The Amoureux House.

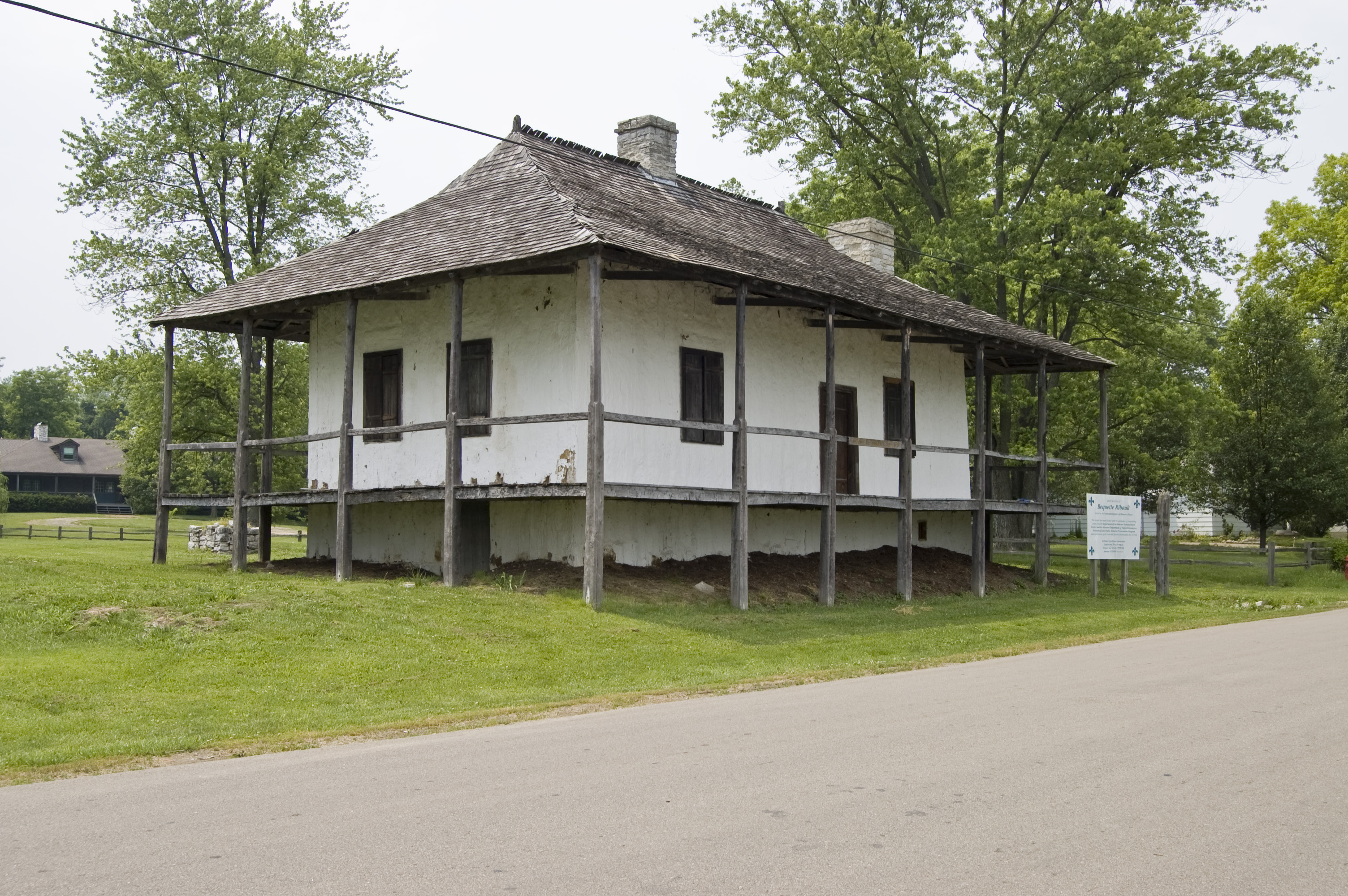
Maison Bequette-Ribault after restoration.

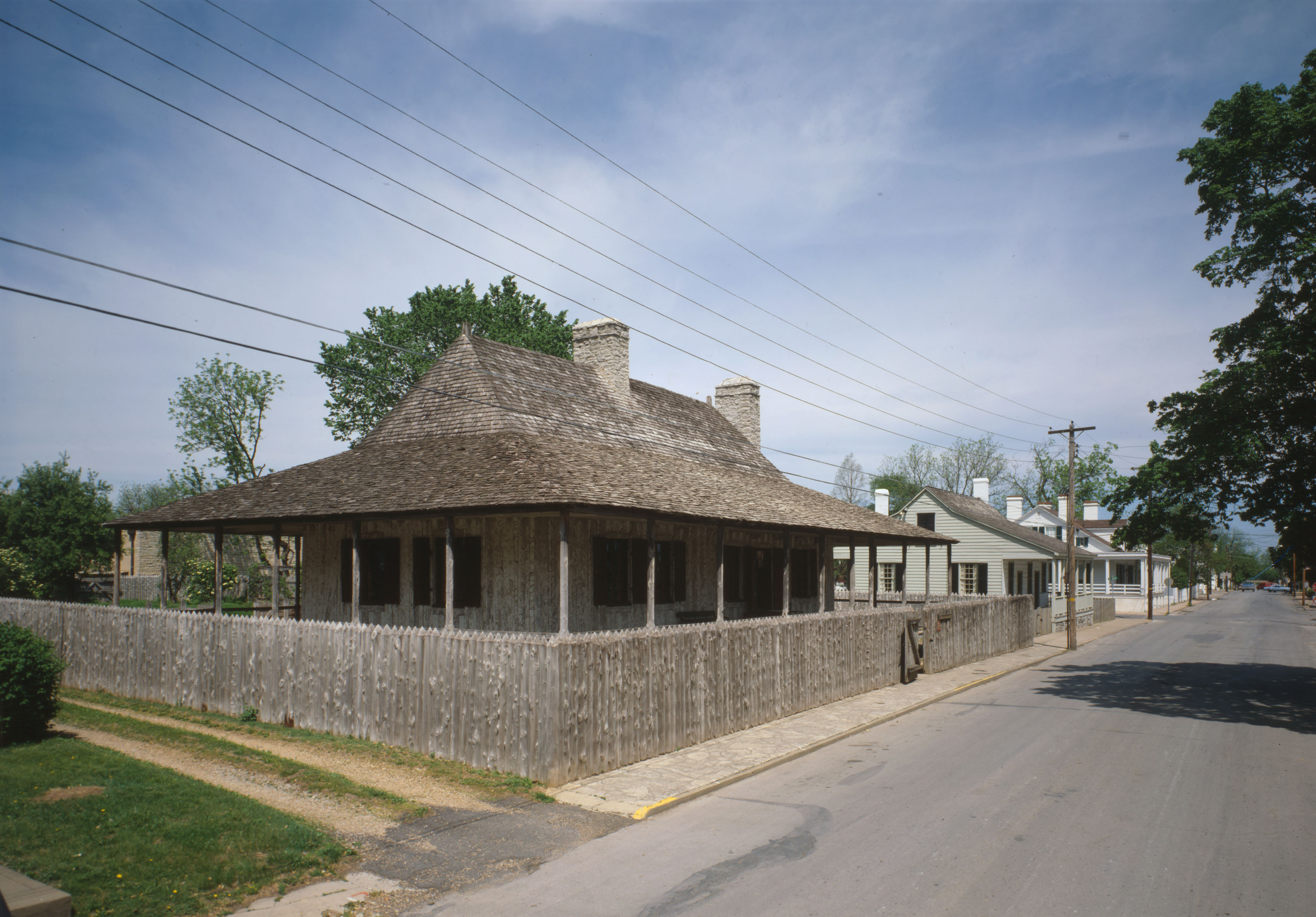
The Bolduc House.

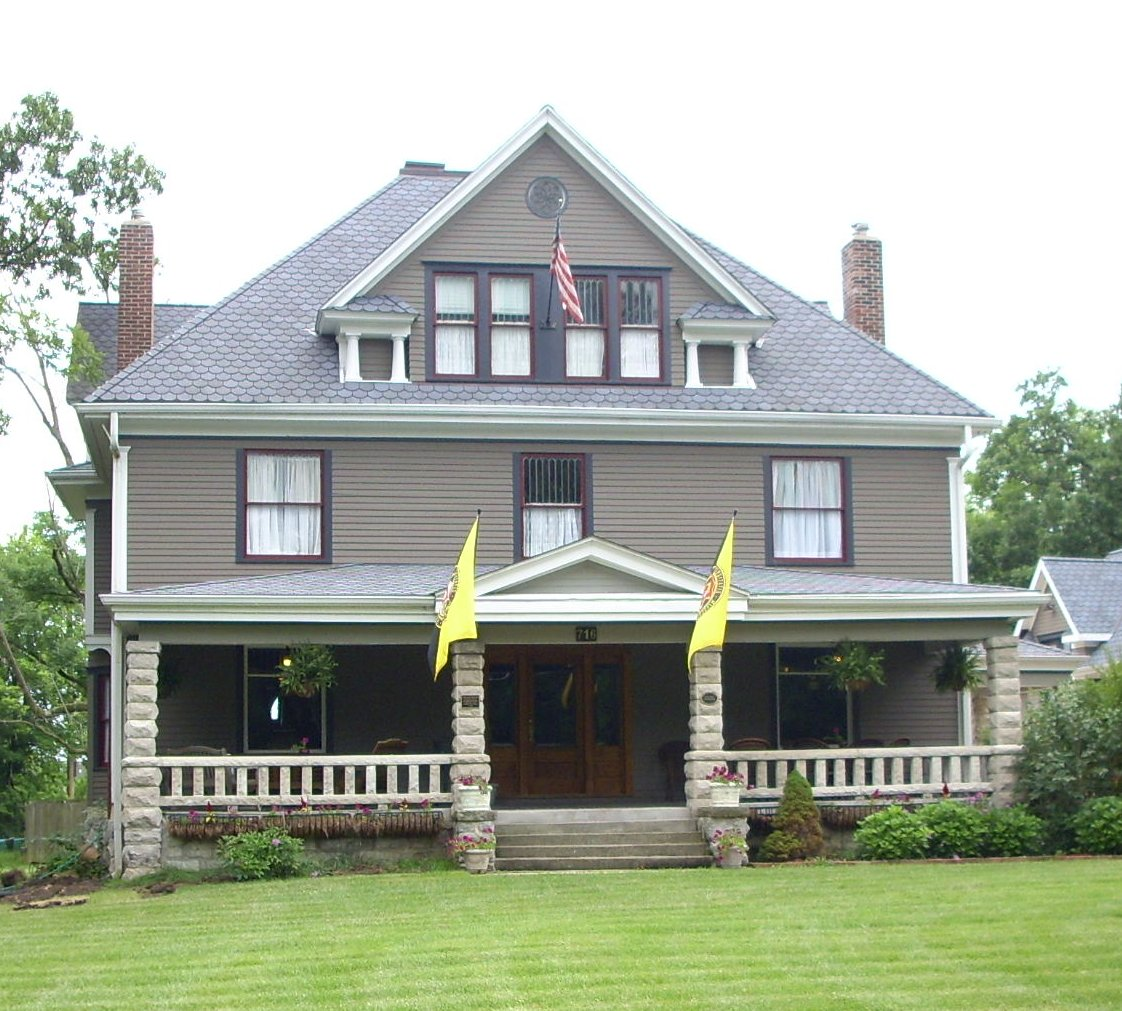
The John N. and Elizabeth Taylor House in Columbia, Missouri.

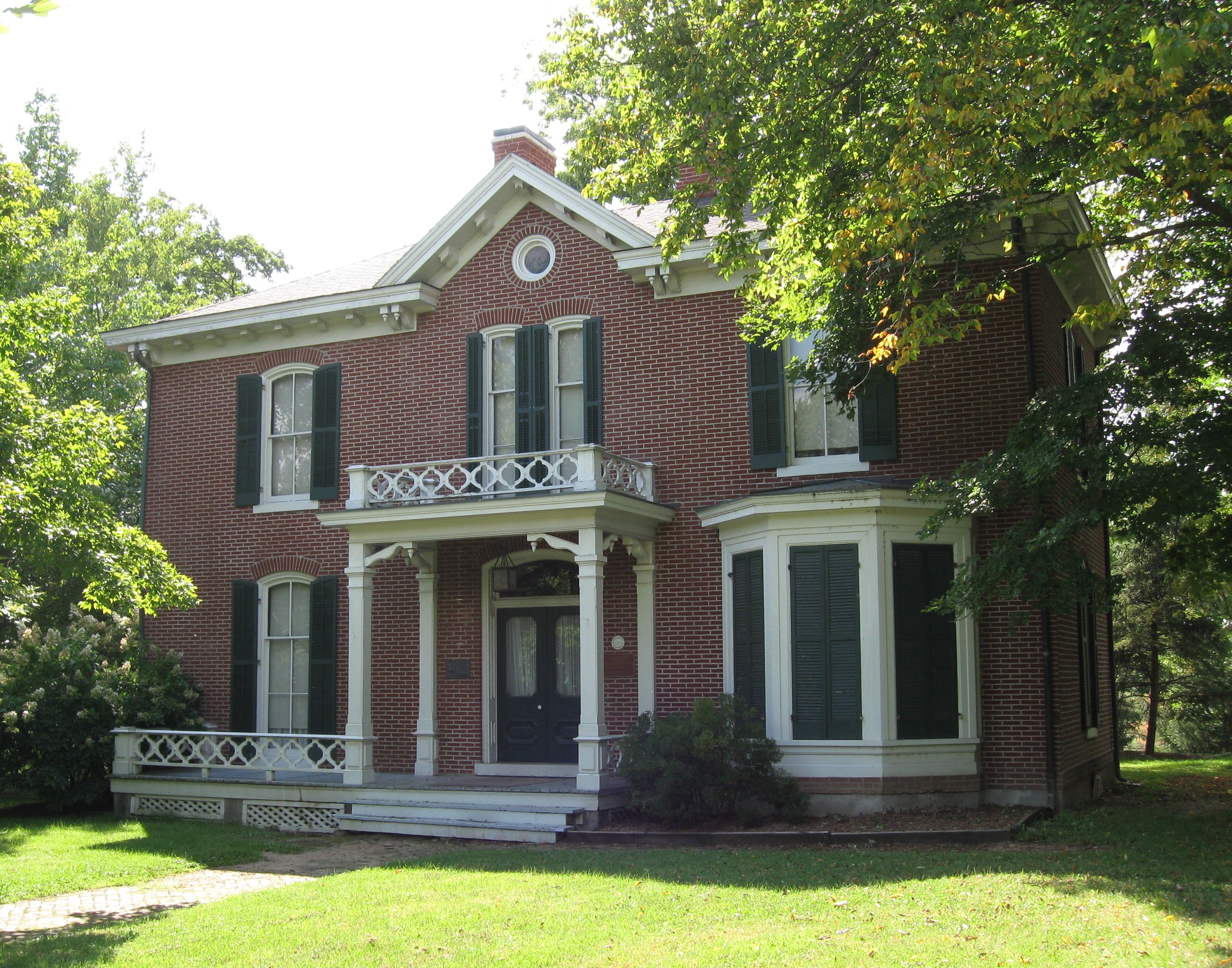
The Maplewood House in Columbia, Missouri.

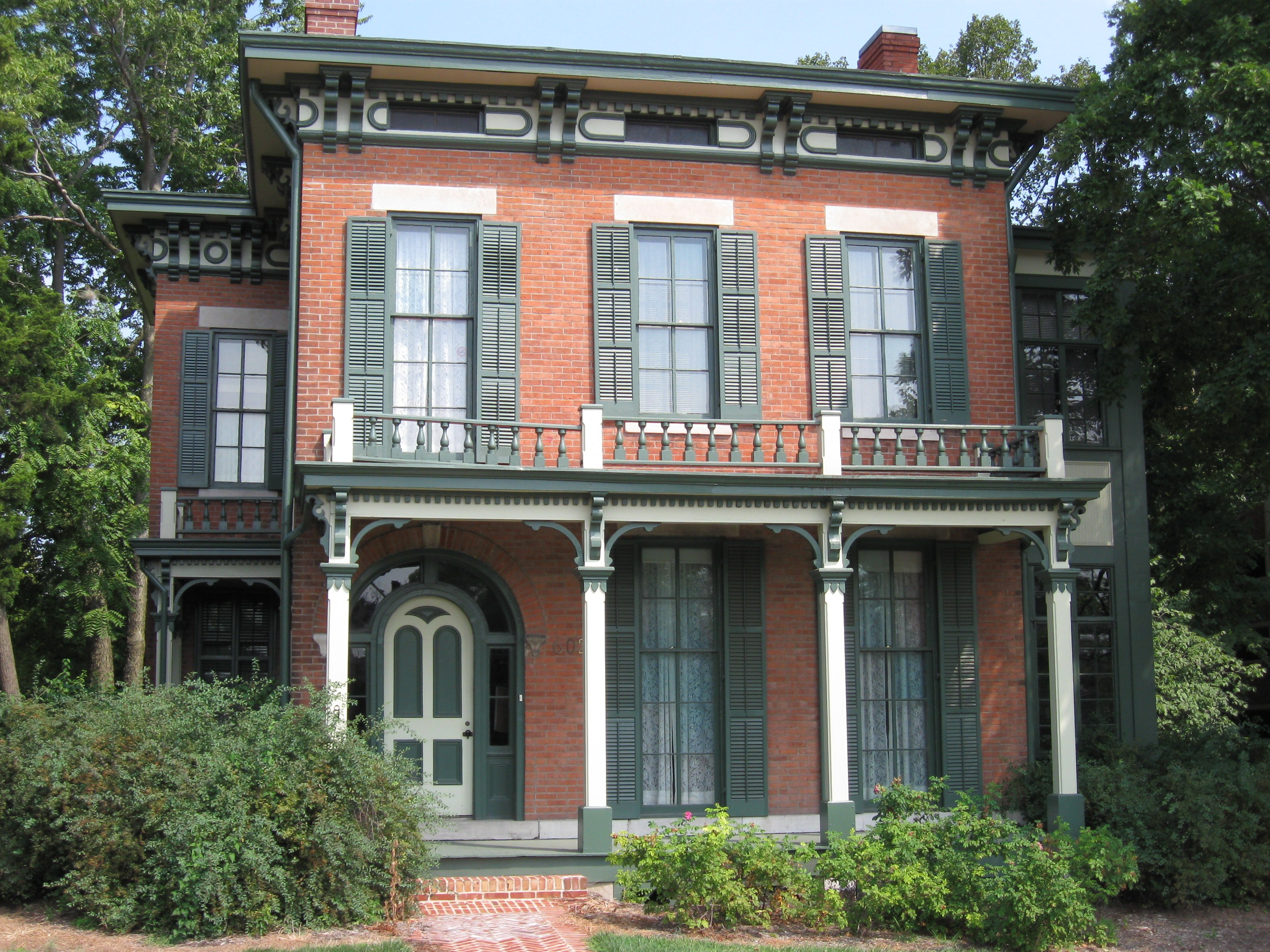
The Sanford F Conley House on the campus of the University of Missouri - Columbia

== See also ==
- List of Registered Historic Places in Missouri
