= Sanford F. Conley House =

Historic house in Missouri, United States

- U.S. National Register of Historic Places
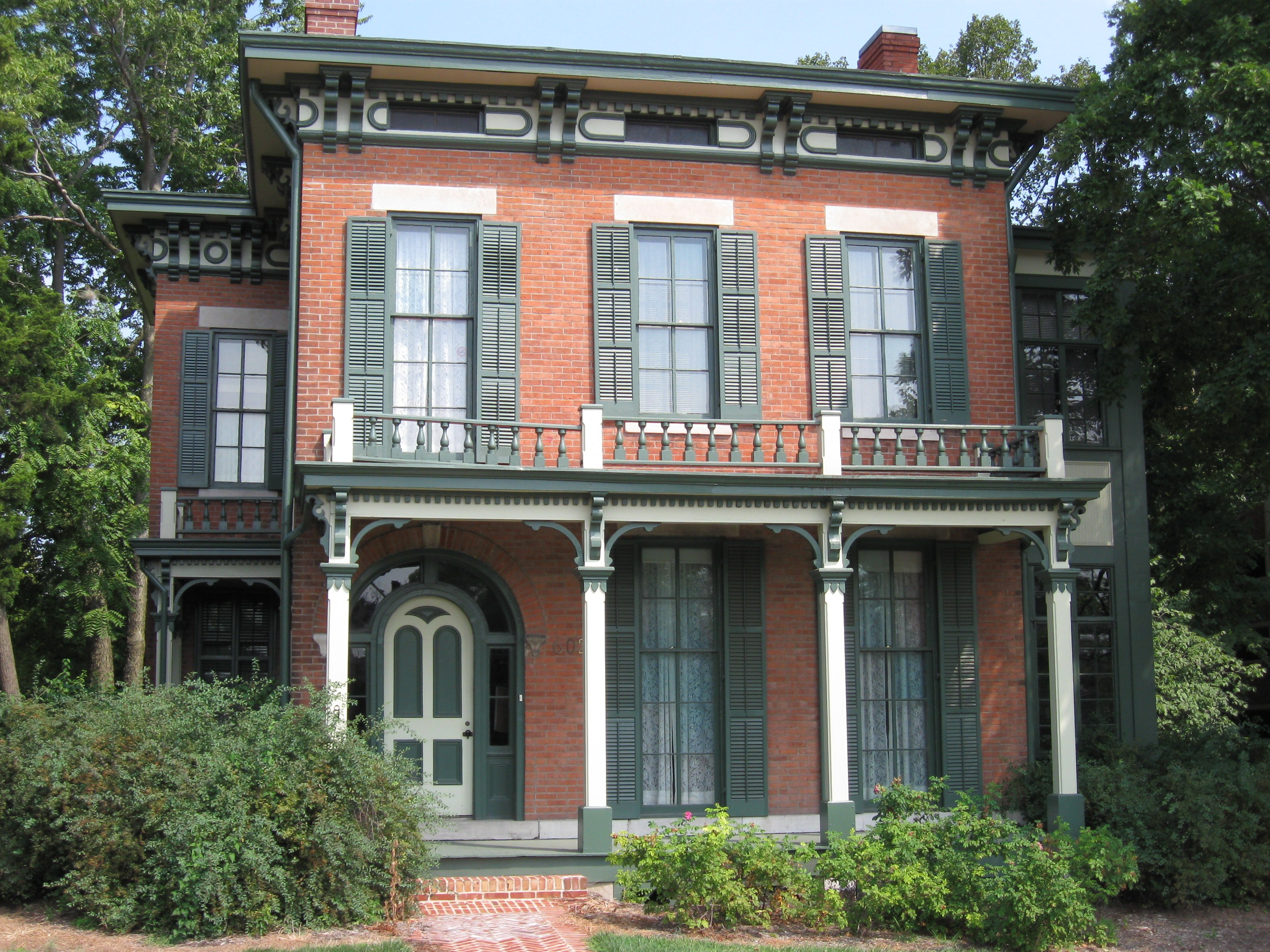

- Location within Missouri Location within the United States
- Location: 602 Sanford Pl., Columbia, Missouri
- Coordinates: 38°56′39″N 92°19′52″W
- Area: 1 acre (0.40 ha)
- Built: 1868
- Architectural style: Italianate
- NRHP reference No.: 73001035
- Added to NRHP: December 18, 1973

The Sanford F. Conley House is a historic home located at Columbia, Missouri. It is an ornate 19th century residence in the Italianate architectural style. Built in 1868 as a residence for his family by the businessman Sanford Francis Conley (1838–1890). The house is near the University of Missouri campus. After being added to the National Register of Historic Places in 1973, the house was purchased by the university and houses the school's "excellence in teaching" program.

== See also ==
- Chatol
