= West Broadway Historic District =

Historic district in Missouri, United States

- U.S. National Register of Historic Places
- U.S. Historic district
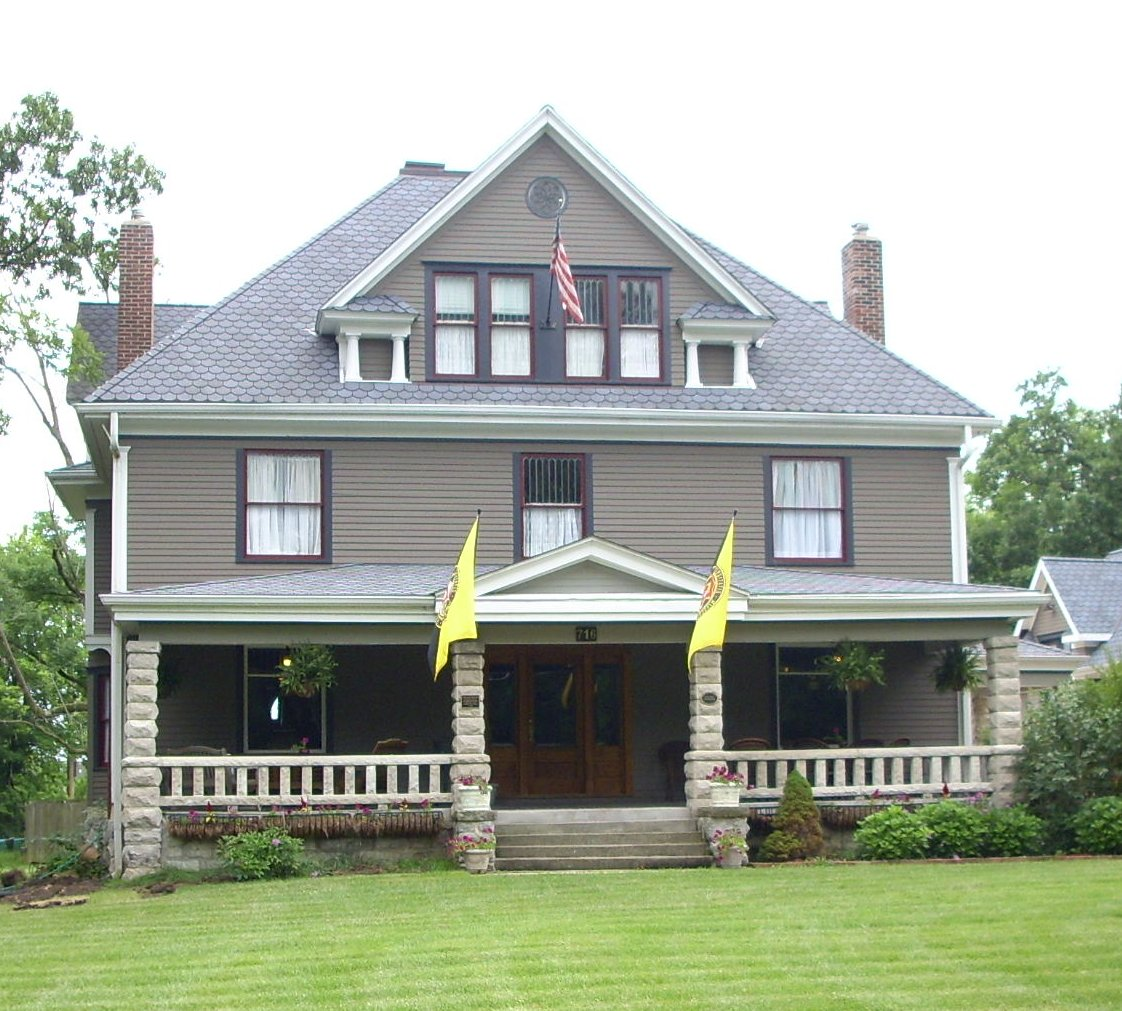
- The Taylor House

- Location within Missouri Location within the United States
- Location: 300-922 W. Broadway (except 800, 808, 812), Columbia, Missouri
- Coordinates: 38°57′6″N 92°20′51″W
- Area: 21 acres (8.5 ha)
- Architect: Abt, Ludwig
- Architectural style: Late Victorian, Late 19th And 20th Century Revivals, 60
- NRHP reference No.: 10000221
- Added to NRHP: April 27, 2010

The West Broadway Historic District in Columbia, Missouri is composed of 21 residential properties located facing Broadway on a plateau west of downtown. The district contains some of the largest and best preserved historic homes in Columbia.

The district was listed on the National Register of Historic Places in 2010 and includes the previously listed John N. and Elizabeth Taylor House.
