= Rocheport =

- U.S. National Register of Historic Places
- U.S. Historic district
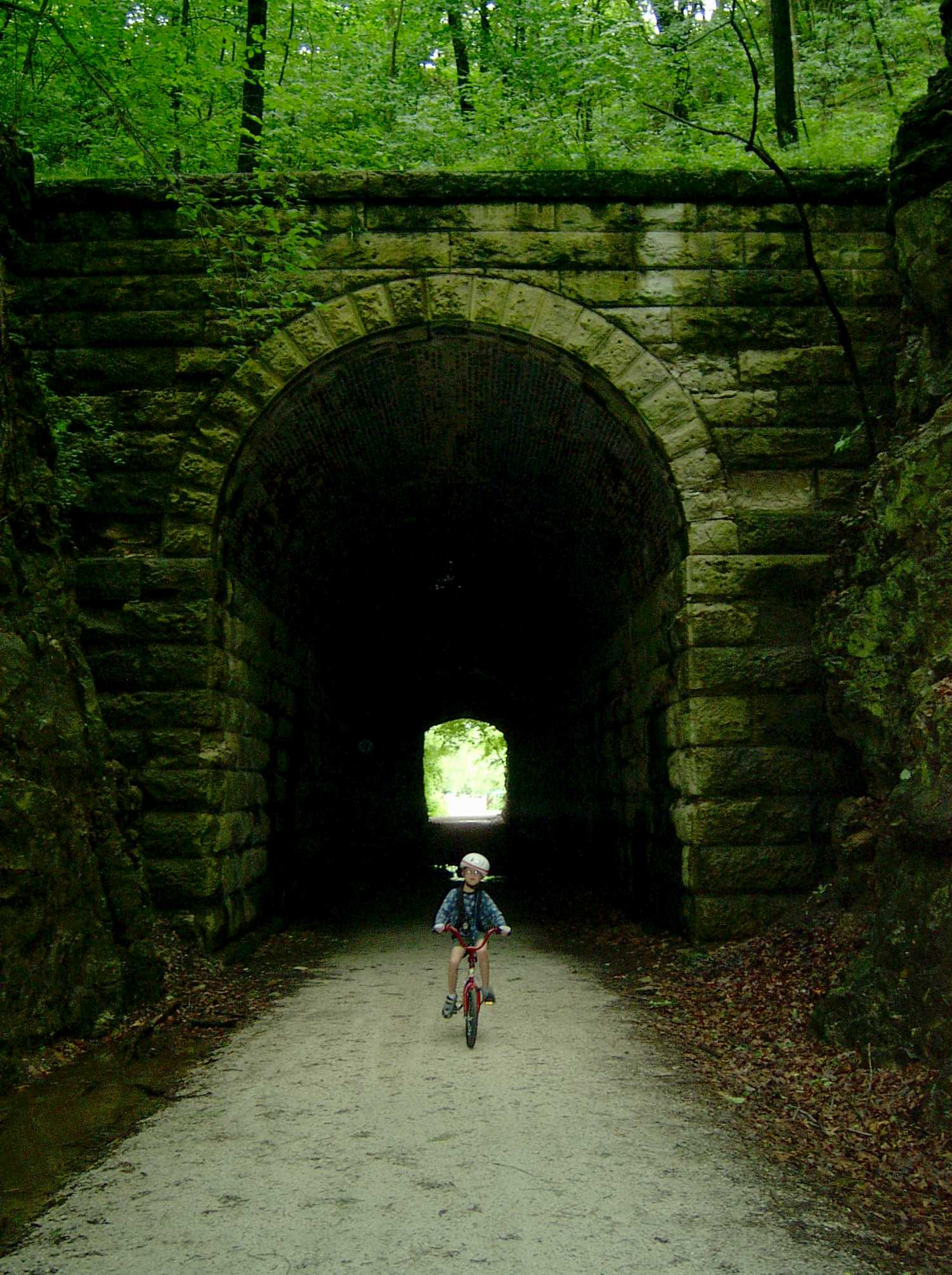
- Boy on Katy Trail, August 2006

- Location within Missouri Location within the United States
- Location: MO 240, Rocheport, Missouri
- Coordinates: 38°58′43″N 92°33′49″W
- Area: 147 acres (59 ha)
- Built: 1830
- Architect: Multiple
- NRHP reference No.: 76001108
- Added to NRHP: October 8, 1976

Rocheport, also known as Rocheport Historic District, is a historic district in Rocheport, Missouri. It dates from 1830.

Rocheport was a trading post for both settlers and Native Americans. After the purchase of the Louisiana Territory in 1803, President Thomas Jefferson commissioned Meriwether Lewis and William Clark to lead an expedition to explore the western territories. On June 7, 1804, their journey led them to the convergence of the Missouri River and Moniteau Creek near the future settlement of Rocheport. Clark noted the features of the land, flora, fauna and native pictographs on the Moniteau Bluffs in his journal. Rocheport became a permanent settlement in the early 19th century.

It was listed on the National Register of Historic Places in 1976.
