= Rocheport, Missouri =

City in Boone County, Missouri, United States

- City
- City of Rocheport
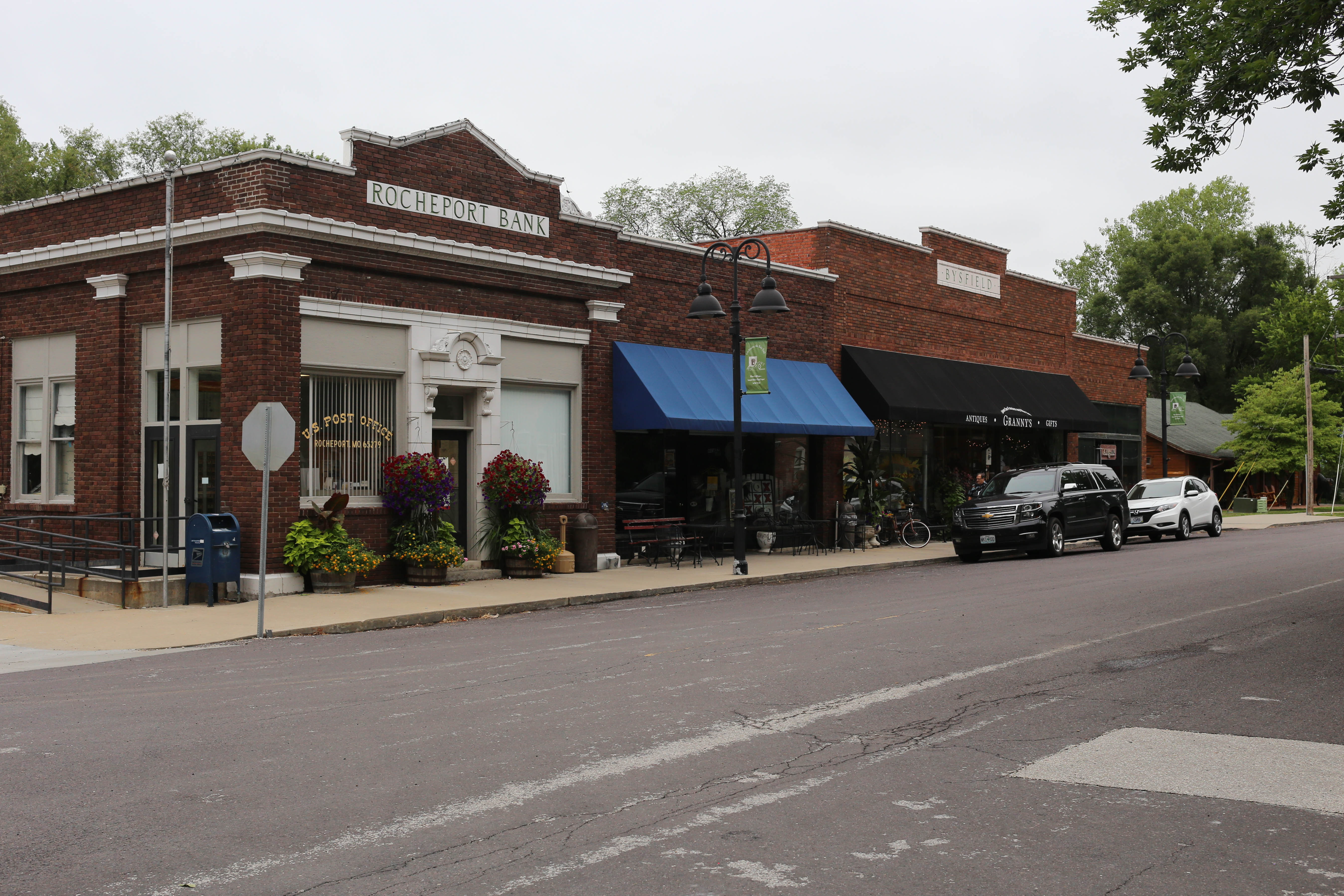
- Rocheport, Missouri in 2018

- Location of Rocheport, Missouri
- Coordinates: 38°58′42″N 92°33′48″W
- Country: United States
- State: Missouri
- County: Boone

Area
  - Total: 0.32 sq mi (0.82 km^{2})
  - Land: 0.32 sq mi (0.82 km^{2})
  - Water: 0 sq mi (0.00 km^{2})
- Elevation: 594 ft (181 m)

Population (2020)
  - Total: 201
  - Density: 634.4/sq mi (244.93/km^{2})
- Time zone: UTC-6 (Central (CST))
  - Summer (DST): UTC-5 (CDT)
- ZIP code: 65279
- Area code: 573
- FIPS code: 29-62498
- GNIS feature ID: 2396393
- Website: rocheport.com

Rocheport (/ˈroʊʃpɔːrt/ ROHSH-port) is a city in Boone County, Missouri, United States. It is part of the Columbia, Missouri Metropolitan Statistical Area. The population was 201 at the 2020 census. Rocheport includes the Rocheport Historic District, an area with buildings dating from 1830 and which is listed on the National Register of Historic Places.

== History ==
Rocheport was a trading post for both settlers and Native Americans. After the purchase of the Louisiana Territory in 1803, President Thomas Jefferson commissioned Meriwether Lewis and William Clark to lead an expedition to explore the western territories. On June 7, 1804, their journey led them to the convergence of the Missouri River and Moniteau Creek near the future settlement of Rocheport. Clark noted the features of the land, flora, fauna and native pictographs on the bluffs in his journal. The Sauk leader Quashquame led a village of Sauk, Meskwaki, and Ioway near Rocheport, along Moniteau Creek in the first decade of the 19th century; this village was noted by Zebulon Pike in 1806. Rocheport became a permanent settlement in the early nineteenth century. Rocheport is a French name meaning "rocky port".

The Moses U. Payne House is a historic structured located just outside Rocheport.

== Geography ==
According to the United States Census Bureau, the city has a total area of 0.27 square miles (0.70 km^{2}), all land.

== Demographics ==
Historical population
Census	Pop.	Note	%±
1860	735		—
1870	823		12.0%
1880	728		−11.5%
1890	631		−13.3%
1900	593		−6.0%
1910	434		−26.8%
1920	458		5.5%
1930	455		−0.7%
1940	396		−13.0%
1950	376		−5.1%
1960	375		−0.3%
1970	307		−18.1%
1980	272		−11.4%
1990	255		−6.2%
2000	208		−18.4%
2010	239		14.9%
2020	201		−15.9%
U.S. Decennial Census

=== 2010 census ===
As of the census of 2010, there were 239 people, 121 households, and 63 families living in the city. The population density was 885.2 inhabitants per square mile (341.8/km^{2}). There were 128 housing units at an average density of 474.1 per square mile (183.1/km^{2}). The racial makeup of the city was 91.2% White, 3.8% African American, 2.1% Native American, 0.8% Asian, and 2.1% from two or more races. Hispanic or Latino of any race were 0.8% of the population.

There were 121 households, of which 19.0% had children under the age of 18 living with them, 36.4% were married couples living together, 10.7% had a female householder with no husband present, 5.0% had a male householder with no wife present, and 47.9% were non-families. 39.7% of all households were made up of individuals, and 17.4% had someone living alone who was 65 years of age or older. The average household size was 1.97 and the average family size was 2.60.

The median age in the city was 49.3 years. 16.7% of residents were under the age of 18; 4.6% were between the ages of 18 and 24; 23% were from 25 to 44; 34.7% were from 45 to 64; and 20.9% were 65 years of age or older. The gender makeup of the city was 50.2% male and 49.8% female.

=== 2000 census ===
As of the census of 2000, there were 208 people, 101 households, and 55 families living in the city. The population density was 774.7 inhabitants per square mile (299.1/km^{2}). There were 122 housing units at an average density of 454.4 per square mile (175.4/km^{2}). The racial makeup of the city was 88.94% White, 3.37% African American, 1.44% Native American, 1.44% Asian, 0.48% from other races, and 4.33% from two or more races.

There were 101 households, out of which 20.8% had children under the age of 18 living with them, 45.5% were married couples living together, 5.9% had a female householder with no husband present, and 44.6% were non-families. 37.6% of all households were made up of individuals, and 17.8% had someone living alone who was 65 years of age or older. The average household size was 2.06 and the average family size was 2.73.

In the city the population was spread out, with 17.8% under the age of 18, 5.3% from 18 to 24, 28.4% from 25 to 44, 27.4% from 45 to 64, and 21.2% who were 65 years of age or older. The median age was 44 years. For every 100 females, there were 80.9 males. For every 100 females age 18 and over, there were 72.7 males.

The median income for a household in the city was $32,188, and the median income for a family was $45,156. Males had a median income of $30,625 versus $20,313 for females. The per capita income for the city was $21,483. About 3.5% of families and 4.9% of the population were below the poverty line, including none of those under the age of eighteen and 7.0% of those 65 or over.

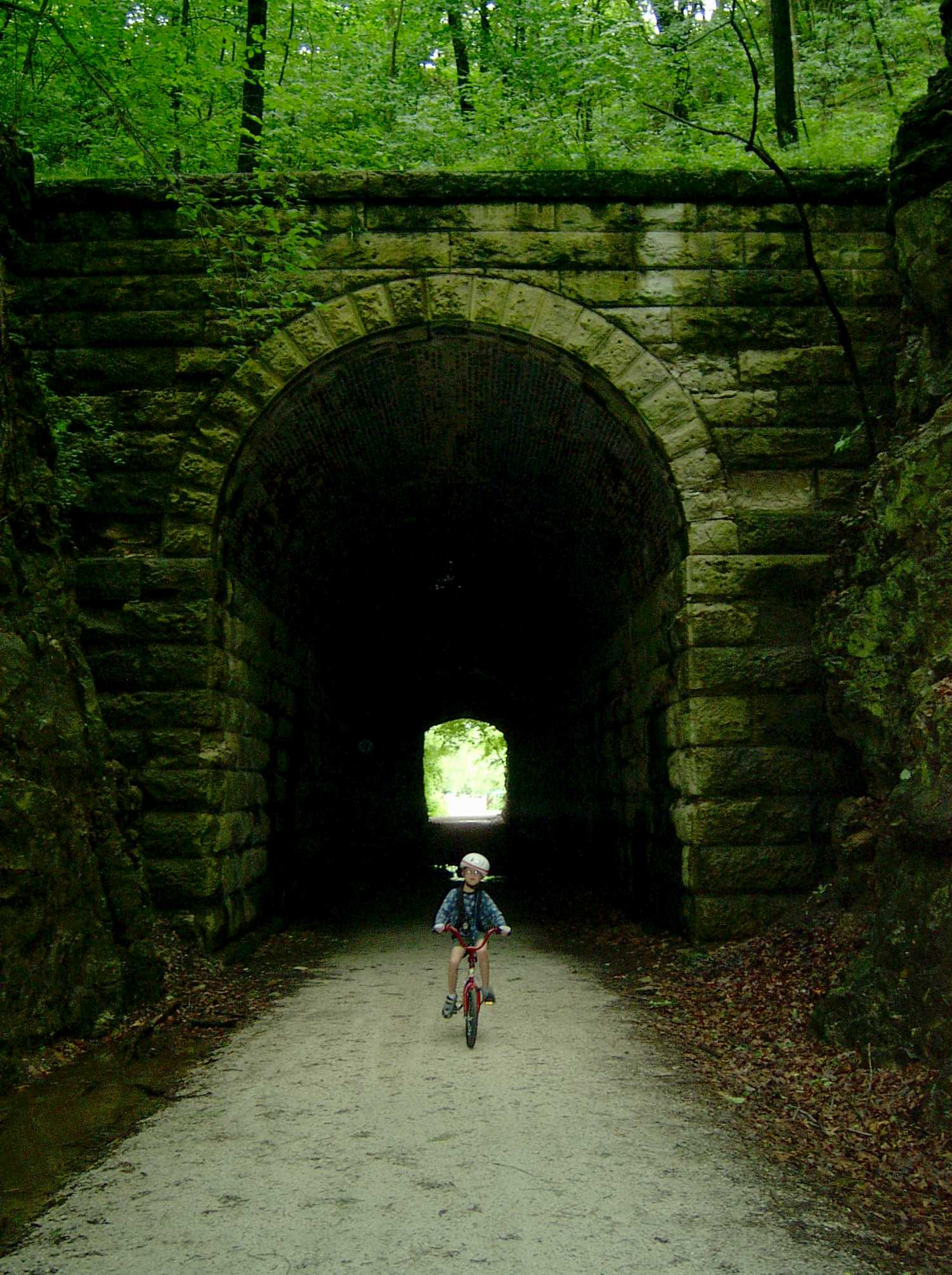
Katy Trail at Rocheport, Missouri

== Recreation ==
Rocheport offers a variety of shops, art galleries, restaurants and outdoor activities. Rocheport is near the middle of the Katy Trail, a 225-mile-long bike path stretching across the state of Missouri, that was built on a former railroad right-of-way.

== Education ==
It is in the New Franklin R-I School District.

== Notable people ==
- David W. Alexander, 19th century Los Angeles, California, politician and sheriff

== See also ==
- List of cities in Missouri
