= Moses U. Payne House =

Historic house in Missouri, United States

- U.S. National Register of Historic Places
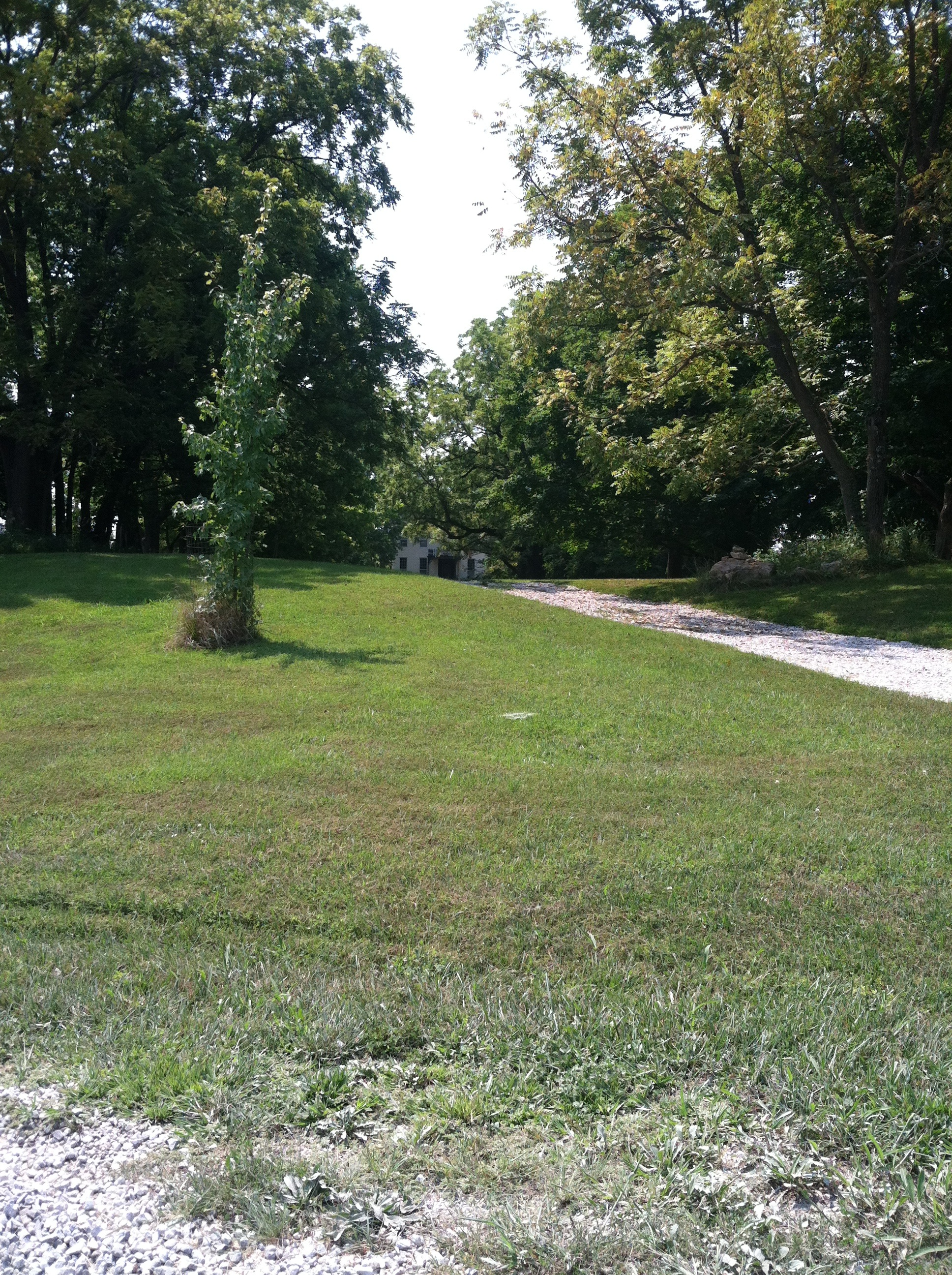
- The driveway and distant house viewed from Roby Farm Road

- Location within Missouri Location within the United States
- Nearest city: Rocheport, Missouri
- Coordinates: 38°57′45″N 92°31′53″W
- Area: 3.8 acres (1.5 ha)
- Built: 1856-1857
- Architectural style: I-house
- NRHP reference No.: 94001204
- Added to NRHP: October 07, 1994

The Moses U. Payne House, also known as Lynn Bluffs and Roby River Bed and Breakfast, is a historic home near the Missouri River in Rocheport, Missouri. It was constructed in 1856–1857, and is a large frame central hall plan I-house. It is five bays wide and features an ornamental ironwork front porch.

It was added to the National Register of Historic Places in 1994.

== See also ==
- Historic houses in Missouri
