= KMFC =

Radio station in Missouri, US

- Centralia, Missouri; United States
- Broadcast area: Columbia, Missouri
- Frequency: 92.1 MHz
- Branding: K-LOVE

Programming
- Format: Contemporary Christian
- Affiliations: K-LOVE

Ownership
- Owner: Educational Media Foundation

History
- First air date: 1984-03-16 (as KZOU)
- Former call signs: KZOU (1984–1985)

Technical information
- Licensing authority: FCC
- Facility ID: 65547
- Class: C3
- ERP: 16,000 watts
- HAAT: 122.0 meters
- Transmitter coordinates: 39°9′58.00″N 92°9′52.00″W
- Translators: K293CI 106.5 MHz Columbia, MO

Links
- Public license information: Public file; LMS

KMFC (92.1 FM) is a radio station broadcasting a Contemporary Christian format. It is licensed to Centralia, Missouri, United States, and serves the Columbia, Missouri area. The station is owned by the Educational Media Foundation.

The station extends coverage to Columbia through translator K293CI (106.5 FM).

== History ==
Before being K-Love, KMFC was locally owned by the Clair Group, and featured a mix of contemporary Christian music, Christian talk, and paid religious programming. KMFC's original studios were located at 1249 E. Highway 22 in Centralia.
