= Chatol =

Historic house in Missouri, United States

- U.S. National Register of Historic Places
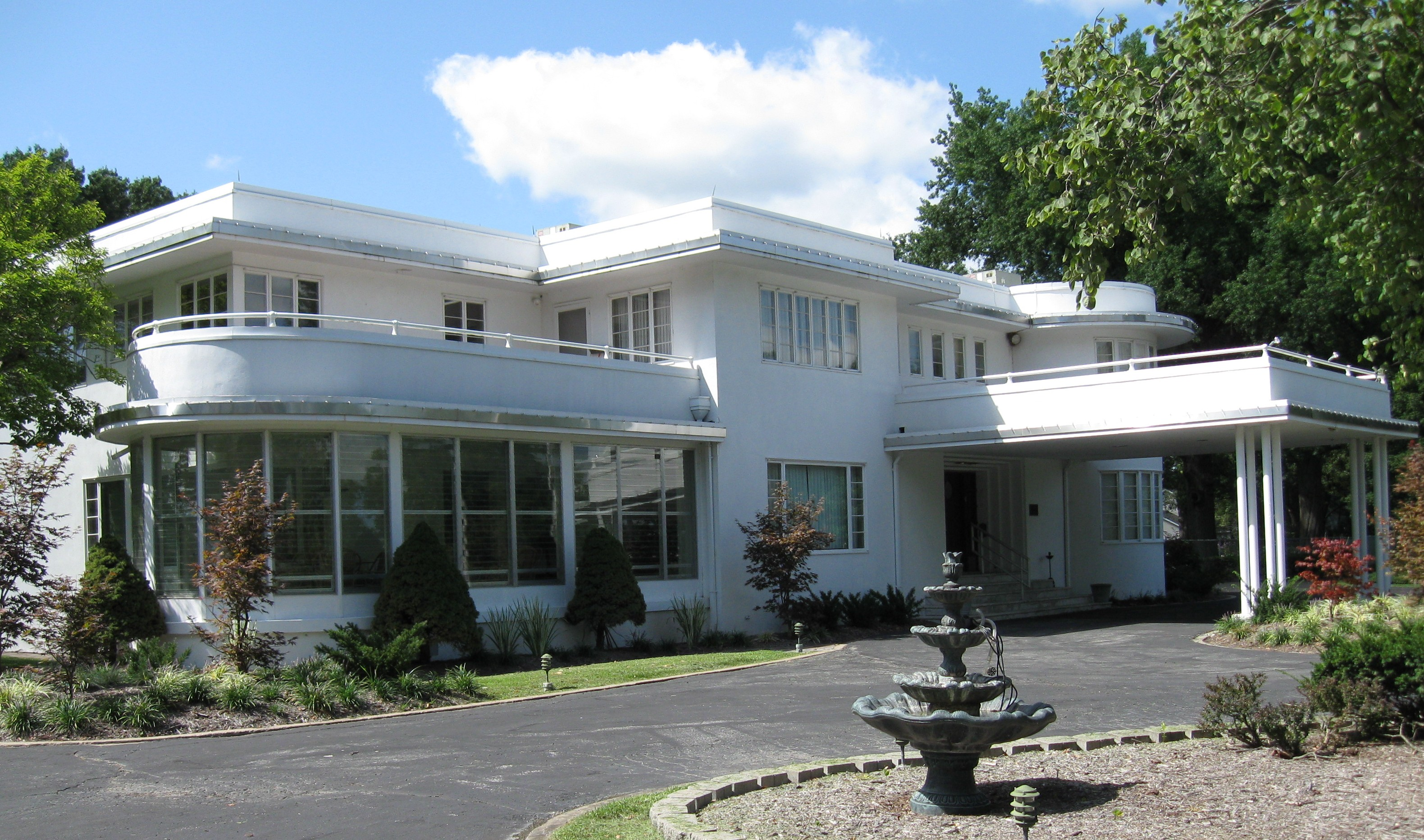

- Location within Missouri Location within the United States
- Location: 543 S. Jefferson St., Centralia, Missouri
- Coordinates: 39°12′17″N 92°8′6″W
- Area: 4.1 acres (1.7 ha)
- Built: 1940
- Architect: Bihr, Sam
- Architectural style: Moderne, International Style
- NRHP reference No.: 79001346
- Added to NRHP: April 20, 1979

The Chatol House & Gardens also known as The Chatol, The White House or The Chance Guest House is a National Register historic mansion that has been restored to host memorable weddings and events. Located in Centralia, Missouri, the home was built in 1940, as the private residence of F. Gano & Annie Chance. The home is reflective of Streamline Moderne and International Style architecture. The home measures approximately 136 feet by 92 feet with over 10,000 square feet of living space, including a large vaulted ballroom and furnishings from the 1933-34 World's Fair. It was constructed with steel footings on a concrete foundation, with a spring system employed in the walls. The striking all white home includes many characteristics of Streamline Moderne/International Style architecture, including curved walls, port hole windows, horizontal ships banding and stair step elements throughout. Today the home remains in the Chance family and is owned by Gil & Tam Stone. F. Gano Chance was the son of Albert Bishop Chance, inventor of the earth anchor, whose home and gardens are also on the National Register.

It was listed on the National Register of Historic Places in 1979.
