= Sunnydale Adventist Academy =

Location
- Centralia, Missouri; USA; 39°14′39″N 92°12′49″W

Information
- Type: Private, day & boarding
- Established: 1946
- Principal: Randy Ferguson
- Faculty: 22
- Grades: 9-12
- Gender: Co-educational
- Enrollment: 170+
- Colors: Maroon and white
- Athletics: Basketball (men and women), Soccer (co-ed), Volleyball (women), Gymnastics
- Mascot: Spartans
- Website: www.sunnydale.org

Sunnydale Adventist Academy (SAA) is a co-educational parochial boarding secondary school operated by the Iowa-Missouri Conference of the Seventh-day Adventist Church. It is a part of the Seventh-day Adventist education system, the world's second largest Christian school system The school opened to students in 1946. Sunnydale provides a comprehensive educational program that includes spiritual, academic, and social development. Formerly known as Sunnydale Academy (SA). It is located northeast of Centralia, Missouri in Audrain County, Missouri.

== History ==
=== Beginnings ===
On August 14, 1944, the Missouri Conference constituency appointed an Educational Commission empowered to locate and establish an academy for the Missouri Conference. This commission consisted of the local conference committee and one member from each of the nine districts within the state of Missouri. At their November 4, 1945 meeting, the Commission voted to purchase the 740 acres (3.0 km^{2}) A. B. Chance farm five miles west of Centralia, Missouri for half its valuation, including machinery, cattle, and dairy. The land was purchased with the understanding that the union and the General Conference approve the location. The Central Union Conference contributed $40,000 to the project. The General Conference contributed $30,000. The farm was described as a "very fine farm, fully equipped and ready to begin work on..."

A board had been chosen. It planned first to build a girls dorm. H. C. Hartman was chosen to be the principal and business manager. His wife took charge of the music department. The board invited C. M. Babcock to be the Bible teacher. Babcock was a minister with "long experience, true and tried..." Herschel Turner, a successful Missouri farmer, agreed to manage the farm which was envisioned as a major industry on campus. Miss Hilda Fern Remley agreed to be the girls dean; Delmer Holbrook to be the boys' dean. Both were from Union College in Lincoln, Nebraska. The board planned for the school to open September, 1946. They planned for funds to be available from the Missouri church members.

The Missouri Conference of Seventh-day Adventists set a fund-raising goal of $60,000, an average of $20 per member. They hoped to raise this amount in the few weeks remaining in 1945. Leaders of the churches were asked to visit every Adventist home in Missouri in an effort to meet the goal. Construction could not begin until 75% of the funds had been raised.

The ground-breaking ceremony for the girls' dorm took place on February 18, 1946. This was the first building to be erected at the academy. After the program, Principal Hartman took the controls of a caterpillar tractor and Missouri Conference President Hutches guided the plow. Farm manager Herschel Turner drove a team of Missouri mules with veteran minister and Bible teacher C. M. Babcock holding another plow. The two teams ploughed some furrows, breaking the ground in preparation for laying the foundation of the new building. By September 30, both red-brick dormitories were complete, and the first school year began with an enrollment of 125. Teachers held classes in the dormitories, and the hayloft of the barn served as an assembly hall.

=== Change ===
The school finished a red brick administration building with space for classrooms and dedicated it to A. B. Chance in 1950. The materials came from the dismantling of government barracks buildings, and students worked much of the construction. An attached Gymnasium was added in 1953. On the campus, the conference added a two-room elementary school in 1972, a cafeteria and kitchen in 1973, and a church in 1975. The newest building is a dual-purpose library and computer lab.

During the early years, the school supplied employment for its students in the on-campus dairy. However, on August 17, 1962, the dairy and farm buildings burned in a fire. The conference chose to not rebuild. Through the seventies, the school supplied student employment via the SS Plastics and the Dakota Bake 'n Serve frozen dough plant. Until December 2014, the school maintained a workplace called Sunnydale-Goss Industries, where students made hospital-grade oxygen tents and wooden-handled brushes.

== See also ==
- List of Seventh-day Adventist secondary schools
- Seventh-day Adventist education
