= William B. Hunt House =

Historic house in Missouri, United States

- U.S. National Register of Historic Places
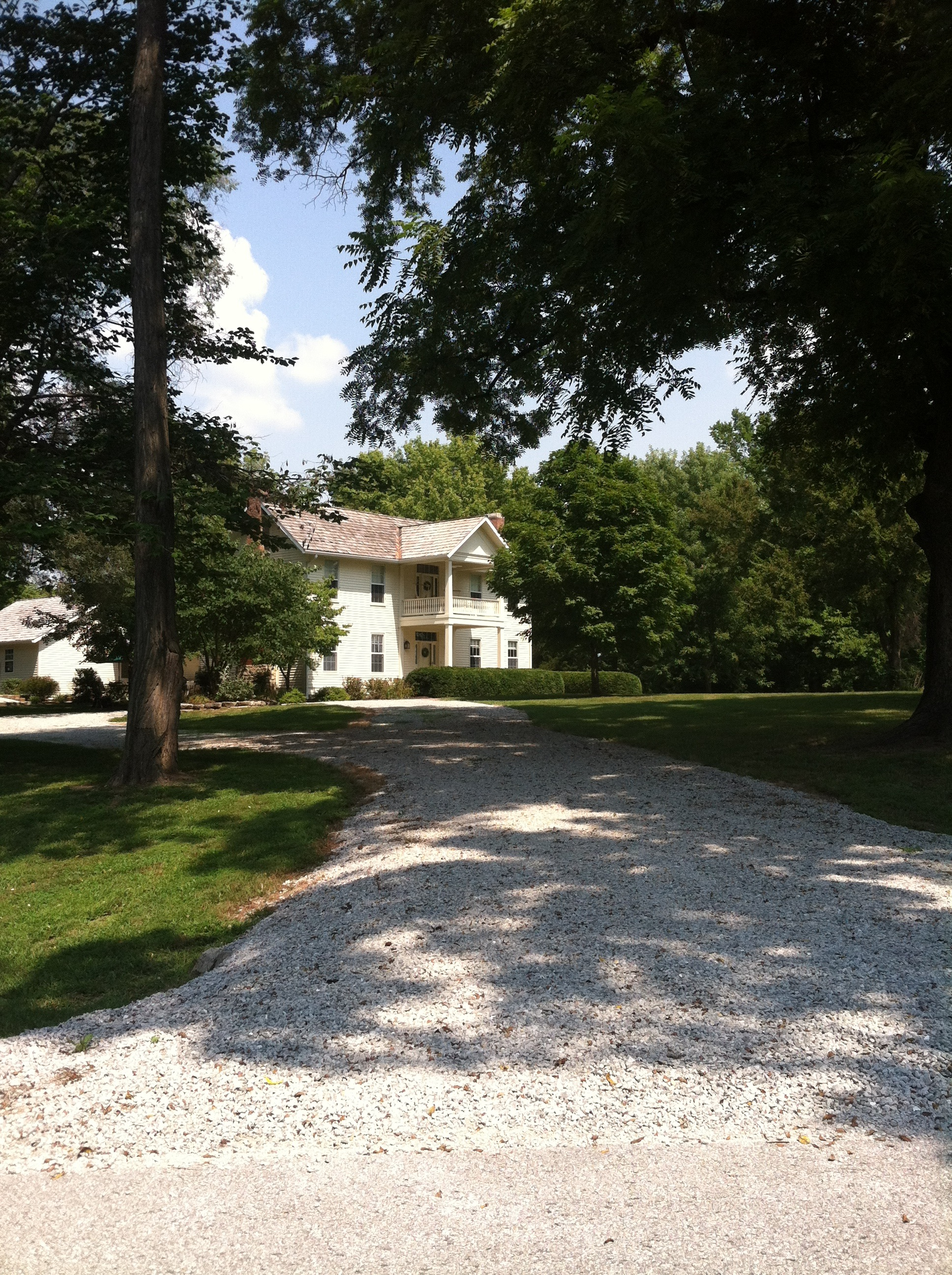
- The house viewed from the driveway

- Location within Missouri Location within the United States
- Location: 8939 W. Terrapin Hills Rd., Columbia, Missouri
- Coordinates: 38°55′9″N 92°28′27″W
- Area: 5.6 acres (2.3 ha)
- Built: 1862
- Architectural style: I-house
- NRHP reference No.: 96001567
- Added to NRHP: January 9, 1997

The William B. Hunt House is a historic home just outside Columbia, Missouri, USA, near the town of Huntsdale and the Missouri River. The house was constructed in 1862, and is a two-story, five-bay, frame I-house. It incorporates a two-room log house which dates to about 1832. It features a central two-story portico.

It was added to the National Register of Historic Places in 1997.

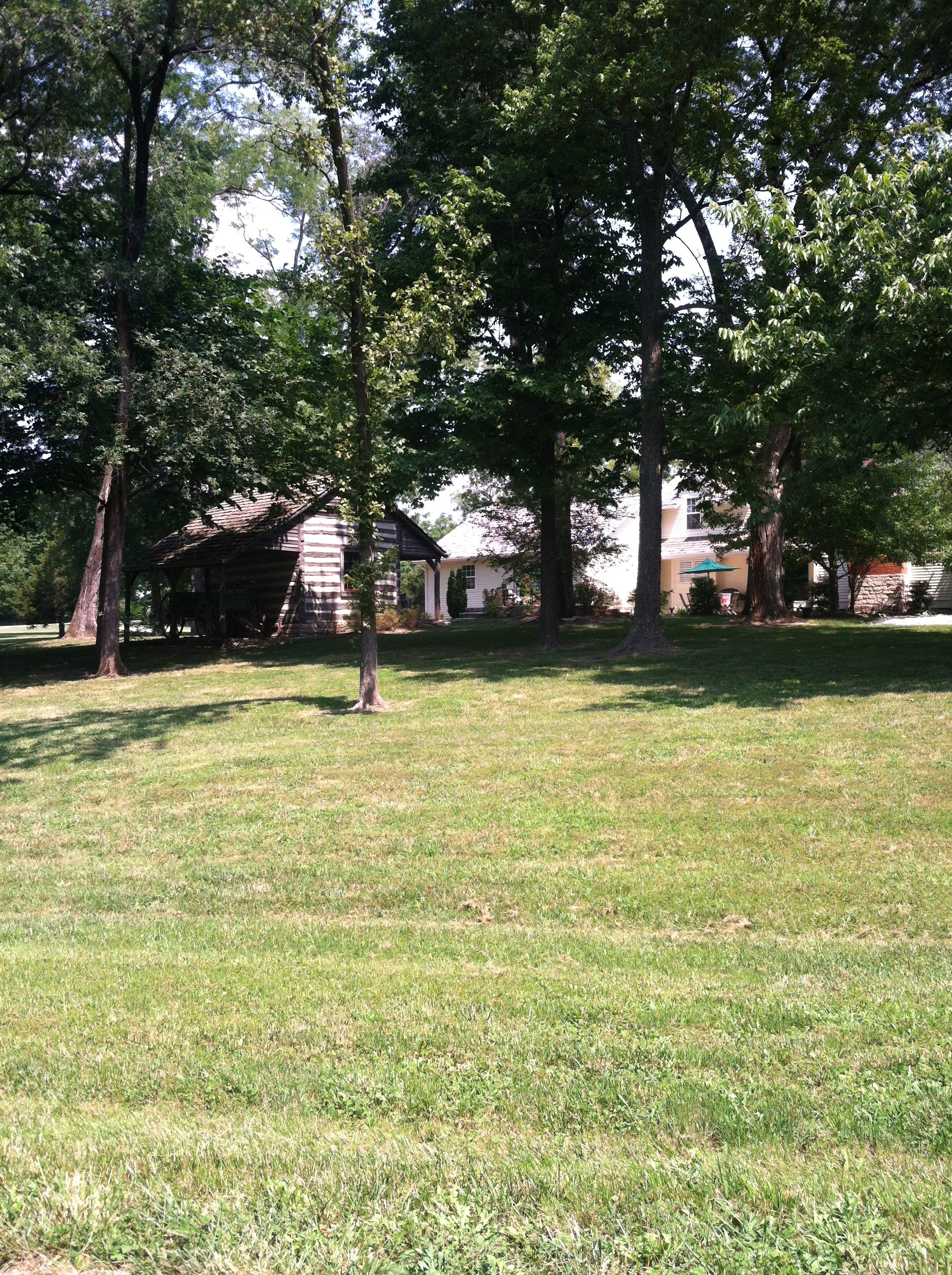
A small log cabin located on the property west of the house

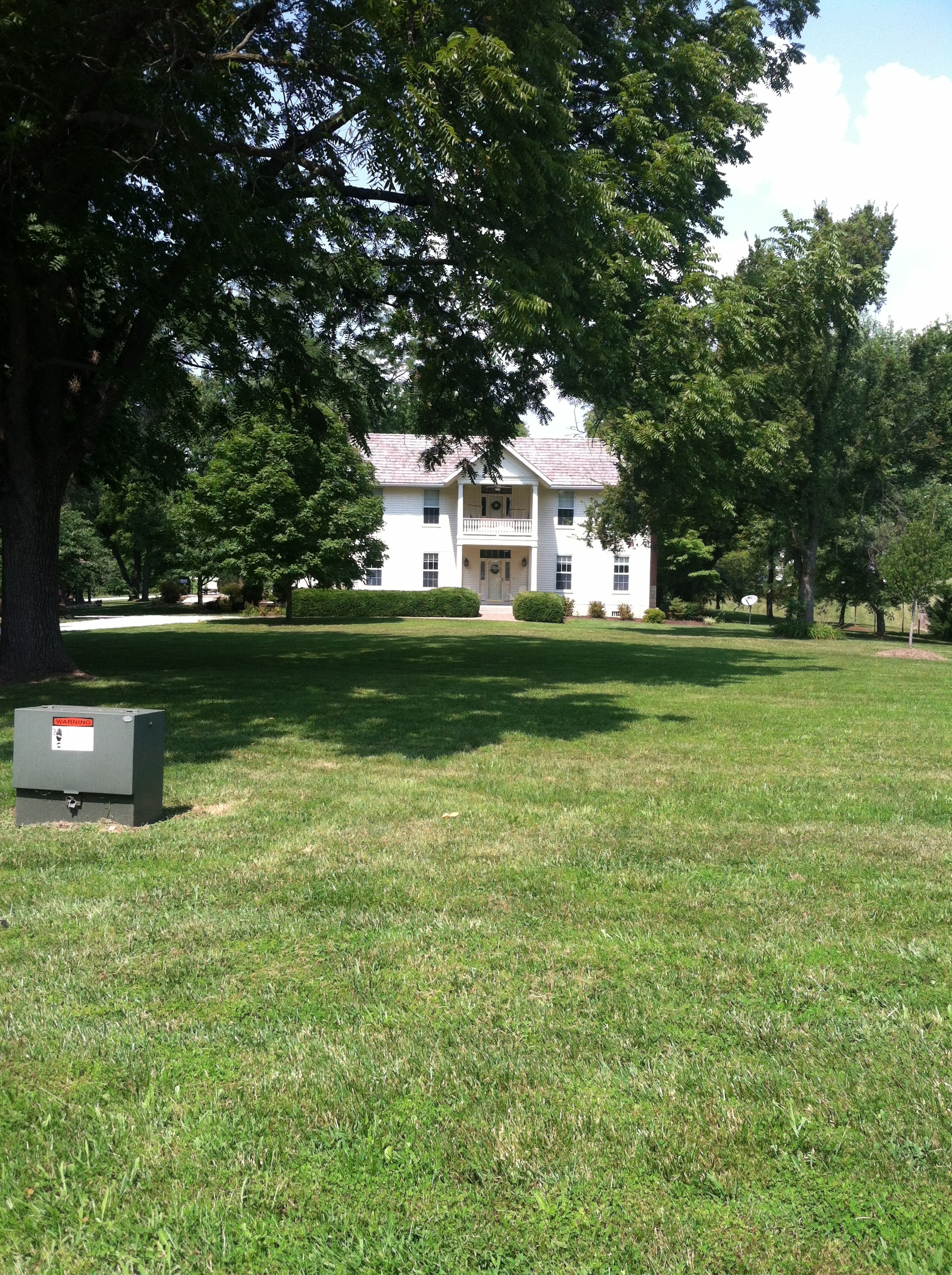
The house viewed from the front (South) side

== See also ==
- Historic houses in Missouri
