= Rice-Tremonti House =

Historic house in Missouri, United States

- U.S. National Register of Historic Places
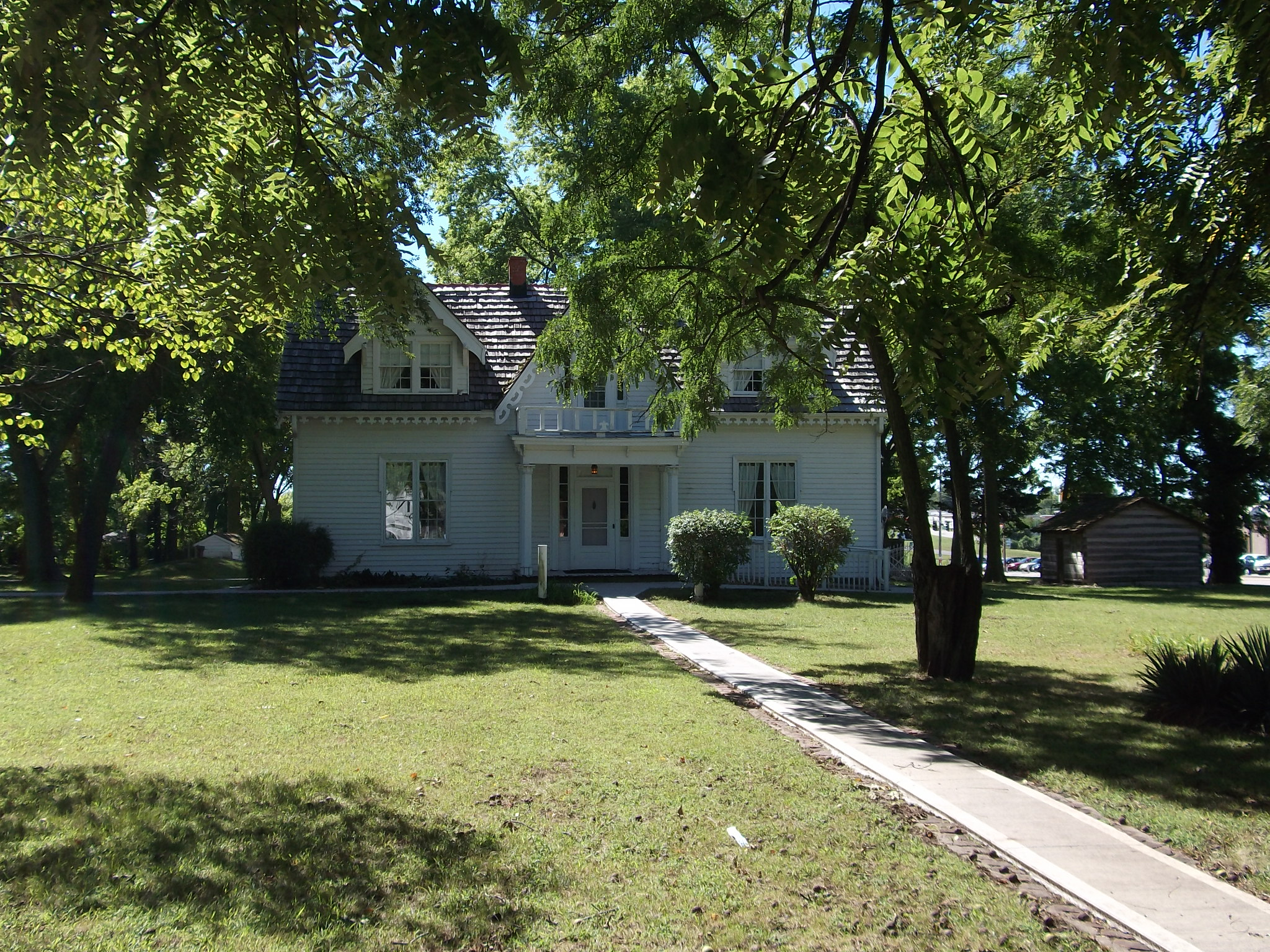

- Location within Missouri Location within the United States
- Location: 8801 E. 66th St., Raytown, Missouri
- Coordinates: 39°0′14″N 94°28′54″W
- Area: 1.4 acres (0.57 ha)
- Built: 1844
- Architectural style: Carpenter Gothic
- NRHP reference No.: 79001376
- Added to NRHP: March 2, 1979

The Rice-Tremonti House in Raytown, Missouri, was built in 1844 and listed on the National Register of Historic Places in 1979.

The house was built by Archibald and Sally Rice, who had moved to Missouri from North Carolina and started a forced-labor farm worked by enslaved people. They built a log house in this location around 1836. The current Gothic Revival frame farmhouse replaced the original 1844. The farm was about eight miles south of Independence along the Santa Fe Trail and became a popular stop for travelers. Archibald died in 1849 and his son Elihu Coffee Rice became the owner. In 1850, Elihu married Catherine "Kitty" Stoner White. Kitty enslaved Sophia White, who accompanied her and lived in a cabin near the home's back door. "Aunt Sophie" remained with the family until shortly before her death in 1896.

Rice and his family, who were slave-holding Southern sympathizers, moved to Texas during the Civil War. For unknown reasons, the house was not destroyed under General Order No. 11. It is believed to be the oldest surviving frame building remaining in Jackson County.

In 1929, the house was bought by Dr. Louis G. Tremonti and his wife Lois Gloria, who sold the house to the Friends of the Rice-Tremonti Home Association in 1988. The association has restored the home and holds open houses for visitors. The site includes several acres of land, the house, and a replica of a slave cabin referred to as "Aunt Sophie's Cabin".
