= Albert Bishop Chance House and Gardens =

Historic house in Missouri, United States

- U.S. National Register of Historic Places
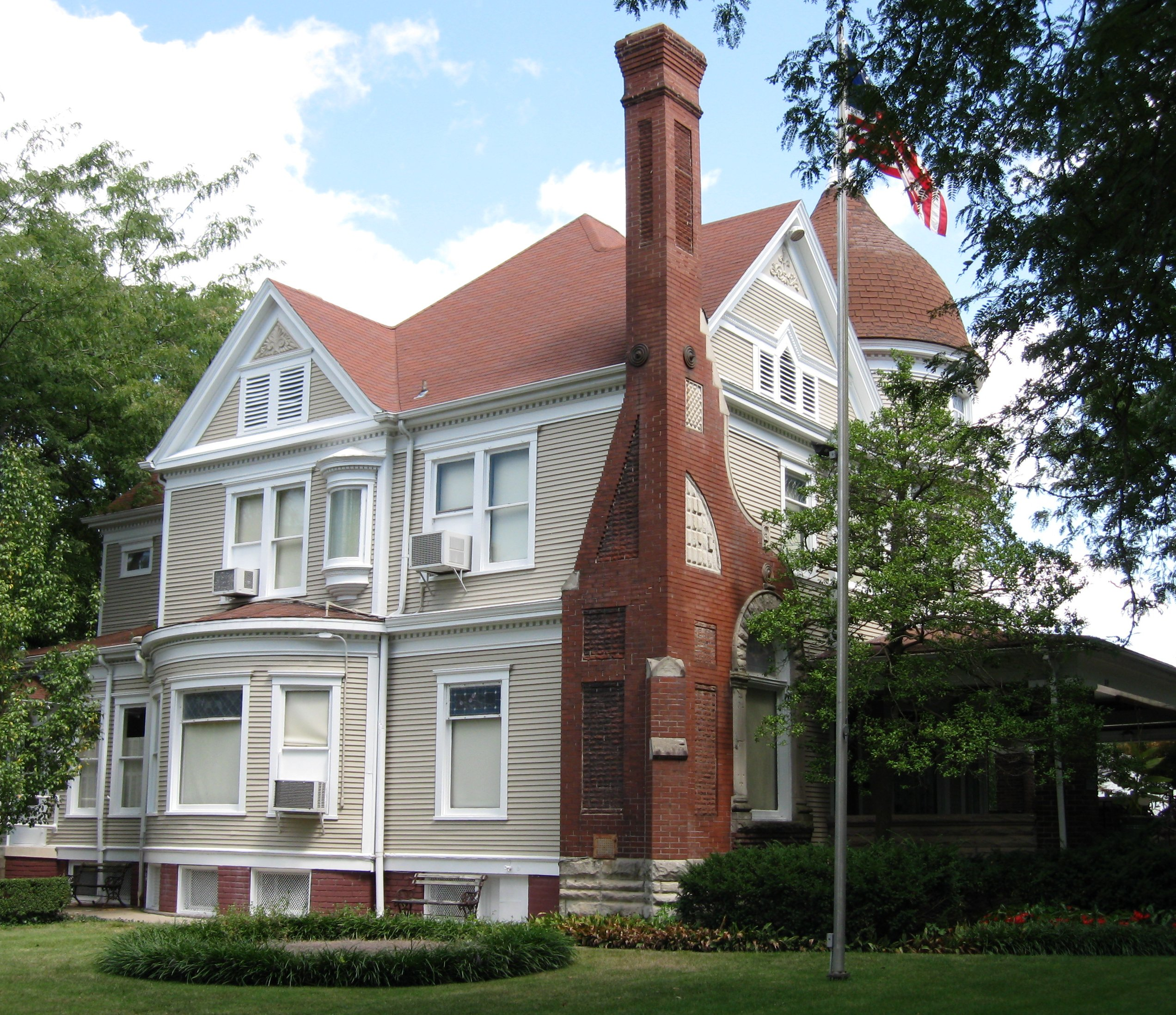

- Location within Missouri Location within the United States
- Location: 319 E. Sneed St., Centralia, Missouri
- Coordinates: 39°12′36″N 92°8′4″W
- Area: less than one acre
- Built: 1904
- Architectural style: Queen Anne
- NRHP reference No.: 79001345
- Added to NRHP: July 3, 1979

The Chance House and Gardens is a historic home and garden located at Centralia, Missouri. The house was built in 1904, and is a two-story, Queen Anne style frame dwelling on a raised brick basement. It features a broad verandah and porte cochere. The formal gardens were added in 1937. The house was purchased by Albert Bishop Chance in 1923. The house is now operated as the Centralia Historical Society Museum. The adjacent Garden is open to the public.

It was listed on the National Register of Historic Places in 1979.

== See also ==
- Chatol – also known as The Chance Guest House in Centralia, Missouri

== Gallery ==
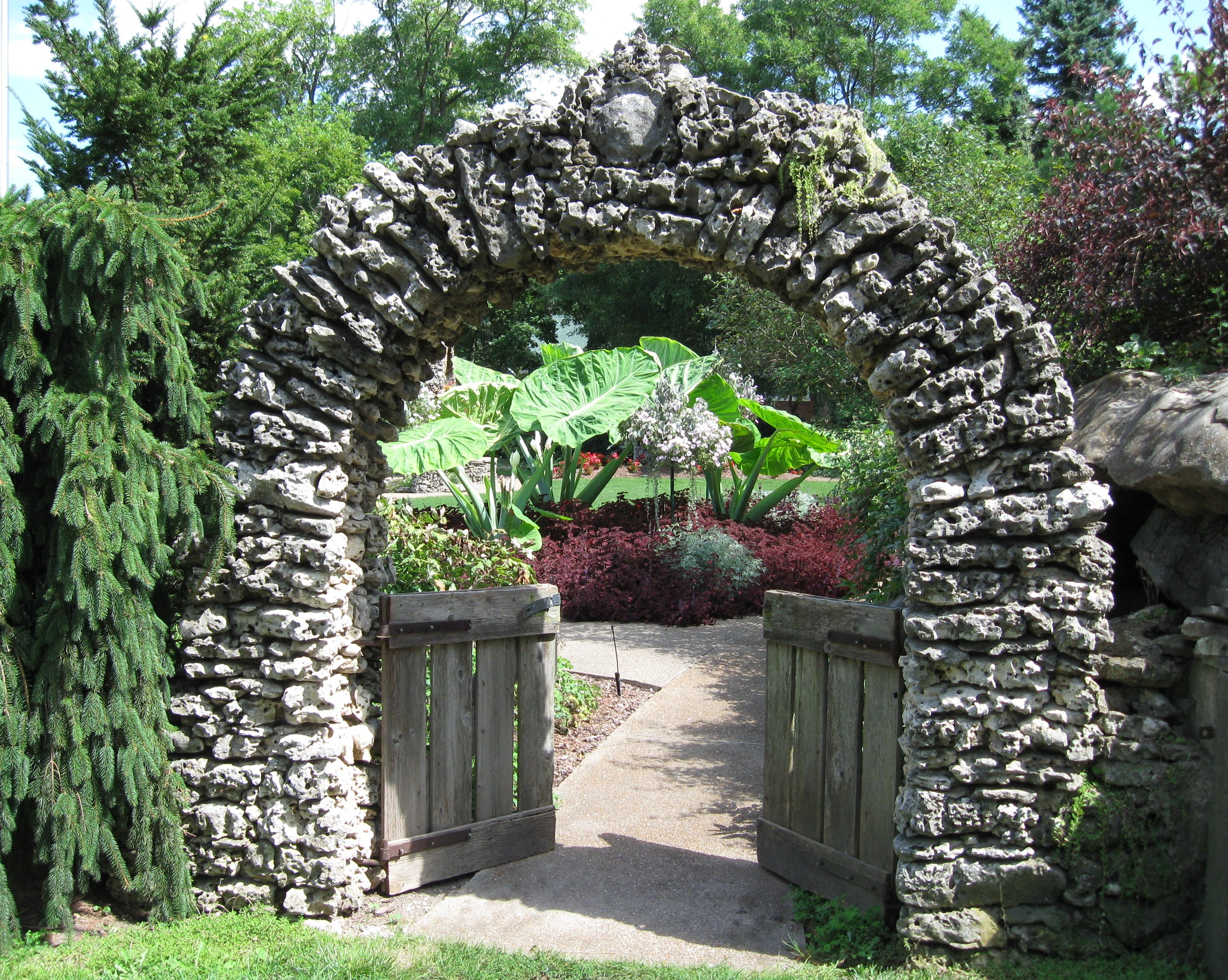
Garden Gate

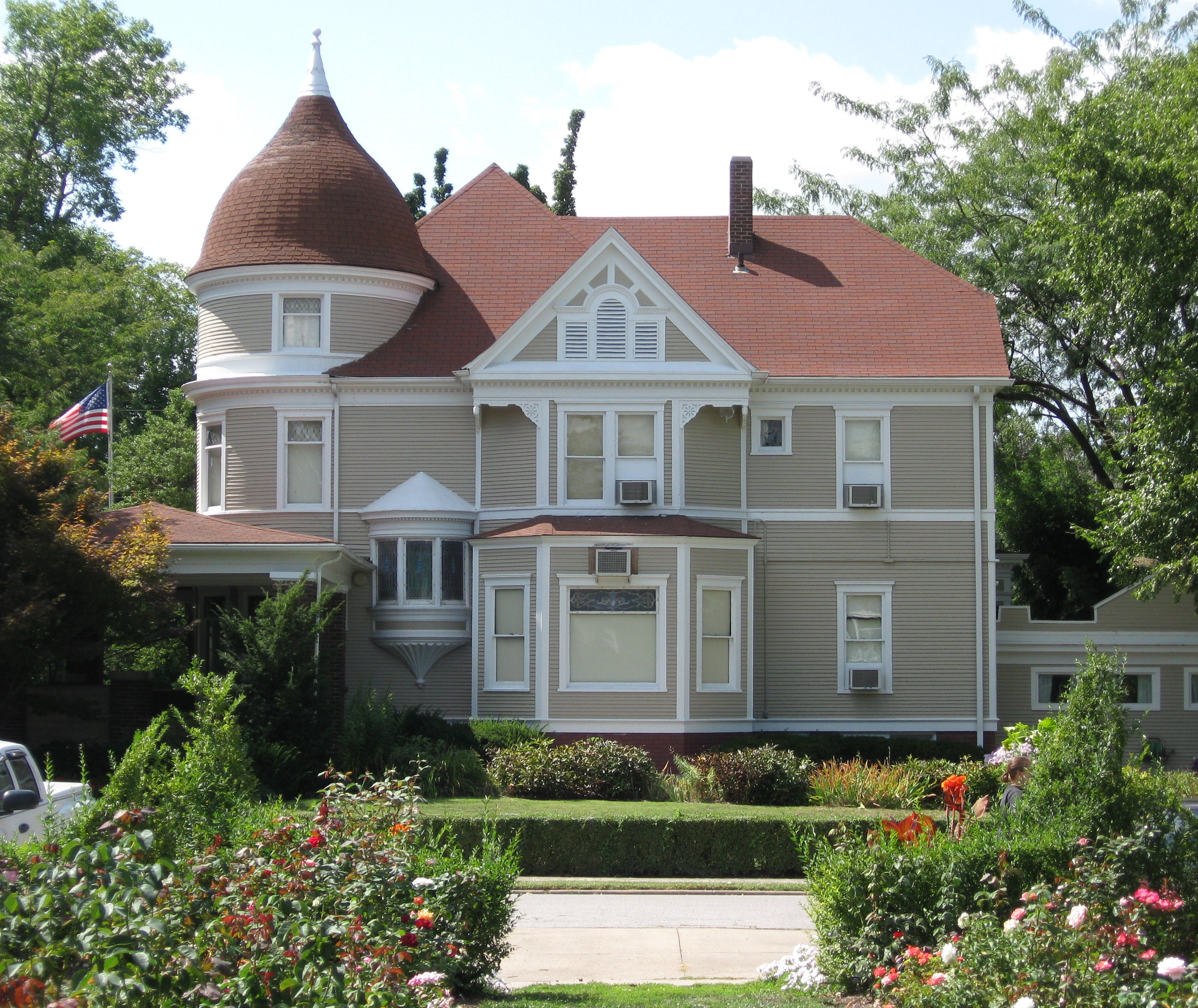
Chance House

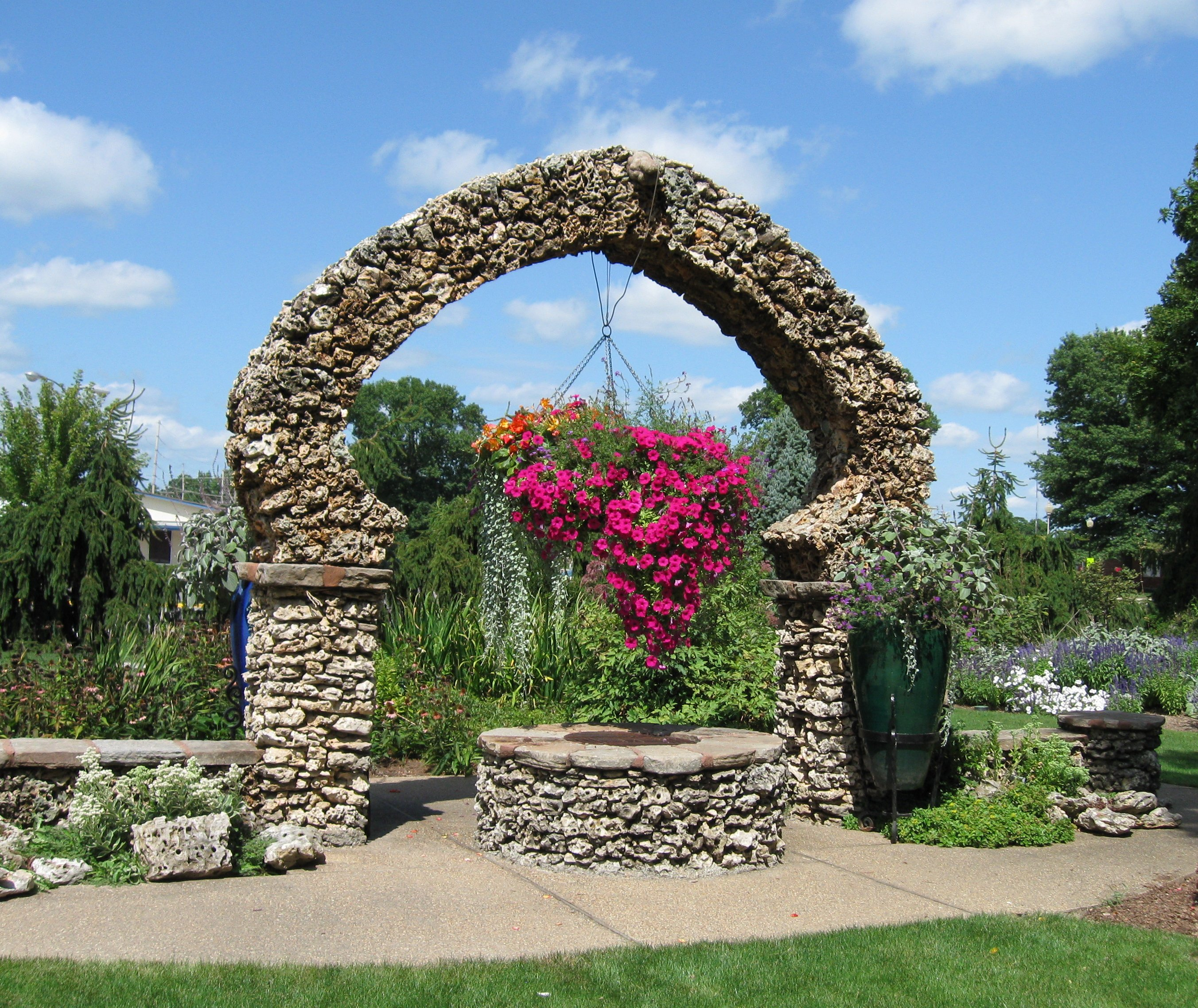
Arch
