= John N. and Elizabeth Taylor House =

Historic house in Missouri, United States

- U.S. National Register of Historic Places
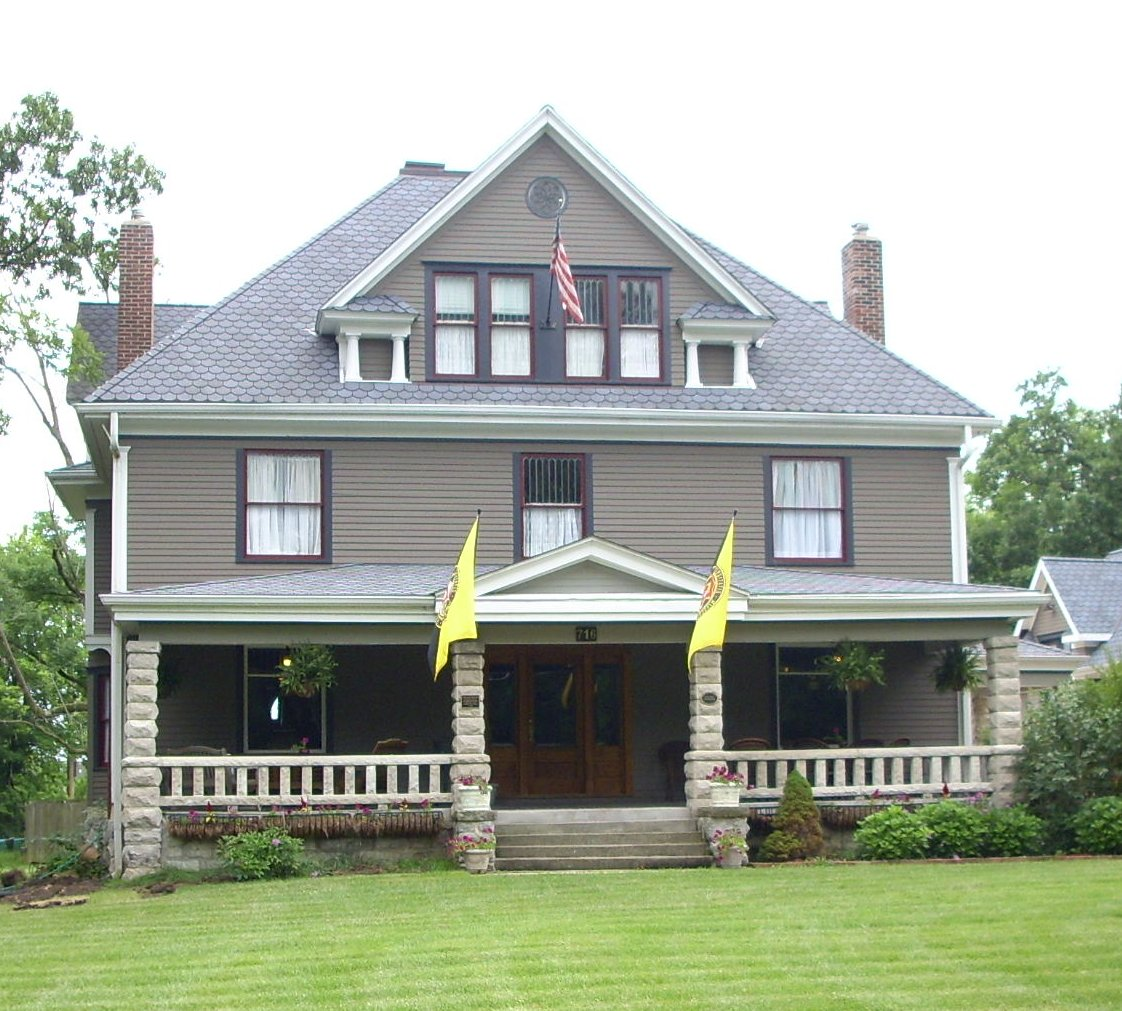

- Location within Missouri Location within the United States
- Location: 716 W Broadway, Columbia, Missouri
- Coordinates: 38°57′4″N 92°20′57″W
- Area: less than one acre
- Built: 1909
- Architectural style: Colonial Revival
- NRHP reference No.: 01000546
- Added to NRHP: May 25, 2001

The John N. and Elizabeth Taylor House (more commonly just Taylor House) is a historic home in Columbia, Missouri which has been restored and once operated as a bed and breakfast. The house was constructed in 1909 and is a 2 1/2-story, Colonial Revival style frame dwelling. It features a wide front porch and side porte cochere. The home was featured on HGTV special called "If walls could talk."

It was placed on the National Register of Historic Places in 2001. In 2010 the house became a contributing property of the newly formed West Broadway Historic District.
