= Centralia, Missouri =

City in Boone and Audrain counties in Missouri, United States

- City
- City of Centralia
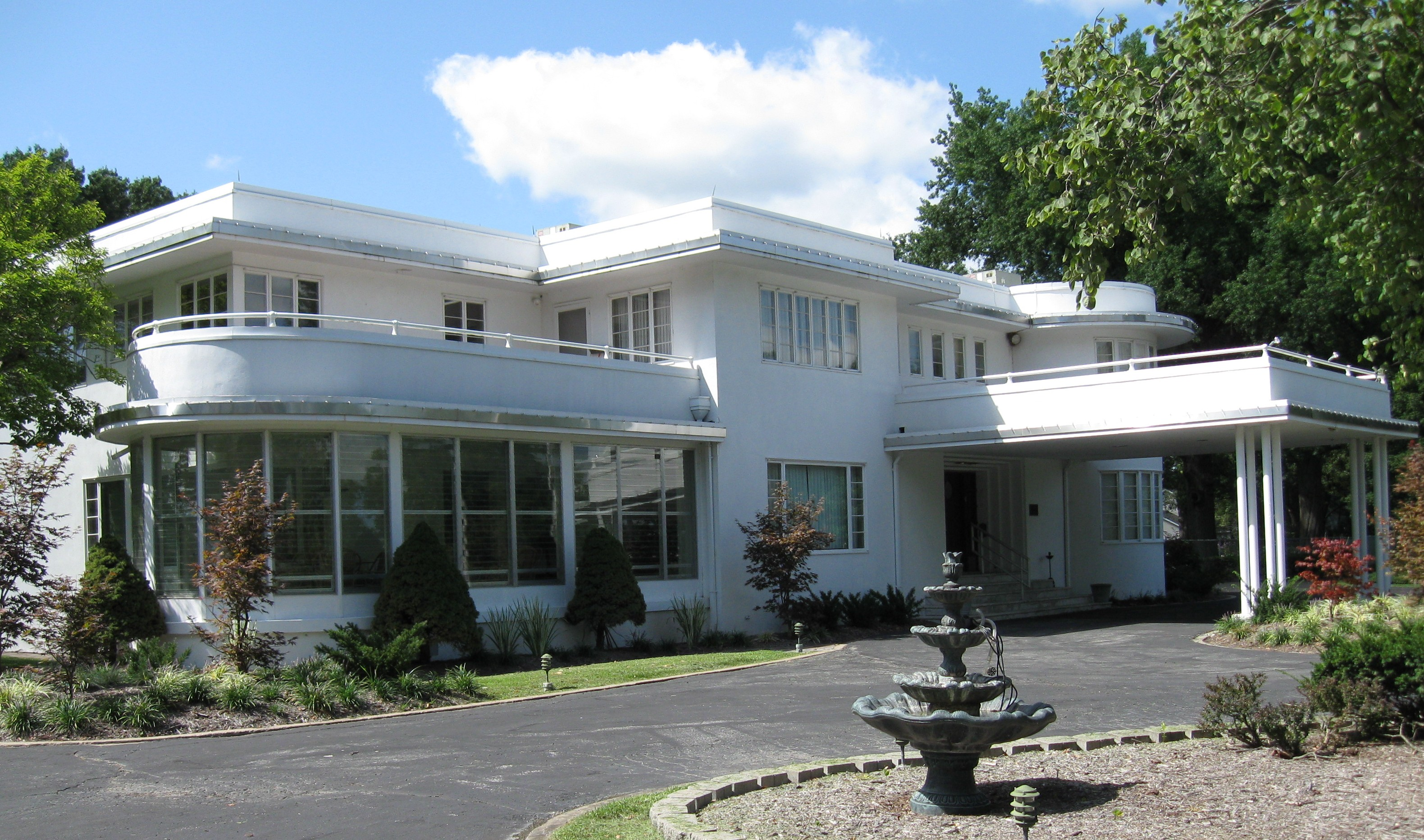
- Chatol, the A.B. Chance Guest House

- Seal
- Nicknames: Anchor City; Prairie Queen
- Motto: Anchor Capital of the World
- Location of Centralia, Missouri
- Coordinates: 39°12′39″N 92°08′03″W
- Country: United States
- State: Missouri
- Counties: Audrain, Boone
- Established: 1857

Government
  - Mayor: Chris Cox

Area
  - Total: 2.90 sq mi (7.50 km^{2})
  - Land: 2.90 sq mi (7.50 km^{2})
  - Water: 0 sq mi (0.00 km^{2})
- Elevation: 879 ft (268 m)

Population (2020)
  - Total: 4,541
  - Estimate (2023): 4,802
  - Density: 1,567.8/sq mi (605.33/km^{2})
- Time zone: UTC-6 (Central (CST))
  - Summer (DST): UTC-5 (CDT)
- ZIP code: 65240
- Area code: 573
- FIPS code: 29-12898
- GNIS feature ID: 2393789
- Website: www.centraliamo.gov

Centralia is a city in Boone County, Missouri, United States. The population was 4,541 at the 2020 census, with an estimated population of 4,244 in 2018. A very small portion of the city lies in Audrain County.

The Boone County portion of Centralia (which forms the majority of the city) is part of the Columbia Metropolitan Statistical Area, while a small part in Audrain County is part of the Mexico Micropolitan Statistical Area.

== Geography ==
According to the United States Census Bureau, the city has a total area of 2.84 square miles (7.36 km^{2}), all land.

== Demographics ==
Historical population
Census	Pop.	Note	%±
1880	703		—
1890	1,275		81.4%
1900	1,722		35.1%
1910	2,116		22.9%
1920	2,071		−2.1%
1930	2,009		−3.0%
1940	1,996		−0.6%
1950	2,460		23.2%
1960	3,200		30.1%
1970	3,623		13.2%
1980	3,537		−2.4%
1990	3,414		−3.5%
2000	3,774		10.5%
2010	4,027		6.7%
2020	4,541		12.8%

=== 2020 census ===
As of the 2020 census, Centralia had a population of 4,541. The median age was 37.0 years. 26.0% of residents were under the age of 18 and 17.7% of residents were 65 years of age or older. For every 100 females there were 89.3 males, and for every 100 females age 18 and over there were 84.9 males age 18 and over.

0.0% of residents lived in urban areas, while 100.0% lived in rural areas.

There were 1,808 households in Centralia, of which 35.2% had children under the age of 18 living in them. Of all households, 46.7% were married-couple households, 15.4% were households with a male householder and no spouse or partner present, and 30.3% were households with a female householder and no spouse or partner present. About 29.6% of all households were made up of individuals and 15.0% had someone living alone who was 65 years of age or older.

There were 1,930 housing units, of which 6.3% were vacant. The homeowner vacancy rate was 1.8% and the rental vacancy rate was 8.1%.

Racial composition as of the 2020 census
Race	Number	Percent
White	4,209	92.7%
Black or African American	51	1.1%
American Indian and Alaska Native	12	0.3%
Asian	18	0.4%
Native Hawaiian and Other Pacific Islander	4	0.1%
Some other race	18	0.4%
Two or more races	229	5.0%
Hispanic or Latino (of any race)	110	2.4%

=== 2010 census ===
As of the census of 2010, there were 4,027 people, 1,601 households, and 1,063 families living in the city. The population density was 1,418.0 inhabitants per square mile (547.5/km^{2}). There were 1,755 housing units at an average density of 618.0 units per square mile (238.6 units/km^{2}). The racial makeup of the city was 96.5% White, 1.0% African American, 0.4% Native American, 0.2% Asian, 0.5% from other races, and 1.3% from two or more races. Hispanic or Latino of any race were 1.6% of the population.

There were 1,601 households, of which 36.0% had children under the age of 18 living with them, 48.4% were married couples living together, 12.7% had a female householder with no husband present, 5.2% had a male householder with no wife present, and 33.6% were non-families. 28.3% of all households were made up of individuals, and 14.1% had someone living alone who was 65 years of age or older. The average household size was 2.47 and the average family size was 3.01.

The median age in the city was 38 years. 26.6% of residents were under the age of 18; 7.3% were between the ages of 18 and 24; 25.5% were from 25 to 44; 23% were from 45 to 64; and 17.7% were 66 years of age or older. The gender makeup of the city was 46.5% male and 53.5% female.

=== 2000 census ===
As of the census of 2000, there were 3,774 people, 1,505 households, and 1,032 families living in the city. The population density was 1,492.0 inhabitants per square mile (576.1/km^{2}). There were 1,648 housing units at an average density of 651.5 units per square mile (251.5 units/km^{2}). The racial makeup of the city was 97.11% White, 1.14% African American, 0.42% Native American, 0.08% Asian, 0.21% from other races, and 1.03% from two or more races. Hispanic or Latino of any race were 0.82% of the population.

There were 1,505 households, out of which 37.7% had children under the age of 18 living with them, 53.3% were married couples living together, 12.6% had a female householder with no husband present, and 31.4% were non-families. 27.7% of all households were made up of individuals, and 14.5% had someone living alone who was 65 years of age or older. The average household size was 2.45 and the average family size was 2.97.

In the city, the population was spread out, with 28.2% under the age of 18, 7.3% from 18 to 24, 27.9% from 25 to 44, 19.1% from 45 to 64, and 17.5% who were 65 years of age or older. The median age was 36 years. For every 100 females, there were 83.8 males. For every 100 females age 18 and over, there were 77.8 males.

The median income for a household in the city was $34,475, and the median income for a family was $40,671. Males had a median income of $30,399 versus $21,115 for females. The per capita income for the city was $17,583. About 2.8% of families and 4.5% of the population were below the poverty line, including 3.0% of those under age 18 and 8.0% of those age 65 or over.

== Economy ==
As of 2023, the largest industries in Centralia include Manufacturing, Education, and Agriculture. These sectors provide the bulk of local employment, with manufacturing being particularly significant due to the presence of the A.B. Chance Company. The median household income in Centralia is $51,868, and the city has a poverty rate of approximately 12%.

== Education ==
The Centralia R-VI School District operates four schools: Chance Elementary School (grades PK-2), Centralia Intermediate School (grades 3–5), Chester Boren Middle School (grades 6–8), and Centralia High School (grades 9–12). Centralia Intermediate School is the newest building of the four, having opened for classes in August 2009. It was constructed in order to deal with the district's increasing enrollment. This new technology-rich building contains 15 classrooms, each with 12 computers.

The town has a lending library, the Centralia Public Library.

== History ==
=== City origin ===
Centralia was laid out in 1857 and was named after its central location on the North Missouri Railroad from St. Louis to Ottumwa, Iowa, and from the fact that it was located near the center of a vast prairie between Mexico and Huntsville, and between Columbia and Paris.

=== Civil War ===
On September 27, 1864, 22 unarmed Union soldiers returning home on leave were pulled from a train in Centralia and executed by Confederate bushwhackers under William T. "Bloody Bill" Anderson. A Union force pursuing the guerrillas was ambushed, and about 150 were killed. The incident came to be known as the Centralia Massacre.

=== The A.B. Chance Company ===
The A.B. Chance Company was founded in 1907 by Albert Bishop Chance. He invented the first practical earth anchor. The company played a vital role in the growth of Centralia. Over the course of nearly 120 years, Chance has delivered pole line hardware, switches, cutouts and fuse links in addition to anchors, foundations, hot line tools, fiberglass and rubber products to the world-wide electricity transmission and distribution industry. Acquired by Hubbell in 1994, the Chance brand is manufactured in Centralia, Missouri.

The company still plays a major role in Centralia's economy with employing 860 people.

=== Registered Historic Places ===
The following Centralia locations have been listed on the National Register of Historic Places:

- Albert Bishop Chance House and Gardens
- Chatol

== Anchor Fest ==
Due to Centralia's rich history in earth anchors, there is a yearly celebration traditionally held the weekend after Memorial Day. Which involves rides, food , funnel cakes, arts and crafts and live music. There is also a parade of high school bands, local organizations, tractors and classic cars.

Anchor Fest was first launched in 1987. The festival has since grown into one of the community’s signature events, drawing visitors from across the region. After a two-year hiatus due to the COVID-19 pandemic, the festival returned in 2022.

== Media ==
Centralia is located within the Columbia/Jefferson City television and radio markets. As such, stations from those cities can be picked up here. Centralia is also home to two radio stations: K-Love affiliate KMFC 92.1 FM (with translator K293CI 106.5 FM in Columbia) owned by Educational Media Foundation; and Radio 74 Internationale affiliate KSDC-LP 94.9 FM owned by nearby Sunnydale Adventist Academy.

== Notable people ==
- Albert Bishop Chance, inventor of the earth anchor, mayor, and founder of the A.B. Chance Company.
- Cheryl Burnett, women's Final Four college basketball coach
- Chester G. Starr, an American historian
- Josephine Conger-Kaneko, an American journalist and writer
- Marshall Esteppe, an American amateur and professional wrestler
- John Augustus Hulen, an officer of the Texas National Guard
- Marcella Ng, the first African American woman pilot in the United States Armed Forces.
- Roy Glenwood Spurling, an American neurosurgeon

== See also ==
- List of cities in Missouri
