= Albert Bishop Chance =

Personal details
- Born: Albert Bishop Chance; May 26, 1873; Centralia, Missouri, U.S.
- Died: February 8, 1949 (aged 75) near Saint Petersburg, Florida, U.S.
- Spouse: Frances Chance (m. 1898)

Albert Bishop Chance (1873–1949) was an American businessman and the inventor of the first practical earth anchor. He founded the A.B. Chance Company in 1907 in his hometown of Centralia, Missouri, where he would also become mayor He invented the earth anchor after an ice storm knocked down his parents' company's telephone lines. He was a philanthropist to the University of Missouri, and participated in bringing the first hospital to Boone County. He was inducted into the Boone County Historical Society Hall of Fame in 2010. The Albert Bishop Chance House and Gardens were placed on the National Register of Historic Places in 1979.

The A.B. Chance Company would be acquired by Hubbell Incorporated in 1994. The Chance brand is still sold today.
