= Earth anchor =

Support device that is anchored to the ground

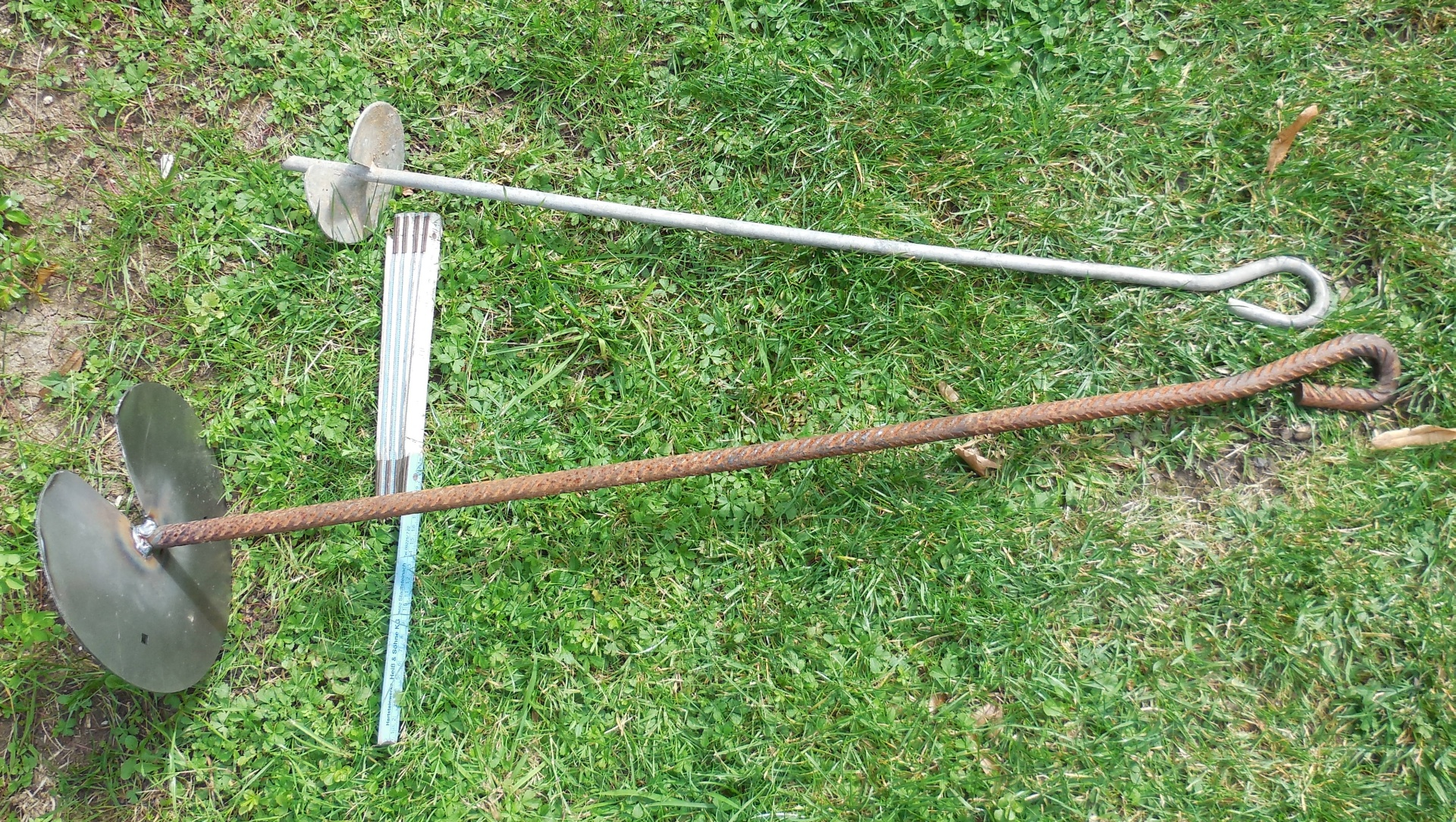
Single helix earth anchors

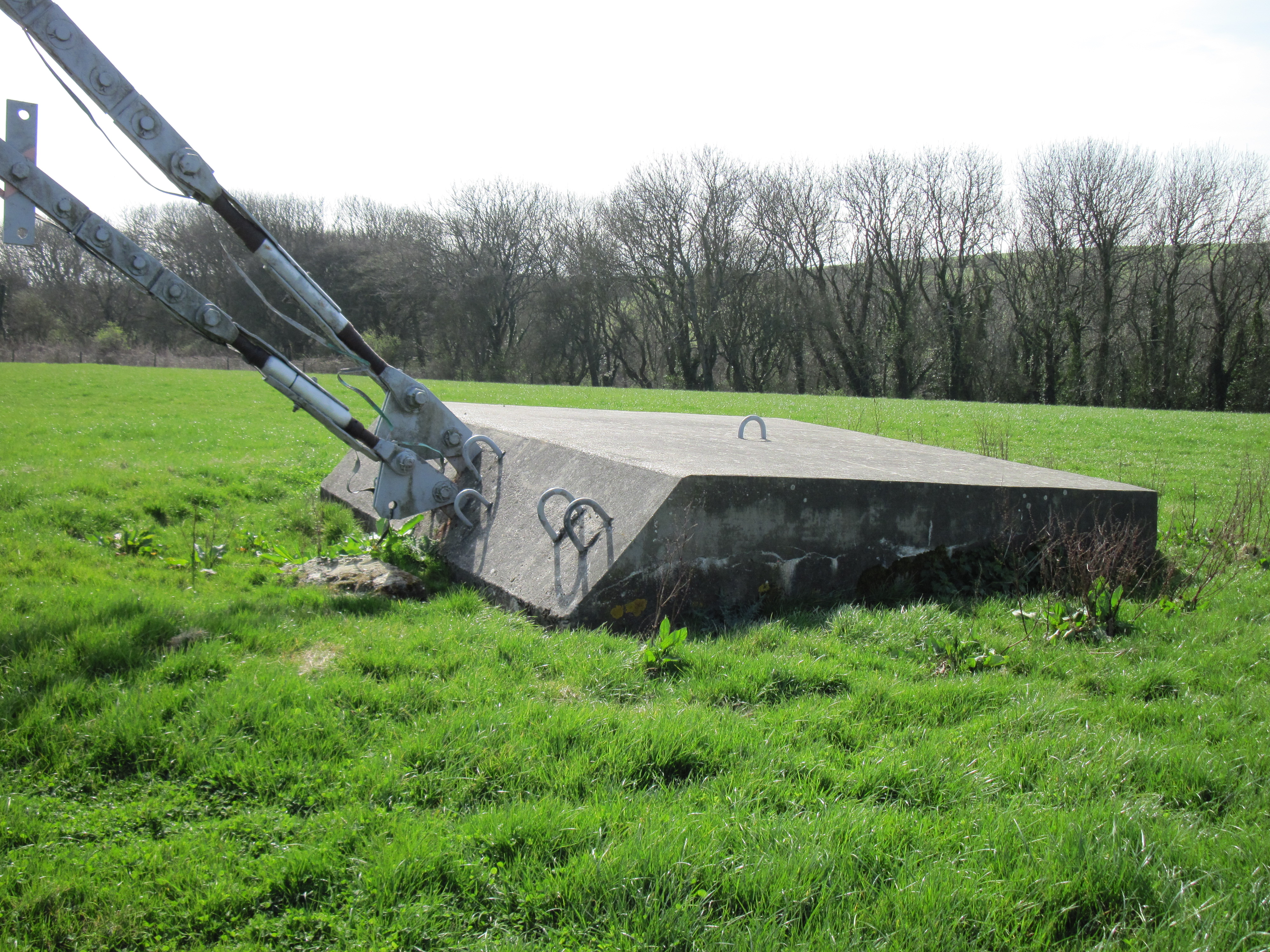
Guyed mast anchor

An earth anchor is a device designed to support structures, most commonly used in geotechnical and construction applications. Also known as a ground anchor, percussion driven earth anchor or mechanical anchor, it may be impact driven into the ground or run in spirally, depending on its design and intended force-resistance characteristics.

Earth anchors are used in both temporary or permanent applications, including supporting retaining walls, guyed masts, and circus tents.

== History ==
The first practical earth anchor was invented in 1912 by Albert Bishop Chance in Centralia, Missouri, in response to an ice storm that knocked down his company’s telephone poles. The town of Centralia holds an annual Anchor Day Festival.

== Applications ==
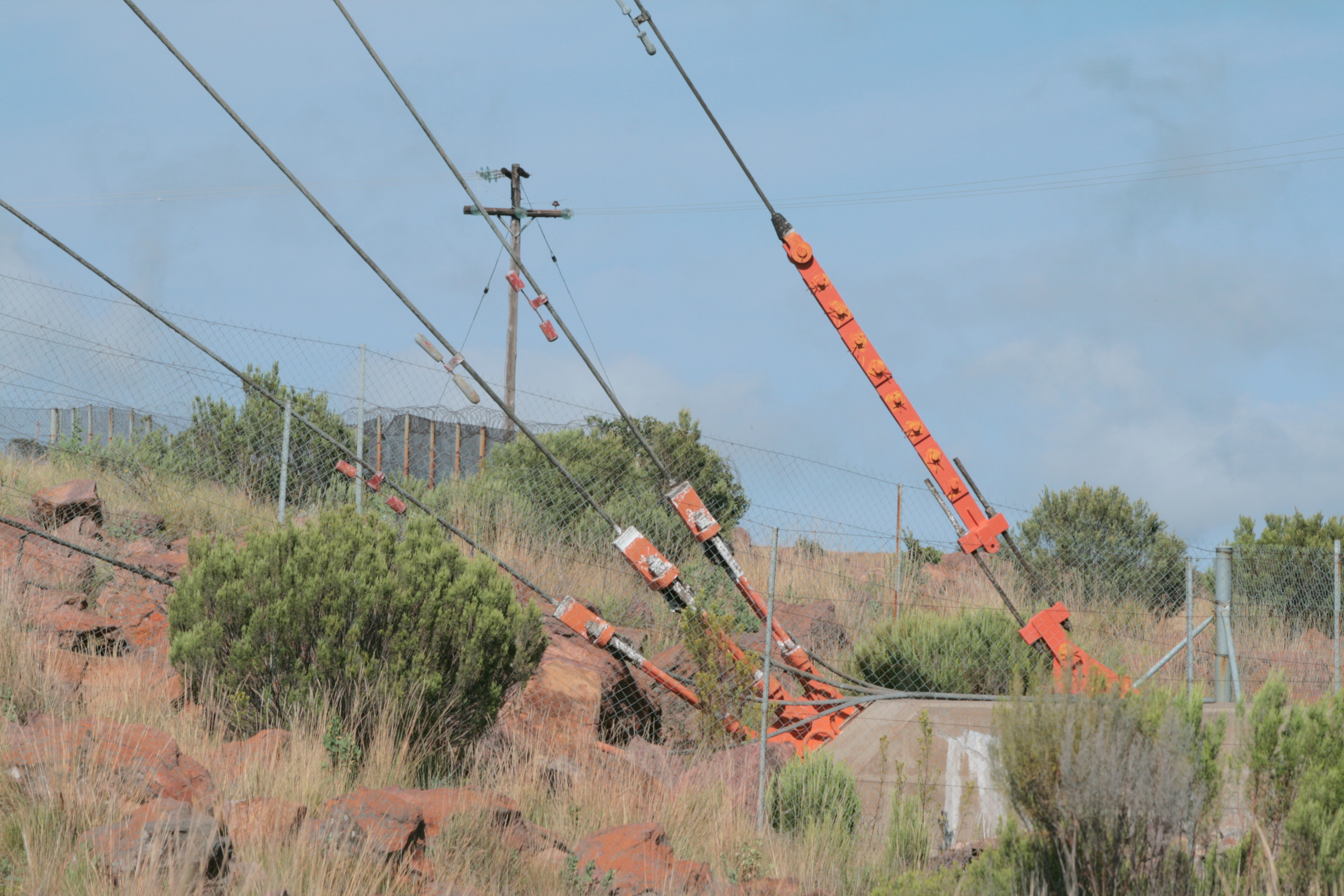
An earth anchor for guy wires on a guyed mast near Thabazimbi, South Africa

Earth anchors are typically used in civil engineering and construction projects, and have a variety of applications, including:

- Retaining walls, as part of erosion control systems.
- Structural support of temporary buildings and structures, such as circus tents and outdoor stages.
- Tethering marine structures, such as floating docks and pipelines.
- Supporting guyed masts, such as radio transmission towers.
- Anchoring utility poles and similar structures.
- Drainage systems, for load locking and restraining capability to happen simultaneously.
- Landscape, anchoring trees, often semi-mature transplants.
- General security, as in anchoring small aircraft.
- Sporting activities, such as slacklining or abseiling.

== Types ==
=== Deadman ===
A deadman is one of the simplest ground anchors in terms of equipment needed, and is suitable for light loads or temporary installations. It is a horizontal beam, such as a log or steel girder, or concrete block placed crosswise to the load and buried in a hole in the ground. It can be constructed with as little as a tree branch, adequate rope and adequate digging.

A deadman may also be placed on the surface, held in place by a number of picket stakes. This allows a greater load to be taken than a single row of pickets.

== Performance ==
Once installed and load-locked, an earth anchor exerts effort to the soil above it, with the soil in turn providing resistance. Upward soil compression created by the anchor is typically exerted in a frustum shaped cone, reflecting:

- The shear angle of the soil
- The depth at which the anchor has been installed
- The load applied to the anchor
- The size of the anchor and size and angle of its lateral surfaces

When angled these lateral surfaces generate greater cone-shaped soil resistance than a simple cylinder created by purely perpendicular design.

== Installation ==
Site analysis determining soil load resistance is often required before earth anchor installation. Included are depth that the anchor is to be driven, and soil strength, moisture content, and corrosivity. When appropriate, test installations are done to determine optimal anchor design or conformance with project specifications.

Installation methods differ depending on soil composition and moisture. Earth anchors are commonly driven into the ground using a drive rod and impact hammer. Pilot holes are required in denser soils. After an impact driven anchor has been installed, the drive rod is removed and the anchor load-locked, typically by rotating it ninety degrees. For lighter anchors a hand tool is often sufficient.
