= National Women's Day (disambiguation) =

National Women's Day is a South African public holiday.

National Women's Day may also refer to:

- National Woman's Day, U.S.A.
- National Women's Day (Tunisia)
- National Women's Day (Pakistan)
- National women's day (India)
- National Women's Day (East-Timor)

== See also ==
- International Women's Day
- Women's Day (disambiguation)
