= Girls' Day (disambiguation) =

Girls' Day, or Hinamatsuri, is a festival celebrated in Japan each year on 3 March.

Girls' Day may also refer to:

- International Day of the Girl Child
- Girl's Day, a South Korean girl group
- Girls' Day (Judaism), a holiday celebrated by some Jewish communities in the Middle East
- Girls' Day (China), a campus festival in China

== See also ==
- Women's Day (disambiguation)
