= Works by Sarojini Naidu =

Works by the Indian political activist and poet

Sarojini Naidu (13 February 1879 – 2 March 1949) was an Indian political activist and poet. A proponent of civil rights, women's emancipation, and anti-imperialistic ideas, she was an important figure in Indian independence movement. Naidu's work as a poet earned her the sobriquet 'the Nightingale of India' by Mahatma Gandhi because of colour, imagery, and lyrical quality of her poetry.

Naidu was proficient in Urdu, Telugu, English, Bengali, and Persian. Her command of poetry had brought her international acclamation, Naidu's literary contribution, particularly for her poems with the themes like patriotism, romanticism and lyric for which she is called "Nightingale of India"—(Bharat Kokila) by Mahatma Gandhi. Her birthday is celebrated in India as National women's day.

== Work ==
=== Plays ===
- Meher Muneer-(Persian) 1885

=== Essays ===
- Words of Freedom - Ideas of a Nation.

=== Books (English) ===
- 1905: The Golden Threshold, London: William Heineman
- 1912: The Bird of Time: Songs of Life, Death & the Spring, London: William Heineman and New York: John Lane Company
- 1917: The Broken Wing: Songs of Love, Death and the Spring, London: William Heinemann
- 1917: The Song of the Palanquin Bearers, lyrics by Naidu and music by Martin Shaw, London: Curwen
- 1918: The Speeches and Writings of Sarojini Naidu, Madras: G.A. Natesan and Company
- 1919: Mohammed Ali Jinnah: An Ambassador of Unity His Speeches and Writings 1912-1917, Madras: Ganesh and Company.
- 1928: The Sceptred Flute: Songs of India, New York: Dodd, Mead, and Company.
- 1961: The Feather of the Dawn, authored by Naidu in 1927, edited by Padmaja Naidu, her daughter, Bombay: Asia Publishing House.

== Other works ==
- Speeches and Writings of Sarojini Naidu.
- The Lady of the Lake (1300 lines poem) written in her childhood.
- The Indian Weavers, (1971) is a short poem published posthumously.
