= Women's Day =

Women's Day or Woman's Day may refer to:

== Media ==
- Woman's Day, a U.S. magazine published since 1931
- Woman's Day (Australian magazine), published since 1953

== Holidays ==
- International Women's Day, on March 8
- National Woman's Day, a predecessor of International Women's Day in the United States
- National Women's Day, celebrated in South Africa on August 9
- National Women's Day, celebrated in Bolivia on October 11
- National Women's Day, celebrated in East Timor on November 3
- Vietnamese Women's Day, celebrated in Vietnam on 20 October
- The Combined Holidays of Women's Day and Children's Day, celebrated in Taiwan on April 4
- Sepandārmazgān, "Women's Day" or "Nurses Day" in Iran

== Other uses ==
- Women's day massacre, an incident in Youngstown, Ohio on 19 June 1937
- Women's One Day International, a limited overs form of women's cricket

== See also ==
- National Women's Day (disambiguation)
- Women's Sunday, suffragette march in London on 21 June 1908
- Girls' Day (disambiguation)
- International Men's Day, November 19
