= Schroth =

Schroth is a German surname of several origins rellated to the literal meaning "rut, stab". It particular, as a nickname for tailor. It may refer to:

- Carl-Heinz Schroth (1902–1989), German actor and film director
- Frances Schroth (1893–1961), American swimmer and Olympic competitor
- Frank D. Schroth, (1884–1974), American newspaper publisher
- George Schroth (1899–1989), American water polo player and Olympic competitor
- Hannelore Schroth (1922–1987), German film actress
- Heinrich Schroth (1871–1945), German stage and film actor
- Johann Schroth (1798–1856), Austrian naturopath
- Lajos Schróth (b. 1960), Hungarian former professional football player
- Markus Schroth (b. 1975), German football player
- Thomas N. Schroth (1920–2009), American reporter
- Walther Schroth (1882–1944), German General der Infanterie in the Wehrmacht during World War II
