= Ehrenhalt =

Ehrenhalt is a surname. Notable people with the surname include:

- Alan Ehrenhalt (born 1947), American journalist and non-fiction author
- Amaranth Ehrenhalt (1928–2021), American painter, sculptor, and writer
