= Marion Craig Wentworth =

American poet

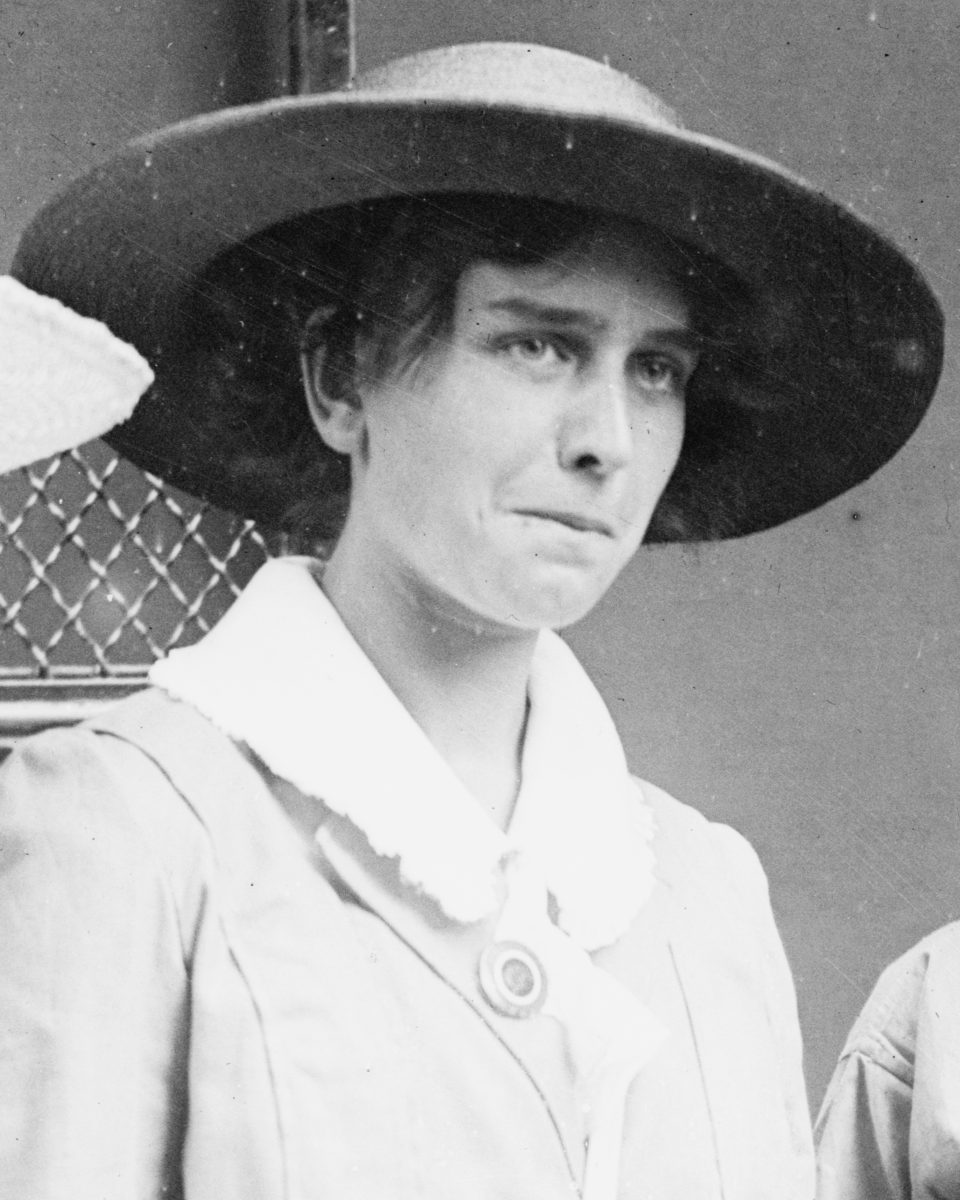
- Wentworth on the cover of The Socialist Woman magazine, April 1908.
- Born: Marion Craig; January 25, 1872; St. Paul, Minnesota, U.S.
- Died: October 4, 1942 (aged 70); Orange County, California, U.S.
- Education: University of Minnesota; Curry College
- Known for: Playwright, poet
- Spouse: Franklin Wentworth (m. 1900)

Marion Craig Wentworth (January 25, 1872 - October 4, 1942) was an American playwright, poet, and suffragist. She is best known for her feminist anti-war play, War Brides, which was made into a silent film starring Alla Nazimova in 1916.

== Early life and education ==
She was born in Minnesota in 1872 and graduated from the University of Minnesota in 1894. She later studied at the Curry School of Expression (now Curry College), and stayed on in Boston to teach expression. She married in 1900, had a son, and divorced in 1912.

== Career ==
Wentworth was a socialist and a feminist whose writing often addressed social issues. Her 1912 play, The Flower Shop, takes up the cause of women's suffrage. In the years leading up to World War I, she traveled the country to raise support for the suffrage movement by giving dramatic readings. She often read from Votes for Women!, a pro-suffrage play by Elizabeth Robins, portraying multiple characters that ranged from "the doughty women's trade union leader with the cockney dialect" to "the bright, little, pertinacious middle-class 'Suffragette,' with her high-pitched volubility on the platform". In April 1908 she was featured on the cover of The Socialist Woman, a magazine edited by Josephine Conger-Kaneko, who considered her "among the best women artists of the Socialist movement."

In addition to readings, she also gave lectures. In March 1915 she addressed a meeting of the Boston Equal Suffrage Association for Good Government; the other speakers were Julia Lathrop, director of the U.S. Children's Bureau, and Boston NAACP president Butler R. Wilson.

=== War Brides ===
In 1915 Wentworth published her best known play, War Brides, in which a pregnant war widow commits suicide rather than bear more children for a nation that allows her no say in its decision-making. At one point she confronts an army captain, arguing,

You tear our husbands, our sons from us—you never ask us to help you find a better way—and haven't we anything to say?...If we can bring forth the men for the nation, we can sit with you in your councils and shape the destiny of the nation, and say whether it is to war or peace we give the sons we bear.

The dedication reads, "To my little boy Brandon."

War Brides was one of the most successful plays of 1915. It opened in January at B.F. Keith's Palace Theatre in New York City, with Alla Nazimova in the lead role, and toured the country for several months. The play was so much in demand that a second production toured the South, with Gilda Varesi in the lead.

In 1916 the play was made into a silent film, War Brides, starring Nazimova in her first onscreen role. The film did very well in the United States, bringing the studios a profit of $300,000, and was widely acclaimed by critics. Because of its pacifist message, it was banned in some cities and states. In 1917 it was withdrawn from circulation on the grounds that "The philosophy of this picture is so easily misunderstood by unthinking people". Later that year the producer, Lewis Selznick, had the film edited to give it an anti-German slant, and re-released it to American theaters. It was not shown in any other Allied countries.

== Later years ==
Wentworth published several more plays and a collection of poems, Iridescent Days. In her later years she did a great deal of traveling, which is reflected in her poetry. She died in 1942.

== Works ==
- The Flower Shop: A Play in Three Acts, 1912
- War Brides: A Play in One Act, 1915
- The Midnight Meeting at Versailles, 1919
- What If They Could: A Radio Whimsey in One Act, 1927
- The Golden Touch: A Play for Young People by Young People; With an Appendix on Group Play-Making, 1927
- The Princess and the Goblins: A Dramatization of the Story by George MacDonald, 1930
- Iridescent Days: Poems, 1939
- The Blue Cape: A Play in One Act, 1940
