= Ethel Whitehead =

American suffragette and Socialist Party representative

Ethel Whitehead (1872 - ?) was an American suffragette and Socialist Party representative who ran for lieutenant-governor of Kansas in the August 1916 primary and general elections. Whitehead's play "The Arrest of Suffrage", written in 1912, appeared in the September 1912 issue of The Progressive Woman, and was later published in an anthology of U.S. suffrage literature by Chapman and Mills in 2011. While Whitehead did not win the 1916 election, she was an active member of the Socialist Party of America as a California delegate, with her efforts particularly concentrating on the reformation of schools. As a socialist-feminist, Whitehead constituted an intersectional presence in the Women's Movement that bound together cross-class organizations of education, social welfare politics, and economic industry.

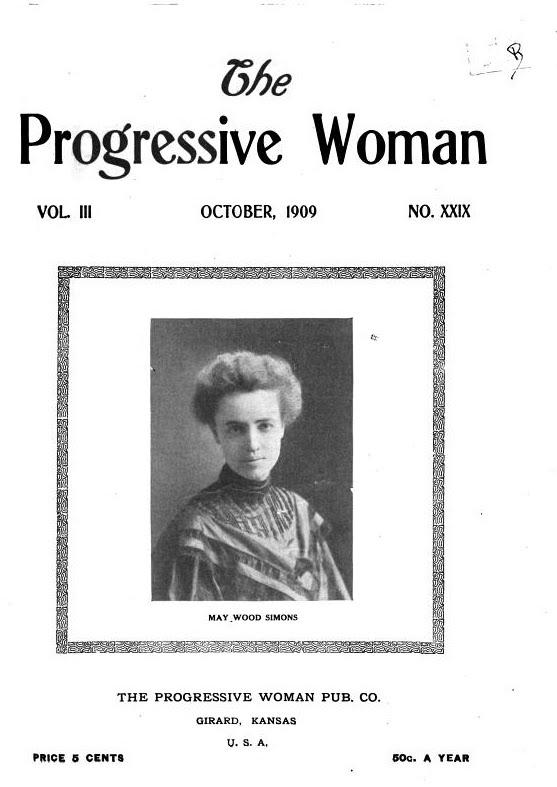
October 1909 issue cover of The Progressive Woman

== Career ==
In 1885, Whitehead immigrated to California from England and quickly became involved in activist work there. She served as the President of the Woman's Socialist Union of California (WSUC) in 1908-1909, as well as the founder and president of the Los Angeles Children's Socialist Lyceum, a Socialist Sunday School (SSS). These schools were part of a larger pedagogical effort to supplement public school education with socialist-oriented curriculum and service; in between 1900 and 1920, there existed approximately a hundred of these institutions, intended for young children from working-class families, in America alone.

At the 1912 National Socialist Convention, Whitehead gave the following address about the necessity of SSS institutions as California delegate:

The Socialist Sunday School of Williamsbridge, Bronx, New York, established in 1911

"In organization among children the work must be always under the supervision of adults; the purpose of such organization to teach children the principles of Socialism and enable them to become versed in parliamentary usage; the whole plan to develop confidence and individual expression in the young." – Ethel Whitehead, National Convention of the Socialist Party (1912)

Whitehead also authored "When The Cry Was Stilled: a fairy story play for young socialists", published by the Young People's Socialist League of Chicago sometime between 1900 and 1915. Dramatic scripts like these, or "playlets", were often used for school festivals, fundraising events, or other recreational uses, centered around tenets of Socialism and were incorporated into the schools' curriculum.

=== The Way to Happiness ===
Whitehead published a book of her own plays, "The Way to Happiness: A drama in two acts (and other plays)", printed sometime between 1907 and 1913 by The Socialist Woman Publishing Company (the Kansas-based publishing house for The Progressive Woman). Besides the titular work, the collection included the following plays:

- "Columbia's garden"
- "The stuff that heroes are made of"
- "Patchwork"
- "The red flag"
- "The voice of the people" (by Ella Wheeler Wilcox)
- "Woman" (by Arthur Bridwell)

=== The Arrest of Suffrage ===
Whitehead is most widely recognized for her 1912 political play, which grapples with the rifts created by differences in the agendas of socialists versus that of suffragists, as well as the internal class differences in group constituencies.

The short piece depicts the conversations between active suffragist Adelaide, the working-class ally Molly, and the socially privileged "antis" Mrs. Smythe and Mrs. Brown. Molly's unrefined, heavily dialectic speech disrupts the antis' discussion concerning the suffrage movement and the unwanted responsibilities it will thrust upon them in threatening domestic partnerships and the "sanctity of [the] home". In her speech, Molly disavows the ethical implications of suppressing suffrage in the pretense of keeping social "peace", as it does so at expense of marginalizing the laboring class. She ultimately foregrounds the necessity of suffrage as a mode of empowerment, regardless of material protections one is afforded.

Early on in the play, Whitehead explicitly references The Progressive Woman as one of the journals Adelaide is distributing.
