= CQ Press =

American publishing company

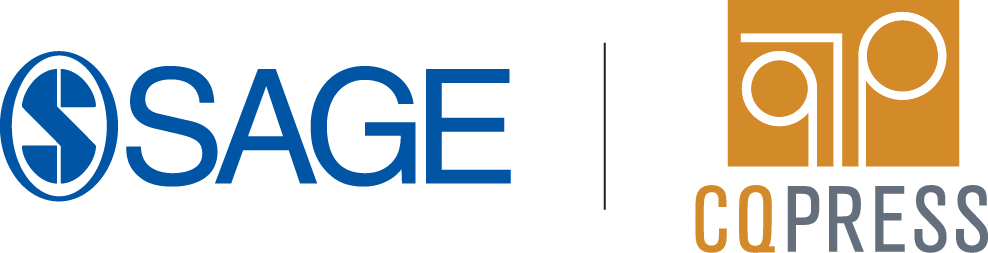
- Parent company: SAGE Publishing
- Founder: Nelson Poynter
- Country of origin: United States
- Headquarters location: Washington, D.C.
- Official website: www.cqpress.com

CQ Press, a division of SAGE Publishing, publishes books, directories, periodicals, and electronic products on American government and politics, with an expanding list in international affairs and journalism and mass communication.

== History ==
Nelson Poynter, former journalist and owner of the St. Petersburg Times, and his wife Henrietta, founded Congressional Quarterly in 1945. Poynter's vision for Congressional Quarterly was to make transparent the happenings within the government and Washington, DC. Poynter established the Modern Media Institute, now known as the Poynter Institute, with the mission of promoting democracy through education to journalists and other media leaders. After Poynter's death in 1978, the Institute received controlling stock of the St. Petersburg Times and ownership of CQ.

In May 2008, CQ Press was purchased from Congressional Quarterly by SAGE Publications in its entirety. SAGE is an international publisher of journals, books, and electronic media for academic, educational, and professional markets. A privately owned corporation, SAGE has offices in Los Angeles, London, New Delhi, and Singapore, in addition to the CQ Press office in Washington, DC.

== Awards ==
CQ Researcher, a print and online periodical covering social and political issues, won the ABA Silver Gavel Award in 2002 for its series on liberty and justice.

== Products ==
=== College Publishing Group ===
The CQ Press College Publishing Group publishes political science textbooks. The group has recently expanded its offerings to include works on public administration, international studies, journalism and mass communication.

=== Reference Information Group ===
The CQ Press Reference Information Group publishes content designed for the library market. These publications provide information focusing on U.S. government, world affairs, communication, political science, and business, with a growing focus on digital content.

=== Professional Division ===
The CQ Press Professional Division produces staff directories, sources for biographical and contact information on the people who work in federal, congressional, and judicial offices. Included among the directories published is the CQ Press Staff Directories series, consisting of the Congressional Staff Directory, the Federal Staff Directory, and the Judicial Staff Directory. These publications contain contact information on the federal government. The Congressional Staff Directory has been published continuously since 1959, the Federal Staff Directory since 1982, and the Judicial Staff Directory since 1986. Each directory in the series features multiple print editions throughout the year and is complemented with Web-based daily updates. In 2011, the division introduced its latest product: First Street, a political intelligence platform for advocacy professionals. The First Street Research Group (FSRG) reviews, investigates, and analyzes the data in First Street to publish exclusive reports and analysis on the people and organizations influencing policy in Washington, DC.

==== Directories ====
CQ Press published directories with contact information for the federal government for over fifty years. The directories were commonly known around the Nation's capital as “Red Books”, because of their red covers. In 2012, Leadership Directories, Inc. (now named Leadership Connect) acquired these directories.

Congressional Staff Directory: With over 16,000 records, Congressional Staff Directory contains entries for all U.S. Senators and Representatives with expanded biographies, photographs, leadership positions, staff members, and contact information.

Federal Staff Directory: CQ Press's Federal Staff Directory is a reference for contacts in the Executive Office of the President, the Cabinet, independent agencies, and quasi-official agencies.

Judicial Staff Directory: A guide to move than 28,000 individuals in National Courts, the Federal Court, Bankruptcy Courts, and State Appellate Courts.

Federal Collection: The collection includes Congressional, Federal, Judicial, and Homeland Security Staff Directories online.

Worldwide Government Directory: contact information for top government leaders across the globe. The directory contains information for countries’ defense ministries, key intergovernmental organizations, U.S. Embassies and missions abroad, and foreign embassies in the U.S.

Directory of State Court Clerks & County Courthouses: Offers access to information including court decisions, real estate records, UCC and tax liens, criminal convictions and other important records.

Federal-State Court Directory: Contains all U.S. appellate and district judges and clerks of court, U.S. magistrate judges, and bankruptcy judges’ staff directory information in one convenient book.

"CQ Press" is a trademark of Congressional Quarterly Inc.
