= Schrot =

Schrot is a German surname, a variant of Schroth, of several origins. It may refer to:

- Jacob Schrot (born 1990), German civil servant
- Martin Schrot (?-c. 1576), German goldsmith and engraver
