= Nila Mack =

American actress (1891–1953)

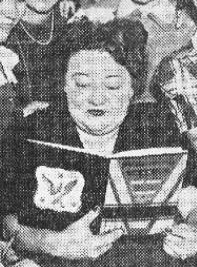
Nila Mack in a 1944 advertisement

Nila Mack (October 24, 1891, in Arkansas City, Kansas – January 20, 1953, in New York, New York) was the creator and director of Let's Pretend, the long-running CBS radio series for children. She served as the Director of Children's Programs for CBS from 1930 to 1953.

Born as Nila Mac, she was an only child. She added a "k" to her name because she felt "Mac" looked like a nickname. However, some sources, including her obituary in The New York Times, stated her birth name as Nila MacLoughlin. Her mother, Margaret, was a dance instructor, and her father, Don Carlos, was a railroad engineer who died in a train accident when Nila was very young. After his death, she attended an Illinois finishing school, Ferry Hall in Lake Forest, and later took classes in both Arkansas City and Boston, financing her education by playing the piano at her mother’s dance studio.

== Vaudeville to Broadway ==
She joined a traveling repertory company where she met and married actor Roy Briant. She worked in vaudeville and spent six years with the Nazimova company, appearing with that troupe on Broadway in Fair and Warmer and A Doll’s House, as well as the play and film versions of War Brides (1918). When her husband died in December 1927, after 13 years of their marriage, Mack took various acting jobs and wrote comedy for Nydia Westman and Fanny Brice.

== Radio ==
“Broadway prepared me for radio,” said Mack, who was cast in CBS’ experimental Radio Guild of the Air, the series that evolved into the Columbia Workshop, and a CBS comedy show, Nit Wits. She scripted and narrated the Night Club Romances series.

In 1930, Mack returned to Arkansas City to care for her ailing mother and began working at the local radio station. However, after six months, she was contacted by CBS to take over its children’s program, The Adventures of Helen and Mary. Mack moved back to New York and began to retool the struggling program. Cast member Gwen Davies recalled that initially Mack “was terrified about working with children, because she never had any.” Eventually, she changed the content and casting, assembling a company of child actors, and retitling the series as Let's Pretend. The focus was on fantasy. She recalled, “We were deep in the depression when Let’s Pretend began… I remembered fairy stories that filled me with wonder when I was very young. I figured that if these lively pieces with a message at their hearts had meant so much to me, other children would like them, too.” In addition to original scripts, the series broadcast more than 300 fairy tale adaptations. Cream of Wheat signed on as the program's sponsor.

Cast member Arthur Anderson wrote that she realized:

...how much better would be a cast of child actors, who could convey much more than grownups the openness, innocence, and simplicity she wanted for the show... Besides Nila Mack’s scripts, her genius for choosing and working with her juvenile cast was the main reason the show survived longer than any other dramatic program on American radio. Nila Mack was... a lone woman in a man’s world.

== Awards ==
With the success of Let's Pretend, CBS appointed her Director of Children's Programs. The series ran from 1934 to 1954, garnering numerous awards, including two Peabody Awards, a Women’s National Radio Committee Award, and five Radio Daily Awards.

Nila Mack died of a heart attack in her Manhattan apartment on January 20, 1953.

== Watch ==
- Actor Larry Robinson on Nila Mack as a director.

== Listen to ==
- Let's Pretend: "Jack and the Beanstalk" {October 26, 1946}
