= Frank D. Schroth =

American newspaper publisher

Frank D. Schroth (October 18, 1884 – June 10, 1974) was an American newspaper publisher who owned and operated the Brooklyn Eagle from 1938 until its demise in 1955 after a strike by The Newspaper Guild.

== Life and career ==
Schroth was born on October 18, 1884, in Trenton, New Jersey, and attended the local public schools. He started in the newspaper industry at The True American. He was hired as general news and political reporter the next year by The Trenton Times, working at the paper until 1914. From 1914 to 1925, he was secretary of the New Jersey State Board of Taxes and Assessments. He acquired The Trenton State Gazette in 1925 and served as its associate publisher and general manager until 1933.

Schroth purchased the Eagle on August 1, 1938, from M. Preston Goodfellow, who had purchased the paper himself in 1932. A statement published in the paper to announce the sale indicated Schroth's faith in the viability of the newspaper and in Brooklyn as a community. In addition to dropping the word "Daily" from the paper's title, Schroth increased the paper's profile and readership with more active local coverage. The Newspaper Guild went on strike in 1955, with the paper publishing what turned out to be its last issue on January 29. On March 17, Schroth announced that he had made the "irrevocable" decision to shut down the publication, as the paper had been "destroyed" by the Newspaper Guild and its 47-day-long strike. Efforts by the Federal Mediation and Conciliation Service to mediate the dispute had been unsuccessful. Strikers had been seeking increases of $3.40 per week in the first year of the deal and an additional $2.40 in the second year, while Schroth had offered increases of $1.40 and $1.00 per week for each of the two years.

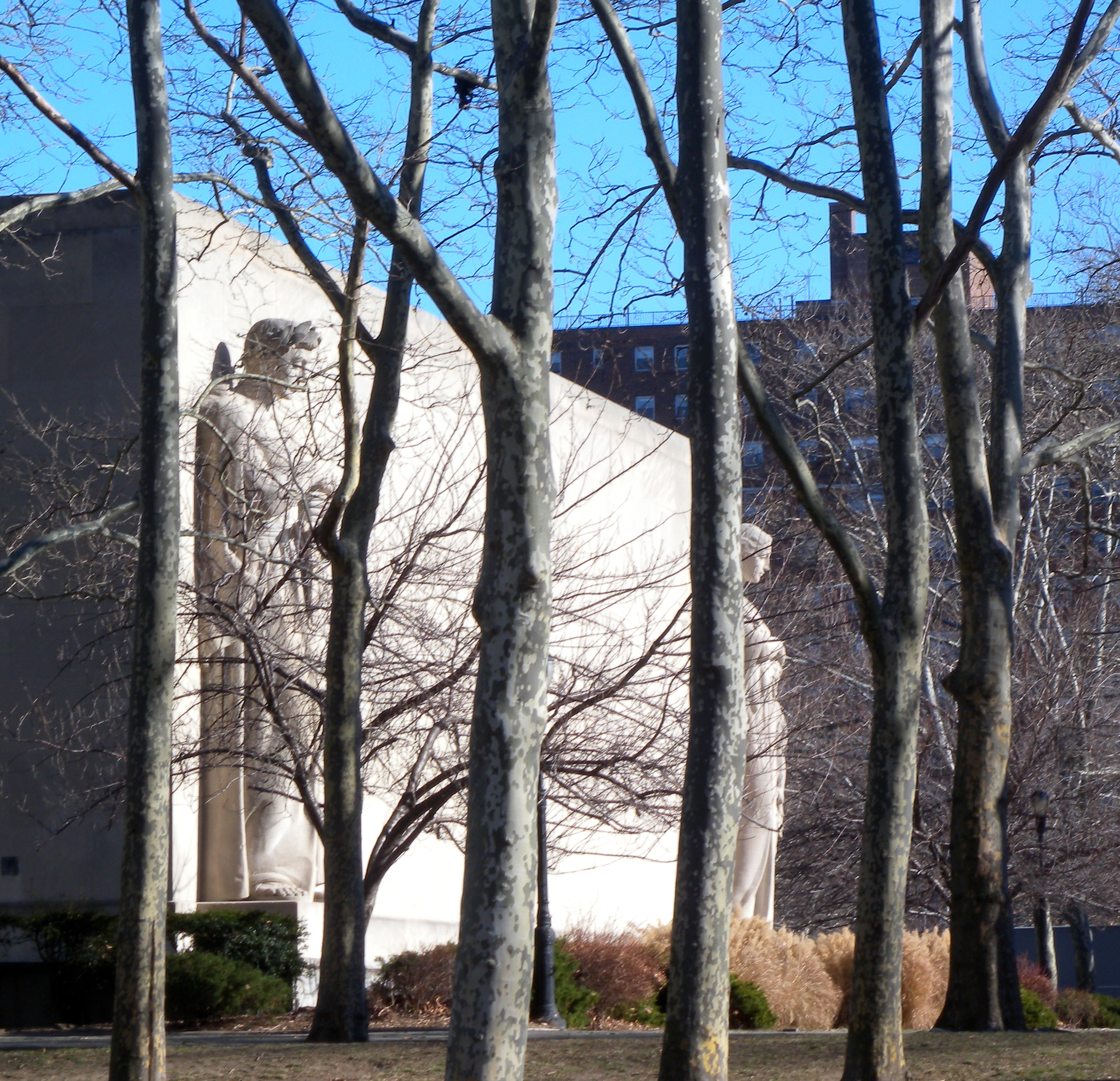
Brooklyn War Memorial

At the Eagle, Schroth was an active part of the Brooklyn community, organizing campaign drives and serving as chairman of the local chapter of the American Red Cross and as a trustee of Pratt Institute. He received the Silver Medal of Merit for his participation as chairman of the War Finance public relations committee and made a 1945 tour of the Pacific Theater of Operations to meet with top military staff. He was one of the originators behind the creation of the Brooklyn war memorial erected in Cadman Plaza.

=== Personal life ===
He moved back to Trenton after the Eagle closed and died on June 10, 1974, at a nursing home in New Milford, Connecticut. He was survived by three sons, 26 grandchildren and 8 great-grandchildren. Schroth's daughter, Sister Marie Eustelle of the Order of Sisters of Charity, died on October 19, 1940, in Elizabeth, New Jersey, after a long illness.

His son, Thomas N. Schroth, was managing editor of the Brooklyn Eagle in the last three years of its existence, and went on to serve as editor of Congress Quarterly and to establish the National Journal.

A nephew, the Rev. Raymond A. Schroth SJ, was a Jesuit priest and the dean of The College of the Holy Cross, Worcester, Massachusetts, in the early 1980s.
