= Cloakmaker =

Garment industry worker

A Cloak maker worked in the garment industry, often in an enterprise whose workers were represented by a union.

In the 1920s, there were more than 50,000 people employed as cloakmakers.

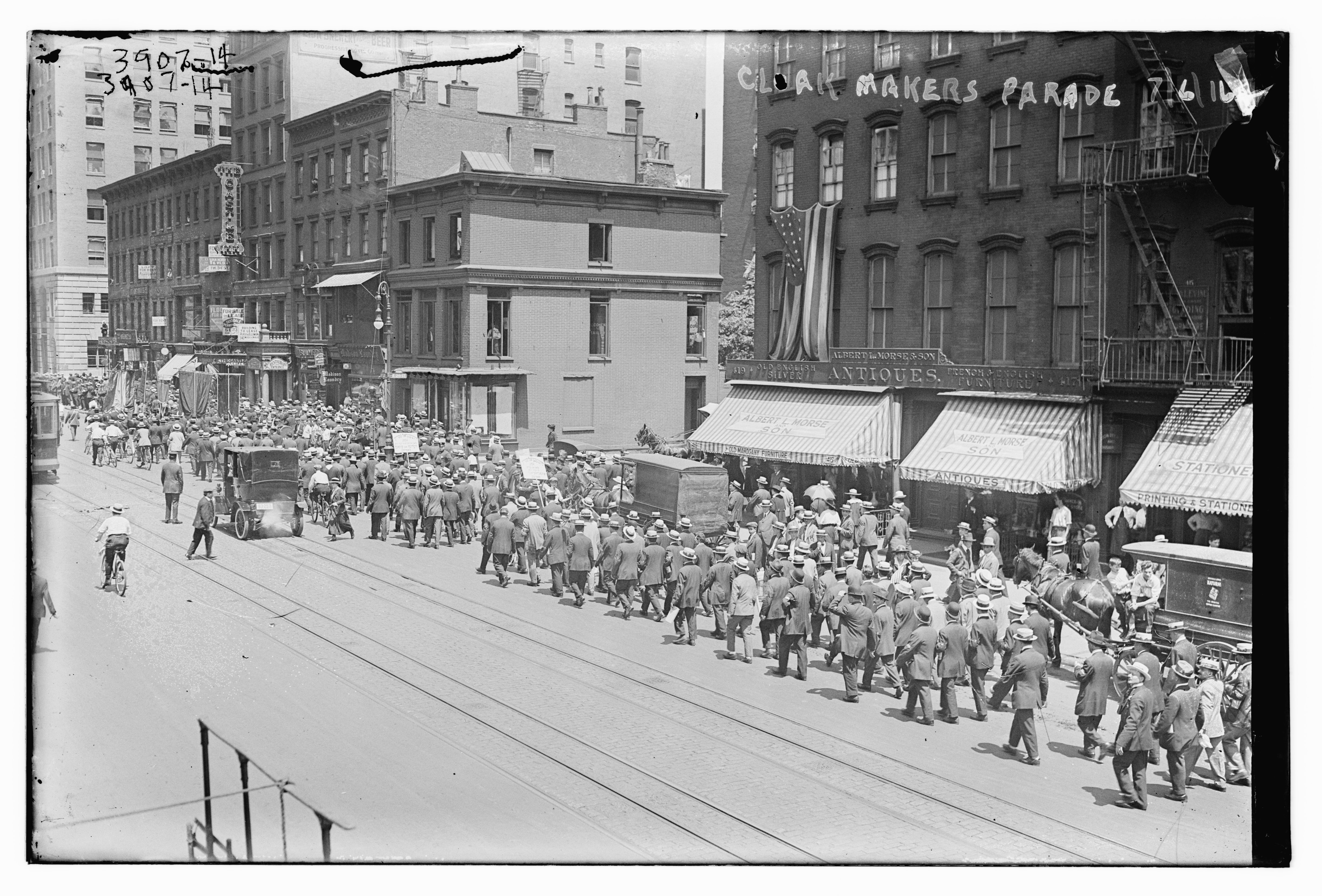
Cloakmakers' parade, New York City, 1916

Much of this industry was centered in New York City. While most of the cloakmakers were Jewish women, the next largest group, although much smaller in number, were Italian women.

Cloakmakers were a part of those known as clothing-workers, including those who made cloaks, suits and skirts.

Other areas where this industry was strong included Chicago and Cincinnati.

== Unions ==
Suffragist Theresa Malkiel organized a union of cloakmakers in 1892. Other areas of the needle trade were not unionized until years later, of whom in 1912 over 80% were Jewish.

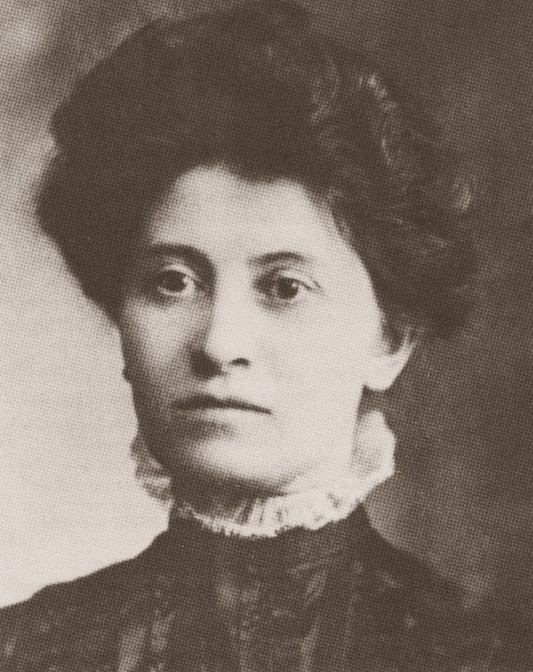
Cloakmaker, Suffragist, labor activist and author Theresa Serber Malkiel, who organized the Infant Cloakmaker's Union of New York in 1892

This occupation involved making or repairing garments that contained animal fur. The high end of this profession focused on fur coats. A 1915 New York Times article about 75,000 garment workers said "Cloakmakers take the lead."

The garment industry's strikes were neither rare nor long-lasting.

== Sources ==
- Miller, Sally M. (December 1978). "From Sweatshop Worker to Labor Leader: Theresa Malkiel, A Case Study". American Jewish History. 68 (2). The Johns Hopkins University Press: 189–205. JSTOR 23881894.
