= Congressional Quarterly =

American political publication

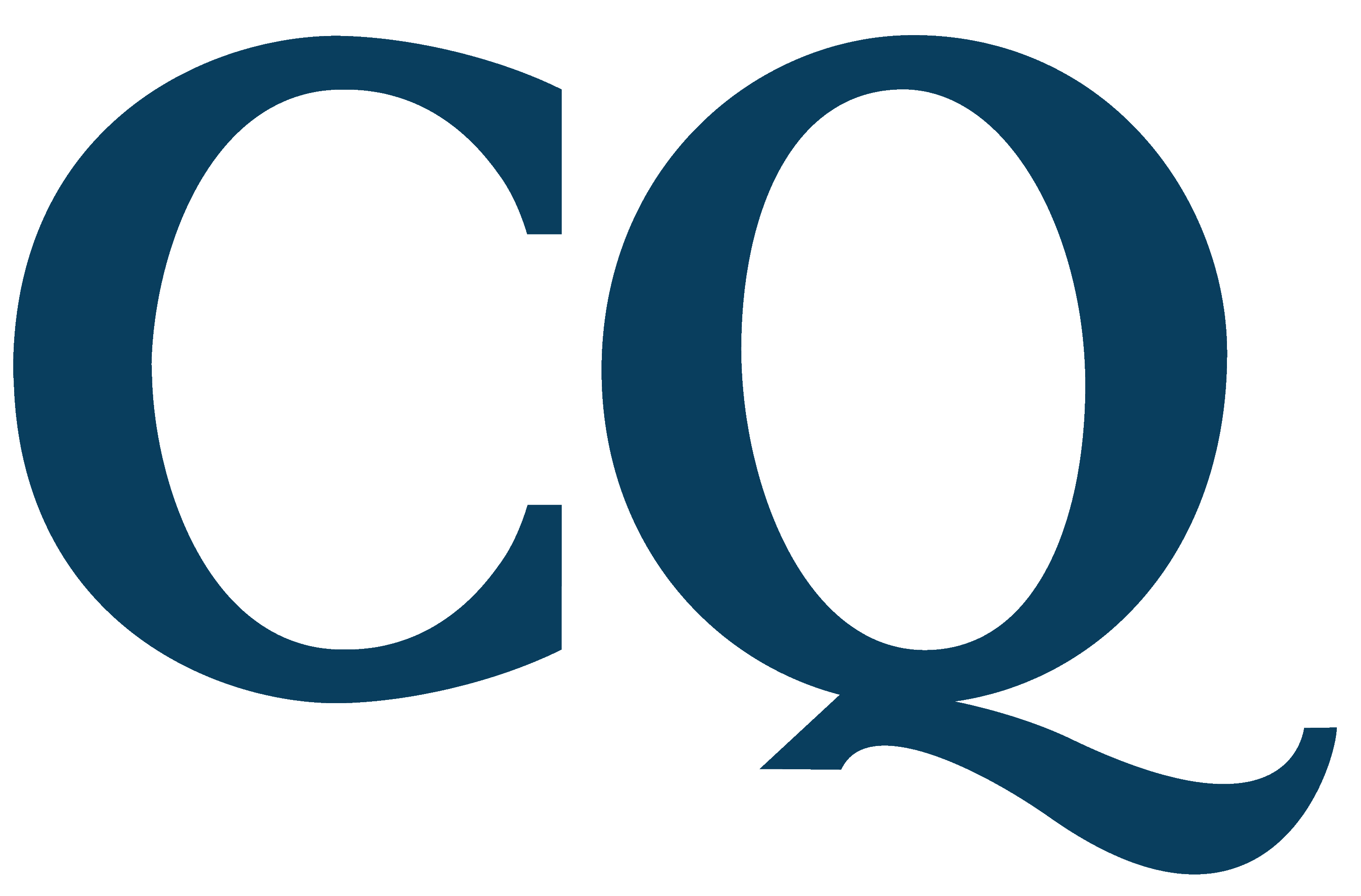
- Type: Subsidiary
- Industry: Congressional services
- Founded: 1945; 81 years ago
- Founders: Nelson Poynter; Henrietta Poynter
- Headquarters: 1201 Pennsylvania Avenue NW, Washington, D.C., U.S.
- Parent: FiscalNote
- Website: info.cq.com

Congressional Quarterly, or CQ, is an American publication that is part of FiscalNote, Inc, which covers the United States Congress. CQ was formerly acquired by the U.K.-based Economist Group and combined with Roll Call to form CQ Roll Call in 2009. FiscalNote acquired CQ Roll Call in 2018.

== History ==
=== 20th century ===
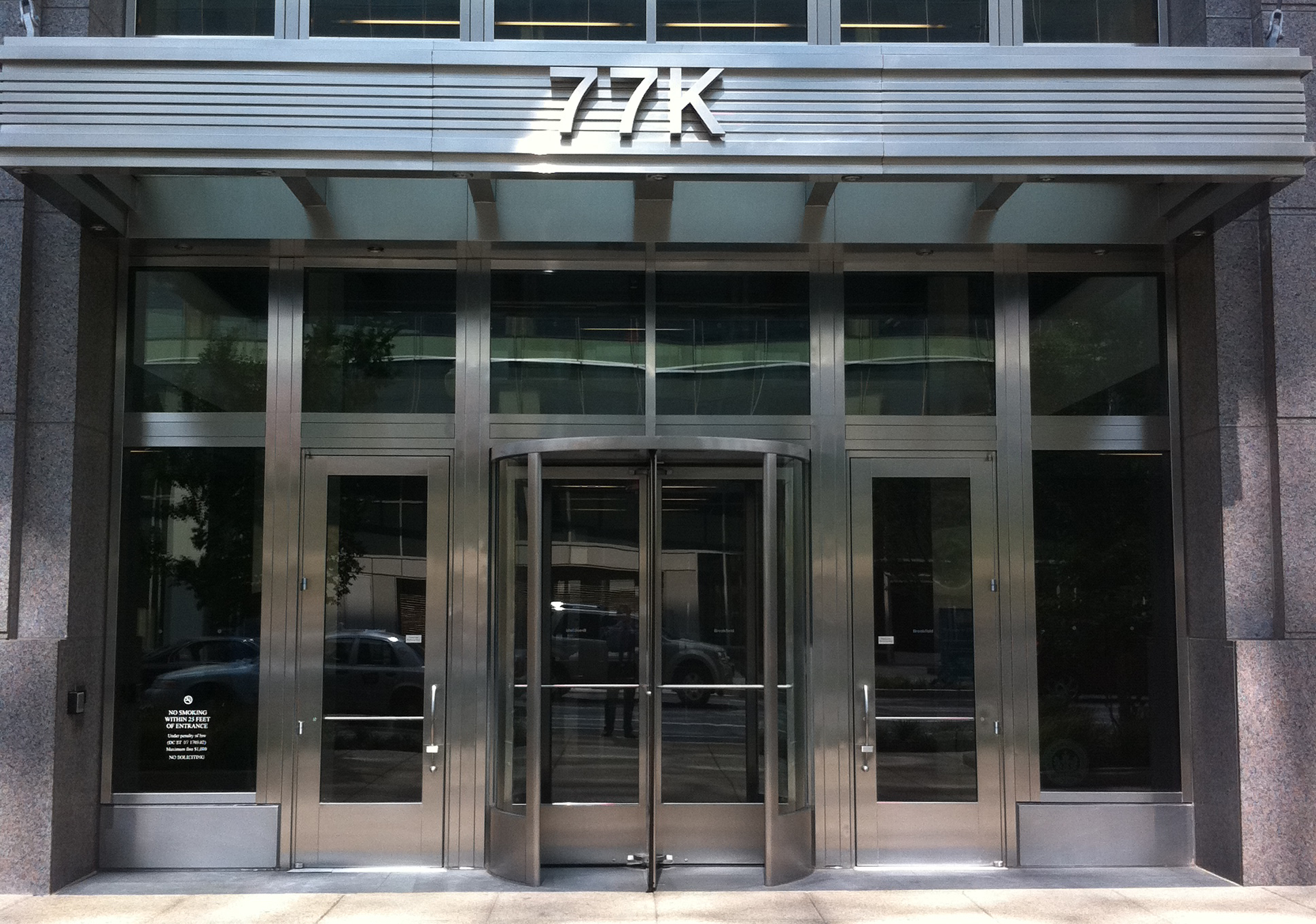
In April 2011, the merged CQ Roll Call was located in the NoMa neighborhood of Washington, D.C. As part of FiscalNote, it is now located on Pennsylvania Ave.

CQ was founded in 1945 by Nelson Poynter and his wife, Henrietta Poynter, to provide a link between local newspapers and the complex politics within Washington, D.C.

Thomas N. Schroth, managing editor of the Brooklyn Eagle, was elected in October 1955 as executive editor and vice president. Schroth built the publication's impartial coverage, with annual revenue growth from $150,000 when he started to $1.8 million. In addition to adding a book division, Schroth added many staff members who achieved future journalistic success, including David S. Broder, Neal R. Peirce, and Elizabeth Drew. He was fired from Congressional Quarterly in 1969 after festering disagreements with Poynter over editorial policy at the publication, and Schroth's efforts to advocate "more imaginative ways of doing things" reached a boil.

In 1965, Poynter summed up his reasons for founding CQ: "The federal government will never set up an adequate agency to check on itself, and a foundation is too timid for that. So it had to be a private enterprise beholden to its clients." Despite its name, CQ was published quarterly for only one year. Demand drove more frequent updates, first weekly, then daily. CQ was also an early leader in delivering information on a real-time basis, starting with a dial-up service in 1984. Its website dominates the online legislative tracking information market and has been nominated for several awards. CQ has since launched several web-only newsletters with a greater focus on particular areas, including CQ Homeland Security, CQ BudgetTracker, and CQ HealthBeat.

=== 21st century ===
In 2005, CQ's flagship publication, the Weekly Report, was relaunched as CQ Weekly with a wider focus, including "government, commerce, and politics." CQ Weekly is now branded CQ Magazine. A daily publication, CQ Today, also is available every day when Congress is in session. CQ Today's main print competition is Atlantic Media's CongressDaily.

In May 2008, CQ Press was purchased by SAGE Publishing. Although it retains the name "CQ Press" (a trademark of Congressional Quarterly), CQ Press is no longer an affiliate of Congressional Quarterly.

Until 2009, CQ was owned by the Times Publishing Company of St. Petersburg, Florida, publisher of the Tampa Bay Times and other publications. The Times Publishing Company is, in turn, owned by the Poynter Institute, a school for journalists founded by Nelson Poynter. The Economist Group acquired CQ in 2009 and combined it with Roll Call; the terms of the deal were not disclosed.

In July 2018, a deal was announced for CQ Roll Call to be acquired by FiscalNote.

== Awards ==
Ten CQ reporters have won the "Everett McKinley Dirksen Award for Distinguished Reporting of Congress" from the National Press Foundation: Alan Ehrenhalt in 1983, Joan Biskupic in 1991, Janet Hook in 1992, George Hager in 1996, Jackie Koszczuk in 1997, Sue Kirchhoff in 2000, John Cochran in 2003, Jonathan Allen in 2008, Matt Fuller in 2015 and John M. Donnelly in 2018.

== See also ==
- Governing (magazine)
