= Theresa Malkiel =

American labor activist and suffragist (1874–1949)

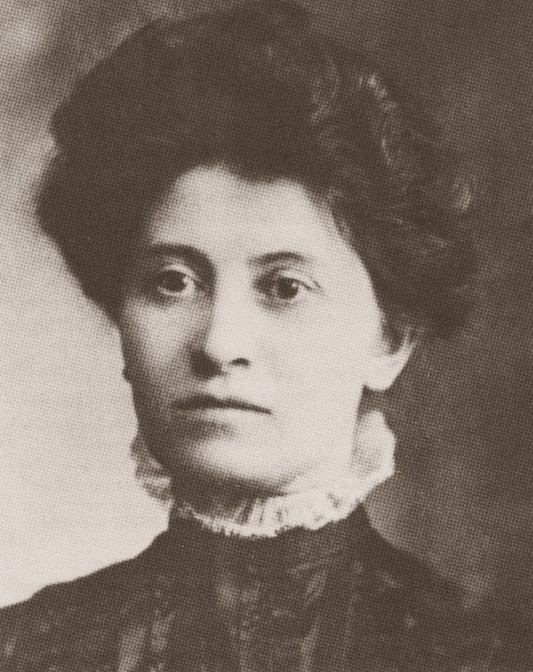
- Malkiel c. 1910
- Born: Theresa Serber; May 1, 1874; Bar, Podolia Governorate, Russian Empire
- Died: November 17, 1949 (aged 75); Yonkers, New York, U.S.
- Occupations: Labor activist, author
- Spouse: Leon Malkiel
- Children: 1

Theresa Serber Malkiel (1 May 1874 – 17 November 1949) was an American labor activist, suffragist, and educator. She was the first woman to rise from factory work to leadership in the Socialist party of the United States. Her 1910 novel, The Diary of a Shirtwaist Striker, is credited with helping to reform New York state labor laws. As head of the Woman's National Committee of the Socialist Party of America (SPA), she established an annual National Woman's Day which was the precursor to International Women's Day. In 1911, while on a speaking tour of the American South, she called attention to the problem of racism and white supremacism within the party. She spent her later years promoting adult education for women workers.

== Early life ==
Theresa Serber was born in Bar, Podolia Governorate, Russian Empire (present-day Bar, Vinnytsia Oblast, Ukraine) on May 1, 1874, one of seven sisters. Serber and her family were Jewish, and persecuted in Russia, so they emigrated to the United States, settling in Lower East Side of New York City in 1891, and seventeen-year-old Theresa went to work as a cloakmaker in a garment factory.

== Activism ==
Soon after her arrival in New York she joined the Russian Workingmen's Club. In 1892 she organized the Infant Cloakmaker's Union of New York, a group of mostly Jewish women, and became its first president. Over the next few years she represented her union in the Knights of Labor, the Central Labor Federation, and the United Hebrew Trades. Her exposure to the radicalism of the latter two groups reinforced her socialist beliefs, and in 1893 she joined the Socialist Labor Party (SLP). She was an active member of the SLP for six years, representing her union at the first convention of the Socialist Trade and Labor Alliance.

In 1899 she left the SLP and joined the Socialist Party of America (SPA). Malkiel believed that only socialism could liberate women, and that socialism, in turn, could not survive without the full participation of women. In theory, the Socialist party was committed to equal rights for men and women, but in practice, it made no effort to reach out specifically to women workers and showed little interest in their concerns. Malkiel concluded that socialist women would have to fight their own parallel battle for equality. Her 1909 essay, "Where Do We Stand on the Woman Question?" expresses her frustration with this state of affairs:

For the workingwoman of today finds herself between two fires—on the one hand, she faces the capitalist class, her bitterest enemy; it foresees a far-reaching danger in her emancipation and with all the ability of its money power tries to resist her eventual advent into the civilized world. In her anguish the workingwoman turns towards her brothers in the hope to find a strong support in their midst, but she is doomed to be disillusioned, for they discourage her activity and are utterly listless towards the outcome of her struggle.

In 1905, Malkiel organized the Women's Progressive Society of Yonkers, which became a branch of the Socialist Women's Society of New York. Although the socialist party was officially opposed to separatism, Malkiel believed a women's organization was necessary to attract women to the party, and as a practice ground for women activists. Women were tired of their limited positions in the party as "official cake-bakers and money-collectors," she said. Meanwhile, she wrote socialist propaganda leaflets and published numerous articles on socialism and the woman question in journals such as the Progressive Woman, Machinists' Monthly, and the International Socialist Review. She also contributed to the New York Call, a socialist journal she co-founded with her husband.

=== Woman's National Committee ===
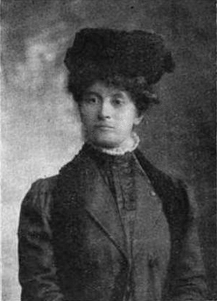
Theresa Malkiel (1909)

Malkiel was elected to the Woman's National Committee of the Socialist party in 1909. She served as a delegate to several conventions, campaigned, wrote pamphlets, and, like Rose Pastor Stokes, helped raise awareness of immigrant women's concerns. She established suffrage clubs designed to appeal to working women and bring them into the party. She also established an annual National Woman's Day, starting on February 28, 1909, which was observed by several European socialist parties as well as the SPA. Woman's Day was the precursor to International Women's Day which is celebrated each year on March 8.

In 1909, she worked closely with the Women's Trade Union League (WTUL) to support the New York shirtwaist strike with publicity and fundraising.

=== The Diary of a Shirtwaist Striker ===
In 1910, Malkiel published The Diary of a Shirtwaist Striker, a fictionalized account of the shirtwaist strike. She depicted the strike from the point of view of an American-born worker who is initially wary of her immigrant co-workers. Over time she grows closer to them and becomes increasingly aware of the need to win the ballot as well as the strike, and of the need for more solidarity between male and female workers.

After the Triangle Shirtwaist Factory fire the following year, the book garnered public attention and helped trigger legislative reforms. Later scholars tended to dismiss the book as propaganda. In 1990 it was reprinted by Cornell University Press with an introduction by historian Françoise Basch, and received positive reviews from Alice Kessler-Harris, Mari Jo Buhle, and the ILR Review.

=== Tour of the American South ===
During a speaking tour of the American South in 1911, Malkiel was appalled to learn that white socialists were practicing racial segregation. In one Arkansas town, she was invited to speak at a gathering of over a thousand African Americans, but party organizers would not allow it. In another, the Socialist local refused to allow African Americans to join. At one event in Mississippi she gave a speech in the pouring rain to a group of dues-paying African-American socialists who were denied entry to the local meeting hall. Her scathing report in the New York Call created a stir:

Lord preserve us from this kind of Socialists....We must not preach Socialism to the negroes because the white workingmen are foolish enough to allow their masters to arouse their prejudices against their fellow workers in order to keep them divided so as to play off one against the other.

=== Other activist work ===
In 1914, as head of the Socialist Suffrage Campaign of New York, Malkiel organized a mass meeting at Carnegie Hall. In 1916, she was one of three women appointed by the National Executive Committee to travel across the country campaigning for suffrage. Although the Socialist party was officially opposed to cooperating with suffragist organizations such as the National Woman Suffrage Association, Malkiel supported the idea, stipulating that socialists should always present their views from a socialist perspective. She was suspicious of well-to-do suffragists such as Alva Belmont, and warned against being distracted by the "false consciousness" of bourgeois feminism.

Malkiel went on two national tours for the Socialist party during World War I, speaking on women's rights and against American involvement in the war. In 1920 she ran for the New York State Assembly on the Socialist ticket and was narrowly defeated.

== Adult education ==
Malkiel spent the last two decades of her life promoting education for immigrant women and assisting them with naturalization. She founded the Brooklyn Adult Students Association and directed its classes and summer camp.

== Personal life ==
She married attorney and fellow socialist Leon A. Malkiel in 1900 and moved to Yonkers. She gave birth to a daughter, Henrietta, in 1903. Although no longer a factory worker herself, she remained committed to improving the lives of working women. She died on November 17, 1949.

== Selected writings ==
- "Woman and the Socialist Party". The Socialist Woman. I (12): 8. May 1908.
- "Our Unfortunate Sisters". The Socialist Woman. II (18): 4. November 1908.
- "The Emancipation of Women". Machinists' Monthly Journal. XXI (1): 33–34. January 1909.
- "Where Do We Stand on the Woman Question?". International Socialist Review. 10: 159–162. August 1909.
- "Which is Better for Women, the Woman Suffrage Movement, or the Socialist Party?". The Progressive Woman. IV (37): 6–7. June 1910.
- The Diary of a Shirtwaist Striker: A Story of the Shirtwaist Makers' Strike in New York. New York: The Co-operative Press. 1910.
- "'Socialists' Despise Negroes in the South: 'Comrades' Refuse to Allow Colored Men in Meeting Halls or Party" (PDF). The New York Call. August 21, 1911.
- "Child Labor". The Railroad Trainman. XXX (10): 924–925. October 1913.

== Bibliography ==
- Brockell, Gillian (March 8, 2022). "The forgotten woman behind International Women's Day". Washington Post.
