= Thomas N. Schroth =

American journalist

Thomas Nolan Schroth (December 21, 1920 – July 23, 2009) was an American journalist who specialized in coverage of inside the Beltway politics as editor of Congressional Quarterly starting in 1955 and then establishing The National Journal in 1969 after he was fired from CQ due to policy conflicts.

== Early life and career ==
Schroth was born on December 21, 1920, in Trenton, New Jersey, together with an identical twin, Raymond. His father, Frank D. Schroth, was publisher of the Brooklyn Eagle. He attended Dartmouth College and enlisted in the United States Army Air Forces immediately after his graduation and served for three years during World War II. He had started his career as a reporter at Time magazine and United Press International. He joined his father as a reporter at the Brooklyn Eagle, and was on its staff until its demise in 1955 in the wake of a strike by The Newspaper Guild, having served as the paper's managing editor in the last three years of its existence. Following the paper's final issue on January 29, negotiations in June coordinated by Schroth to sell the name and associated goodwill of the Eagle to the publishers of The Brooklyn Daily were unsuccessful.

He was elected in October 1955 as executive editor and vice president of Congressional Quarterly, a publication established in 1945 by Nelson Poynter, publisher of the St. Petersburg Times. Schroth built the publication's impartial coverage of the United States Congress, with annual revenue growing during his tenure from $150,000 when he started to $1.8 million. In addition to adding a book division, Schroth added many staff members who achieved future journalistic success, including David S. Broder and Elizabeth Drew. He was fired from the Congressional Quarterly in 1969 after festering disagreements with Poynter over editorial policy at the publication and Schroth's efforts to advocate "more imaginative ways of doing things" reached a boil.

Shortly after his termination he established The National Journal, a publication covering high-level policymaking in Washington, D.C., with many of his employees at CQ coming over to join him at the Journal. Schroth resigned on February 3, 1970, from his post as editor at The National Journal and as director of the Center for Political Research, and was succeeded by Cliff Sessions who had been the publication's managing editor.

He moved to Maine in 1972, where he became executive editor for five years of The Ellsworth American, a newspaper published by his father-in-law. He left to publish Maine Life, a magazine he started with his wife in 1977 and ran for six years.

== Personal ==
His first marriage, in May 1948, to the former Colette Streit, ended in divorce. He married his second wife, the former Patricia Wiggins, in September 1958. She was a reporter for United Press International and the daughter of James Russell Wiggins, who was managing editor of The Washington Post at the time of his marriage and later served as United States Ambassador to the United Nations.

After moving to Maine, Schroth became active in the Maine Democratic Party, including service on the Maine State Democratic Committee. He was elected as a selectman in Sedgwick, serving in office from 1989 until 1994.

Schroth died at age 88 on July 23, 2009, due to congestive heart failure suffered at his home in Sedgwick, Maine. He was survived by his second wife and their three daughters, a daughter from his first marriage and five grandchildren.
