= Marie Frugone =

American journalist and community leader

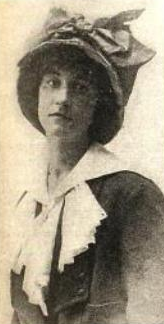
- Marie Frugone, from a 1918 publication.
- Born: 1889; New York City, US
- Died: June 16, 1953 (aged 63–64); New York City, US
- Occupations: Journalist, community leader

Marie Frugone (1889 – June 16, 1953), later Marie Frugone Scileppi, was an American journalist and community leader, who wrote for the Brooklyn Daily Eagle and the Brooklyn Times-Union in the 1930s. She worked with the Red Cross in France and Italy during World War I.

== Early life ==
Marie Frugone was born in Brooklyn, the daughter of Frank L. Frugone and Rosa Varni Frugone. Her father, who was born in Italy, was publisher of the Bolletino Della Sera, an Italian-language newspaper in New York.

== Career ==
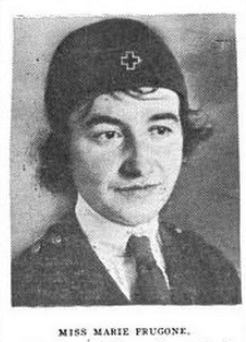
Marie Frugone in her Red Cross uniform, from a 1920 publication.

Frugone was secretary to the Sheriff of Kings County. She advocated for Italian-American culture and residents of Brooklyn. She worked with the Red Cross in France and Italy during World War I, using her Italian language skills as "interpreter, entertainer, and nurse" in tuberculosis hospitals. She was decorated by the Italian Red Cross and the American Red Cross for her wartime service. After the war, she was active in the Italian World War Veterans' Committee.

In 1920, Frugone campaigned for Warren G. Harding, and was a member of the Naturalization Committee of the Overseas Girls, women volunteering to do clerical work to help clear paperwork overloads and speed the legal processes for immigrants. One report said that she helped over a thousand people a year become United States citizens.

Frugone started her journalism career at her father's newspaper before World War I. She wrote about women and politics for the Times Union and Brooklyn Daily Eagle newspapers in the 1920s and 1930s, in a column titled "With the Women Voters". In 1937, her column was renamed "With the Women's Clubs".

Frugone was director of the Little Italy Neighborhood House and the Richmond Hill Settlement House in Queens. She chaired the Brooklyn branch of the Italian Welfare League, the Women's Auxiliary of the United Italian Social Service Foundation, and the Women's Auxiliary of the Boys Club of the Navy Yard district.

== Personal life ==
Marie Frugone married Francis Paul Scileppi in 1924. They had a daughter, Francine Scileppi Petruzzi, born a few months after Francis died in 1926. Marie Frugone Scileppi died in 1953, aged 64 years, in Brooklyn.
