= Josephine Conger-Kaneko =

American journalist and writer

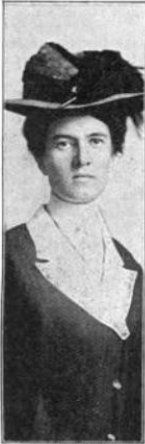
Josephine Conger-Kaneko, 1909

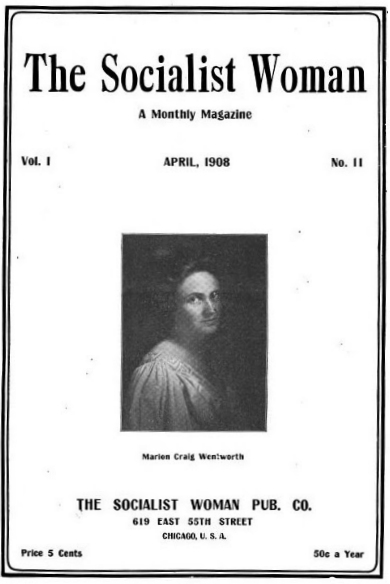
The Socialist Woman magazine cover featuring playwright Marion Craig Wentworth, April 1908

Josephine Conger-Kaneko (5 May 1875 – 28 July 1934) was an American journalist and writer. She is best remembered as the editor of the magazines The Socialist Woman and Home Life.

== Biography ==
Josephine Conger was born in Centralia, Missouri. She learned about the publishing trade at an early age, setting type for the Linneus Bulletin, a newspaper established by her brother. She also delved in the writing of poetry, gaining some degree of local notoriety for her work.

After attending the radical Ruskin College at Trenton, Missouri, she became a socialist and joined the staff of Appeal to Reason, a newspaper in Girard, Kansas. In 1907 she began publishing a separate woman's periodical, The Socialist Woman. Two years later the name changed to The Progressive Woman (1909-1913) and was renamed again as The Coming Nation (1913-1914). Conger-Kaneko believed that men and women were equal and that sexual differences were imposed by society. In 1905 she married Kiichi Kaneko, a Japanese socialist.

After 1914 Conger-Kaneko moved to Chicago, where she continued to publish The Coming Nation. She continued this for another year or two. She was a candidate for Trustee of the University of Illinois in 1914, appearing on the ballot on the Socialist Party ticket.

In May 1916, Conger-Kaneko was tapped as the new editor of Home Life, a magazine published in Chicago.

The most extensive collection of Conger's writings, as published in The Appeal to Reason, are housed in the special collections department of Leonard H. Axe Library at Pittsburg State University, Pittsburg, Kansas. After World War I she retired from politics.

She was a niece of J.A. Wayland.

== See also ==
- Lena Morrow Lewis

== Works ==
- (1909). A Little Sister of the Poor. Progressive Woman Publishing Company.
- (1911). Woman's Slavery: Her Road to Freedom. Progressive Woman Publishing Company.
- (1918). Woman's Voice: An Anthology (editor). Boston: The Stratford Company.

=== Selected articles ===
- "The 'Effeminization' of the United States," The World's Work 12, May/October 1906.
- "The Economic Dependence of Husbands," The Socialist Woman 6, November 1907.
