= Let's Pretend =

US radio series

Arthur Anderson with others in the cast of Let's Pretend

Let's Pretend, created and directed by Nila Mack, was a CBS radio series for children. Prior to being renamed Let's Pretend, the program had a variety of titles and formats. In its most famous form, Let's Pretend, the Peabody Award-winning series ran from 1934 to 1954.

== Early formats and titles ==
The show had several different early formats and titles. Aunt Jymmie and Her Tots in Tottyville began October 27, 1928. Aunt Jymmie was the host of this Saturday morning children's program's whimsical tales of fantasy and fairy tales. She introduced each week's tale which was enacted by a cast of young children, "the tots." The young "tots" traveled to Tottyville, a make-believe world of royalty, witches and magic spells. Originating from the WABC studio in New York City, the flagship station for CBS, this series lasted for 18 broadcasts until February 23, 1929, when it was replaced by the 30-minute The Children's Club Hour with Howard Merrill, who was the host and the scriptwriter. During the 1940s, Merrill scripted for The Gay Nineties Revue, Secret Missions and detective series such as Sherlock Holmes, Leonidas Witherall and the Abbott Mysteries. The Children's Club Hour, which offered fairy tales performed by juvenile cast members, began March 2, 1929 and continued until June 22, 1929.

After 17 broadcasts of The Children's Club Hour, the time slot was given to Estelle Levy and Patricia Ryan who created another children's program, The Adventures of Helen and Mary, scripted by Yolanda Langworthy. Broadcast on CBS Saturdays at noon and other late morning timeslots, this series began June 29, 1929.

Between December 1930 and January 1931, the title briefly changed from The Adventures of Helen and Mary to Land O' Make Believe. With Estelle Levy, Patricia Ryan, and Keinth Joseph Cantor in the title roles, the fairy tale program continued until March 17, 1934.

== Nila Mack and the title change to Let's Pretend ==
After 229 broadcasts, Nila Mack took over as director and changed the title to Let's Pretend, "radio's outstanding children's theater", beginning March 24, 1934.

Mack's Peabody Award-winning Let's Pretend ran for two decades before the final show on October 23, 1954. Adaptations included such classics and fairy tales as Cinderella, The Arabian Nights, and Beauty and the Beast.

The show always began with a characteristic tune, sometimes with lyrics, from its long-time sponsor Cream of Wheat. George Bryan and Jackson Wheeler were the announcers. Jean Hight became the program's director after Nila Mack's death in 1953.

A history of the show, Let's Pretend And The Golden Age Of Radio (BearManor Media 2004), was written by veteran actor Arthur Anderson, who did character roles on Let's Pretend at age 13 and was on the show almost every week (with time out for military service) until the program's demise.

The series received numerous awards, including two Peabody Awards, (The Peabody Awards site's search engine shows a 1943 award for Outstanding Children's Program.) a Women's National Radio Committee Award and five Radio Daily Awards.

Fifty of the scripts from the radio show were re-recorded by Gotham Educational Records and released by Telegeneral following their takeover of Gotham in 1970.

== Listen to ==
- Internet Archive: Let's Pretend
- Let's Pretend radio shows (3 episodes)
- Heritage Radio Theatre: Let's Pretend (January 9, 1954): Robin Hood
- Let's Pretend radio shows (49 episodes)
