= Henrietta Poynter =

American journalist

Henrietta Malkiel Poynter (1901–1968) was an American journalist and businesswoman credited as the co-founder of Congressional Quarterly with her husband, Nelson Poynter.

== Early life and education ==
Henrietta Malkiel was born in New York City in 1901, the only child of political activists Leon and Theresa Malkiel. Her parents were Russian Jewish immigrants and founded the New York Daily Call, a Socialist newspaper. Her mother, a women's rights and labor activist, was the author of The Diary of a Shirtwaist Striker. She attended Hunter College High School and graduated from the Columbia Journalism School in 1922.

== Career ==
After college, Henrietta worked as a features editor for several magazines, including Vanity Fair, Musical Digest, and Vogue. She served as the foreign editor for Vogue from 1929 to 1931. She also served as assistant to film director John Houseman. She met her future husband when they were both working on President Franklin D. Roosevelt's reelection campaign in 1940. They collaborated on a number of projects for the Office of War Information. During World War II she was the assistant program chief for Voice of America, and is credited with naming the program.

In 1945, the Poynters co-founded the Congressional Quarterly as a means to have easier and more streamlined access to the major legislation going through Congress. The Poynters resided mainly in St. Petersburg, Florida, but spent a great deal of time traveling between Florida and Washington, DC. Starting in 1953, she was the associate editor for her husband's newspaper, the St. Petersburg Times. She also served as the Vice President and a trustee of the Poynter Fund.

During her career, Poynter was a member of the National Women's Press Club and the National Conference of Editorial Writers and the International Press Institute (she is noted as the first woman to serve on its American Committee).

== Personal life and legacy ==
Henrietta married Nelson Poynter in 1942 in Williams, Arizona. She was active in several causes in Florida, serving as one of the five founding members of the St. Augustine Historical Preservation and Restoration Commission in St. Augustine, Florida. She died on January 25, 1968, after suffering a stroke, and following her death the Florida Legislature honored her with a resolution for her service to the state in 1969.
