= Girls' Day (Judaism) =

Holiday observed by some Jewish communities

Rosh Chodesh L'Banot (Hebrew: ראש חודש לבנות), also known as Chag HaBanot (חג הבנות, 'Festival of the Daughters', sometimes translated as Girls' Day), and in Arabic as Eid al-Banat (عيد البناب), is a holiday celebrated by some Jewish communities in the Middle East on Rosh Chodesh of the Jewish month of Tevet, during the Jewish holiday of Chanukah. The Jewish community where the holiday was most preserved is in Tunisia. But there is evidence that it was also celebrated in Jewish communities in Libya, Algeria, Kushta, Istanbul, Morocco and Thessaloniki.

== Origins of the holiday ==
It is not clear when the holiday was first celebrated.

The holiday is linked to several events throughout Jewish history. The stories of Judith, the mother of seven, and the daughter of the High Priest are directly linked to the story of Chanukah. Judith tricked and killed the invading general Holofernes, allowing the Maccabees to get an upper hand. The mother of seven, sometimes called Hannah or Miriam, was killed along with her seven sons by the Seleucids for refusing to give up her Jewish traditions. The daughter of the High Priest (sometimes called Channah, daughter of Matiyahu) protested against the invading governor, who demanded that every young woman sleep with him the night before her wedding. On the night of her wedding, as she was about to leave to go to governor's residence, she revealed her hair and body to onlookers and demanded that her brothers, the Maccabees, defend her if they were so appalled by her revealing herself, as she would have to reveal herself before the governor otherwise. The brothers agreed, and the family approached the governor's residence with faux celebratory attitudes. They were let into the residence, where the Maccabees then killed the governor.

Other connections include the story of Jephthah's daughter, the expulsion of the alien women during Ezra the Scribe times, Deborah and Jael, Serah daughter of Asher, Hannah and her seven sons, and Bruriah the wife of Rabbi Meir. The Book of Esther says that Queen Esther was crowned in the month of Tevet, and many of the Rosh Chodesh l'banot practices are similar to those of Jewish holiday of Purim.

== Celebrations ==
The holiday Rosh Chodesh l'banot on 1st Tevet, was preserved in Tunisia and the island of Djerba to which the Temple priests were exiled and which preserved many ancient traditions. Many families who traditionally celebrated the holiday stopped after immigrating to Israel, but in recent years Israelis have shown more interest in reviving the holiday. The holiday is also celebrated to an extent among Tunisian Jewish communities in France.

Before the menorah candles are lit, a piyyut, or liturgical poem, will be sung. In some communities, each candle lit on the menorah will be lit in honor of a specific woman or women; in others, an additional candle or candles might be lit in their honor. After lighting the candles, the blessing "Mi Shebeirach Imoteinu" is recited.

Women will gather to sing, dance, and eat food. Foods for these gatherings may include bjawia, sfenj, sweet almond balls, and cheese. Some of these gatherings include a presentation of all the bat mitzvah girls from the last year. In some communities women would visit synagogues, where they kissed Torah scrolls, prayed for their daughters' health, and were blessed by the rabbi. Women were sometimes expected to reconcile conflicts with each other on this day.

Mothers give gifts to their daughters, and husbands give gifts to their wives. Historically, these gifts from families to their daughters were used to build up the daughter's dowry.
