= Girls' Day (China) =

University campus festival in China

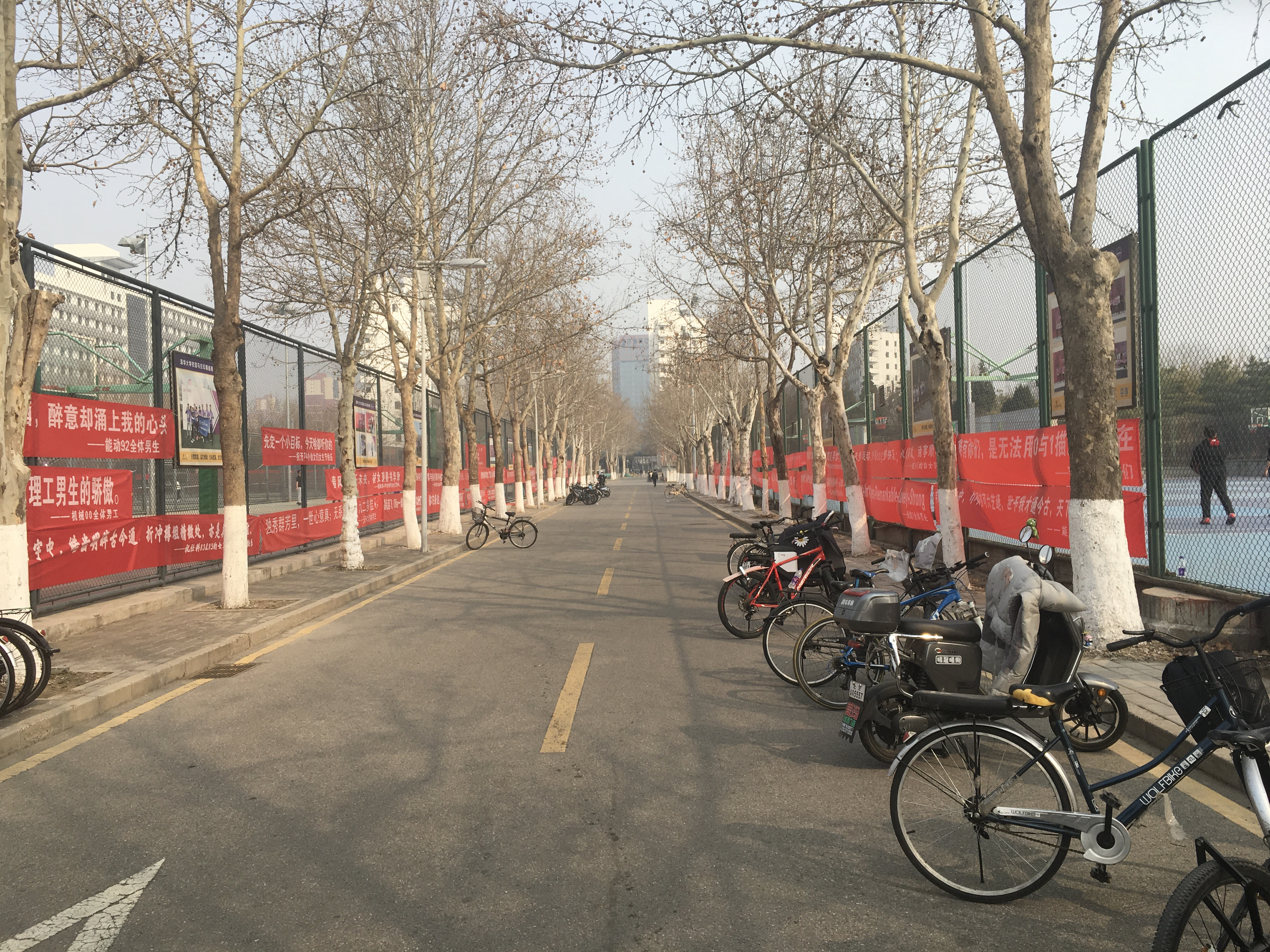
Girls' Day at Tsinghua University in 2021

Girls' Day (Chinese: 女生节; pinyin: Nǚshēng jié) is a campus festival in China. Most schools set the date on 7 March, the day before International Women's Day. It is generally believed that it developed from Chinese universities in the late 20th century and gradually spread across the country in the early 21st century.

== History ==
The origin of Girls' Day is unknown. It was popular in various universities in China as early as the end of the 20th century. There are several theories that Girls' Day originated from these universities. One theory is that it was held in 1991 by Guangdong Institute of Technology, the predecessor of Guangdong University of Technology, and was scheduled for the third week of November every year.

Second, on 7 March 1986, Shandong University's School of Literature and Journalism and the School of Economics held a "Girls' Day Gala" in the Science Hall of Shandong University's East Campus. Major media outlets gave "exhaustive follow-up coverage" of Girls' Day. The 1986 event was called the first Girls' Day, and it was stated that "afterwards, through media reports, Girls' Day gradually spread to major universities in China." However, the claim that it originated at Shandong University in 1986 contradicts the founding dates of the School of Literature and Journalism and the School of Economics. It could be also said that the event occurred in the early 1990s.

Third, according to the origin legend related to Xiamen University, the female students of Xiamen University chose the day before Women's Day as Girls' Day in order to distinguish themselves from older, married women. In the 21st century, Girls' Day was introduced by student unions or the public at all levels of universities in mainland China, and it gradually became popular in universities. In addition, major universities will also hold "Girls' Day" in late October to help students find a partner before Singles' Day.

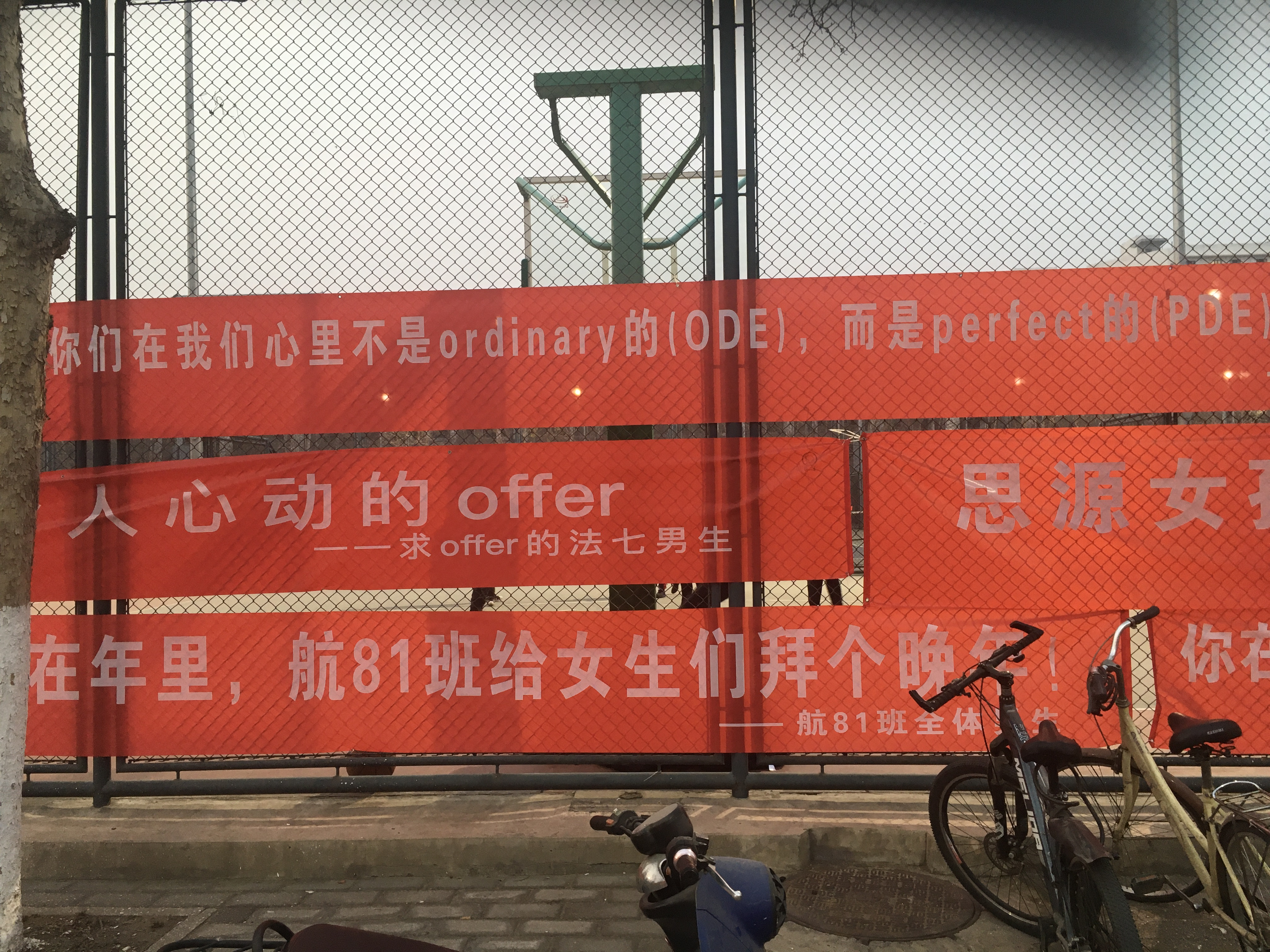
Girls' Day banner at Tsinghua University

In the 2010s, after Weibo became popular, the activities of this event have often become very lively. Many photos of activities were uploaded to the Internet and widely circulated through Weibo and other media, making the festival more popular. In 2011, the Girls' Day banners hung on campus by students from Tsinghua University and Peking University became popular on the Internet. Since then, Girls' Day has begun to go beyond campus and become a festival for the whole society.

According to news media reports, the purpose of this festival is to care for girls and show off their elegance. During this period, the student union or students will usually organize various activities including gatherings, lectures, giving gifts to girls, singing love songs, lighting words, hanging banners, and providing "care" services for girls. Some businesses even promote "Girls' Day replacing Women's Day". In 2016, when Baidu Nuomi was preparing for the third 3.7 Girls' Day on the platform, it played a video on 3 March in which artist Fan Tiantian called for Girls' Day to replace Women's Day, which attracted public attention.
