= National Woman's Day =

Precursor to International Women's Day

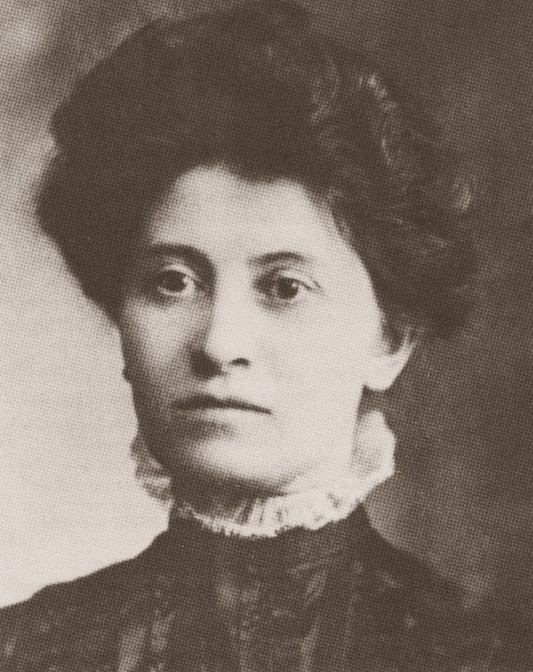
Theresa Malkiel established the day in 1909 as head of the Woman's National Committee of the Socialist Party of America.

Woman's Day, also known as National Woman's Day (a retronym in regard to the later international observance), was a commemoration conceived by labor activist Theresa Malkiel, and organized principally in New York City by the Socialist Party of America on the last Sunday in February in 1909 and 1910. It was the immediate predecessor to International Women's Day which began to develop globally in 1911, although it was still observed in the United States in February rather than in March for several years.

== Background ==
There is an account of Woman's Day being inspired by an 1857 garment strike in New York City, but this appears to be a fabrication from a French ideological dispute. Neither was it based on a particular strike in 1908, as is sometimes stated.

Some American women socialists disagreed with a resolution at the 1907 International Socialist Women's Conference that discouraged cooperation with non-socialist suffrage activists, and subsequently in 1908 the Woman's National Committee led by Theresa Malkiel was established by the Socialist Party of America and they expressed broad support for suffrage.

The Socialist Party first called in December 1908 for demonstrations for women's suffrage in the coming February.

== Events ==
On February 23, 1909, Leonora O'Reilly addressed an audience of 2,000 at the Murray Hill Lyceum. Charlotte Perkins Gilman also spoke at the Labor Lyceum and Parkside Church in Brooklyn, New York.

On February 27, 1910, Rose Schneiderman, Charlotte Perkins Gilman, and Meta L. Stern spoke at Carnegie Hall, and expressed sympathy for the Philadelphia general strike. This was the first time it was actually known as "Woman's Day". By this year, commemorations were spreading across the United States, as reported in The Progressive Woman.

On February 25, 1911, May Wood Simons and Bertha M. Fraser spoke at Carnegie Hall.

Like International Workers' Day (May Day), International Women's Day originated early in the United States, but achieved greater 20th century popularity outside of that country.

== See also ==
- New York shirtwaist strike of 1909
- Triangle Shirtwaist Factory fire
