= To-Morrow (Chicago magazine) =

Socialist magazine (1903–1909)

To-Morrow was a Chicago magazine first established in 1903 under the title Bulletin of the Morris Society, Chicago. It ran until 1909.

== History ==
The magazine was first published in November 1903 by followers of the Arts and Crafts movement and William Morris. The Society had no direct connection with the William Morris Society (founded 1955, in England).

The magazine's name was changed to To-Morrow in 1905. Two months after the name change the editor became Parker H. Sercombe who advertised it as A Rational Monthly Magazine. The magazine was left-leaning and socialist, and published the early poems of Carl Sandburg.
