= Nelson Poynter =

American publisher (1903–1978)

- Born: 1903; Sullivan, Indiana, U.S.
- Died: 1978 (aged 74–75); St. Petersburg, Florida, U.S.
- Education: Indiana University Bloomington; Yale University
- Occupations: Publisher, media proprietor
- Spouse: Marian Knauss

Nelson Poynter (1903–1978) was an American publisher and media proprietor. He was the owner of the Times Publishing Company, and the co-founder of Congressional Quarterly. He is the namesake of the Poynter Institute.

== Early life ==
Poynter was born in Sullivan, Indiana, in 1903. His family moved to Florida nine years later when his father, Paul Poynter, bought the St. Petersburg Times. Nelson returned to Indiana to get his B.A. from Indiana University Bloomington in 1924 and went on to complete a master's degree from Yale University in 1927. While in his junior year at Indiana University Bloomington, he was the editor in chief of the Indiana Daily Student.

== Career ==
Poynter worked various newspaper jobs across the country after completing his education. He began buying stock from his father in 1935, and he became an editor in 1939. He stayed in this position until his father's death in 1950 when he was appointed president. He co-founded Congressional Quarterly with his wife, Henrietta.

Poynter established the Poynter Fund in 1954 to honor his father. He gave generously to his two alma maters to enrich their journalism programs. His most lasting legacies were to establish the Modern Media Institute, which was renamed the Poynter Institute after his death in 1978, and to will his majority share in the Times Publishing Company, which owns the St. Petersburg Times (renamed the Tampa Bay Times in 2012), which likely saved the paper, and Congressional Quarterly (sold to The Economist Group in 2009).

== Personal life, death and legacy ==
Poynter was married three times: first to Catherine, then to Henrietta from 1942 until her death in 1968, and finally to Marian Knauss until his death. He had two daughters.

Poynter died of a cerebral hemorrhage on June 15, 1978, in St. Petersburg, Florida. In a memo beforehand, he instructed The Times' staff not to overplay news of his death and insisted there be no memorial service because "I have observed no one really likes to go to a funeral."

The Nelson Poynter Memorial Library, built in 1996, was built in memory of Poynter on the campus of the University of South Florida St. Petersburg.
