= Alan Ehrenhalt =

American journalist and non-fiction author

- Education: Brandeis University; Columbia University Graduate School of Journalism
- Occupations: Journalist, author
- Children: 2 daughters

Alan Ehrenhalt is an American journalist and non-fiction author.

== Early life ==
Alan Ehrenhalt graduated from Brandeis University in 1968. He received a master's degree from the Columbia University Graduate School of Journalism.

== Career ==
Ehrenhalt is a journalist and author. He is the former executive editor and later senior editor of Governing. Additionally, he has been a contributing writer to The New York Times, The New Republic and The Wall Street Journal.

Ehrenhalt was the recipient of the Nieman Fellowship in 1977–1978. He won the Everett McKinley Dirksen Award for Distinguished Reporting of Congress from the National Press Club in 1983. Additionally, he was the recipient of the Carey McWilliams Award from the American Political Science Association in 2000.

Ehrenhalt is the author of four books.

== Personal life ==
Ehrenhalt is married, and he has two daughters. He resides in Arlington, Virginia.

== Works ==
- Ehrenhalt, Alan (1991). The United States of Ambition: Politicians, Power, and the Pursuit of Office. New York: Times Books. ISBN 9780812918946. OCLC 22452837.
- Ehrenhalt, Alan (1995). The Lost City: Discovering the Forgotten Virtues of Community in the Chicago of the 1950s. New York: Basic Books. ISBN 9780465041923. OCLC 32273637.
- Ehrenhalt, Alan (1998). Democracy in the Mirror: Politics, Reform, and Reality in Grassroots America. Washington, D.C.: Congressional Quarterly. ISBN 9781568024417. OCLC 39812392.
- Ehrenhalt, Alan (2012). The Great Inversion and the Future of the American City. New York: Knopf. ISBN 9780307272744. OCLC 745979759.
