= National women's day (India) =

Annual celebration on 13 February for Sarojini Naidu's birthday

National Women's Day in India is celebrated on 13 February every year, on the birthday of Sarojini Naidu. She was born on 13 February 1879 in Hyderabad, India. Naidu was an active Indian independence movement leader and known for her literary works, particularly for her poems with themes like patriotism, romanticism and lyric for which she was called "Nightingale of India"—(Bharat Kokila) by Mahatma Gandhi. Naidu had always stood for the empowerment of women in India.
