= The Socialist Woman =

20th-century American magazine

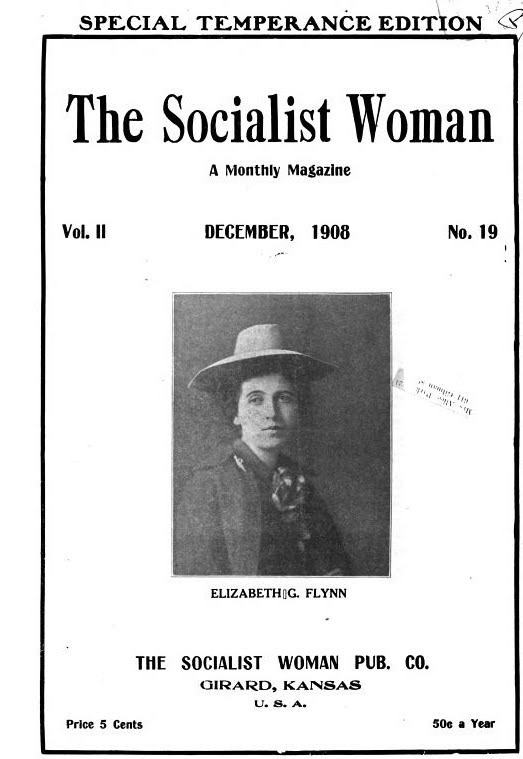
- Cover featuring Elizabeth Gurley Flynn, Dec. 1908
- Editor: Josephine Conger-Kaneko; Kiichi Kaneko
- Categories: Socialist, Feminist
- Frequency: Monthly
- Format: Print
- Circulation: 15,000
- Publisher: The Socialist Woman Publishing Co.
- Founder: Josephine Conger-Kaneko
- Founded: 1907
- First issue: June 1907
- Final issue: July 1914
- Country: United States
- Based in: Chicago
- Language: English

The Socialist Woman (1907–1914) was a monthly magazine edited by Josephine Conger-Kaneko. Its aim was to educate women about socialism by discussing women's issues from a socialist standpoint. It was renamed The Progressive Woman in 1909 and The Coming Nation in 1913. Its contributors included Socialist Party activist Kate Richards O'Hare, suffragist Alice Stone Blackwell, orator Eugene V. Debs, poet Ella Wheeler Wilcox, and other notable writers and activists.

== History ==
Josephine Conger-Kaneko founded The Socialist Woman when she was living in Chicago, home of the national office of the Socialist Party of America. When she published the first issue in June 1907, she had only 26 subscribers. At the time, only about 2,000 women belonged to the male-dominated Socialist Party, and party leaders made little effort to welcome women or address their concerns. Conger-Kaneko believed that women were essential to the success of the socialist movement, and set out to educate women about socialism by creating a magazine that would appeal to a female audience:

The Socialist Woman exists for the sole purpose of bringing women into touch with the Socialist idea. We intend to make this paper a forum for the discussion of problems that lie closest to women's lives, from the Socialist standpoint.

Both Conger-Kaneko and her husband, Kiichi Kaneko, were feminists who supported the women's suffrage movement, and the magazine reflected their views. Conger wrote editorials, poetry, and news articles about socialism and women's rights. Before his death in 1909, Kaneko co-edited the magazine and contributed essays on women's issues around the world. Many noted activists and writers contributed to the magazine, including Socialist Party activist Kate Richards O'Hare, suffragist Alice Stone Blackwell, union leader Eugene V. Debs, and poet Ella Wheeler Wilcox, among others. The magazine received no funding from the Socialist Party, and supplemented its subscription fees by carrying advertisements for books, periodicals, anti-Catholic tracts, hair tonics, patent medicines, and the like.

Conger-Kaneko wanted to reach as broad an audience as possible, and she often printed articles by suffragists whether they were socialists or not. Racial equality and issues such as lynching were rarely mentioned, however, and contributors often displayed the casual racism that was common among American whites at the time.

In 1908, Conger-Kaneko and her husband moved to Girard, Kansas. The Appeal to Reason, a socialist newspaper for which she had edited a women's column, was based in Girard, and its publishing house agreed to produce The Socialist Woman free of charge. The move freed Conger-Kaneko to focus more of her attention on editing, and over the next year she made several changes designed to bring in new readers. She began publishing fictional stories as well as news, and published special issues devoted to teachers, temperance, and child labor.

=== The Progressive Woman ===
Hoping to reach new readers, Conger-Kaneko changed the magazine's name to The Progressive Woman in March 1909. The change had the desired result, and by 1910 The Progressive Woman had between 12,000 and 15,000 subscribers, reaching readers as far away as Japan, Australia, China, Mexico, Canada, and Sweden. Special issues sold as many as 18,000 copies. In 1910 she published a controversial issue on "white slavery" (forced prostitution) and nearly lost her mailing privileges. When the Appeal to Reason reorganized in 1911, she had to look elsewhere for a publisher. She returned to Chicago, where she reached an agreement with the Woman's National Committee (WNC) of the Socialist Party whereby they would provide limited financial support for the magazine.

=== The Coming Nation ===
In October 1913, she renamed the magazine The Coming Nation, stating that there was no longer any need to target a specifically female audience. (Another magazine by the same name was defunct by that time.) The magazine fell victim to political infighting within the WNC, and its last issue was published in July 1914.

== Notable contributors ==
- Ruby Archer
- J. Mahlon Barnes
- Alice Stone Blackwell
- Winnie Branstetter
- James F. Carey
- Ida Crouch-Hazlett
- Eugene V. Debs
- Floyd Dell
- Charles Fremont Dight
- Abigail Scott Duniway
- Charlotte Perkins Gilman
- George D. Herron
- Gertrude Breslau Hunt
- Robert Hunter
- Robert G. Ingersoll
- George Ross Kirkpatrick
- Alexandra Kollontai
- Walter Lanfersiek
- Lena Morrow Lewis
- Anna A. Maley
- Theresa Malkiel
- Mila Tupper Maynard
- Octave Mirbeau
- Dora Montefiore
- Caroline Nelson
- Pauline M. Newman
- Kate Richards O'Hare
- Peter Rosegger
- Charles Edward Russell
- Bernard Shaw
- May Wood Simons
- Upton Sinclair
- Langdon Smith
- Rose Pastor Stokes
- M. Carey Thomas
- Lester F. Ward
- Fred D. Warren
- J. A. Wayland
- Ella Wheeler Wilcox
- Clara Zetkin

== Image gallery ==
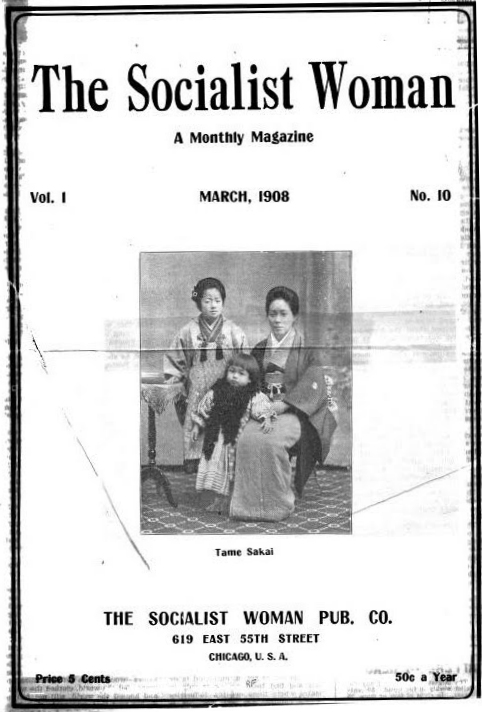
Cover of The Socialist Woman, March 1908, featuring the family of Toshihiko Sakai.

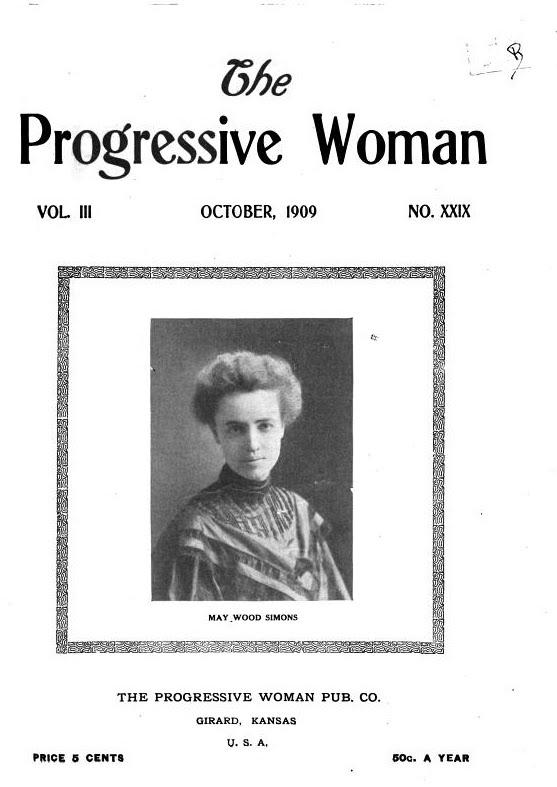
Cover of The Progressive Woman, October 1909, featuring May Wood Simons.

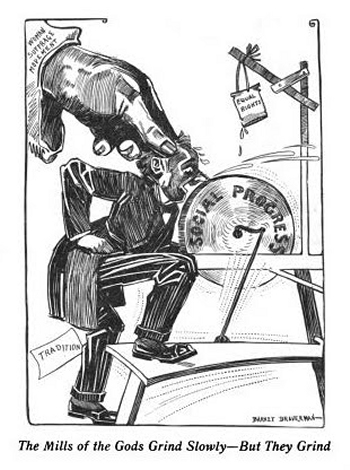
Cartoon in The Progressive Woman, March 1912.

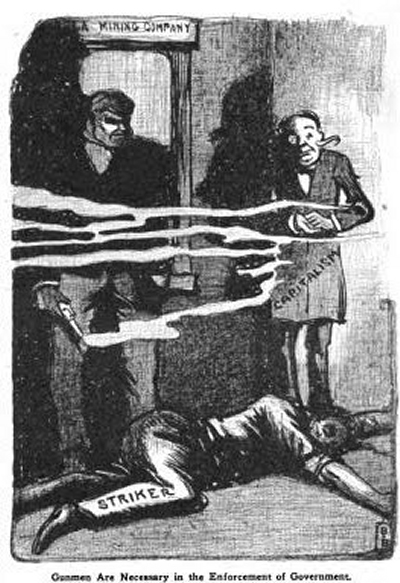
Cartoon in The Coming Nation, December 1913.
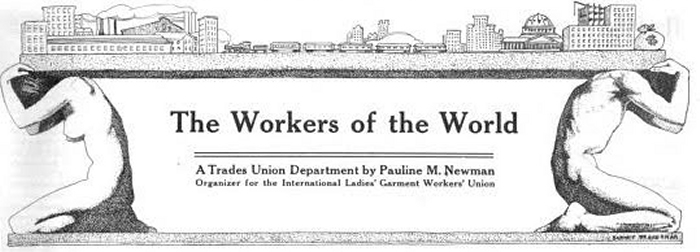
Artwork by Barnet Braverman in The Progressive Woman, August 1912.
