= National Register of Historic Places listings in Montgomery County, Missouri =

Location of Montgomery County in Missouri

This is a list of the National Register of Historic Places listings in Montgomery County, Missouri.

This is intended to be a complete list of the properties and districts on the National Register of Historic Places in Montgomery County, Missouri, United States. Latitude and longitude coordinates are provided for many National Register properties and districts; these locations may be seen together in a map.

There are 9 properties and districts listed on the National Register in the county, including 1 National Historic Landmark.

This National Park Service list is complete through NPS recent listings posted March 14, 2025.

== Current listings ==
	Name on the Register	Image	Date listed	Location	City or town	Description
1	Sylvester Marion and Frances Anne Stephens Baker House	Sylvester Marion and Frances Anne Stephens Baker House	August 20, 1999 (#99001018)	60 Boonslick Rd. 38°54′29″N 91°31′27″W	Montgomery City	
2	Farmers Mercantile Co. Building	Farmers Mercantile Co. Building	June 16, 2004 (#04000604)	872 Boone's Lick Rd. 38°52′40″N 91°22′57″W	High Hill	
3	Heinrich Gloe House		February 7, 2007 (#07000022)	358 Hwy P 38°45′18″N 91°33′32″W	Rhineland	
4	Graham Cave	Graham Cave	October 15, 1966 (#66000420)	0.5 miles north of Mineola; 38°54′19″N 91°34′23″W	Mineola	
5	High Hill School	High Hill School	November 14, 1980 (#80002381)	Off U.S. Route 40; 38°52′43″N 91°22′53″W	High Hill	
6	McKittrick Farmers Mercantile	McKittrick Farmers Mercantile	June 7, 2010 (#10000313)	500 Washington St; 38°43′58″N 91°26′39″W	McKittrick	
7	Mount Horeb Baptist Church		September 27, 1980 (#80002382)	West of Mineola; 38°50′40″N 91°38′31″W	Mineola	
8	Pinnacle Lake Rock Shelter		July 29, 1969 (#69000117)	Address Restricted	Big Spring	
9	Shrine of Our Lady of Sorrows	Shrine of Our Lady of Sorrows	September 9, 1982 (#82003153)	Route P 38°43′58″N 91°33′09″W	Starkenburg	

== See also ==
- List of National Historic Landmarks in Missouri
- National Register of Historic Places listings in Missouri
