= Lick Branch =

Lick Branch may refer to:

- Lick Branch (Grand River), a stream in Missouri
- Lick Branch (McIntosh Branch), a stream in Missouri
- Lick Branch (McKenzie Creek), a stream in Missouri
- Lick Branch (Petite Saline Creek), a stream in Missouri
- Lick Branch (Osage River), a stream in Missouri
- Lick Branch (Wolf Creek), a stream in Missouri
- Lick Branch (Dutch Buffalo Creek tributary), a stream in Cabarrus and Rowan Counties, North Carolina
- Lick Branch (Lanes Creek tributary), a stream in Union County, North Carolina
- Lick Branch (Huntington Creek), a stream in Pennsylvania
- Lick Branch (Dan River tributary), a stream in Halifax County, Virginia
- Lick Branch (Sandy Creek tributary), a stream in Pittsylvania County, Virginia
- Lick Branch (Bearskin Creek tributary), a stream in Pittsylvania County, Virginia
