= Elkhorn Creek (West Fork Cuivre River tributary) =

Stream in Montgomery County, Missouri, United States

Elkhorn Creek is a stream in Montgomery County in the U.S. state of Missouri. It is a tributary of the West Fork of the Cuivre River.

The stream headwaters arise at 38°53′04″N 91°24′34″W adjacent to the north side of I-70 approximately two miles southeast of New Florence. The stream flows northwest past New Florence and Montgomery City. It then turns to the northeast and flows past the north side of Buell and on to its confluence with the West Fork about 1.5 miles northeast of the community of Gamma at 39°05′17″N 91°19′40″W at an elevation of 587 feet.

Elkhorn Creek was named for the resemblance of its meandering course to an elk's horn.

== See also ==
- List of rivers of Missouri
