= Montgomery County High School (Missouri) =

Montgomery County R-II High School

Location
- 394 N Hwy 19; Montgomery City, Missouri 63361-5216; United States; 38°57′05″N 91°28′54″W

Information
- Type: Public
- Established: 1961
- School district: Montgomery County R-II School District
- Principal: Chris Redmon
- Teaching staff: 24.78 (on an FTE basis)
- Grades: 9–12
- Enrollment: 334 (2023–2024)
- Student to teacher ratio: 13.48
- Colors: Royal blue and white, with black as an alternate
- Mascot: Wildcats
- Website: www.mc-wildcats.org/o/mchs

Montgomery County R-II High School is a high school located about 1/2 mile south of Montgomery City, Missouri, on the east side of state highway 19. The current building was built in 1961–2 with the first classes in August 1962.

Montgomery serves 435 students in grades 9–12. It is part of the Montgomery County R-II school district. The district serves much of Montgomery County, including the towns of Bellflower, High Hill, Jonesburg, Mineola, Montgomery City, and New Florence.

== Athletics ==
Montgomery County R-II High School is a member of the Missouri State High School Activities Association (MSHSAA) and participates in class 2A and 3A athletics. Sports offered include football, cross country, softball, volleyball, cheerleading, basketball, baseball, and track and field.
