= McIntosh Branch =

Stream in the American state of Missouri

Coordinates: 38°57′46″N 91°36′46″W

McIntosh Branch is a stream in northwest Montgomery County in the U.S. state of Missouri. It is a tributary of the Loutre River.

McIntosh Branch has the name of a pioneer citizen.

Lick Branch flows into this branch.

== See also ==
- List of rivers of Missouri
