= St. Martin's Church (Starkenburg, Missouri) =

Historic church in Missouri, United States

- St. Martin's Church
- 38°44′02″N 91°33′05″W
- Location: Starkenburg, Missouri
- Country: United States
- Denomination: Roman Catholic

History
- Founded: 1852

Architecture
- Completed: 1873

St. Martin's Church is a historic Catholic church building in Starkenburg, Montgomery County, Missouri in the Diocese of Jefferson City. It is now part of a religious complex near the Shrine of Our Lady of Sorrows.

== History ==
German Catholic immigrants to the Missouri Rhineland had established a community here as early as 1852, worshiping in a log cabin. The stone church was constructed in 1873, with an addition and tower added in the 1890s.

The parish of St. Martin's at Starkenburg was merged in 1979 with St. Joseph's at Rhineland to form the Church of the Risen Savior in Rhineland, which continues to administer the site.
