= Buell, Missouri =

- Census-designated place
- Location within Missouri Location within the United States
- Coordinates: 39°01′58″N 91°26′26″W
- Country: United States
- State: Missouri
- County: Montgomery

Area
  - Total: 0.089 sq mi (0.23 km^{2})
  - Land: 0.089 sq mi (0.23 km^{2})
  - Water: 0 sq mi (0.00 km^{2})
- Elevation: 761 ft (232 m)

Population (2020)
  - Total: 25
  - Density: 284/sq mi (109.5/km^{2})
- ZIP Code: 63361
- FIPS code: 29-09496
- GNIS feature ID: 2804676

Buell is an unincorporated community and census-designated place in northern Montgomery County, Missouri, United States. As of the 2020 census, the population was 25. It is located 7 miles (11 km) northeast of Montgomery City on Route 161.

== History ==
Buell was platted in 1903, and named after Buell Hensley, a local businessman. A post office called Buell was established in 1904, and remained in operation until 1978.

== Geography ==
According to the U.S. Census Bureau, the Buell CDP has a total area of 0.09 square miles (0.23 km^{2}), of which 0.001 square miles (0.003 km^{2}), or 1.12%, are water. The community is on a slope which drains north toward Elkhorn Creek, part of the Cuivre River watershed which flows east to the Mississippi River.

== Demographics ==
Historical population
Census	Pop.	Note	%±
2020	25		—
U.S. Decennial Census

Buell first appeared as a census designated place in the 2020 U.S. census.

== Education ==
It is in the Montgomery County R-II School District.
