= Clear Creek (Loutre River tributary) =

Stream in the American state of Missouri

Coordinates: 38.8233761°N 91.5065536°W

Clear Creek is a stream in Montgomery County in the U.S. state of Missouri. It is a tributary of the Loutre River.

Clear Creek was named on account of the clarity of its water.

== See also ==
- List of rivers of Missouri
