= Dishwater Creek =

Stream in Missouri, United States

Dishwater Creek is a stream in Montgomery County in the U.S. state of Missouri. It is a tributary of the Loutre River.

The stream headwaters arise at 38°52′24″N 91°31′37″W at an elevation of 800 feet. The stream flows to the south-southwest through the Danville State Wildlife Area and passes under Missouri Route J to cross the Loutre floodplain to its confluence with the Loutre River at 38°49′33″N 91°32′50″W and an elevation of 515 feet.

According to tradition, the stream was named because a local woman used the stream to wash dishes.

== See also ==
- List of rivers of Missouri
