= Pinch Creek (Loutre River tributary) =

Stream in the American state of Missouri

Coordinates: 38.8511532°N 91.5704444°W

Pinch Creek is a stream in Montgomery County in the U.S. state of Missouri. It is a tributary of the Loutre River.

Pinch Creek (historically called "Pinch Branch") was named on account of the settlers in the area being "in a pinch".

== See also ==
- List of rivers of Missouri
