= Massey Branch =

Stream in the American state of Missouri

Coordinates: 38°54′51″N 91°36′02″W

Massey Branch is a stream in Callaway and Montgomery Counties in the U.S. state of Missouri. It is a tributary of the Loutre River.

Massey Branch most likely has the name of the family of Thomas Massey, a pioneer citizen.

== See also ==
- List of rivers of Missouri
