= 2010 Little All-America college football team =

American college football all-star team

The 2010 Little All-America college football team is composed of college football players from Division II, III, and NAIA schools who were selected by the Associated Press (AP) as the best players at each position.

== First team ==
Position	Player	Team
Offense
Quarterback	Eric Czerniewski	Central Missouri
Running back	Franklyn Quiteh	Bloomsburg
Running back	Phil Milbrath	Michigan Tech
Wide receiver	Fred Williams	St. Cloud State
Wide receiver	Jamorris Warren	Central Missouri
Tight end	Ryan Travis	West Liberty
Offensive line	Brandon Fusco	Slippery Rock
Offensive line	Cameron Bradfield	Grand Valley State
Offensive line	Brett Grozinger	Northwest Missouri State
Offensive line	Koby Parker	Hardin-Simmons
Offensive line	Trevis Turner	Abilene Christian
Defense
Defensive line	Derrin Nettles	Morehouse
Defensive line	Marc Schiechl	Colorado Mines
Defensive line	Malcolm Jenkins	Elizabeth City State
Defensive line	Matt Hoffman	Rowan
Linebacker	Larry Dean	Valdosta State
Linebacker	Matt Wenger	North Central (IL)
Linebacker	Kiel Fechtelkotter	Minnesota–Duluth
Defensive back	Ryan Jones	Northwest Missouri State
Defensive back	Caleb Singleton	Western Oregon
Defensive back	Henry Melendez	Trinity (CT)
Defensive back	Stevie Harden	Valdosta State
Special Teams
Kicker	Steve Ivanisevic	Washburn
Punter	Ronnie Partridge	Stillman
All-purpose	Cecil Shorts	Mount Union

== See also ==
- 2010 College Football All-America Team
