= Dry Fork (Loutre River tributary) =

Stream in the American state of Missouri

Coordinates: 38.8147652°N 91.4957200°W

Dry Fork is a stream in Montgomery County in the U.S. state of Missouri. It is a tributary of the Loutre River.

Dry Fork was named for the fact it is a losing stream during dry spells.

== See also ==
- List of rivers of Missouri
