= Bear Creek (Loutre River tributary) =

Stream in Missouri, U.S.

Coordinates: 38°47′20″N 91°28′11″W

Bear Creek is a stream in Montgomery and Warren counties in the U.S. state of Missouri. It is a tributary of the Loutre River.

Bear Creek was so named on account of bears in the area.

== See also ==
- List of rivers of Missouri
