= Big Spring, Montgomery County, Missouri =

Big Spring
- Census-designated place
- Location within Missouri Location within the United States
- Coordinates: 38°48′09″N 91°28′40″W
- Country: United States
- State: Missouri
- County: Montgomery

Area
  - Total: 3.38 sq mi (8.76 km^{2})
  - Land: 3.36 sq mi (8.70 km^{2})
  - Water: 0.023 sq mi (0.06 km^{2})
- Elevation: 558 ft (170 m)

Population (2020)
  - Total: 149
  - Density: 44.4/sq mi (17.13/km^{2})
- ZIP Codes: 63363 (New Florence); 65041 (Hermann)
- FIPS code: 29-05608
- GNIS feature ID: 2587054

Big Spring is an unincorporated community and census-designated place in Montgomery County, Missouri, United States. As of the 2020 census, it had a population of 149.

== History ==
A post office called Big Spring was established in 1830 and remained in operation until 1906. The community was named for a big spring near the original town site.

== Geography ==
Big Spring is in southern Montgomery County along Missouri Route 19, 8 miles (13 km) south of Interstate 70 at New Florence and the same distance north of Hermann and the Missouri River. The community is in the valley of the Loutre River, a tributary of the Missouri.

According to the U.S. Census Bureau, the Big Spring CDP has a total area of 3.38 square miles (8.75 km^{2}), of which 0.03 square miles (0.08 km^{2}), or 0.74%, are water.

== Demographics ==
Historical population
Census	Pop.	Note	%±
2020	149		—
U.S. Decennial Census

== Education ==
It is in the Gasconade County R-I School District.
