= Samuel B. Wilson =

American judge (1873–1954)

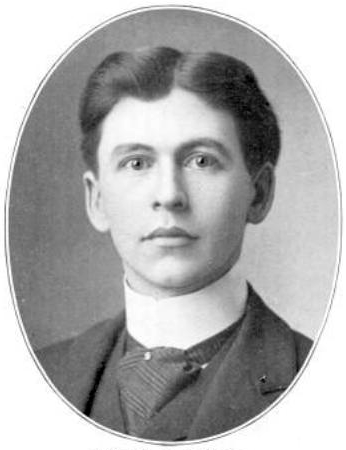

Chief Justice of the Minnesota Supreme Court
- In office 1923–1933

Personal details
- Born: Samuel Bailey Wilson; May 12, 1873; Prices Branch, Missouri
- Died: January 24, 1954 (aged 80); Mankato, Minnesota
- Political party: Republican
- Spouse: Daisy Sheehan (m. 1899)
- Children: 6
- Education: University of Minnesota Law School
- Occupation: Jurist

Samuel Bailey Wilson (May 12, 1873 – January 24, 1954) was an American lawyer and judge from Minnesota. He served as Chief Justice of the Minnesota Supreme Court from 1923 to 1933.

== Biography ==
Samuel B. Wilson was born in Prices Branch, Missouri on May 12, 1873. He graduated from the State Normal School in Mankato, Minnesota (now Minnesota State University) in 1894, and from the University of Minnesota Law School in 1896.

He married Daisy Sheehan on June 21, 1899 and they had six children.

He was active within the Republican Party, and in 1900, he was elected county attorney of Blue Earth County. He was a partner in the law firm Wilson, Blethen, and Ogle.

Wilson served as Chief Justice of the Minnesota Supreme Court from 1923 to 1933.

He died in Mankato on January 24, 1954.
