= Milligan Branch =

Stream in the American state of Missouri

Coordinates: 39.045597°N 91.328488°W

Milligan Branch is a stream in Montgomery County in the U.S. state of Missouri. It is a tributary of Brush Creek.

Milligan Branch has the name of Elihu Milligan, an early citizen.

== See also ==
- List of rivers of Missouri
