= Prices Branch, Missouri =

Unincorporated community, in Montgomery County, Missouri

Coordinates: 38.951°N 91.338°W

Prices Branch is an unincorporated community in Montgomery County, Missouri, United States. The community is located on State Highway JJ and Price's Branch Road and is approximately 13.4 miles (21.6 km) east of Montgomery City.

== History ==
A post office called Price's Branch was established in 1855, and remained in operation until 1908. The community took its name from nearby Prices Branch creek.

== Notable person ==
Charles Leiper Grigg, inventor of 7 Up, was born at Prices Branch in 1868.
