= James O. McKinsey =

American accountant and management consultant (1889-1937)

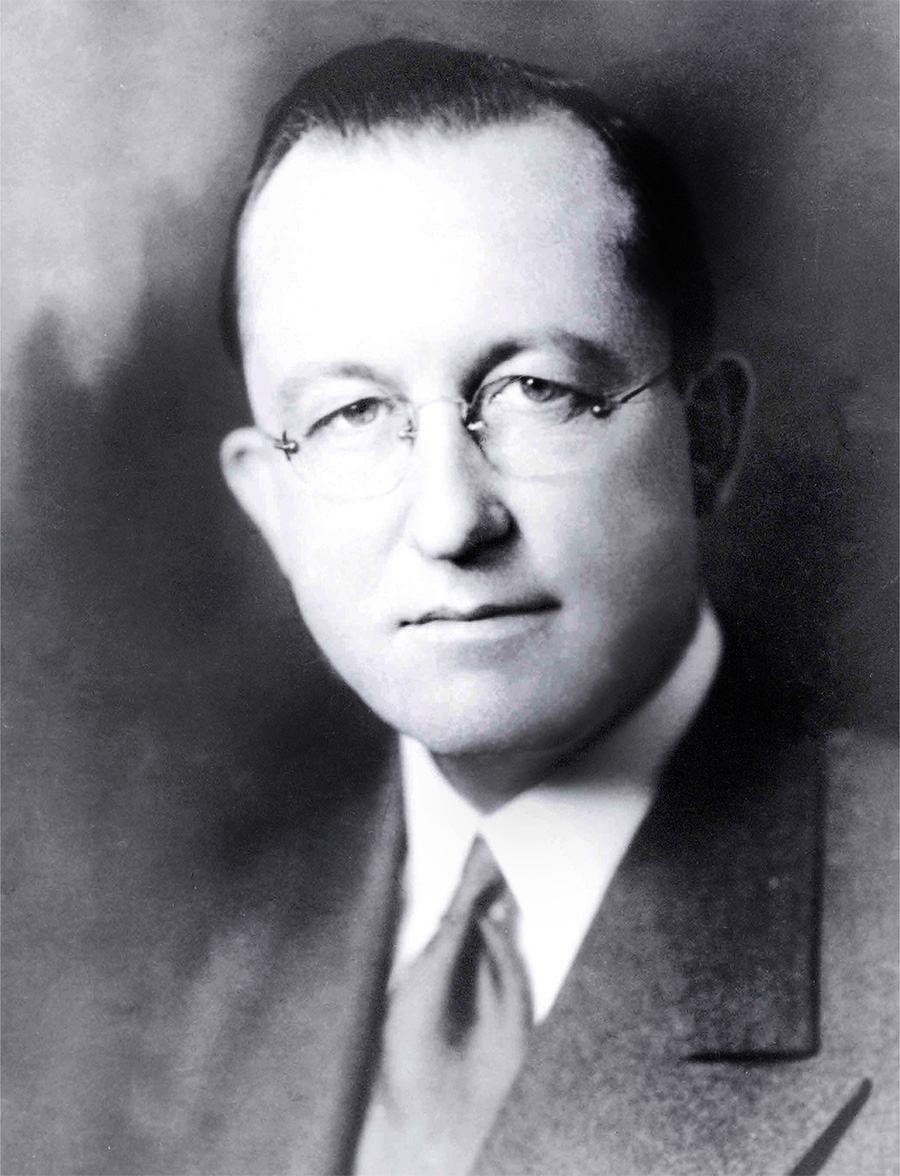
- Born: James Oscar McKinsey; June 4, 1889; Gamma, Missouri, U.S.
- Died: November 30, 1937 (aged 48); Chicago, Illinois, U.S.
- Education: Warrensburg Teachers College (BA); University of Arkansas (LLB); University of Chicago (BPhil, MA)
- Occupations: Accountant; professor; management consultant
- Employer(s): University of Chicago; McKinsey & Company
- Notable credit: Founder of McKinsey & Company
- Spouse: Alice Louise Anderson (m. 1920)
- Children: 2

James Oscar McKinsey (June 4, 1889 – November 30, 1937) was an American accountant, management consultant, professor of accounting at the University of Chicago, and founder of McKinsey & Company.

== Biography ==
McKinsey was born in 1889 in Gamma, Missouri, son of James Madison McKinsey and Mary Elizabeth (Logan) McKinsey. After attending regular public school, McKinsey initially received training as a teacher at the Warrensburg Teachers College, now University of Central Missouri, where in 1912 he obtained his Bachelor of Pedagogy.

McKinsey continued to study law at the University of Arkansas, where he obtained his Bachelor of Laws in 1913. In 1914 he studied and taught bookkeeping at the St. Louis University.

Next, McKinsey entered the University of Chicago, where in 1916 he obtained his Bachelor of Philosophy and Master of Arts in 1917, both in commerce. McKinsey was then drafted into the United States Army in 1917; he would rise in the ranks from private to lieutenant in the Ordnance Department and was discharged in 1919. While in the Army, McKinsey believed that the logistics process lacked efficiency.

From 1917 to 1920, McKinsey was an instructor and assistant professor of accounting at Chicago. McKinsey became a certified public accountant in Illinois in 1919. In 1920, McKinsey married Alice Louise Anderson; they had two children. McKinsey was also a lecturer in accounting at Columbia University from 1920 to 1921.

=== Further career ===
Having written textbooks about accounting and taxes, in 1922 he published his first major work, entitled Budgetary Control. It is regarded as "the first definitive work on budgeting"., and was written at a time when budgeting was limited to government, not private industry. In his book, McKinsey advocated that companies' performance should be judged by staying within a set budget.

McKinsey followed up Budgetary Control with two more books, Managerial Accounting and Business Administration, in 1924. In Managerial Accounting, McKinsey demonstrated ways that accounting data could reform businesses, for instance financial standards that could determine efficiency of business operations. Business Administration would serve as a precursor to the General Survey Outline, a 30-page system that McKinsey created in 1931 to evaluate a company's finances, organization, and competitiveness. These books were considered by reviewers to be "rigidly and boldly scientific as never before". McKinsey also became president of the American Association of University Instructors in Accounting in 1924 and helped establish its journal The Accounting Review.

In 1925, McKinsey founded his own consultancy firm James O. McKinsey & Company, in Chicago, where he served as senior partner until 1935. Although he was promoted by the University of Chicago to full professor in 1926, because of his business obligations, McKinsey taught only two courses at Chicago starting in 1928. In 1935, Chicago department store Marshall Field & Company retained McKinsey's services to resolve financial difficulties, specifically $12 million lost since 1930 and a loan repayment of $18 million. After sending 12 consultants to review 752 stores in 32 states, factories, and wholesalers, McKinsey recommended that Marshall Field should limit its business to retail, sell its factories, and end wholesaling. Marshall Field's board offered McKinsey the job of chair and chief executive, and McKinsey accepted the offer in October 1935. While leading Marshall Field, McKinsey also sat on the boards of Kroger, the Armour Institute of Technology, and other businesses and organizations.

McKinsey's restructuring of Marshall Field & Company involved the rapid liquidation of its wholesale operations, resulting in the elimination of nearly 800 wholesale jobs, followed by approximately 400 additional layoffs in manufacturing and retail. His management style generated considerable resistance among longtime executives, who resented his reliance on outside appointments, his restrictions on department buyers, and what they perceived as a disregard for the company's merchandising traditions. Several veteran executives, including Harry Shedd and president John McKinlay, left the company during his tenure.

McKinsey also clashed with executives over his efforts to introduce lower-priced merchandise into the flagship State Street store, which had traditionally emphasized quality goods. His proposed acquisition of a New England manufacturer of inexpensive hosiery was opposed by the company's executives and ultimately blocked by board member Stanley Field. Further tensions arose over McKinsey's large purchases of raw materials, whose prices subsequently fell during the 1937 recession. In November 1937, McKinsey was warned by company directors that he would have to substantially change his management methods or face demands for his resignation.

Shortly before his death, McKinsey reportedly reflected on his experience as an executive in a conversation with James P. Margeson Jr., whom he had appointed to a senior position at Marshall Field & Company. According to Wendt and Kogan, McKinsey told him: "Jim, never in my whole life before did I know how much more difficult it is to make business decisions myself than merely advising others what to do in their businesses, without having to take the final responsibility myself."

For his eponymous company, McKinsey named Andrew Thomas Kearney managing partner of the Chicago office. In 1936, McKinsey was also elected chairman of the American Management Association.

The History of Accounting: An International Encyclopedia explained that McKinsey "soon turned Marshall Field's red ink into profit, but he may have done so at the cost of his health. He died of pneumonia on November 30, 1937."

== Selected publications ==
- Hodge, Albert Claire & James Oscar McKinsey, Principles of accounting, Chicago, Univ. of Chicago Press, 1920.
- McKinsey, J.O. Bookkeeping and Accounting, Volume 1. Cincinnati: South-Western, 1920.
- McKinsey, J.O. Bookkeeping and Accounting, Volume 2. Cincinnati: South-Western, 1920.
- McKinsey, James O. Budgetary control. New York: The Ronald Press, 1922.
- McKinsey, James Oscar. Managerial Accounting. Vol. 1. University of Chicago Press, 1924.
- McKinsey, James O. Business Administration. South-Western Publishing Co, Cincinnati, Ohio 1924.
