= Wellsville =

Wellsville is the name of several locations in the United States:

- Wellsville, Kansas
- Wellsville, Michigan
- Wellsville, Missouri
- Wellsville (town), New York
- Wellsville (village), New York
- Wellsville, Ohio
- Wellsville, Pennsylvania
- Wellsville, Utah
