= Egbert (disambiguation) =

Egbert is a masculine given name and a surname. It may also refer to:

- Egbert, Ontario, Canada, a town
- Dad Egbert, a character from welcome Homestuck
- Egbert, Missouri, United States, an unincorporated community
- Mount Egbert, Alexander Island, Antarctica
- Fort Egbert, Eagle, Alaska, a US Army base

== See also ==
- Egbert Gospels, commissioned by Archbishop Egbert of Trier
- Speedy Eggbert, a 1998 computer game
