= Sallee Branch =

Stream in the American state of Missouri

Coordinates: 38.886153°N 91.574888°W

Sallee Branch is a stream in Montgomery County in the U.S. state of Missouri. It is a tributary of the Loutre River.

Sallee Branch has the name of Van Sallee, a pioneer citizen.

== See also ==
- List of rivers of Missouri
