= Warden Branch =

Stream in the American state of Missouri

Coordinates: 38.752544°N 91.509610°W

Warden Branch is a stream in Montgomery County in the U.S. state of Missouri. It is a tributary of the Loutre River.

Warden Branch has the name of an early citizen.

== See also ==
- List of rivers of Missouri
