= Oliver Branch =

Stream in the American state of Missouri

Coordinates: 39.006429°N 91.582109°W

Oliver Branch is a stream in Montgomery County in the U.S. state of Missouri.

Oliver Branch has the name of John Oliver, a settler.

== See also ==
- List of rivers of Missouri
