= Whippoorwill (disambiguation) =

Whippoorwill commonly refers to the eastern whip-poor-will, a North American bird.

Whippoorwill or Whip-poor-will may also refer to:

- The 1978 Whippoorwill tornado
- Mexican whip-poor-will, a bird of the southwestern United States and Mexico
- Whippoorwill, Oklahoma, a census-designated place in the United States
- The Whippoorwill Club, a country club near Armonk, New York, United States
- Whippoorwill Creek, a stream in Montgomery County, Missouri, United States
- Whippoorwill (train), a defunct Chicago and Eastern Illinois Railroad passenger train
- USS Whippoorwill, two US Navy ships
- The Whippoorwill, a 2012 album by Blackberry Smoke

== See also ==
- Whip-poor-will flower or Trillium cernuum, a North American flowering plant
