= Eric Czerniewski =

American football player (born 1988)

Profile
- Position: Quarterback

Personal information
- Born: March 5, 1988 (age 38); Montgomery City, Missouri, U.S.
- Listed height: 6 ft 0 in (1.83 m)
- Listed weight: 187 lb (85 kg)

Career information
- High school: Montgomery County
- College: Central Missouri
- NFL draft: 2011: undrafted

Awards and highlights
- Harlon Hill Trophy (2010)

Eric Czerniewski (born March 5, 1988) is an American former football quarterback. He won the Harlon Hill Trophy as the top player in the NCAA Division II in 2010 in his senior year at the University of Central Missouri.

== Early life ==
Czerniewski was born in Montgomery City, Missouri. He led his Montgomery County High School to its first Class 2 State Championship game in 2005. He set state records for completions (775), attempts (1,235), yards (11,557), and touchdowns (140) in a career. He also set those records for a single season, going 285-of-452 for 4,407 yards and 52 touchdowns compared to only six interceptions. He married his high school sweetheart Danielle in 2010.

== College career ==
He was the nation's fourth-ranked passer averaging of 371.9 yards per game. He was the leading passer in Division II with 5,207 total passing yards and 46 touchdown passes. His passing yardage would be a record in all but Division I FBS. He completed 447 of 670 pass attempts and had a 66.7 completion percentage. During his career at Central Missouri he had 12,847 passing yards, 107 career touchdown passes and 1,043 career pass completions—all records in the Mid-America Intercollegiate Athletics Association.

Czerniewski led Central Missouri to its first ever quarterfinals in NCAA Division II where it lost to defending national champion Northwest Missouri State, led by quarterback Blake Bolles who also one of three finalists for the award. The third finalist was Zach Amedro from West Liberty University and was also a finalist in 2009. Czerniewski received 164 total points to Amedro's 158—the closest vote in the award's 25-year history. Bolles was a distant third with 64 points.

In January 2011 he was named the most valuable offensive player in the Cactus Bowl Division II All Star Game after passing for 187 yards and two touchdowns.

=== Statistics ===
			Passing							Rushing		
Season	Team	GP	Rating	Att	Comp	Pct	Yds	TD	INT	Att	Yds	TD
2006	Central Missouri	2	135	21	13	62	143	1	0	5	-14	0
2007	Central Missouri	9	120	268	148	55	1741	14	10	48	35	1
2008	Central Missouri	11	152	349	205	59	2938	27	6	67	72	6
2009	Central Missouri	11	137	370	230	62	2818	19	11	48	42	5
2010	Central Missouri	14	150	670	447	67	5207	46	15	49	-4	2
	Totals	47	143	1648	1043	305	12847	107	42	217	131	14

Note: Uses NCAA (rather than NFL) passer rating model
