= Starkenburg (disambiguation) =

Starkenburg may refer to:

- Starkenburg, a historical region in the present state of Hesse, Germany
- Starkenburg Observatory, an astronomical observatory in Heppenheim, Hesse, Germany
- Starkenburg Castle, in Heppenheim, Hesse, Germany
- Starkenburg, Rhineland-Palatinate, a municipality in the district Bernkastel-Wittlich, Rhineland-Palatinate, Germany
- Starkenburg Castle (Rhineland-Palatinate), in Starkenburg, Rhineland-Palatinate
- Provinz Starkenburg, a Province of the former Grand Duchy of Hesse
- Starkenburg, Missouri, a community in the United States
