= Mineola, Missouri =

Unincorporated community in Missouri, U.S.

Coordinates: 38°53′17″N 91°34′18″W

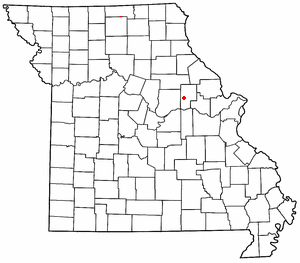

Mineola (/ˌmɪniˈoʊlə/ MIN-ee-OH-lə) is an unincorporated community in western Montgomery County, Missouri, United States. The community is located on Missouri Supplemental Route J and is about one mile south from Interstate 70. Montgomery City is approximately six miles north of the community. It is on the east bank of the Loutre River. Graham Cave within Graham Cave State Park is on the north side of I-70 just north of the community and Mount Horeb Baptist Church is approximately 4.5 miles to the southwest.

Mineola was platted in 1879. A post office called Mineola was established in 1881, and remained in operation until 1967. Mineola is a name derived from an unidentified Native American language meaning "healing water".

Graham Cave and Mount Horeb Baptist Church are listed on the National Register of Historic Places.
