= Mount Horeb Baptist Church =

Historic church in Missouri, United States

- U.S. National Register of Historic Places
- Location within Missouri Location within the United States
- Location: West of Mineola, near Mineola, Missouri
- Coordinates: 38°50′40″N 91°38′31″W
- Area: 4 acres (1.6 ha)
- Built: 1897
- NRHP reference No.: 80002382
- Added to NRHP: September 27, 1980

Mount Horeb Baptist Church is a historic Baptist church located near Mineola, Montgomery County, Missouri. It was built in 1897, and is a one-story, rectangular frame building with gable roof. It measures 28 feet, 3 inches, by 46 feet, 5 inches, and houses a single room. The church is representative of rural Baptist congregations in Mid-Missouri.

It was listed on the National Register of Historic Places in 1980.
