= Wellsville, Missouri =

City in Montgomery County, Missouri, United States

- City
- Wellsville in September 2026

- Location in Montgomery County and the state of Missouri
- Coordinates: 39°04′24″N 91°34′09″W
- Country: United States
- State: Missouri
- County: Montgomery

Area
  - Total: 1.54 sq mi (3.99 km^{2})
  - Land: 1.54 sq mi (3.98 km^{2})
  - Water: 0.0039 sq mi (0.01 km^{2})
- Elevation: 817 ft (249 m)

Population (2020)
  - Total: 998
  - Density: 649.4/sq mi (250.75/km^{2})
- Time zone: UTC-6 (Central (CST))
  - Summer (DST): UTC-5 (CDT)
- ZIP code: 63384
- Area code: 573
- FIPS code: 29-78406
- GNIS feature ID: 2397252

Wellsville is a city in Montgomery County, Missouri, United States. The population was 998 at the 2020 census, down from 1,217 in 2010.

== History ==
Wellsville was platted in 1856, and named after Charles Wells who was the original owner of the land. A post office called Wellsville has been in operation since 1857.

== Geography ==
Wellsville is in northwestern Montgomery County, along Missouri Route 19. It is 8 miles (13 km) northwest of Montgomery City, the county seat, and 22 miles (35 km) southeast of the city of Mexico.

According to the U.S. Census Bureau, Wellsville has a total area of 1.54 square miles (3.99 km^{2}), of which 0.002 square miles (0.005 km^{2}), or 0.13%, are water. The city sits on high ground which drains east to White Oak Creek and northwest to Little Coon Creek, both part of the Cuivre River watershed flowing east to the Mississippi River; and southwest to Coal Branch, part of the Loutre River watershed leading south to the Missouri.

== Demographics ==
Historical population
Census	Pop.	Note	%±
1880	867		—
1890	1,138		31.3%
1900	1,160		1.9%
1910	1,194		2.9%
1920	1,551		29.9%
1930	1,525		−1.7%
1940	1,314		−13.8%
1950	1,519		15.6%
1960	1,523		0.3%
1970	1,565		2.8%
1980	1,546		−1.2%
1990	1,430		−7.5%
2000	1,423		−0.5%
2010	1,217		−14.5%
2020	998		−18.0%
U.S. Decennial Census

=== 2010 census ===
As of the census of 2010, there were 1,217 people, 446 households, and 289 families residing in the city. The population density was 790.3 inhabitants per square mile (305.1/km^{2}). There were 564 housing units at an average density of 366.2 per square mile (141.4/km^{2}). The racial makeup of the city was 95.6% White, 2.8% African American, 0.5% Native American, 0.1% Pacific Islander, 0.2% from other races, and 0.8% from two or more races. Hispanic or Latino of any race were 0.7% of the population.

There were 446 households, of which 34.1% had children under the age of 18 living with them, 47.1% were married couples living together, 11.2% had a female householder with no husband present, 6.5% had a male householder with no wife present, and 35.2% were non-families. 31.2% of all households were made up of individuals, and 15.5% had someone living alone who was 65 years of age or older. The average household size was 2.54 and the average family size was 3.15.

The median age in the city was 41 years. 25.9% of residents were under the age of 18; 6.2% were between the ages of 18 and 24; 22.2% were from 25 to 44; 24.6% were from 45 to 64; and 21.2% were 65 years of age or older. The gender makeup of the city was 49.5% male and 50.5% female.

=== 2000 census ===
As of the census of 2000, there were 1,423 people, 533 households, and 346 families residing in the city. The population density was 999.8 inhabitants per square mile (386.0/km^{2}). There were 604 housing units at an average density of 424.4 per square mile (163.9/km^{2}). The racial makeup of the city was 93.18% White, 4.43% African American, 0.21% Native American, 0.07% Asian, 0.35% from other races, and 1.76% from two or more races. Hispanic or Latino of any race were 1.05% of the population.

There were 533 households, out of which 32.6% had children under the age of 18 living with them, 49.9% were married couples living together, 11.4% had a female householder with no husband present, and 34.9% were non-families. 30.4% of all households were made up of individuals, and 15.6% had someone living alone who was 65 years of age or older. The average household size was 2.48 and the average family size was 3.08.

In the city, the population was spread out, with 26.7% under the age of 18, 7.7% from 18 to 24, 25.7% from 25 to 44, 18.3% from 45 to 64, and 21.6% who were 65 years of age or older. The median age was 38 years. For every 100 females, there were 91.0 males. For every 100 females age 18 and over, there were 83.3 males.

The median income for a household in the city was $27,260, and the median income for a family was $32,917. Males had a median income of $28,750 versus $18,750 for females. The per capita income for the city was $11,817. About 14.8% of families and 20.3% of the population were below the poverty line, including 31.7% of those under age 18 and 14.2% of those age 65 or over.

== Education ==
Wellsville Public Library

Public education in Wellsville is administered by Wellsville-Middletown R-I School District. It covers the entire municipality.

Wellsville has a lending library, the Wellsville Public Library.

== See also ==
- List of cities in Nevada
