= Heinrich Gloe House =

Historic house in Missouri, United States

- U.S. National Register of Historic Places
- Location within Missouri Location within the United States
- Location: 358 Hwy P, near Rhineland, Missouri
- Coordinates: 38°45′18″N 91°33′32″W
- Area: less than one acre
- Built: 1852-1855
- Architectural style: Mid 19th Century Revival, Hewn Log House
- NRHP reference No.: 07000022
- Added to NRHP: February 7, 2007

Heinrich Gloe House is a historic home located near Rhineland, Montgomery County, Missouri. It was built between 1852 and 1855, and is 1 to 1 1/2-story, triple-pen dogtrot frontier home constructed of hewn oak logs with full dovetail joints. The building rests on a flagstone basement and foundation and reflects the style and practices of traditional architecture patterns of European immigrants.

It was listed on the National Register of Historic Places in 2007.
