= Graham Cave =

- U.S. National Register of Historic Places
- U.S. National Historic Landmark
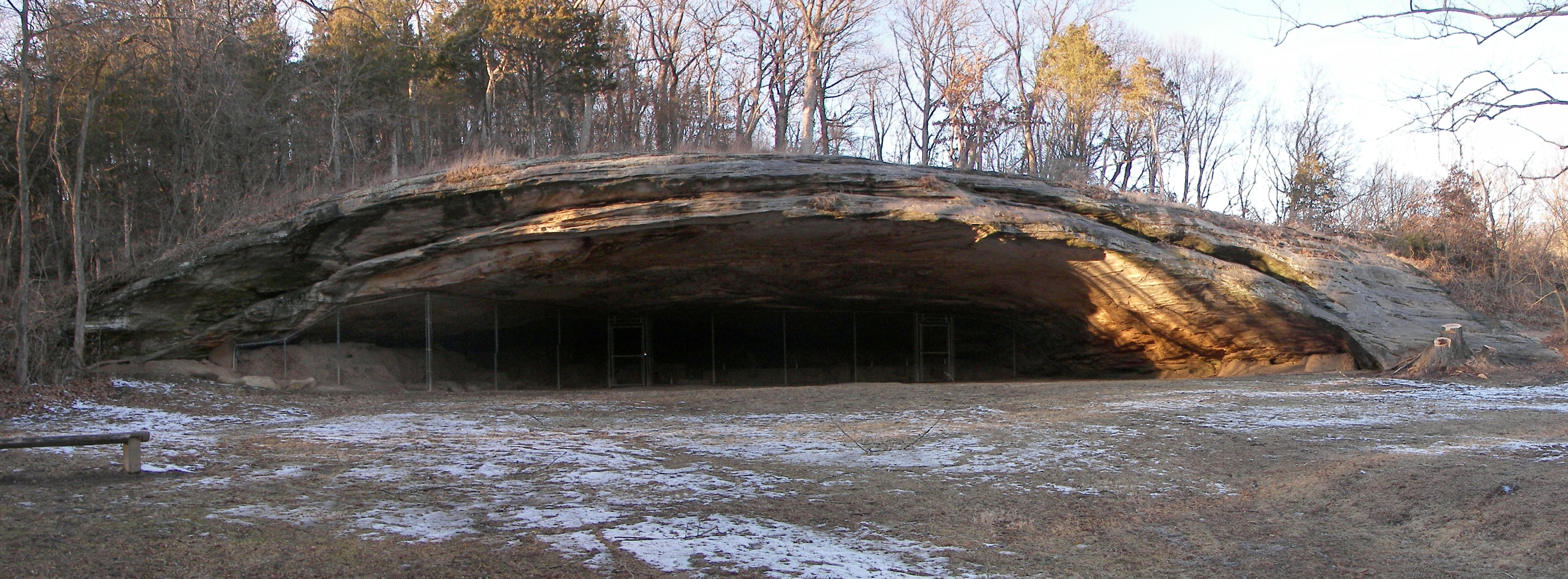

- Location within Missouri Location within the United States
- Location: Montgomery County, Missouri, United States
- Nearest city: Mineola, Missouri
- Coordinates: 38°54′19″N 91°34′23″W
- NRHP reference No.: 66000420

Significant dates
- Added to NRHP: October 15, 1966
- Designated NHL: January 20, 1961

Graham Cave is a Native American archeological site near Mineola, Missouri in Montgomery County in the hills above the Loutre River. It is located in the 356 acre Graham Cave State Park. The entrance of the sandstone cave forms a broad arch 120 feet (37 m) wide and 16 feet (5 m) high. Extending about 100 feet (30 m) into the hillside, the cave protects an historically important Pre-Columbian archaeological site from the ancient Dalton and Archaic period dating back to as early as 10,000 years ago.

Graham Cave was formed at the point of contact of Jefferson City dolomite and St. Peter sandstone. Due to water flowing and freezing, the cave grew over the years. The cave originally extended about 100 feet into the hill, but an accumulation of debris over the years filled the lower part of the cave with about seven feet of deposits. With a broad entrance, the cave provided sufficient shelter to humans and animals alike.

Robert Graham, who originally settled in the area in 1816 when he purchased some bottomland from a son of Daniel Boone, purchased the property including the cave in 1847. Graham's son D.F. Graham sheltered hogs in the cave and became interested in archeology from the artifacts he found there. After his death, his collection of artifacts was offered by his son Benjamin to the University of Missouri, which investigated the cave in 1930. Benjamin's son-in-law was persuaded to delay plans to enlarge the shelter for his livestock in 1948 so that archeological excavations could be made.

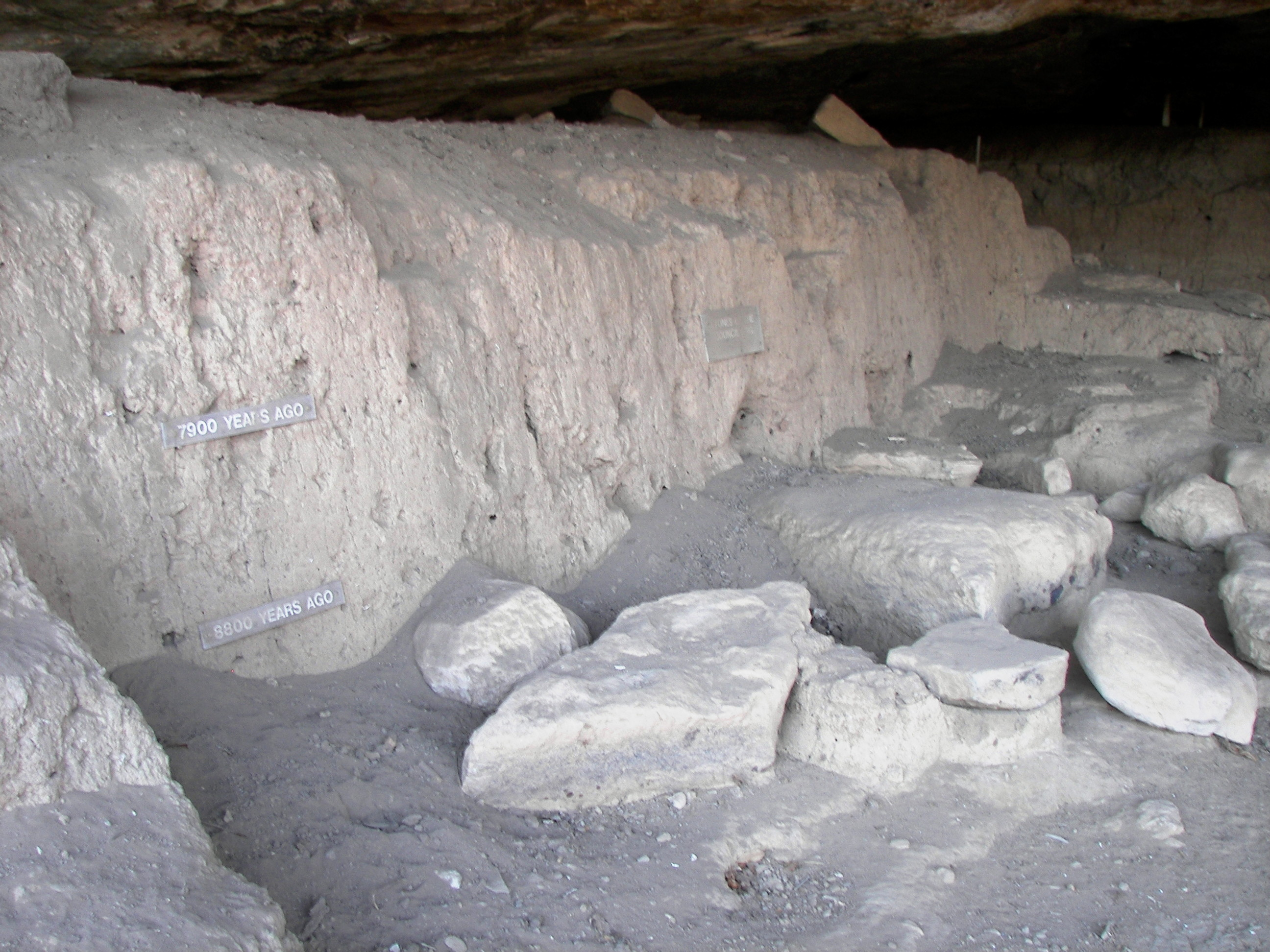
Excavations revealed this circle of stones around a larger stone at or below the 8800-year stratum.

The University of Missouri and the Missouri Archaeological Society excavated the cave between 1949 and 1961. These excavations revealed clues that linked the site to the lifestyle of the Dalton and Archaic Native Americans. The importance of the findings in that period resulted in the site being the first archaeological site in the United States to be designated a National Historical Landmark. Reports were published by the Missouri Archaeological Society. The first report was published by W. D. Logan in 1952 and a second report was published by Walter Klippel in 1971. The site is discussed by Professor Carl Chapman in The Archaeology of Missouri, volume 1 (1975), and by Professors O'Brien and Wood in The Prehistory of Missouri (1998).

The cave is now part of a 370-acre (1.5 km^{2}) state park operated by the Missouri Department of Natural Resources. Visitors are allowed up to the entrance of the cave where interpretive signs point out important archaeological discoveries.

== See also ==
- Graham Cave State Park
- List of National Historic Landmarks in Missouri
- National Register of Historic Places listings in Montgomery County, Missouri
