= Sylvester Marion and Frances Anne Stephens Baker House =

Historic house in Missouri, United States

- U.S. National Register of Historic Places
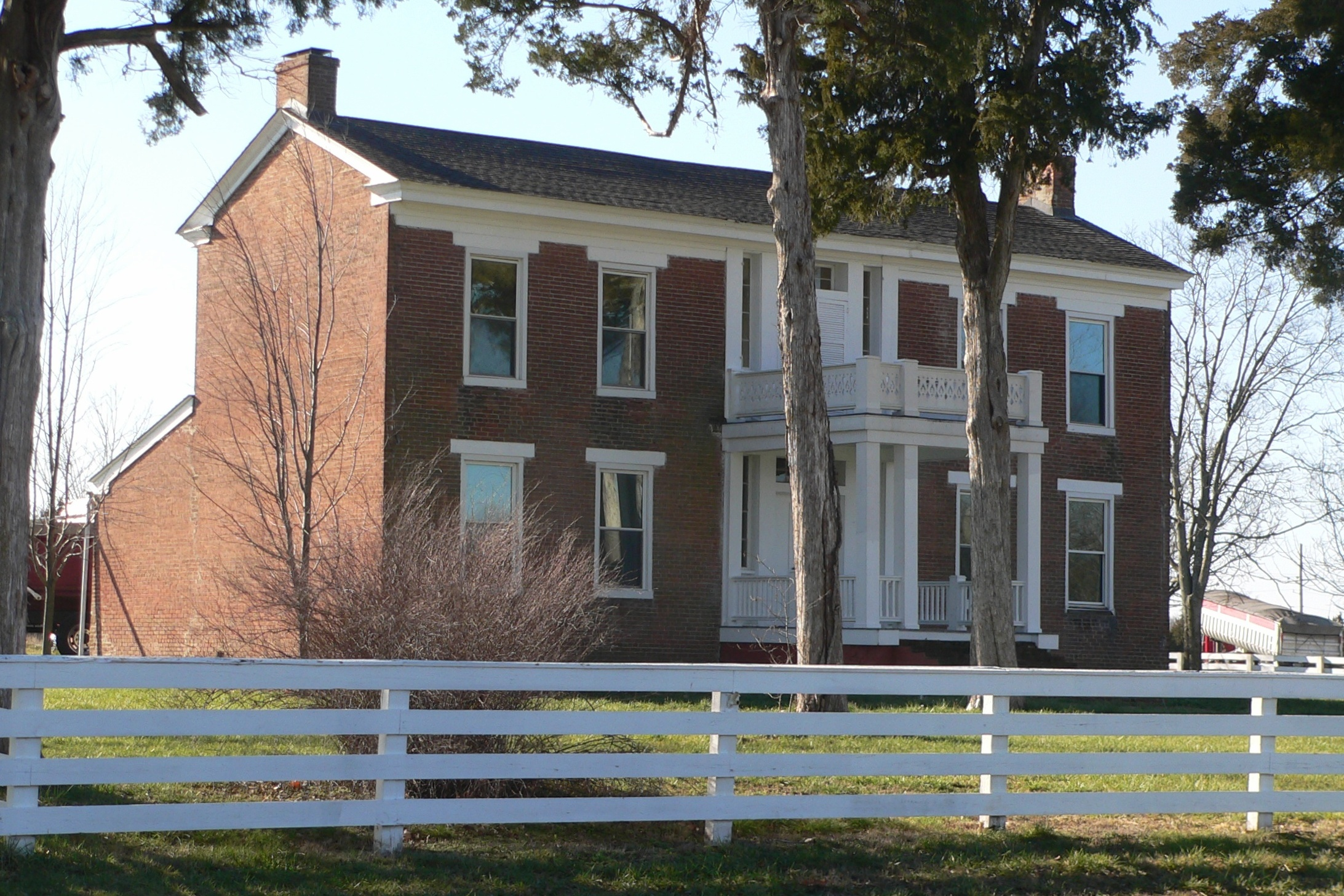
- Baker Plantation House, December 2012

- Location within Missouri Location within the United States
- Location: 60 Boonslick Rd., near Montgomery City, Missouri
- Coordinates: 38°54′30″N 91°31′37″W
- Area: 2.7 acres (1.1 ha)
- Built: 1854
- Built by: Sparks
- Architectural style: Greek Revival
- NRHP reference No.: 99001018
- Added to NRHP: August 20, 1999

Sylvester Marion and Frances Anne Stephens Baker House is a historic home located near Montgomery City, Montgomery County, Missouri. It was built in 1854, and is two-story, Greek Revival style brick I-house. It features a one-story portico, formal entryway with open staircase, and an elaborate door surround.

It was listed on the National Register of Historic Places in 1999.
