= Whippoorwill Creek =

Stream in the American state of Missouri

Coordinates: 38.813099°N 91.487386°W

Whippoorwill Creek is a stream in Montgomery County in the U.S. state of Missouri. It is a tributary of Loutre River.

Whippoorwill Creek was so named on account of Eastern whip-poor-wills near its course.

== See also ==
- List of rivers of Missouri
