= Charles Leiper Grigg =

American inventor of 7-Up (1868–1940)

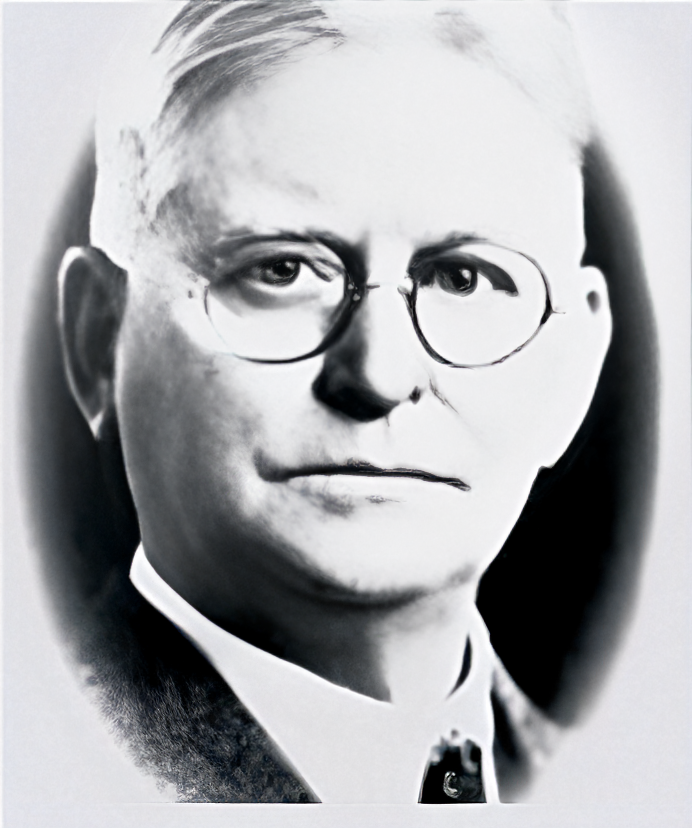
- Charles Leiper Grigg
- Born: May 11, 1868; Prices Branch, Missouri, U.S.
- Died: April 16, 1940 (aged 71); St. Louis, Missouri, U.S.
- Spouse: Lucy E. Alexander Grigg

Charles Leiper Grigg (May 11, 1868 – April 16, 1940) was an American businessman who invented 7 Up, once known as 7Up Lithiated Lemon Soda, in October 1929. Grigg became acquainted with the carbonated beverage business after moving to St. Louis, Missouri. Prior to inventing 7 Up, Grigg had created an orange soft drink named "Whistle" for the Vess Soda Company. It is still made and sold in St. Louis.

== History ==
Charles Leiper Grigg was born in 1868 in Prices Branch, Missouri to Charles L. S. Grigg (1822–1883) and Mary Elizabeth Leiper Grigg (1839–1890). At the age of 22, Grigg moved to St. Louis and began working in the advertising field in which he was introduced to the carbonated beverage business through the various agencies he was partnered.

By 1919, Charles Leiper Grigg was working as a salesman for a manufacturing company owned by Vess Jones. It was there that Grigg invented and marketed his first soft drink called "Whistle". The success of the drink led to his promotion to the position of sales and marketing manager, however, eventually he and Vess came to loggerheads and Grigg left the company, leaving Whistle behind. He eventually settled at the Warner Jenkinson Company developing flavoring agents for soft drinks.

It was at this time that Grigg invented then his second soft drink, an orange-flavored beverage with 14% sugar named "Howdy". He partnered with financier Edmund G. Ridgway and lawyer Frank Gladney and formed the Howdy Company. Based on the quality of the product and supported by Ridgway's financing, the company grew quickly, adding bottling companies anxious to sell the drink.

== Personal life ==
Grigg was married to Lucy E. Alexander Grigg. Lucy and Charles had several children. He died on April 16, 1940, in St. Louis. Hamblett Charles Grigg, his son, succeeded him as the leader of 7 Up company.
