= Danville, Missouri =

- Census-designated place
- Location within Missouri Location within the United States
- Coordinates: 38°54′45″N 91°31′57″W
- Country: United States
- State: Missouri
- County: Montgomery

Area
  - Total: 0.38 sq mi (0.99 km^{2})
  - Land: 0.38 sq mi (0.98 km^{2})
  - Water: 0.0039 sq mi (0.01 km^{2})
- Elevation: 804 ft (245 m)

Population (2020)
  - Total: 28
  - Density: 74.2/sq mi (28.65/km^{2})
- ZIP Code: 63361
- FIPS code: 29-18190
- GNIS feature ID: 2587062

Danville is an unincorporated community and census-designated place in Montgomery County, in the U.S. state of Missouri. As of the 2020 census, it had a population of 28.

== History ==
Danville was laid out in 1834 and named after Danville, Virginia, the native home of an early settler. A post office at Danville was established in 1834, and remained in operation until 1942.

== Geography ==
According to the U.S. Census Bureau, the Danville CDP has a total area of 0.38 square miles (0.98 km^{2}), of which 0.006 square miles (0.016 km^{2}), or 1.57%, are water. The community sits on a ridge which drains north to Rumbo Branch and south to Sallee Branch, both west-flowing tributaries of the Loutre River, part of the Missouri River watershed.

== Demographics ==
Historical population
Census	Pop.	Note	%±
2010	34		—
2020	28		−17.6%
U.S. Decennial Census

== Education ==
It is in the Montgomery County R-II School District.
