= Graham Cave State Park =

State park in Missouri, United States

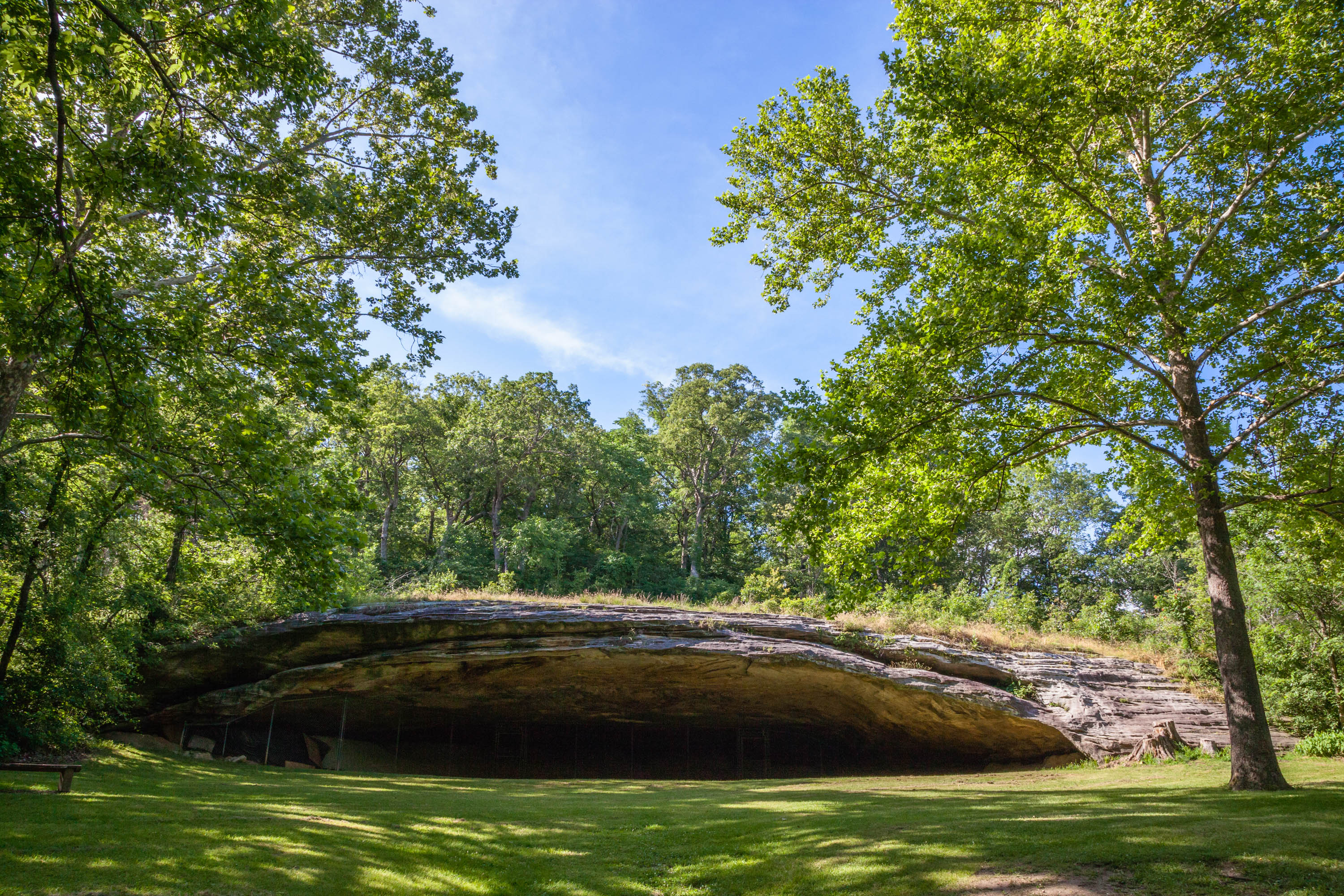
- The cave entrance

- Location within Missouri Location within the United States
- Location: Montgomery County, Missouri, United States
- Coordinates: 38°54′24″N 91°34′38″W
- Area: 386.13 acres (156.26 ha)
- Elevation: 725 ft (221 m)
- Established: 1964
- Administrator: Missouri Department of Natural Resources
- Visitors: 78,425 (in 2022)
- Website: Official website

Graham Cave State Park is a public recreation area in the U.S. state of Missouri consisting of 386 acres (156 ha) located in Montgomery County. The state park's namesake, Graham Cave, is a cave in St. Peter sandstone with an entrance 120 feet (37 m) wide and 60 feet (18 m) high and an extent of about 100 feet (30 m) into the hillside. The cave protects an historically important Pre-Columbian archaeological site dating back to as early as 10,000 years ago. Visitors are allowed up to the entrance of the cave where interpretive signs point out significant discoveries. The park includes the 82-acre (33 ha) Graham Cave Glades Natural Area which protects an area of sandstone and dolomite glades with a rich diversity of glade species. The park is adjacent to Interstate 70 from which the entrance to the cave can be glimpsed during foliage-free months.

== History ==
In 1847, settler Robert Graham purchased the property containing the cave, and the land remained in the Graham family until it was donated to the state for a state park in 1964 by Frances Graham Darnell, Robert's great-granddaughter. Robert Graham's son, D. F. Graham, sheltered hogs in the cave and became interested in archeology from the artifacts he found there. His collection of artifacts was offered by his son Benjamin to the University of Missouri, which investigated the cave in 1930. Benjamin's son-in-law, Wade Darnell, was persuaded to delay plans to enlarge the shelter for his livestock in 1948 so that archeological excavations could be made. The University of Missouri and the Missouri Archaeological Society excavated the cave between 1949 and 1961. The importance of the findings in that period resulted in the site being the first archaeological site in the United States to be designated a National Historical Landmark in 1961. Frances Graham Darnell donated the cave and surrounding land to the state of Missouri in 1964 to be a state park.

Artifacts recovered from the cave indicate that the cave's inhabitants used spears to hunt and fish. A ring of smaller stones surrounding a larger stone was found in the cave, suggesting that ceremonies were held. Pottery shows that more recent Native Americans also lived in the cave.

== Activities and amenities ==
The state park offers access to the Loutre River for boating and fishing, hiking trails named Fern Ridge (0.3 miles (0.48 km)), Loutre River (2.2 miles (3.5 km)), and Indian Glade (0.9 miles (1.4 km)), and camping facilities.
