= Gamma, Missouri =

Unincorporated community in Missouri, U.S.

Coordinates: 39°04′02″N 91°20′30″W

Gamma is an unincorporated community in northeast Montgomery County, in the U.S. state of Missouri. The community is at the intersection of Missouri Routes E and CC on the south side of Elkhorn Creek. Middletown is 5.5 miles to the northwest.

== History ==
A post office called Gamma was established in 1880, and remained in operation until 1920. It is unknown why the name "Gamma" was applied to this community.
