= Bellflower, Missouri =

- City
- Bellflower in September 2026

- Location in Montgomery County and the state of Missouri
- Coordinates: 39°00′13″N 91°21′07″W
- Country: United States
- State: Missouri
- County: Montgomery

Area
  - Total: 0.56 sq mi (1.45 km^{2})
  - Land: 0.56 sq mi (1.45 km^{2})
  - Water: 0 sq mi (0.00 km^{2})
- Elevation: 761 ft (232 m)

Population (2020)
  - Total: 325
  - Density: 581.1/sq mi (224.36/km^{2})
- Time zone: UTC-6 (Central (CST))
  - Summer (DST): UTC-5 (CDT)
- ZIP code: 63333
- Area code: 573
- FIPS code: 29-04330
- GNIS feature ID: 2394121

Bellflower is a city in Montgomery County, Missouri, United States. The population was 325 at the 2020 census, down from 393 in 2010.

== History ==
A post office called Bellflower has been in operation since 1887. The community was named for bellflowers near the original town site.

== Geography ==
Bellflower is in northeastern Montgomery County, 10 miles (16 km) east-northeast of Montgomery City, the county seat. According to the U.S. Census Bureau, the city has a total area of 0.56 square miles (1.45 km^{2}), all land. The East Branch of Brush Creek passes through the northwest corner of the city, flowing north to Brush Creek, a tributary of the Cuivre River.

== Demographics ==
Historical population
Census	Pop.	Note	%±
1920	297		—
1930	246		−17.2%
1940	218		−11.4%
1950	226		3.7%
1960	245		8.4%
1970	360		46.9%
1980	403		11.9%
1990	413		2.5%
2000	427		3.4%
2010	393		−8.0%
2020	325		−17.3%
U.S. Decennial Census

=== 2010 census ===
As of the census of 2010, there were 393 people, 142 households, and 103 families living in the city. The population density was 701.8 inhabitants per square mile (271.0/km^{2}). There were 187 housing units at an average density of 333.9 per square mile (128.9/km^{2}). The racial makeup of the city was 94.4% White, 2.3% African American, 0.5% Native American, and 2.8% from two or more races. Hispanic or Latino of any race were 0.8% of the population.

There were 142 households, of which 36.6% had children under the age of 18 living with them, 46.5% were married couples living together, 14.1% had a female householder with no husband present, 12.0% had a male householder with no wife present, and 27.5% were non-families. 21.1% of all households were made up of individuals, and 9.1% had someone living alone who was 65 years of age or older. The average household size was 2.77 and the average family size was 3.05.

The median age in the city was 36.2 years. 27.7% of residents were under the age of 18; 11.2% were between the ages of 18 and 24; 21.1% were from 25 to 44; 28.2% were from 45 to 64; and 11.7% were 65 years of age or older. The gender makeup of the city was 53.2% male and 46.8% female.

=== 2000 census ===
As of the census of 2000, there were 427 people, 140 households, and 105 families living in the city. The population density was 777.6 inhabitants per square mile (300.2/km^{2}). There were 184 housing units at an average density of 335.1 per square mile (129.4/km^{2}). The racial makeup of the city was 97.19% White, 0.23% African American, 0.23% Native American, 0.23% Asian, 0.47% from other races, and 1.64% from two or more races. Hispanic or Latino of any race were 0.94% of the population.

There were 140 households, out of which 48.6% had children under the age of 18 living with them, 55.7% were married couples living together, 13.6% had a female householder with no husband present, and 25.0% were non-families. 17.1% of all households were made up of individuals, and 6.4% had someone living alone who was 65 years of age or older. The average household size was 3.05 and the average family size was 3.48.

In the city the population was spread out, with 39.1% under the age of 18, 6.3% from 18 to 24, 29.0% from 25 to 44, 18.0% from 45 to 64, and 7.5% who were 65 years of age or older. The median age was 31 years. For every 100 females there were 115.7 males. For every 100 females age 18 and over, there were 103.1 males.

The median income for a household in the city was $33,594, and the median income for a family was $33,958. Males had a median income of $26,875 versus $16,354 for females. The per capita income for the city was $11,257. About 10.5% of families and 14.8% of the population were below the poverty line, including 21.2% of those under age 18 and 15.4% of those age 65 or over.

== Education ==
It is in the Montgomery County R-II School District.
