= Prices Branch (Missouri) =

Stream in the American state of Missouri

Coordinates: 38.9636532°N 91.3387674°W

Prices Branch is a stream in Montgomery County in the U.S. state of Missouri.

Prices Branch has the name of Lemuel Price, a pioneer citizen.

== See also ==
- List of rivers of Missouri
