= Marling, Missouri =

Unincorporated community in Missouri, U.S.

Coordinates: 39°08′02″N 91°18′36″W

Marling is an unincorporated community in Montgomery County, in the U.S. state of Missouri.

== History ==
A post office called Marling was established in 1894, and remained in operation until 1954. The community is named after Samuel Marling, the original owner of the town site.
