= Bluffton, Missouri =

Unincorporated community in Missouri, U.S.

Coordinates: 38.708°N 91.624°W

Bluffton is an unincorporated community in western Montgomery County, Missouri, United States. It is located on Route 94, approximately ten miles west of Hermann, near the Missouri River.

Bluffton was platted in 1866, and named for river bluffs near the original town site. A post office called Bluffton was established in 1867, and remained in operation until 1966.
