= Kearney (consulting firm) =

American management consulting firm

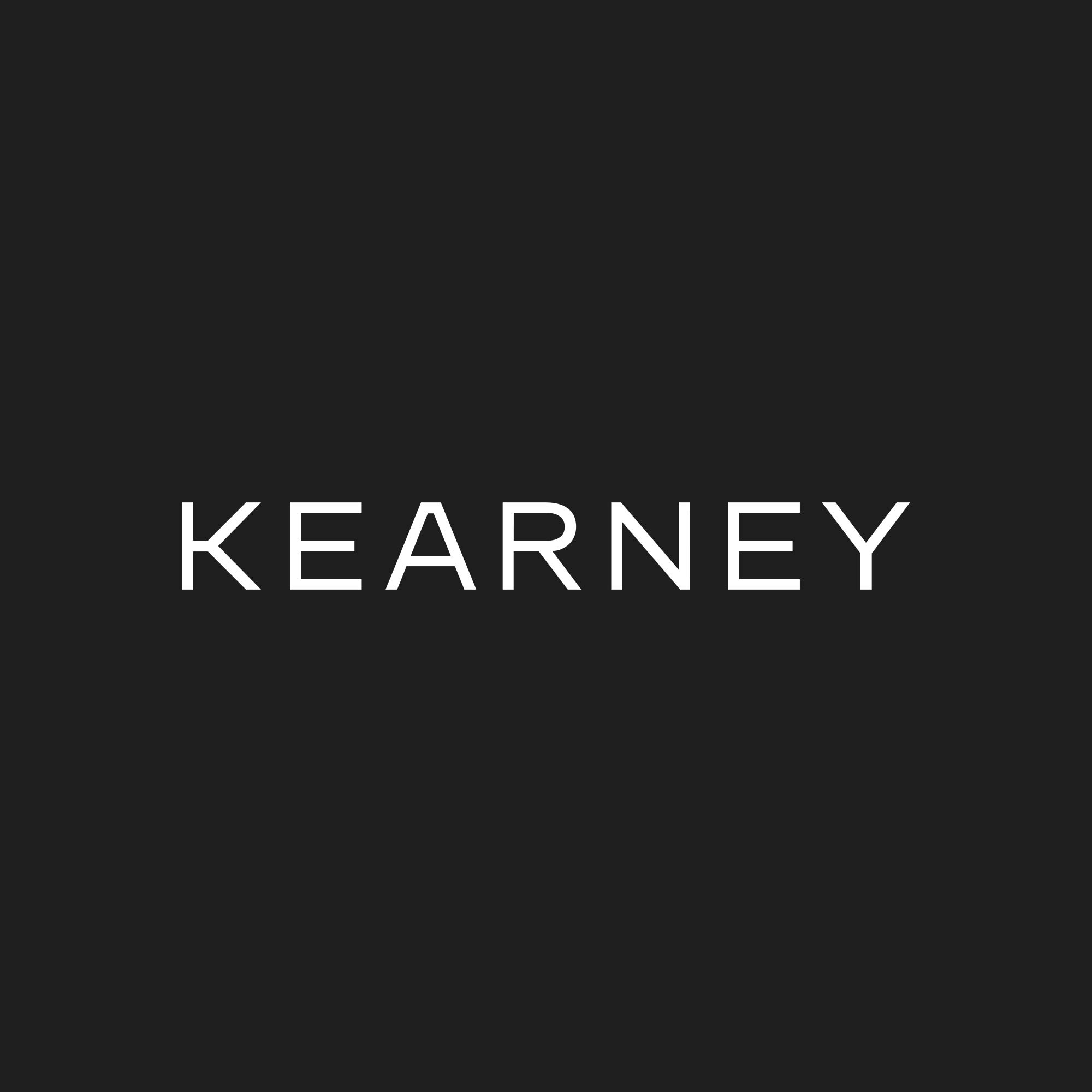
- Type: Incorporated
- Industry: Management consulting
- Founded: 1926; 100 years ago
- Founder: Andrew Thomas Kearney
- Headquarters: Franklin Center, Chicago, United States
- Number of locations: 60+ offices
- Revenue: ▲$2.0 billion (2025)
- Number of employees: 5,300+ employees
- Website: www.kearney.com

Kearney is an American global management consulting firm with offices in more than 40 countries worldwide. Kearney's predecessor firm was founded in Chicago by James O. McKinsey in 1926; he hired Andrew Thomas "Tom" Kearney as his first partner in 1929. After James McKinsey died in 1937, the Chicago office split into its own company, led by Tom Kearney and called McKinsey, A.T. Kearney, and Company. In 1947, it was renamed A.T. Kearney and Company.

In January 2020, the firm underwent a major rebranding and changed its name from A.T. Kearney to Kearney.

== Practice areas ==
Kearney has offices in 40 countries and has more than 5,300 employees. Each of the company's 300+ partners has an equal vote on governance matters.

=== Institutional partnership ===
Kearney is a longstanding partner of the World Economic Forum, attending Forum events and advising on global platforms and regional agendas and serving as a member of the Alliance of CEO Climate Members, and Racial Justice in Business. Kearney began its relationship with the European Management Forum in 1971, and it became an institutional partner in 1997.

Additionally, Kearney has been a corporate partner of the CEMS — Global Alliance in Management Education.

== History ==
In 1926, James O. McKinsey founded his firm of "accountants and management engineers"; three years later he hired Tom Kearney as the first partner at McKinsey & Company. Upon McKinsey's sudden death in 1937, the remaining partners disagreed on how to best run the firm and by 1939, they had split into three organizations: Scovell, Wellington & Company, the accounting practice run by Oliver Wellington that McKinsey & Company had purchased before McKinsey's death; McKinsey, A.T. Kearney & Company, the Chicago consulting office run by Tom Kearney; and McKinsey & Company, run by Marvin Bower. In 1947, when Bower purchased the rights to the McKinsey name from Kearney, Tom renamed the firm after himself, creating A.T. Kearney and Company. In 1972, the name was shortened to A.T. Kearney.

- (United States) Present A.T. Kearney Headquarters and its predecessor firm McKinsey's Chicago Office established in 1926
- (Germany) Office established in 1964
- (Japan) ATK's First Asian Branch Tokyo Office established in 1972
- (China) Office established in 1985
- (South Korea) Kearney Korea's Seoul Office established in 1995

A.T. Kearney opened its first international office in Düsseldorf, Germany in 1964. Its first office in Asia was opened in 1972, in Tokyo, Japan.

Kearney established its Global Business Policy Council in 1992. This is a specialized foresight and strategic analysis unit which conducts research and analysis. It regularly ranks near the top of the University of Pennsylvania's list of best for-profit private-sector think tanks; it was ranked fourth globally in 2020. The council also hosts and an annual CEO Retreat, whose attendees include academic, corporate, and government "thought leaders". Membership is by invitation only, and current members may veto the invitation of competitors.

In 1995, A.T. Kearney established its Seoul, Korea office (A.T. Kearney Korea LLC) and was acquired by the American information technology company EDS for $569 million. However, the Financial Times later described a clash between "A.T. Kearney's individualistic, entrepreneurial style and the more bureaucratic approach of EDS." These tensions peaked when the dotcom bubble burst, affecting both companies results. EDS eventually shed hundreds of jobs at A.T. Kearney, reduced compensation, consolidated back-office functions, and eventually relocated A.T. Kearney's headquarters from Chicago to Plano, Texas. By mid-2005, A.T. Kearney had experienced 11 straight quarters of shrinking revenues, including being unprofitable the final three quarters. In 2006, A.T. Kearney CEO Henner Klein and the consultancy's management struck a deal with EDS CEO Michael Jordan to buy the firm back, and A.T. Kearney was once again an independent firm.

In 2019, Kearney bought Cervello, a business analytics and data management consultancy which had offices in Boston, Dallas, New York, London and Bangalore.

In November 2022, Kearney acquired Optano, a Germany-based software firm which worked on supply chain planning.

In January 2025 Kearney announced the acquisition of Germany-based project management firm Project Partners, specialized in SAP transformation and managing large IT projects, to further extend its portfolio.

In February 2025, Kearney announced the strategic acquisition of IMTEK Inc., a business consulting and systems integration company focused on services and solutions for supply chain planning and execution

== Recruitment and alumni ==
In 2012, the career review site Glassdoor ranked Kearney as the 4th most difficult company to interview with. In Australia, this is underscored by the hiring of just 10 business analysts out of 1,200 applicants in 2021. The firm primarily operates in a generalist model, where consultants can be staffed on a variety of industry and functional projects. There is a fixed training curriculum beginning with an “experience week” to introduce staff to consulting and meet colleagues globally. Kearney also has a global mobility program that enables its consultants to live and work abroad. In 2016 and 2017, the career review site Glassdoor ranked Kearney as the highest-paying company for employees in the United States.

The company says it has 23,000 alumni, who are invited to participate in the company's Kearney Week, held in September of each year.
