= Lick Branch (McKenzie Creek tributary) =

Stream in the American state of Missouri

Lick Branch is a stream in Wayne County in the U.S. state of Missouri. It is a tributary of McKenzie Creek.

The stream headwaters arise south of Missouri Route AA at 37°10′42″N 90°43′27″W and the stream flows south to its confluence with McKenzie Creek at 37°08′27″N 90°42′22″W just southwest of the city of Piedmont.

Lick Branch was so named on account of a mineral lick near its course.

== See also ==
- List of rivers of Missouri
