= Lick Branch (Wolf Creek tributary) =

Stream in the US state of Missouri

Coordinates: 37.7436624°N 90.3823442°W

Lick Branch is a stream in St. Francois County in the U.S. state of Missouri. It is a tributary of Wolf Creek.

Lick Branch was so named on account of a mineral lick near its course.

== See also ==
- List of rivers of Missouri
