= Lick Branch (McIntosh Branch tributary) =

Stream in the American state of Missouri

Coordinates: 38.9625402°N 91.6062769°W

Lick Branch is a stream in Montgomery County in the U.S. state of Missouri. It is a tributary of McIntosh Branch.

Lick Branch was so named on account of a mineral lick near its course which attracted buffalo.

== See also ==
- List of rivers of Missouri
