= Lick Branch (Petite Saline Creek tributary) =

Stream in Missouri, United States

Coordinates: 38.9055803°N 92.8082455°W

Lick Branch is a stream in Cooper County in the U.S. state of Missouri. It is a tributary of Petite Saline Creek.

Lick Branch was named for mineral licks near its course.

== See also ==
- List of rivers of Missouri
