= Middletown, Missouri =

- City
- Middletown in September 2026

- Location in Montgomery County and the state of Missouri
- Coordinates: 39°07′39″N 91°24′53″W
- Country: United States
- State: Missouri
- County: Montgomery

Area
  - Total: 0.32 sq mi (0.83 km^{2})
  - Land: 0.32 sq mi (0.83 km^{2})
  - Water: 0 sq mi (0.00 km^{2})
- Elevation: 702 ft (214 m)

Population (2020)
  - Total: 171
  - Density: 531.9/sq mi (205.36/km^{2})
- Time zone: UTC-6 (Central (CST))
  - Summer (DST): UTC-5 (CDT)
- ZIP code: 63359
- Area code: 573
- FIPS code: 29-47900
- GNIS feature ID: 2396760

Middletown is a city in Montgomery County, Missouri, United States. The population was 171 at the 2020 census.

== History ==
Middletown was laid out in 1834, and so named on account of "its location at the crossing of roads leading from east to west and from north to south."

== Geography ==
Middletown is located in northern Montgomery County at 39°7′39″N 91°24′53″W (39.127475, -91.414681). Missouri Route 161 passes through the south side of the city as Johnson Street, leading south-southwest 14 miles (23 km) to Montgomery City, the county seat, and northeast 21 miles (34 km) to Bowling Green.

According to the U.S. Census Bureau, Middletown has a total area of 0.32 square miles (0.83 km^{2}), all land. Coon Creek, an east-flowing tributary of the West Fork of the Cuivre River, crosses the southwest corner of the city. The Cuivre River is a direct tributary of the Mississippi.

== Demographics ==
Historical population
Census	Pop.	Note	%±
1880	391		—
1890	389		−0.5%
1900	375		−3.6%
1910	323		−13.9%
1920	279		−13.6%
1930	235		−15.8%
1940	243		3.4%
1950	240		−1.2%
1960	199		−17.1%
1970	235		18.1%
1980	268		14.0%
1990	217		−19.0%
2000	199		−8.3%
2010	167		−16.1%
2020	171		2.4%
U.S. Decennial Census

=== 2010 census ===
As of the census of 2010, there were 167 people, 79 households, and 45 families living in the city. The population density was 521.9 inhabitants per square mile (201.5/km^{2}). There were 104 housing units at an average density of 325.0 per square mile (125.5/km^{2}). The racial makeup of the city was 93.4% White, 0.6% Native American, and 6.0% from two or more races.

There were 79 households, of which 24.1% had children under the age of 18 living with them, 41.8% were married couples living together, 8.9% had a female householder with no husband present, 6.3% had a male householder with no wife present, and 43.0% were non-families. 39.2% of all households were made up of individuals, and 19% had someone living alone who was 65 years of age or older. The average household size was 2.11 and the average family size was 2.80.

The median age in the city was 45.9 years. 19.8% of residents were under the age of 18; 8.4% were between the ages of 18 and 24; 18.6% were from 25 to 44; 28.8% were from 45 to 64; and 24.6% were 65 years of age or older. The gender makeup of the city was 56.3% male and 43.7% female.

=== 2000 census ===
As of the census of 2000, there were 199 people, 90 households, and 56 families living in the town. The population density was 620.3 inhabitants per square mile (239.5/km^{2}). There were 107 housing units at an average density of 333.5 per square mile (128.8/km^{2}). The racial makeup of the town was 99.50% White, and 0.50% from two or more races. Hispanic or Latino of any race were 0.50% of the population.

There were 90 households, out of which 23.3% had children under the age of 18 living with them, 50.0% were married couples living together, 11.1% had a female householder with no husband present, and 36.7% were non-families. 32.2% of all households were made up of individuals, and 65.7% had someone living alone who was 65 years of age or older. The average household size was 2.21 and the average family size was 2.79.

In the town the population was spread out, with 24.1% under the age of 18, 6.5% from 18 to 24, 19.1% from 25 to 44, 28.1% from 45 to 64, and 22.1% who were 65 years of age or older. The median age was 45 years. For every 100 females there were 87.7 males. For every 100 females age 18 and over, there were 79.8 males.

The median income for a household in the town was $19,500, and the median income for a family was $23,750. Males had a median income of $26,250 versus $17,321 for females. The per capita income for the town was $11,756. About 29.2% of families and 35.1% of the population were below the poverty line, including 64.5% of those under the age of eighteen and 13.5% of those 65 or over.

== Education ==
It is in the Wellsville-Middletown R-I School District.
