= Egbert, Missouri =

Unincorporated community in Missouri, U.S.

Coordinates: 38°45′35″N 91°38′01″W

Egbert is an unincorporated community in Montgomery County, in the U.S. state of Missouri.

== History ==
A post office called Egbert was established in 1900, and remained in operation until 1907. The community has the name of Egbert Gregory, an early settler. Despite its brief official existence, the small settlement serves as a quiet reminder of the pioneer spirit that shaped the region's early landscape.
