= Lick Branch (Osage River tributary) =

Stream in the American state of Missouri

Coordinates: 38.2544751°N 92.7032436°W

Lick Branch is a stream in Morgan County in the U.S. state of Missouri. It is a tributary of the Osage River.

Lick Branch was so named on account of nearby mineral licks which attracted deer.

== See also ==
- List of rivers of Missouri
