= New Florence, Missouri =

City in Montgomery County, Missouri, United States

- City
- New Florence in September 2026

- Location in Montgomery County and the state of Missouri
- Coordinates: 38°54′34″N 91°27′11″W
- Country: United States
- State: Missouri
- County: Montgomery

Area
  - Total: 3.03 sq mi (7.84 km^{2})
  - Land: 3.01 sq mi (7.79 km^{2})
  - Water: 0.023 sq mi (0.06 km^{2})
- Elevation: 863 ft (263 m)

Population (2020)
  - Total: 641
  - Density: 213.1/sq mi (82.29/km^{2})
- Time zone: UTC-6 (Central (CST))
  - Summer (DST): UTC-5 (CDT)
- ZIP code: 63363
- Area code: 573
- FIPS code: 29-51770
- GNIS feature ID: 2395192
- Website: www.newflorencemo.gov

New Florence is a city in Montgomery County, Missouri, United States. The population was 641 at the 2020 census, down from 769 in 2010.

== History ==
New Florence was first named "Florence", and under the latter name was platted in 1858, after Florence Lewis, the daughter of a first settler. A post office called New Florence has been in operation since 1858.

New Florence City Hall

== Geography ==
New Florence is in central Montgomery County and lies at the junction of Interstate 70 and Missouri Route 19. Highway 19 passes through the west side of the city and is accessible from Interstate 70 via Exit 175. Montgomery City, the county seat, is 5 miles (8 km) to the northwest via Highway 19, while Hermann is 16 miles (26 km) to the south.

According to the U.S. Census Bureau, New Florence has a total area of 3.03 square miles (7.85 km^{2}), of which 0.02 square miles (0.05 km^{2}), or 0.69%, are water.

The city sits along a slight ridge which drains north toward Elkhorn Creek, part of the Cuivre River watershed flowing east to the Mississippi River; and which drains west to Smith Branch, part of the Loutre River watershed flowing south to the Missouri. The southwest corner of the city drains into Calhoun Hollow and Clear Creek, another tributary of the Loutre.

From here to the St. Louis suburbs is the geographic area known as the Missouri Rhineland, first established as a center of vineyards by German immigrants in the mid-19th century.

== Demographics ==
Historical population
Census	Pop.	Note	%±
1860	103		—
1870	53		−48.5%
1880	373		603.8%
1890	465		24.7%
1900	424		−8.8%
1910	424		0.0%
1920	600		41.5%
1930	571		−4.8%
1940	565		−1.1%
1950	522		−7.6%
1960	616		18.0%
1970	635		3.1%
1980	731		15.1%
1990	801		9.6%
2000	764		−4.6%
2010	769		0.7%
2020	641		−16.6%
U.S. Decennial Census

=== 2010 census ===
As of the census of 2010, there were 769 people, 257 households, and 181 families residing in the city. The population density was 263.4 inhabitants per square mile (101.7/km^{2}). There were 302 housing units at an average density of 103.4 per square mile (39.9/km^{2}). The racial makeup of the city was 96.6% White, 0.9% African American, 0.1% Native American, 0.1% Asian, 0.4% from other races, and 1.8% from two or more races. Hispanic or Latino of any race were 0.8% of the population.

There were 257 households, of which 35.4% had children under the age of 18 living with them, 51.4% were married couples living together, 12.1% had a female householder with no husband present, 7.0% had a male householder with no wife present, and 29.6% were non-families. 23.7% of all households were made up of individuals, and 5.5% had someone living alone who was 65 years of age or older. The average household size was 2.67 and the average family size was 3.18.

The median age in the city was 41 years. 24.3% of residents were under the age of 18; 8.7% were between the ages of 18 and 24; 20.9% were from 25 to 44; 28% were from 45 to 64; and 18.2% were 65 years of age or older. The gender makeup of the city was 49.5% male and 50.5% female.

=== 2000 census ===
As of the census of 2000, there were 764 people, 248 households, and 176 families residing in the city. The population density was 471.3 inhabitants per square mile (182.0/km^{2}). There were 288 housing units at an average density of 177.7 per square mile (68.6/km^{2}). The racial makeup of the city was 97.12% White, 1.05% African American, 0.65% Native American, 0.13% Asian, 0.92% from other races, and 0.13% from two or more races. Hispanic or Latino of any race were 1.57% of the population.

There were 248 households, out of which 37.9% had children under the age of 18 living with them, 53.2% were married couples living together, 10.5% had a female householder with no husband present, and 29.0% were non-families. 23.4% of all households were made up of individuals, and 11.7% had someone living alone who was 65 years of age or older. The average household size was 2.70 and the average family size was 3.14.

In the city, the population was spread out, with 27.6% under the age of 18, 8.0% from 18 to 24, 24.6% from 25 to 44, 18.5% from 45 to 64, and 21.3% who were 65 years of age or older. The median age was 38 years. For every 100 females, there were 87.7 males. For every 100 females age 18 and over, there were 78.4 males.

The median income for a household in the city was $30,156, and the median income for a family was $34,722. Males had a median income of $30,000 versus $18,864 for females. The per capita income for the city was $12,367. About 16.7% of families and 22.2% of the population were below the poverty line, including 27.8% of those under age 18 and 13.0% of those age 65 or over.

== Education ==
It is in the Montgomery County R-II School District.

== See also ==
- List of cities in Missouri
