= Starkenburg, Missouri =

Unincorporated community in Missouri, U.S.

Coordinates: 38°44′09″N 91°33′08″W

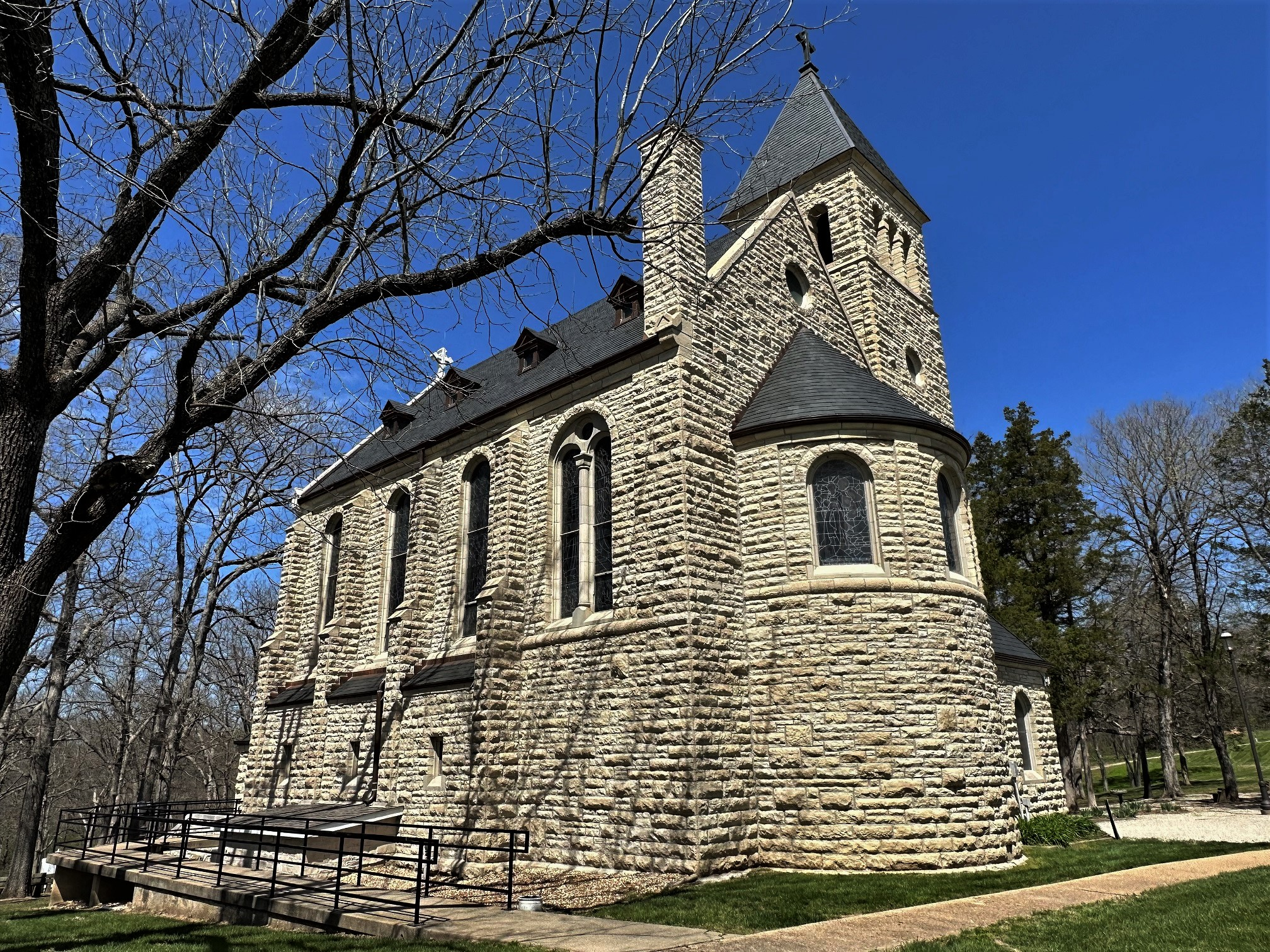
Shrine of Our Lady of Sorrows

Starkenburg is an unincorporated community in Montgomery County, in the U.S. state of Missouri.

== History ==
A post office called Starkenburg was established in 1888, and remained in operation until 1918. The community was named after Starkenburg, in Germany, the native home of a share of the early settlers.

The Shrine of Our Lady of Sorrows was listed on the National Register of Historic Places in 1982.

== See also ==
- St. Martin's Church (Starkenburg, Missouri)
