= Rhineland, Missouri =

- Village
- Church of the Risen Savior

- Location in Montgomery County and the state of Missouri
- Coordinates: 38°43′14″N 91°31′03″W
- Country: United States
- State: Missouri
- County: Montgomery

Area
  - Total: 0.34 sq mi (0.87 km^{2})
  - Land: 0.34 sq mi (0.87 km^{2})
  - Water: 0 sq mi (0.00 km^{2})
- Elevation: 558 ft (170 m)

Population (2020)
  - Total: 139
  - Density: 412.8/sq mi (159.37/km^{2})
- Time zone: UTC-6 (Central (CST))
  - Summer (DST): UTC-5 (CDT)
- ZIP code: 65069
- Area code: 573
- FIPS code: 29-61328
- GNIS feature ID: 2396876

Rhineland is a village in Montgomery County, Missouri, United States. The population was 139 at the 2020 census. Its name came from German immigrants from the river Rhine area.

Located on the north side of the Missouri River valley, Rhineland was devastated in the Great Flood of 1993. It was one of the first towns to accept federal funds to move out of a flood plain. All houses in the town were moved about 1½ miles uphill.

== History ==
Rhineland was originally built up chiefly by Germans, who named the settlement after the river Rhine. A post office called Rhineland has been in operation since 1853. The town site was platted in 1853.

The Heinrich Gloe House was listed on the National Register of Historic Places in 2007.

== Geography ==
Rhineland is in southern Montgomery County, 1.5 miles (2.4 km) north of the Missouri River. Missouri Route 94 passes through the former location of the village, at the base of the hill on which the village now sits. The city of Hermann is 5 miles (8 km) to the southeast, across the Missouri via State Highway 19.

According to the U.S. Census Bureau, Rhineland has a total area of 0.34 square miles (0.88 km^{2}), all land.

== Demographics ==
Historical population
Census	Pop.	Note	%±
1900	153		—
1910	190		24.2%
1920	172		−9.5%
1930	194		12.8%
1940	204		5.2%
1950	198		−2.9%
1960	190		−4.0%
1970	190		0.0%
1980	172		−9.5%
1990	157		−8.7%
2000	176		12.1%
2010	142		−19.3%
2020	139		−2.1%
U.S. Decennial Census

=== 2010 census ===
As of the census of 2010, there were 142 people, 60 households, and 41 families residing in the village. The population density was 417.6 inhabitants per square mile (161.2/km^{2}). There were 65 housing units at an average density of 191.2 per square mile (73.8/km^{2}). The racial makeup of the village was 95.8% White, 0.7% Asian, and 3.5% from two or more races. Hispanic or Latino of any race were 0.7% of the population.

There were 60 households, of which 28.3% had children under the age of 18 living with them, 56.7% were married couples living together, 11.7% had a female householder with no husband present, and 31.7% were non-families. 26.7% of all households were made up of individuals, and 13.4% had someone living alone who was 65 years of age or older. The average household size was 2.37 and the average family size was 2.93.

The median age in the village was 41.3 years. 21.8% of residents were under the age of 18; 4.8% were between the ages of 18 and 24; 28.8% were from 25 to 44; 28.9% were from 45 to 64; and 15.5% were 65 years of age or older. The gender makeup of the village was 49.3% male and 50.7% female.

=== 2000 census ===
As of the census of 2000, there were 176 people, 66 households, and 45 families residing in the town. The population density was 515.4 inhabitants per square mile (199.0/km^{2}). There were 68 housing units at an average density of 199.1 per square mile (76.9/km^{2}). The racial makeup of the town was 98.86% White, and 1.14% from two or more races. Hispanic or Latino of any race were 2.27% of the population.

There were 66 households, out of which 39.4% had children under the age of 18 living with them, 56.1% were married couples living together, 12.1% had a female householder with no husband present, and 31.8% were non-families. 31.8% of all households were made up of individuals, and 24.2% had someone living alone who was 65 years of age or older. The average household size was 2.67 and the average family size was 3.33.

In the town the population was spread out, with 31.3% under the age of 18, 8.5% from 18 to 24, 30.1% from 25 to 44, 13.1% from 45 to 64, and 17.0% who were 65 years of age or older. The median age was 31 years. For every 100 females, there were 79.6 males. For every 100 females age 18 and over, there were 86.2 males.

The median income for a household in the town was $37,000, and the median income for a family was $41,250. Males had a median income of $28,750 versus $18,750 for females. The per capita income for the town was $16,989. About 6.0% of families and 8.8% of the population were below the poverty line, including 5.6% of those under the age of eighteen and 25.0% of those 65 or over.

== Education ==
It is in the Gasconade County R-I School District.
