= Loutre River (Missouri River) =

River in the American state of Missouri

The Loutre River as seen at the Loutre Lick Public Fishing Access south west of Mineola, Missouri.

The Loutre River (/ˈluːtər/ LOO-tər) is a 58.4-mile-long (94.0 km) tributary of the Missouri River in the United States. The Loutre River begins in Audrain County. It flows into the Missouri River from the north in Montgomery County opposite the town of Hermann. Loutre, meaning "otter", was applied to the river by French trappers. At Mineola, the river has a mean annual discharge of 98 cubic feet per second.

== Location ==
Mouth
Confluence with the Missouri River in Warren County, Missouri: 38°42′43″N 91°25′03″W
Source
Audrain County, Missouri: 39°05′27″N 91°47′28″W

== History ==
The Loutre River is threaded through the area's history. It was the means of transportation and the trade route for Native Americans, early European and American settlers in early Montgomery Country.

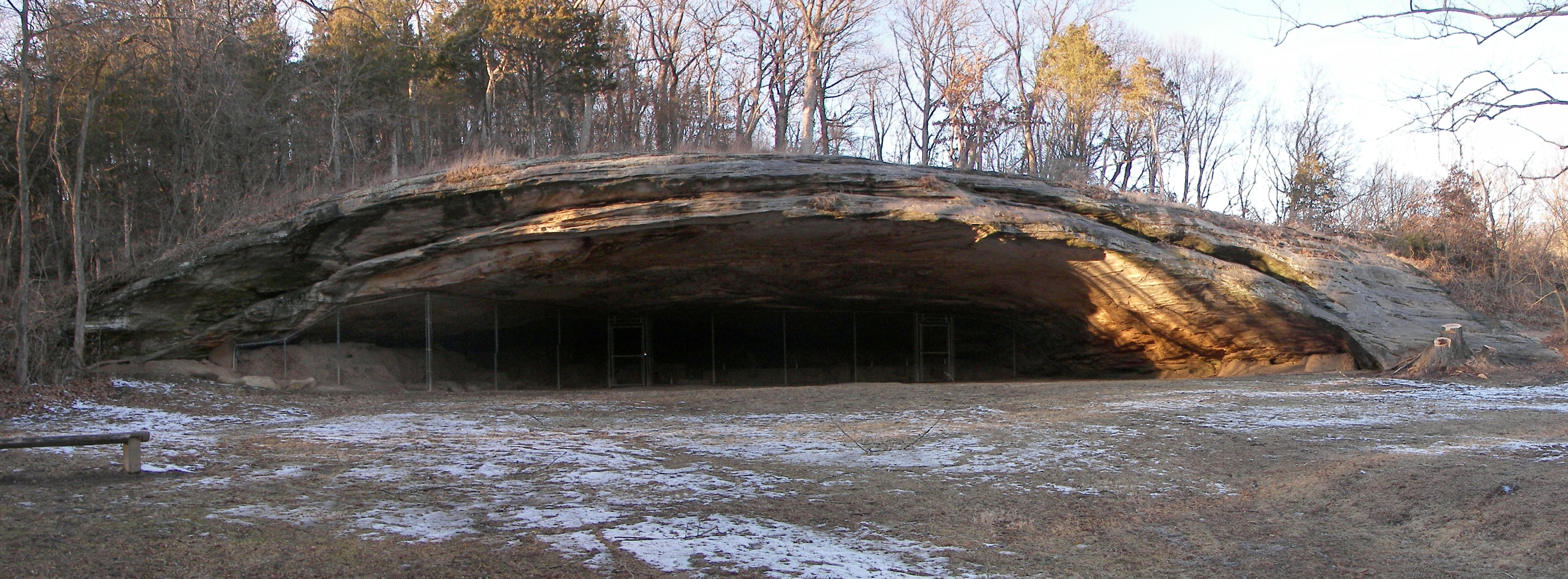
Graham Cave looks out over the Loutre River valley.

Historical evidence of human activities in and around the Loutre River date over 10,000 years. Loutre River travels through Graham Cave State Park in Montgomery County. Graham Cave is located in the hills directly above the river. When discovered, the cave helped rewrite history books. During archaeological excavation by the University of Missouri from 1949 to 1955, the cave yielded evidence of ancient Dalton and Archaic Period Native Americans. Within the cave was an ancient ceremonial location dating to 8000 B.C.E.

Loutre Township comprises the southern portion of Montgomery County. The first Europeans to settle in the county were on Loutre Island perhaps as early as 1798, while the country was under control of Spain. The island was first discovered by French trappers and voyageurs.

Loutre Lick was one of the earliest settlements in Montgomery County, settled between 1808 and 1810, and named because of its location near a salt lick at the river. It was also called Van Bibbers Lick, for Major Isaac Van Bibber, who migrated in 1800 from Kentucky to Missouri. Here he erected a hotel, some cabins, and stables. He tried unsuccessfully to operate a salt mill. Loutre Lick was succeeded by present-day Mineola, Missouri.

Loutre Lick was probably the first mineral spring in Missouri to be developed as a kind of health resort. Here Daniel Boone and Thomas Hart Benton sought relief for their ailments. Benton bragged of the Loutre Lick spring in the halls of Congress, where Henry Clay referred to him as the "Senator from Missouri's Bethesda."

Skirmishes took place between Indians and encroaching settlers. The Army established Fort Clemson on Loutre Island as a base of operations to protect American settlers. On March 7, 1815 Captain Callaway and three soldiers (James McMillin, Parks Hutchings, Frank McDermid) were killed after pursuing Sauk and Fox Indians who had stolen horses from settlers. Captain Callaway, with Lieutenant Riggs and fourteen men left Fort Clemson, on Loutre Island, in pursuit of the Indians. While they first recaptured the horses about 12 miles away guarded mostly by women, the Army group was later fired upon by the Indian warriors. Captain Callaway's body was not found until several days after his death, when it was discovered by Benjamin Howell. His gun had been recovered several days before. Callaway and his three soldiers were buried where they had been killed. Headstones can be found at the burial site today on private property. They are in the middle of a sheep grazing field about 100 yards from the banks of the river and 300 yards from the Loutre River crossing of Mill Pond Road in rural Montgomery County.

Around September 1, 1832 famed author Washington Irving visited Montgomery County on his way to the far west. He stayed about one day at Loutre Lick, where he wandered among the picturesque hills in the vicinity. To Major Van Bibber he said, "When I get rich I'm coming to this place and build a nice residence here."

While most of the springs used commercially in the 1800s and early 1900s have since stopped flowing, several springs can still be found, especially along the banks of the river at Mineola. Isaac Van Bibber's house in Mineola has a continuous spring that flows year round through its original rock basement. It is believed many of the springs arose after the 1812 New Madrid earthquake.

The Loutre Island area is commonly associated with the German-founded towns of Rhineland and Starkenburg, which has several historically significant Catholic churches and sites, including the Shrine of Our Lady of Sorrows, a church devoted to the Virgin Mary. These were originally German-language congregations, part of German settlement in the mid-19th century. The settlers came from Hermann, on the south side of the Missouri. They founded vineyards in this area as well.

One mile north of McKittrick on Missouri State Route 19 the 180 grave Loutre Island Cemetery can be found. This is an African-American cemetery, named as a result of being on an actual island of the Loutre River at the time of its inception in 1804. The Loutre River's mouth was at this location where it entered into the Missouri River. Today the Missouri River is much narrower than it was at the time of the cemetery's inception in the early 1800s when it was over 1½ miles wide at this point. Today this cemetery is almost two miles north of the banks of the Missouri River. This cemetery was used for burials for the 150 year period from 1804 to approximately 1954, and was also called George Washington Cemetery during that time.

Montgomery County had several plantations and slavery was common during the early-mid 1800s. The lowlands surrounding the Loutre River as it approached the Missouri River plain were farmed with hemp and tobacco, primarily with the use of slave labor. An African-American settlement was founded around 1800 commonly called Little Africa on one of the county's highest points at almost 1,000 feet of elevation overlooking the Loutre River near McKittrick. At its peak, having a population of nearly 200, today very little evidence of the rich African-American history remains in this area. The German settlement of Hermann on the opposite bank of the Missouri River ardently opposed slavery and as such the Missouri River made for not just a geographical divide, but also an ideological one. As a result of this position, first adopted in the 1840s, Hermann became a center for the mustering of black troops into the militia for the Civil War. Hermann was well known as a place of safe refuge for fugitive slaves from the surrounding area, and often those fugitives settled at Little Africa surrounding the Loutre River.

== Present day ==
In July 2000, Cargill Pork, Inc.'s hog farm in Martinsburg, Missouri illegally discharged hog waste from its holding ponds into the Loutre River. The United States Environmental Protection Agency said the release occurred because of improper handling of waste management equipment by Cargill Pork, Inc., a subsidiary of Cargill. After the waste release, which occurred over a five-day period, the EPA said 53,000 fish were killed along a five-mile stretch of the river. Cargill was fined $1.55 million, including $51,000 as restitution for damage to the environment.

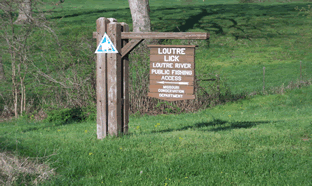
The entrance sign for the Loutre Lick Public Fishing Access south west of Mineola, Missouri as seen from State Highway N.

The Missouri Department of Conservation owns and maintains the Loutre Lick Public Fishing Access (163 acres) 3 miles south of I-70 on Route N (Mineola exit) then three-quarters of a mile on County Road 278. Bass, catfish, sunfish, and crappie are abundant in this section of the river. The forest, cropland, and old fields also provide for good public deer, dove, quail, rabbit, squirrel, turkey, and waterfowl hunting. Trapping is allowed with a Special Use Permit.

Graham Cave State Park maintains a paved boat access to the river accessible for free by park patrons with a large paved parking area along with barbecue grills and picnic tables. The park also maintains the Loutre River trail, a publicly accessible hiking and mountain biking trail that runs adjacent to the river bank for about one-half mile.

The Loutre River, the Auxvasse Creek, and the Prairie Fork Creek are the only known bodies of water where the rare blacknose shiner fish species can still be found in Missouri. The appearance of blacknose shiner is considered a marker of very high water quality and pristine stream conditions.

The Katy Trail State Park, a 225-mile-long former railroad bed converted to public use, crosses the Loutre River at McKittrick by means of an iron truss bridge built by the A.P. Roberts Company in 1897. It has been preserved with a wood deck for continued public use.

Interstate 70 crosses the Loutre River in Montgomery County. The Interstate's dip into the Loutre River valley is known locally as Mineola Hill; it is one of the steepest grades on a Missouri Interstate highway. Just south of the highway crossing is Mineola and just north is Graham Cave.

A large piece of St. Peter Sandstone is preserved in the median of the interstate as a historic site. It is known locally as "Slave Rock" or "Picnic Rock". Local tradition holds that before the abolition of slavery, periodic local slave auctions were held atop the rock. It was also the site of seasonal picnics held by the Graham family. Later they donated to the state the property where the Graham Cave was excavated. St. Peter Sandstone is believed by geologists to have formed the coast line of a prehistoric sea stretching from Minnesota through Iowa, Illinois, and Missouri.

As part of the planned rebuild of Interstate 70 throughout Missouri, this particular stretch has generated some controversy. Highway engineers have to correct the steep grade while preserving the many historic and environmentally significant sites that surround it, including Slave Rock, the Loutre River, Graham Cave, Danville Glades Conservation Area, and others.

Seasonal flooding continues to alter the course of the river. The Loutre Island no longer exists, as the slough that once surrounded the island no longer connects to the river. The island has become part of the bank of the river. The now defunct but standing Loutre Island chapel is accessible from Missouri State Route 94. The Loutre Island Cemetery along Missouri State Route 19 still carries the Loutre Island name. Near Mineola, the river has begun to reclaim fertile cropland.

The Flood of 1993 raised water levels along the length of the Loutre River to great heights. Lasting changes of the flood can be seen in severely eroding banks along some sections. The breach of the eastern bank levee of the Loutre just south of the Katy Trail crossing at McKittrick created two large permanent lakes and washed out Missouri State Route 19. It created an 80-foot-deep (24 m) crater that isolated the two banks of the river until it could be filled. Traveling on Route 19 through this area, visitors can still see evidence of the flooding. The two permanent lakes are visible to the west of the highway, where most trees and permanent foliage were destroyed by the breach.

Recently Asian carp have begun to inhabit the mouth of the river, arriving as an invasive species from the Missouri River. This sometimes makes boat fishing treacherous along the first 1–2 miles of the Loutre out of the Missouri.

== Tributaries ==
- Warden Branch
- Bear Creek
- Whippoorwill Creek
- Dry Fork
- Clear Creek
- Dishwater Creek
- Pinch Creek
- Sallee Branch
- Massey Branch
- McIntosh Branch
- Bachelor Creek
