= Shrine of Our Lady of Sorrows =

Historic church in Missouri, United States

- U.S. National Register of Historic Places
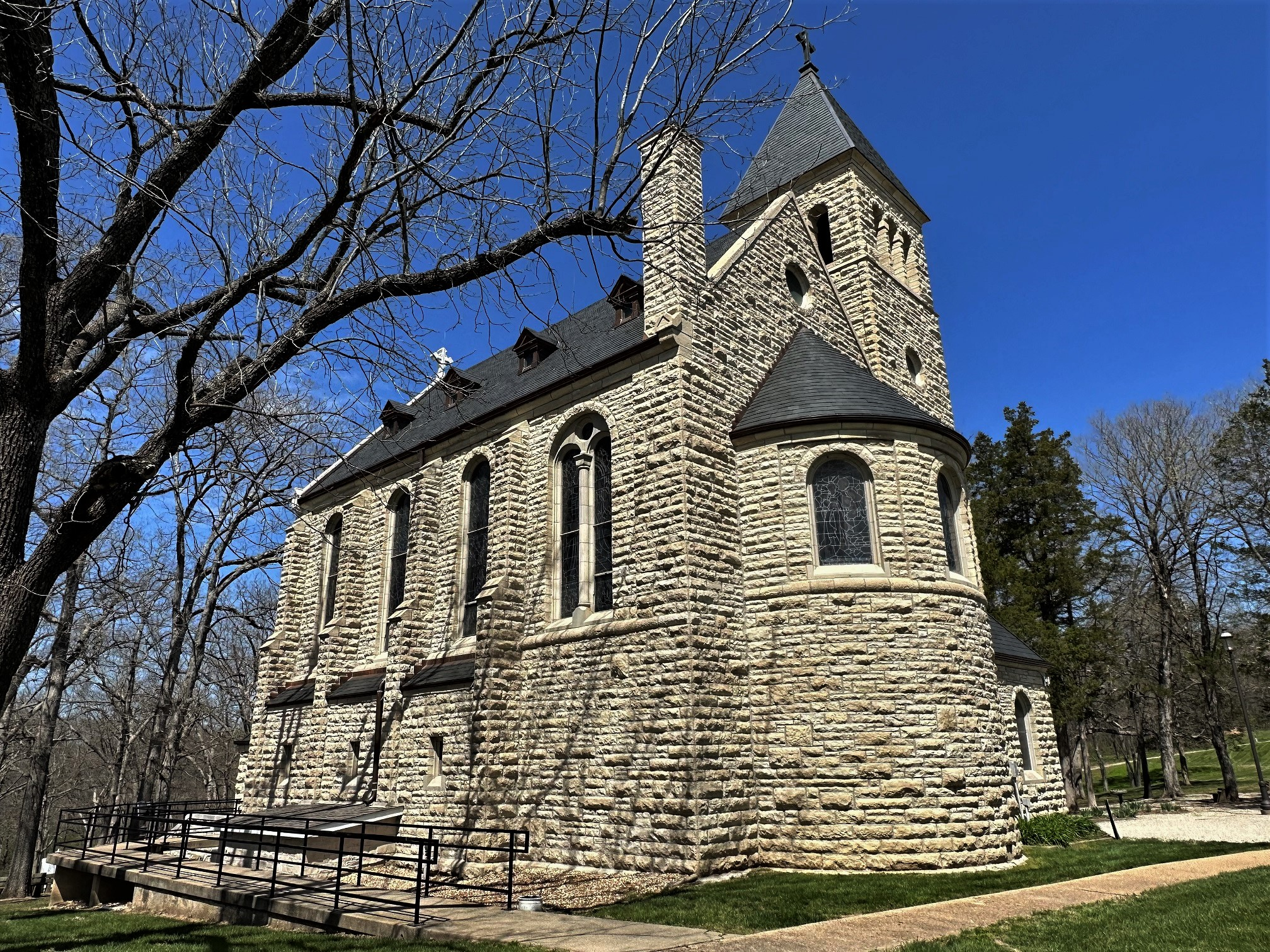
- Shrine of Our Lady of Sorrows in 2024

- Location within Missouri Location within the United States
- Location: SR P, Starkenburg, Missouri
- Coordinates: 38°44′2″N 91°33′10″W
- Area: 40 acres (16 ha)
- Built: 1873, 1888, 1900, 1906-1910
- Architectural style: Romanesque architecture, Gothic Revival
- NRHP reference No.: 82003153
- Added to NRHP: September 09, 1982

The Shrine of Our Lady of Sorrows is a historic Roman Catholic church located at Starkenburg, Montgomery County, Missouri. It is dedicated to Our Lady of Sorrows. In addition to Stations of the Cross and two grottos, the shrine includes the Church of the Risen Savior (1873), Chapel of Our Lady of Sorrows (1910), and Log Chapel (1888). The Chapel of Our Lady of Sorrows replaced an earlier 19th-century log church, which was retained on the site as a chapel. The shrine was built by a congregation of mid-19th century German immigrants and their descendants. The Church of the Risen Savior is a Gothic Revival style limestone block structure. The bell tower was added in 1891.

The Chapel of Our Lady of Sorrows was designed by Professor Becker of Mainz, Germany, with John Walchshauser, an architect from St. Louis. The Romanesque Revival style structure was built between 1906 and 1910, with limestone quarried by parishioners and much labor provided by them.

It was listed on the National Register of Historic Places in 1982.

== See also ==
- Our Lady of Sorrows
