= Montgomery City, Missouri =

City in Missouri, U.S.

- City
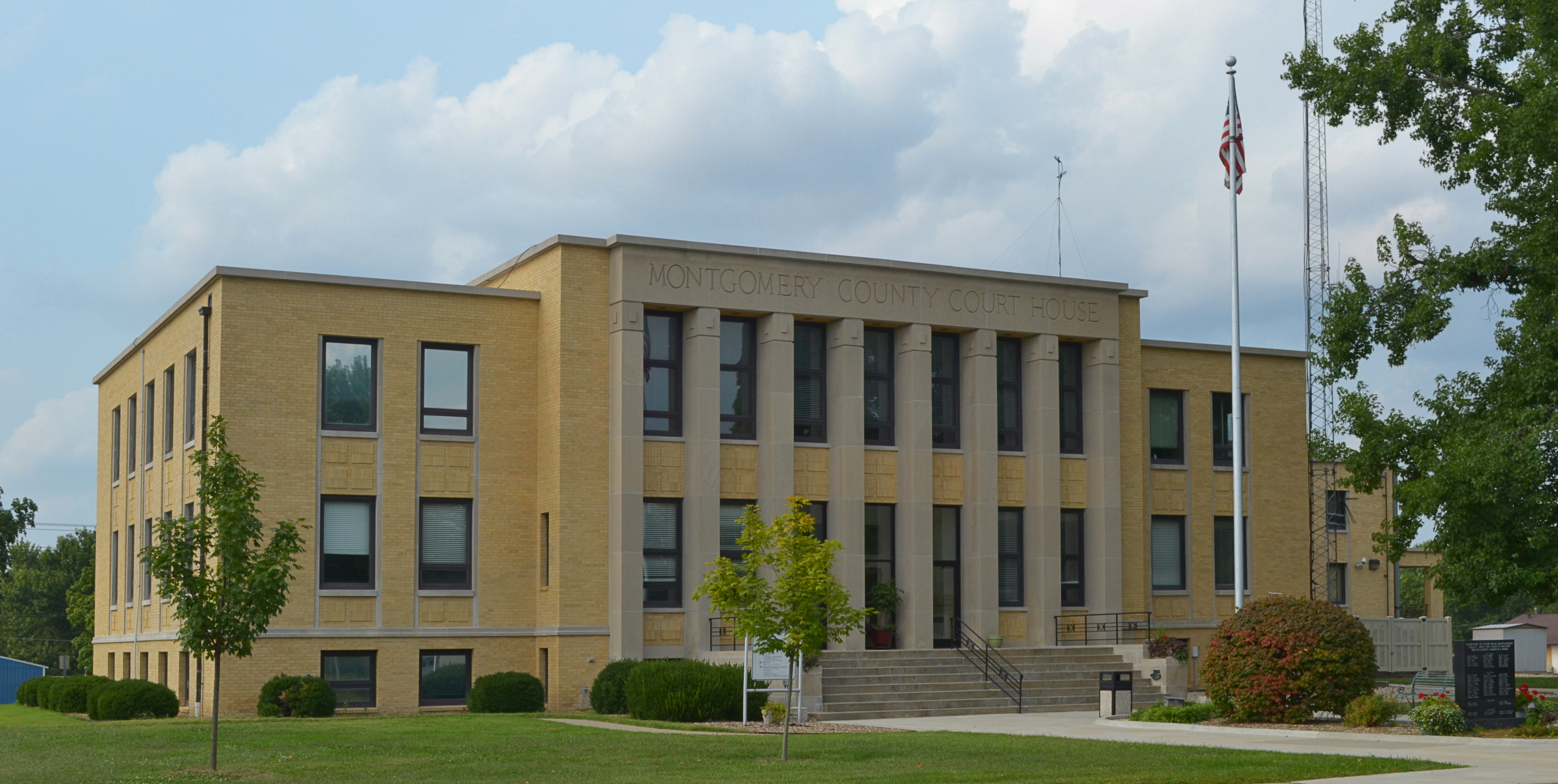
- Downtown Immaculate Conception Catholic Church Domed Building in Montgomery City Montgomery County Courthouse

- Location in Montgomery County and the state of Missouri
- Coordinates: 38°58′25″N 91°30′09″W
- Country: United States
- State: Missouri
- County: Montgomery
- Founded: 1853
- Incorporated: 1857

Government
  - Mayor: Mike Spirz
  - City Administrator: Steven Deves

Area
  - Total: 3.41 sq mi (8.82 km^{2})
  - Land: 3.37 sq mi (8.74 km^{2})
  - Water: 0.027 sq mi (0.07 km^{2})
- Elevation: 837 ft (255 m)

Population (2020)
  - Total: 2,811
  - Density: 832.8/sq mi (321.54/km^{2})
- Time zone: UTC-6 (Central (CST))
  - Summer (DST): UTC-5 (CDT)
- ZIP code: 63361
- Area code: 573
- FIPS code: 29-49574
- GNIS feature ID: 2395382
- Website: www.montgomerycitymo.org

Montgomery City is a city in and the county seat of Montgomery County, Missouri, United States. The population was 2,811 at the 2020 census.

== History ==
Montgomery was platted in 1853, taking its name from Montgomery County. A post office called Montgomery City has been in operation since 1857.

The Sylvester Marion and Frances Anne Stephens Baker House was listed on the National Register of Historic Places in 1999.

== Geography ==
Montgomery City is in central Montgomery County. Two state highways pass through the city center: Missouri Route 19 follows Sturgeon Street, leading northwest 8 miles (13 km) to Wellsville and southeast 5 miles (8 km) to New Florence, while Missouri Route 161 follows West 2nd Street and East 3rd Street, leading north-northeast 14 miles (23 km) to Middletown and southwest 5 miles (8 km) to Danville.

According to the U.S. Census Bureau, Montgomery City has a total area of 3.40 square miles (8.81 km^{2}), of which 3.38 square miles (8.75 km^{2}) are land and 0.03 square miles (0.08 km^{2}), or 0.85%, are water. The city is oriented along a slight ridge which drains northeast toward Elkhorn Creek, part of the Cuivre River watershed flowing east to the Mississippi; and drains southwest to Clear Fork, part of the Loutre River watershed leading to the Missouri River.

== Demographics ==
Historical population
Census	Pop.	Note	%±
1880	1,165		—
1890	2,199		88.8%
1900	2,026		−7.9%
1910	1,789		−11.7%
1920	1,688		−5.6%
1930	1,510		−10.5%
1940	1,671		10.7%
1950	1,679		0.5%
1960	1,918		14.2%
1970	2,187		14.0%
1980	2,101		−3.9%
1990	2,281		8.6%
2000	2,442		7.1%
2010	2,834		16.1%
2020	2,811		−0.8%
U.S. Decennial Census

=== 2020 census ===
As of the 2020 census, Montgomery City had a population of 2,811. The median age was 39.3 years. 25.0% of residents were under the age of 18 and 17.5% of residents were 65 years of age or older. For every 100 females there were 94.3 males, and for every 100 females age 18 and over there were 92.1 males age 18 and over.

0.0% of residents lived in urban areas, while 100.0% lived in rural areas.

There were 1,165 households in Montgomery City, of which 31.9% had children under the age of 18 living in them. Of all households, 41.3% were married-couple households, 18.1% were households with a male householder and no spouse or partner present, and 30.1% were households with a female householder and no spouse or partner present. About 31.9% of all households were made up of individuals and 14.9% had someone living alone who was 65 years of age or older.

There were 1,315 housing units, of which 11.4% were vacant. The homeowner vacancy rate was 2.4% and the rental vacancy rate was 10.9%.

Racial composition as of the 2020 census
Race	Number	Percent
White	2,520	89.6%
Black or African American	59	2.1%
American Indian and Alaska Native	4	0.1%
Asian	22	0.8%
Native Hawaiian and Other Pacific Islander	3	0.1%
Some other race	41	1.5%
Two or more races	162	5.8%
Hispanic or Latino (of any race)	74	2.6%

=== 2010 census ===
As of the census of 2010, there were 2,834 people, 1,141 households, and 711 families living in the city. The population density was 894.0 inhabitants per square mile (345.2/km^{2}). There were 1,279 housing units at an average density of 403.5 per square mile (155.8/km^{2}). The racial makeup of the city was 92.6% White, 3.6% African American, 0.2% Native American, 0.1% Asian, 1.9% from other races, and 1.5% from two or more races. Hispanic or Latino of any race were 2.6% of the population.

There were 1,141 households, of which 33.1% had children under the age of 18 living with them, 44.8% were married couples living together, 12.8% had a female householder with no husband present, 4.7% had a male householder with no wife present, and 37.7% were non-families. 32.5% of all households were made up of individuals, and 13.6% had someone living alone who was 65 years of age or older. The average household size was 2.36 and the average family size was 2.97.

The median age in the city was 35.3 years. 26.6% of residents were under the age of 18; 8.2% were between the ages of 18 and 24; 26.4% were from 25 to 44; 24.7% were from 45 to 64; and 14.3% were 65 years of age or older. The gender makeup of the city was 48.7% male and 51.3% female.

=== 2000 census ===
As of the census of 2000, there were 2,442 people, 1,032 households, and 666 families living in the city. The population density was 858.6 inhabitants per square mile (331.5/km^{2}). There were 1,162 housing units at an average density of 408.5 per square mile (157.7/km^{2}). The racial makeup of the city was 94.19% White, 3.81% African American, 0.25% Native American, 0.16% Asian, 0.25% from other races, and 1.35% from two or more races. Hispanic or Latino of any race were 0.33% of the population.

There were 1,032 households, out of which 30.7% had children under the age of 18 living with them, 49.7% were married couples living together, 11.7% had a female householder with no husband present, and 35.4% were non-families. 31.3% of all households were made up of individuals, and 15.4% had someone living alone who was 65 years of age or older. The average household size was 2.29 and the average family size was 2.88.

In the city, the population was spread out, with 24.2% under the age of 18, 9.2% from 18 to 24, 27.4% from 25 to 44, 22.4% from 45 to 64, and 16.7% who were 65 years of age or older. The median age was 37 years. For every 100 females, there were 91.8 males. For every 100 females age 18 and over, there were 85.7 males.

The median income for a household in the city was $30,446, and the median income for a family was $38,063. Males had a median income of $28,906 versus $17,857 for females. The per capita income for the city was $15,735. About 10.9% of families and 14.0% of the population were below the poverty line, including 18.7% of those under age 18 and 12.8% of those age 65 or over.

== Education ==
Public education in Montgomery City is administered by Montgomery County R-II School District. The district covers all of the city.

Montgomery City has a lending library, the Montgomery City Public Library.

== Notable people ==
- Ray Moore, the creator of the comic strip The Phantom
- Jeff Porter, former mayor of Montgomery City, elected in 2018 to the Missouri House of Representatives from the 42nd district

== See also ==
- List of cities in Missouri
