= Montgomery County, Missouri =

County in Missouri, United States

- County
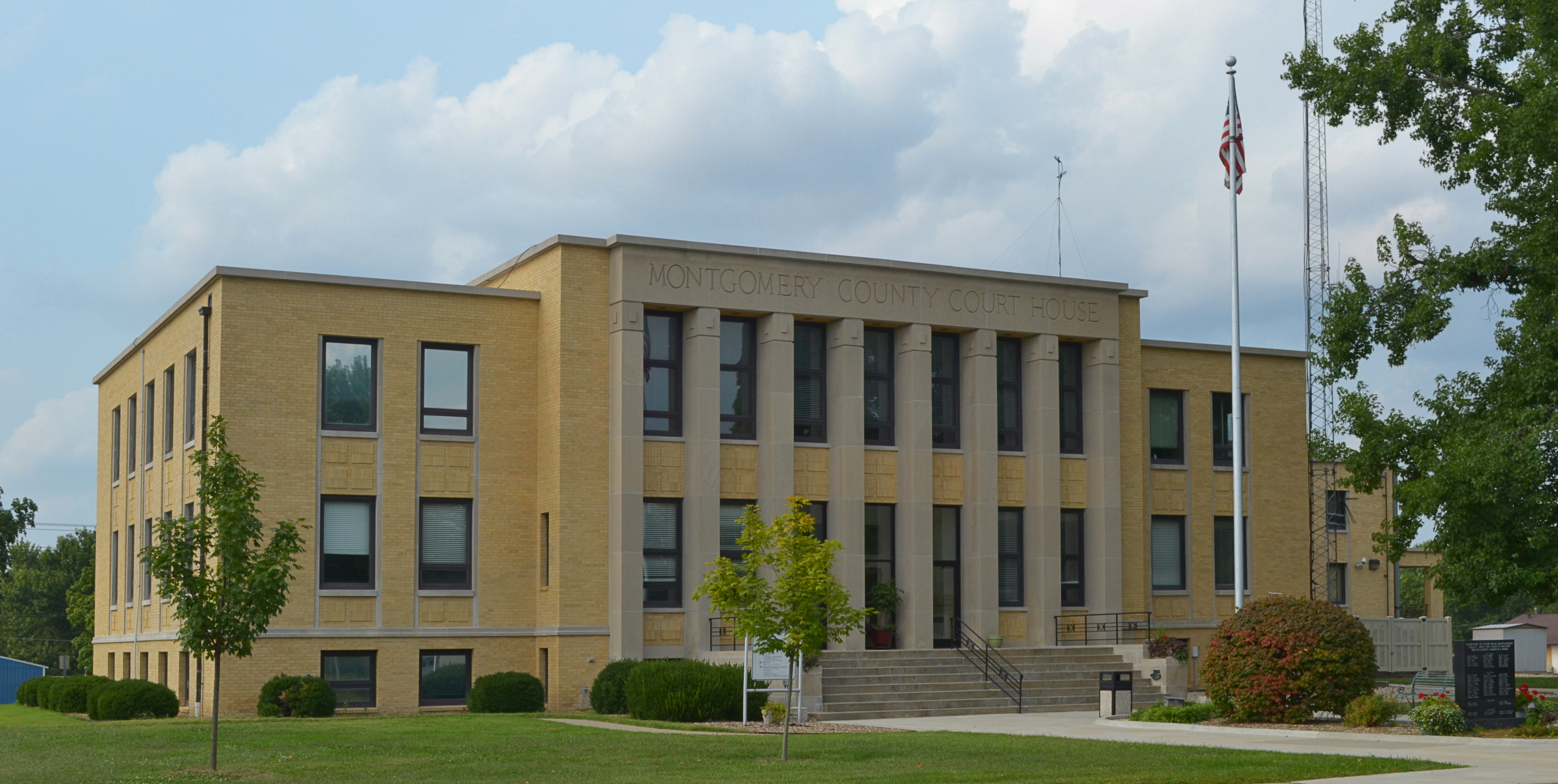
- The Montgomery County Courthouse in Montgomery City

- Location within the U.S. state of Missouri
- Coordinates: 38°56′N 91°28′W
- Country: United States
- State: Missouri
- Founded: December 14, 1818
- Named for: Richard Montgomery
- Seat: Montgomery City
- Largest city: Montgomery City

Area
  - Total: 542 sq mi (1,400 km^{2})
  - Land: 536 sq mi (1,390 km^{2})
  - Water: 5.8 sq mi (15 km^{2}) 1.1%

Population (2020)
  - Total: 11,322
  - Estimate (2025): 11,590 ▲
  - Density: 21.1/sq mi (8.16/km^{2})
- Time zone: UTC−6 (Central)
  - Summer (DST): UTC−5 (CDT)
- Congressional district: 3rd
- Website: mcmo.us

Montgomery County is a county in the east central part of the U.S. state of Missouri. As of the 2020 census, the population was 11,322. Its county seat is Montgomery City. The county was named in honor of Richard Montgomery, an American Revolutionary War general killed in 1775 while attempting to capture Quebec City, Canada.

The county comprises a portion of the Missouri Rhineland. It is approximately halfway between Columbia and St. Louis.

== History ==
The county has evidence of human habitation from 10,000 years ago, the Archaic period of indigenous Americans. An ancient site was found during archaeological excavations at Graham Cave on the Loutre River.

In the early 19th century, European settlement started at a greater pace, after exploration during previous decades by French trappers and British and American fur traders.

Although the Loutre Island area is commonly associated with the German-founded towns of Rhineland and Starkenburg, established by immigrants of the mid-19th century and later, it was originally settled by Missouri's Anglo-southern settlers from places such as Kentucky or Virginia. Although the southern part of the county is more closely associated with Missouri's Rhineland, its northern part is more associated with Missouri's "Little Dixie" region, earning Montgomery county the nickname "Gateway to Little Dixie".

An early house of worship was a log church, which is still maintained as a chapel. St. Martin's Church is also located in Starkenburg, built in 1873 and listed on the National Register of Historic Places. Above its entrance is the text: "This is the House Of God and the Gate Of Heaven."

Starkenburg is also the site of the Shrine of Our Lady of Sorrows Catholic Church, built in the early 20th century and listed on the NRHP. For further devotions and pilgrimage, the community created an outdoor area for representations of the Stations of the Cross, Mount Calvary and Holy Sepulchre. Starkenburg is located inland from the Missouri River. After the destructive Great Flood of 1993, Rhineland citizens used federal funds to relocate their houses 1.5 miles (2.4 km) inland away from the river.

== Geography ==
According to the U.S. Census Bureau, the county has a total area of 542 square miles (1,400 km^{2}), of which 536 square miles (1,390 km^{2}) is land and 5.8 square miles (15 km^{2}) (1.1%) is water.

=== Adjacent counties ===
- Audrain County (northwest)
- Pike County (northeast)
- Lincoln County (east)
- Warren County (southeast)
- Gasconade County (south)
- Callaway County (west)
- Osage County (southwest)

=== Major highways ===
- Interstate 70
- U.S. Route 40
- Route 19
- Route 94
- Route 161

== Climate ==
Montgomery County

Climate chart (precipitation, max. and min. temperature)
| J | F | M | A | M | J | J | A | S | O | N | D |
| 58 1 −8 | 86 3 −6 | 104 13 1 | 213 23 7 | 134 23 13 | 109 26 17 | 66 27 20 | 97 26 19 | 94 24 14 | 102 18 8 | 43 13 4 | 74 4 −4 |
- █ Average max. and min. temperatures in °C
- █ Precipitation totals in mm
Imperial conversion
| J | F | M | A | M | J | J | A | S | O | N | D |
| 2.3 34 18 | 3.4 37 21 | 4.1 55 34 | 8.4 73 45 | 5.3 73 55 | 4.3 79 63 | 2.6 81 68 | 3.8 79 66 | 3.7 75 57 | 4 64 46 | 1.7 55 39 | 2.9 39 25 |
- █ Average max. and min. temperatures in °F
- █ Precipitation totals in inches

== Demographics ==
Historical population
| Census | Pop. | Note | %± |
|---|---|---|---|
| 1820 | 3,074 | | — |
| 1830 | 3,902 | | 26.9% |
| 1840 | 4,371 | | 12.0% |
| 1850 | 5,489 | | 25.6% |
| 1860 | 9,718 | | 77.0% |
| 1870 | 10,405 | | 7.1% |
| 1880 | 16,249 | | 56.2% |
| 1890 | 16,850 | | 3.7% |
| 1900 | 16,571 | | −1.7% |
| 1910 | 15,604 | | −5.8% |
| 1920 | 15,233 | | −2.4% |
| 1930 | 13,011 | | −14.6% |
| 1940 | 12,442 | | −4.4% |
| 1950 | 11,555 | | −7.1% |
| 1960 | 11,097 | | −4.0% |
| 1970 | 11,000 | | −0.9% |
| 1980 | 11,537 | | 4.9% |
| 1990 | 11,355 | | −1.6% |
| 2000 | 12,136 | | 6.9% |
| 2010 | 12,236 | | 0.8% |
| 2020 | 11,322 | | −7.5% |
| 2025 (est.) | 11,590 | ▲ | 2.4% |
U.S. Decennial Census; 1790-1960 1900-1990; 1990-2000 2010-2015

=== Racial and ethnic composition ===
Montgomery County, Missouri – Racial and ethnic composition Note: the US Census treats Hispanic/Latino as an ethnic category. This table excludes Latinos from the racial categories and assigns them to a separate category. Hispanics/Latinos may be of any race.
| Race / Ethnicity (NH = Non-Hispanic) | Pop 1980 | Pop 1990 | Pop 2000 | Pop 2010 | Pop 2020 | % 1980 | % 1990 | % 2000 | % 2010 | % 2020 |
|---|---|---|---|---|---|---|---|---|---|---|
| White alone (NH) | 11,098 | 10,987 | 11,596 | 11,642 | 10,444 | 96.19% | 96.76% | 95.55% | 95.15% | 92.25% |
| Black or African American alone (NH) | 364 | 289 | 245 | 199 | 101 | 3.16% | 2.55% | 2.02% | 1.63% | 0.89% |
| Native American or Alaska Native alone (NH) | 16 | 12 | 29 | 22 | 22 | 0.14% | 0.11% | 0.24% | 0.18% | 0.19% |
| Asian alone (NH) | 8 | 20 | 30 | 31 | 50 | 0.07% | 0.18% | 0.25% | 0.25% | 0.44% |
| Native Hawaiian or Pacific Islander alone (NH) | x | x | 1 | 2 | 5 | x | x | 0.01% | 0.02% | 0.04% |
| Other race alone (NH) | 2 | 2 | 7 | 3 | 22 | 0.02% | 0.02% | 0.06% | 0.02% | 0.19% |
| Mixed race or Multiracial (NH) | x | x | 134 | 165 | 449 | x | x | 1.10% | 1.35% | 3.97% |
| Hispanic or Latino (any race) | 49 | 45 | 94 | 172 | 229 | 0.42% | 0.40% | 0.77% | 1.41% | 2.02% |
| Total | 11,537 | 11,355 | 12,136 | 12,236 | 11,322 | 100.00% | 100.00% | 100.00% | 100.00% | 100.00% |

=== 2020 census ===
As of the 2020 census, the county had a population of 11,322, and the median age was 45.1 years. 21.9% of residents were under the age of 18 and 21.7% were 65 years of age or older. For every 100 females there were 101.4 males, and for every 100 females age 18 and over there were 100.9 males age 18 and over.

The racial makeup of the county was 92.9% White, 0.9% Black or African American, 0.3% American Indian and Alaska Native, 0.5% Asian, 0.0% Native Hawaiian and Pacific Islander, 0.8% from some other race, and 4.6% from two or more races. Hispanic or Latino residents of any race comprised 2.0% of the population.

According to the 2020 Decennial Census Demographic and Housing Characteristics data, 0.0% of residents lived in urban areas, while 100.0% lived in rural areas.

There were 4,640 households in the county, of which 26.8% had children under the age of 18 living with them and 22.5% had a female householder with no spouse or partner present. About 29.4% of all households were made up of individuals and 13.8% had someone living alone who was 65 years of age or older.

There were 5,758 housing units, of which 19.4% were vacant. Among occupied housing units, 74.4% were owner-occupied and 25.6% were renter-occupied. The homeowner vacancy rate was 2.4% and the rental vacancy rate was 9.0%.

=== 2000 census ===
As of the census of 2000, there were 12,136 people, 4,775 households, and 3,337 families residing in the county. The population density was 23 people per square mile (8.9 people/km^{2}). There were 5,726 housing units at an average density of 11 per square mile (4.2/km^{2}). The racial makeup of the county was 95.97% White, 2.04% Black or African American, 0.24% Native American, 0.26% Asian, 0.01% Pacific Islander, 0.21% from other races, and 1.28% from two or more races. Approximately 0.77% of the population were Hispanic or Latino of any race. 39.1% were of German, 18.4% American, 10.2% English and 9.2% Irish ancestry.

There were 4,775 households, out of which 31.30% had children under the age of 18 living with them, 56.90% were married couples living together, 8.60% had a female householder with no husband present, and 30.10% were non-families. 26.30% of all households were made up of individuals, and 13.20% had someone living alone who was 65 years of age or older. The average household size was 2.47 and the average family size was 2.97.

In the county, the population was spread out, with 25.40% under the age of 18, 7.40% from 18 to 24, 26.10% from 25 to 44, 23.90% from 45 to 64, and 17.20% who were 65 years of age or older. The median age was 39 years. For every 100 females there were 98.10 males. For every 100 females age 18 and over, there were 93.70 males.

The median income for a household in the county was $32,772, and the median income for a family was $38,632. Males had a median income of $27,933 versus $19,809 for females. The per capita income for the county was $15,092. About 8.40% of families and 11.80% of the population were below the poverty line, including 15.60% of those under age 18 and 10.60% of those age 65 or over.

== Community groups ==
- Montgomery County Human Resource Board
- Montgomery County Citizens for Health Improvement Project
- Montgomery County Women in Agriculture
- Wellsville-Middletown Young Farmers/Young Farm Wives
- Montgomery City Lions Club
- Montgomery County Knights of Columbus
- Montgomery County Literacy Council
- Montgomery County Extension Council
- Montgomery County 4-H Council
- Customs and Classics Car Club
- Montgomery County Old Threshers Association
- Montgomery County Fair Association

== Education ==
School districts include:

- Community R-VI School District
- Gasconade County R-I School District
- Montgomery County R-II School District
- Silex R-I School District
- Troy R-III School District
- Wellsville-Middletown R-I School District

=== Public schools ===
- Montgomery County R-II School District – Montgomery City
  - Montgomery County Elementary School (PK–5)
  - Jonesburg Elementary School (PK–5) – Jonesburg
  - Montgomery County Middle School (grades 6–8)
  - Montgomery County High School (9–12)
- Wellsville-Middletown R-I School District – Wellsville
  - Wellsville Elementary School (PK–6)
  - Wellsville High School (7–12)

=== Private schools ===
- Immaculate Conception School – Montgomery City (PK-06) – Roman Catholic

=== Public libraries ===
- Montgomery City Public Library
- Wellsville Public Library

== Communities ==
=== Cities ===
- Bellflower
- High Hill
- Jonesburg
- McKittrick
- Middletown
- Montgomery City (county seat)
- New Florence
- Wellsville

=== Village ===
- Rhineland

=== Census-designated places ===
- Big Spring
- Buell
- Danville

=== Other unincorporated places ===
- Americus
- Bluffton
- Egbert
- Gamma
- Marling
- Mineola
- Prices Branch
- Starkenburg

== Politics ==
=== Local ===
The Republican Party controls politics at the local level in Montgomery County. Republicans hold all of the elected positions in the county.

Montgomery County, Missouri

Elected countywide officials
| Assessor | Jerome P. Overkamp | Republican |
| Circuit Clerk | Robyn R. Schmidt | Republican |
| County Clerk | Carole L Weeks | Republican |
| Collector | Anita L. Sullivan | Republican |
| Commissioner (presiding) | Ryan D. Poston | Republican |
| Commissioner (district 1) | Dave Teeter | Republican |
| Commissioner (district 2) | Doug Lensing | Republican |
| Coroner | David Colbert | Republican |
| Public Administrator | Kaley Reagan | Republican |
| Recorder | Sheila See | Republican |
| Sheriff | Craig Allison | Republican |
| Surveyor | Larry P. Bade | Republican |
| Treasurer | Lori Steirs | Republican |

=== State ===
Past gubernatorial elections results
| Year | Republican | Democratic | Third parties |
|---|---|---|---|
| 2024 | 79.41% 4,702 | 18.54% 1,098 | 2.05% 121 |
| 2020 | 76.81% 4,416 | 21.55% 1,239 | 1.64% 94 |
| 2016 | 60.31% 3,261 | 36.18% 1,956 | 3.51% 190 |
| 2012 | 53.49% 2,842 | 44.01% 2,338 | 2.50% 133 |
| 2008 | 55.34% 3,215 | 42.91% 2,493 | 1.76% 102 |
| 2004 | 60.60% 3,480 | 38.06% 2,186 | 1.34% 77 |
| 2000 | 54.14% 2,857 | 41.65% 2,198 | 4.20% 222 |
| 1996 | 42.23% 2,218 | 55.62% 2,921 | 2.15% 113 |

Montgomery County is part of Missouri's 42nd district in the Missouri House of Representatives and is represented by Bart Korman (R-High Hill).

Missouri House of Representatives — District 42 — Montgomery County (2016)
| Party | Candidate | Votes | % | ±% |
|---|---|---|---|---|
| Republican | Bart Korman | 4,802 | 100.00% | +28.72 |

Missouri House of Representatives — District 42 — Montgomery County (2014)
| Party | Candidate | Votes | % | ±% |
|---|---|---|---|---|
| Republican | Bart Korman | 2,316 | 71.28% | −28.72 |
| Democratic | Rod Sturgeon | 933 | 28.72% | +28.72 |

Missouri House of Representatives — District 42 — Montgomery County (2012)
| Party | Candidate | Votes | % | ±% |
|---|---|---|---|---|
| Republican | Bart Korman | 4,645 | 100.00% | |

Montgomery County is a part of Missouri's 10th District in the Missouri Senate and is currently represented by Jeanie Riddle (R-Fulton).

Missouri Senate — District 10 — Montgomery County (2014)
| Party | Candidate | Votes | % | ±% |
|---|---|---|---|---|
| Republican | Jeanie Riddle | 2,424 | 74.42% | |
| Democratic | Ed Schieffer | 833 | 25.58% | |

=== Federal ===
U.S. Senate — Missouri — Montgomery County (2016)
| Party | Candidate | Votes | % | ±% |
|---|---|---|---|---|
| Republican | Roy Blunt | 3,405 | 62.86% | +14.38 |
| Democratic | Jason Kander | 1,722 | 31.79% | −12.46 |
| Libertarian | Jonathan Dine | 128 | 2.36% | −4.91 |
| Green | Johnathan McFarland | 84 | 1.55% | +1.55 |
| Constitution | Fred Ryman | 78 | 1.44% | +1.44 |

U.S. Senate — Missouri — Montgomery County (2012)
| Party | Candidate | Votes | % | ±% |
|---|---|---|---|---|
| Republican | Todd Akin | 2,554 | 48.48% | |
| Democratic | Claire McCaskill | 2,331 | 44.25% | |
| Libertarian | Jonathan Dine | 383 | 7.27% | |

Montgomery County is included in Missouri's 3rd congressional district and is represented by Blaine Luetkemeyer (R-St. Elizabeth) in the U.S. House of Representatives.

U.S. House of Representatives — Missouri's 3rd Congressional District — Montgomery County (2016)
| Party | Candidate | Votes | % | ±% |
|---|---|---|---|---|
| Republican | Blaine Luetkemeyer | 4,080 | 76.43% | +1.37 |
| Democratic | Kevin Miller | 1,078 | 20.19% | −0.76 |
| Libertarian | Dan Hogan | 131 | 2.45% | −1.54 |
| Constitution | Doanita Simmons | 49 | 0.92% | +0.92 |

U.S. House of Representatives — Missouri’s 3rd Congressional District — Montgomery County (2014)
| Party | Candidate | Votes | % | ±% |
|---|---|---|---|---|
| Republican | Blaine Luetkemeyer | 2,426 | 75.06% | +3.41 |
| Democratic | Courtney Denton | 677 | 20.95% | −4.42 |
| Libertarian | Steven Hedrick | 129 | 3.99% | +1.01 |

U.S. House of Representatives — Missouri's 3rd Congressional District — Montgomery County (2012)
| Party | Candidate | Votes | % | ±% |
|---|---|---|---|---|
| Republican | Blaine Luetkemeyer | 3,727 | 71.65% | |
| Democratic | Eric Mayer | 1,320 | 25.37% | |
| Libertarian | Steven Wilson | 155 | 2.98% | |

United States presidential election results for Montgomery County, Missouri
| Year | Republican | | Democratic | | Third party(ies) | |
| Year | No. | % | No. | % | No. | % |
|---|---|---|---|---|---|---|
| 1888 | 1,905 | 48.20% | 1,989 | 50.33% | 58 | 1.47% |
| 1892 | 1,665 | 43.61% | 1,916 | 50.18% | 237 | 6.21% |
| 1896 | 1,920 | 45.13% | 2,272 | 53.41% | 62 | 1.46% |
| 1900 | 1,866 | 46.67% | 2,000 | 50.03% | 132 | 3.30% |
| 1904 | 1,979 | 48.40% | 1,986 | 48.57% | 124 | 3.03% |
| 1908 | 2,038 | 48.76% | 2,073 | 49.59% | 69 | 1.65% |
| 1912 | 1,697 | 43.75% | 1,883 | 48.54% | 299 | 7.71% |
| 1916 | 2,079 | 50.47% | 1,988 | 48.26% | 52 | 1.26% |
| 1920 | 3,910 | 55.16% | 3,103 | 43.78% | 75 | 1.06% |
| 1924 | 3,563 | 53.60% | 2,938 | 44.19% | 147 | 2.21% |
| 1928 | 3,910 | 63.03% | 2,285 | 36.84% | 8 | 0.13% |
| 1932 | 2,607 | 41.77% | 3,600 | 57.68% | 34 | 0.54% |
| 1936 | 3,468 | 49.99% | 3,458 | 49.85% | 11 | 0.16% |
| 1940 | 3,930 | 54.96% | 3,205 | 44.82% | 16 | 0.22% |
| 1944 | 3,527 | 56.20% | 2,743 | 43.71% | 6 | 0.10% |
| 1948 | 2,889 | 50.75% | 2,792 | 49.04% | 12 | 0.21% |
| 1952 | 3,670 | 56.37% | 2,835 | 43.55% | 5 | 0.08% |
| 1956 | 3,443 | 54.76% | 2,844 | 45.24% | 0 | 0.00% |
| 1960 | 3,454 | 55.19% | 2,804 | 44.81% | 0 | 0.00% |
| 1964 | 2,610 | 44.24% | 3,289 | 55.76% | 0 | 0.00% |
| 1968 | 2,903 | 53.59% | 1,891 | 34.91% | 623 | 11.50% |
| 1972 | 3,707 | 68.67% | 1,691 | 31.33% | 0 | 0.00% |
| 1976 | 2,665 | 50.83% | 2,535 | 48.35% | 43 | 0.82% |
| 1980 | 3,061 | 58.58% | 2,007 | 38.41% | 157 | 3.00% |
| 1984 | 3,261 | 66.16% | 1,668 | 33.84% | 0 | 0.00% |
| 1988 | 2,714 | 56.66% | 2,064 | 43.09% | 12 | 0.25% |
| 1992 | 1,974 | 37.11% | 2,063 | 38.79% | 1,282 | 24.10% |
| 1996 | 2,124 | 40.65% | 2,277 | 43.58% | 824 | 15.77% |
| 2000 | 3,106 | 58.57% | 2,092 | 39.45% | 105 | 1.98% |
| 2004 | 3,563 | 61.86% | 2,147 | 37.27% | 50 | 0.87% |
| 2008 | 3,428 | 58.54% | 2,347 | 40.08% | 81 | 1.38% |
| 2012 | 3,490 | 65.31% | 1,740 | 32.56% | 114 | 2.13% |
| 2016 | 4,127 | 76.02% | 1,119 | 20.61% | 183 | 3.37% |
| 2020 | 4,465 | 77.36% | 1,208 | 20.93% | 99 | 1.72% |
| 2024 | 4,776 | 79.63% | 1,170 | 19.51% | 52 | 0.87% |

== See also ==
- National Register of Historic Places listings in Montgomery County, Missouri
