= Luc Nam (disambiguation) =

Lục Nam may refer to:

- Lục Nam, Bắc Ninh, a ward of Bắc Ninh city
- Lục Nam River, a river in Northeast Vietnam, flowing through the province of Lạng Sơn and Bắc Giang.
- Lục Nam District, a former rural district of Bắc Giang Province, Vietnam.
