= Tornado outbreak sequence of March 9–13, 2006 =

Weather event sequence

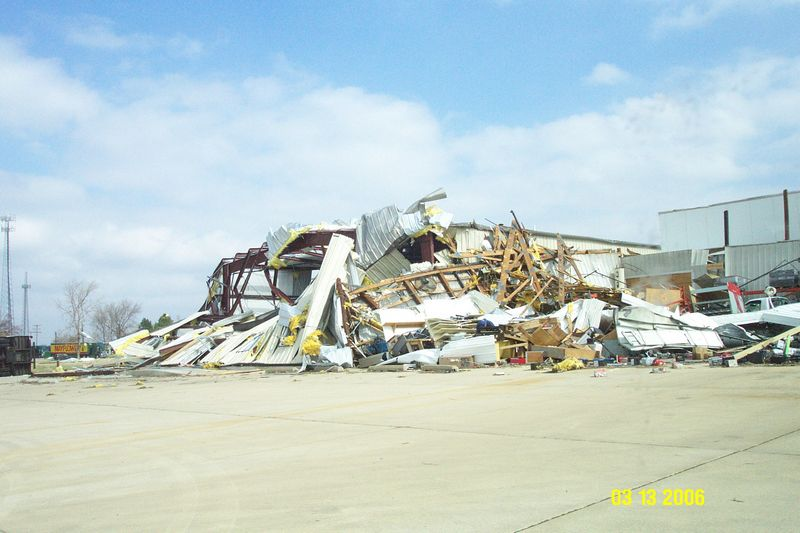
- Tornado damage in Springfield, Illinois

Meteorological history
- Duration: March 9–13, 2006

Tornado outbreak
- Tornadoes: 99 confirmed
- Max. rating: F4 tornado
- Duration: 4 days, 14 hours, 45 minutes

Overall effects
- Casualties: 10 fatalities (+2 non-tornadic), 183 injuries
- Damage: >$1 billion
- Areas affected: Midwestern and Southern United States

The Tornado outbreak sequence of March 9–13, 2006 was an early season and long lasting tornado outbreak sequence in the central United States that started on the morning of March 9 and continued for over four days until the evening of March 13. The outbreak produced 99 confirmed tornadoes, which killed a total of 10 people. The Storm Prediction Center (SPC) issued multiple elevated outlook throughout the sequence, including a rare high risk for March 12, which would end up being the most intense day of the outbreak, producing 62 in total. 11 F3 tornadoes were tallied, and a violent F4 tornado touched down in Monroe County, Missouri, becoming the strongest of the outbreak. Multiple tornado emergencies were issued for tornadoes throughout the outbreak as well. An intense F3 tornado that affected the towns of Renick and Maddison in Missouri killed 4 people and injured dozens others, becoming the deadliest of the sequence. Multiple of the tornadoes were long-tracked in nature, with 6 of them having paths exceeding 30 miles (48 km). One particular supercell thunderstorm during the outbreak persisted for many hours and progressed in excess of 800 miles (1,300 km) through Oklahoma, Kansas, Missouri, Illinois, Indiana, and extreme southern Michigan.

The onslaught of supercells responsible for the sequence also produced hundreds of damaging wind gust and hail accompanied the storms. These additional elements caused millions in damage and multiple injuries, in addition to two fatalities which were as a result of a weather-related automobile accident and a fire started by lightning. In addition to the tornadic fatalities, this sequence was responsible for 182 tornadic injuries, most of them concentrating in Missouri and Illinois, the hardest hit states by the outbreak. The total damage by the severe weather caused by this outbreak was in excess of $1 billion.

== Meteorological synopsis ==
=== March 9–11 ===
Beginning on March 9, the Storm Prediction Center (SPC) issued a moderate risk, spanning across northern and central portions of Dixie Alley, reaching into western Tennessee and western Kentucky. A slight risk was given to the surrounding area, reaching into the Ohio Valley, and to the east, including sections of north-central Georgia and the Florida Panhandle. While wind shear patterns and instability were conductive for the development of supercells and possibly strong tornadoes, the event was forecast to materialize as a major derecho event. Still, the elevated helicity values reaching 300 m^{2}/s^{2}, and elevated dew points reaching into the 60s, aided the issuance of a large 15%, hatched risk for strong/F2+ tornadoes throughout the moderate risk area. However, an even larger 45% hatched risk for damaging winds was placed throughout many of the same areas, forecasting the risk for the serial derecho to materialize. As the event unfolded, multiple tornadoes were reported, including a damaging F2 that caused significant damage in the Morton and Fair Oaks towns of Arkansas. However, the main event was a widespread derecho that prompted hundreds of severe damaging wind gusts throughout the main risk area. Tens of thousands of people also lost electricity throughout the region. Two non-tornadic deaths happened on March 9, one by damaging wind, and another that was killed after a lightning bolt ignited a house fire.

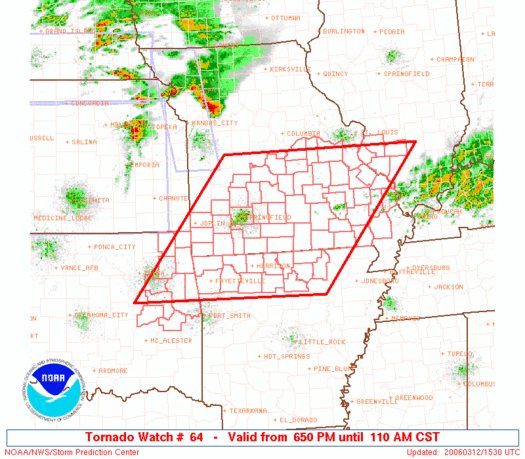
Tornado Watch 64, placed along a region which would soon experience multiple strong to intense tornadoes on March 11.

A slight risk was issued for many of the same areas on March 10, though only a 2% risk for tornadoes was issued, mostly in two corridors in the Ark-La-Tex region extending into Missouri, and another one mostly in Mississippi and west-central Alabama. The main risk was expected to be hail, and as the evening advanced, dozens of large hails reports came in from the aforementioned areas. However, no tornadoes touched down in this area, though one F0 did occur all the way in California, causing damage near the town of Encinitas in San Diego County.

A much more substantial tornado event materialized on March 11. The SPC again issued a moderate risk for severe weather, primarily driven by a 45% hatched risk for large, destructive hail, centered in Missouri and Arkansas, though it extended into extreme eastern Oklahoma and southwestern Illinois. However, elevated wind shear valued ranging from 50 to 70kt, and steep mid-level lapse rates meant the environment was favorable for supercells, so a 10%, hatched risk for strong tornadoes was introduced for the area, as any supercell that could remain discrete would be capable of sustaining and producing strong tornadoes. The most favorable window for severe weather was expected to be overnight in the 00z to 06z timeframe, meaning that any tornadoes that could develop would end up being difficult to see. As the night progressed, multiple supercells popped up in Oklahoma, eventually advancing throughout the risk area. Hundreds of damaging hail reports occurred on this area. However, as the supercells entered the more favorable environment for tornadoes, multiple of them became tornadic, resulting in multiple strong to intense tornadoes. One particular long-tracked supercell produced a tornado family in southeastern Missouri, which included a deadly F3 that killed two people in Perry County during its 53.5 mi (86.1 km) path, which crossed into Illinois, before dissipating near the town of Tamaroa. The supercell had produced a long-tracked, damaging F2 previous to this one, as it travelled through Reynolds, Iron, and Madison counties. Another supercell near this one produced another intense F3 in the town of Festus, Missouri, before crossing into Illinois. The tornadoes were accompanied by very large hail, some as large as softballs, before the day came to a close.

=== March 12–13 ===
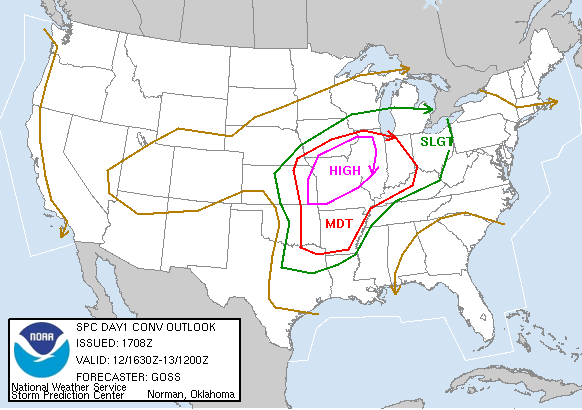

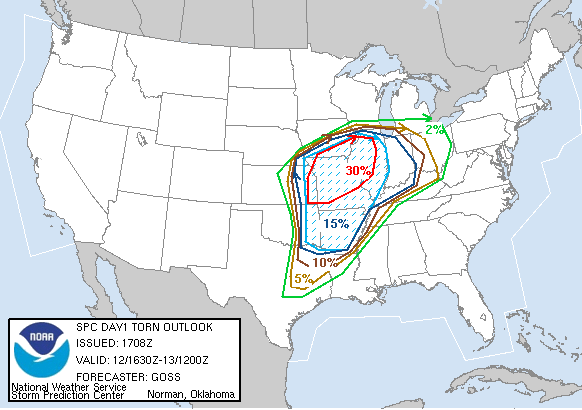
March 12, 1630UTC Convective Outlook (above), and respective tornado probability contour (below).

The next day, on March 12, conditions became even more favorable for the development of severe weather. The SPC, in its 1630 UTC outlook, introduced an incredibly rare high risk for many of the same areas from the day prior, with the main corridor being placed in eastern Kansas, most of Missouri, southeastern Iowa, and central Illinois. The high risk was driven by the elevated probabilities of long-tracked, strong to intense tornadoes, all along the main high risk corridor. A 30% hatched risk for F2+ tornadoes was given to this corridor as a result. A 45% hatched risk for large hail was also placed throughout the risk area, as any supercells capable of tornadoes would also produce large hail on their track. A potent upper-level trough, progressing along a strong 100-120 kt jet stream, in an area deepened by a progressing surface low in Oklahoma and Kansas, was the driving factor for the intense convective activity later in the evening/overnight hours. Additionally, sufficient moisture aided by dew points in the 60s, convective available potential energy (CAPE) values in the 1,500–3000 J/kg range, and very favorable low-level wind shear further destabilized the atmosphere, making it even more favorable for sustained supercells, capable of all hazards. However, a capping inversion in place for most of the day limited convective initiation at first, keeping all the necessary ingredients at bay. However, after the cap moved in the evening, multiple lines of powerful supercells began to form, soon entering the primed environment for tornadoes. As such, two PDS tornado watches were issued for most of the risk area, highlighting the elevated probabilities for intense tornadoes to develop in these areas. As the morning advanced, severe weather, spearheaded by severe wind, affected the Kansas City Metropolitan Area, with significant wind and hail damage to many homes and businesses, but only two tornadoes in the far northwestern part of the area. Significant damage was also reported at the University of Kansas in Lawrence and at the Great Wolf Lodge Indoor Water Park. Numerous airplanes also flipped over at the Kansas City Downtown Airport.

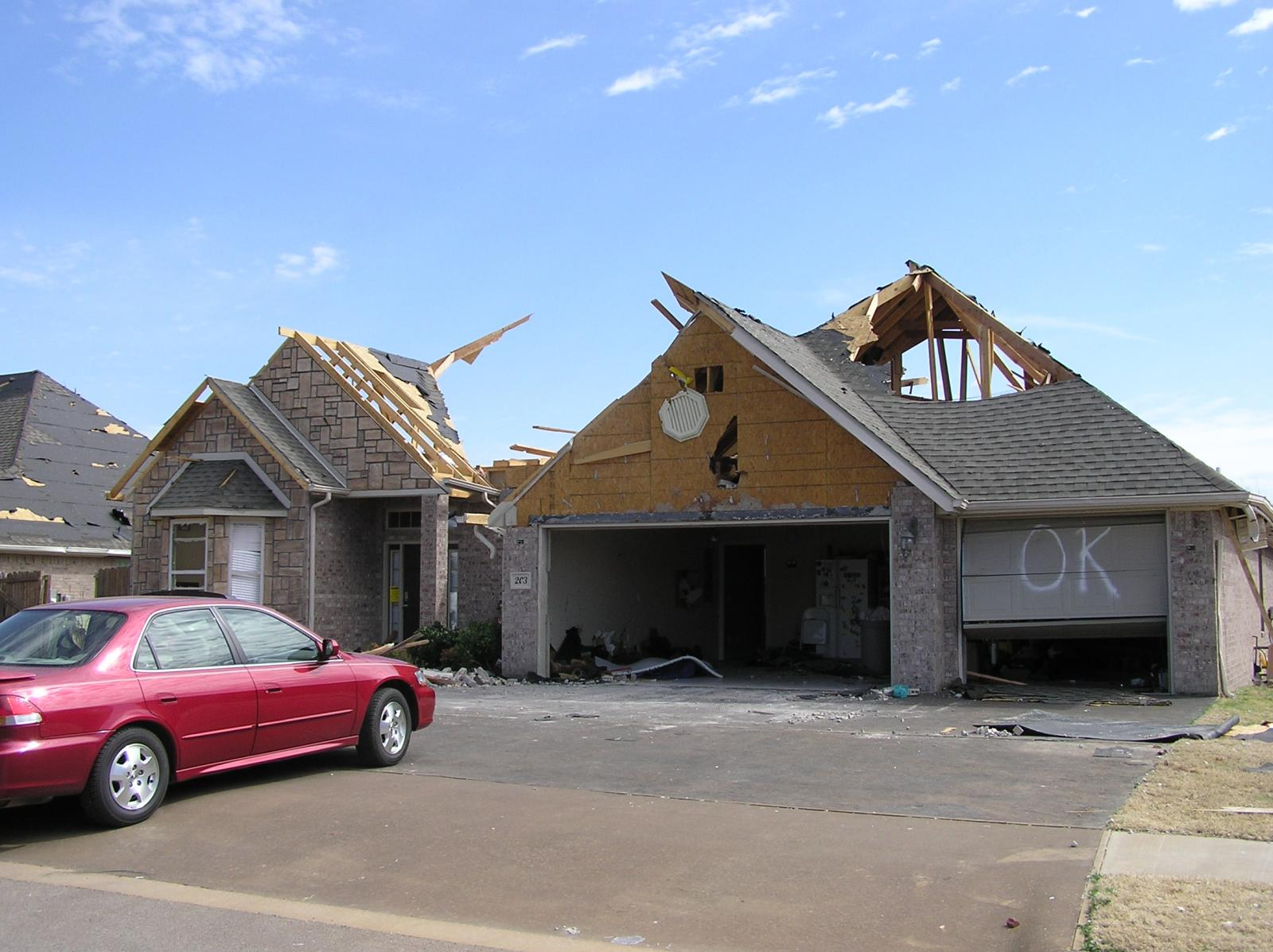
F2 tornado damage to a home in Bentonville, Arkansas.

As the evening advanced, the main line of supercells began to take shape, eventually becoming a widespread line, being responsible for many of the tornadoes throughout the remainder of the day. One exceptionally long-lived supercell thunderstorm was responsible for many of the tornadoes on March 12. This storm began in the morning over northern Oklahoma before embarking on a nearly 800 miles (1,300 km) journey northeast across southeastern Kansas, Missouri during the afternoon and early evening, into Illinois during the mid-to-late evening, through Indiana by the late evening, and into lower Michigan where it lost severe characteristics more than 17.5 hours after inception. This supercell lasted the longest and travelled the furthest than any other in history. The city of Springfield, Illinois saw two strong tornadoes track directly through the city from this storm. It also did damage near Sedalia, Columbia, and Mexico, Missouri. The deadliest tornado from this outbreak sequence came from another supercell; an F3 which killed 4 people near the town of Renick, Missouri. The strongest tornado, spawned by this same supercell, was a rare double tornado rated F4, but fortunately it remained over mainly rural countryside. Multiple other tornadoes came from this intense line, including multiple strong to intense tornadoes in the western region of the main risk area, in Oklahoma and Arkansas, where F3 tornadoes struck the towns of Twin Oaks, Oklahoma, and areas southwest of Bentonville, Arkansas. The storms progressed into the overnight hours and into early morning on March 13, before the main of storms finally came to an end.

A moderate risk for severe weather was issued by the SPC on March 13, as a severe damaging wind event was expected to materialize in the Ohio Valley area extending into the Great Lakes region. A 45% hatched risk for damaging wind gusts was issued for this whole area, with an accompanying 10% unhatched risk for tornadoes. A slight risk for severe weather, alongside a 5% chance for tornadoes extended into Mississippi, Alabama, and Tennessee. As the day progressed, the expected wind event did not materialize, though some weak tornadoes did occur in the southern regions of the risk area. Fifteen more tornadoes were reported on March 13 in Alabama and Mississippi before the system finally weakened and the severe weather came to an end.

== Confirmed tornadoes ==
Confirmed tornadoes by Fujita rating
FU	F0	F1	F2	F3	F4	F5	Total
0	45	26	16	11	1	0	99

=== March 9 event ===
List of confirmed tornadoes – Thursday, March 9, 2006 (Note: All dates are based on the local time zone where the tornado touched down; however, all times are in Coordinated Universal Time for consistency.)
EF#	Location	County / Parishes	State	Start Coord.	Time (UTC)	Path length	Max width	Summary
F0	S of Sedalia	Pettis	MO	38.6333°N 93.2333°W	06:19–06:22	1.3 mi (2.1 km)	50 yd (46 m)	Gustnado damaged a barn and snapped power poles.
F1	SE of Scott	Lonoke	AR	34.6502°N 92.0666°W	11:40–11:41	1 mi (1.6 km)	25 yd (23 m)	Tornado overturned a recreational vehicle and damaged roofs on several houses. A few fences were blown down, and some trees were uprooted.
F2	SW of Morton to NW of Fairoaks	Woodruff, Cross	AR	35.21°N 91.15°W	12:50–13:10	8 mi (13 km)	100 yd (91 m)	The tornado damaged 18 houses in Woodruff County. A large metal building housing a welding shop was destroyed. A church lost a large part of its roof with several windows blown out. A hunting lodge also suffered considerable roof damage. Several large grain bins were damaged, and a number of outbuildings were destroyed. In Cross County, the tornado heavily damaged 5 houses. One mobile home was displaced 100 feet from its foundation and damaged. A large metal storage shed was severely damaged with its roof removed and several large steel cross beams twisted. Several other outbuildings and barns were damaged. Many trees, power lines, and power poles were also blown down along the path.
F0	SW of Lockesburg	Sevier	AR	33.9521°N 94.1833°W	13:33–13:39	2 mi (3.2 km)	300 yd (270 m)	Damage was limited to a few broken or uprooted trees.
F1	Center Point to NE of Nathan	Howard, Pike	AR	33.9521°N 94.18333°W	13:55–14:10	15.10 mi (24.30 km)	300 yd (270 m)	A barn was destroyed, two houses sustained roof damage, and many trees were snapped and uprooted.
F1	SW of Kirby to SE of Glenwood	Pike	AR	34.2333°N 93.6333°W	14:14–14:28	8 mi (13 km)	50 yd (46 m)	This tornado touched down soon after the previous one dissipated. It damaged a backstop on the ball field and a barn at the Kirby School. Some roofs and other barns were damaged farther along the path, and many trees and power lines were downed.
F1	Sardis	Panola	MS	34.4166°N 89.9333°W	19:00–19:05	1 mi (1.6 km)	200 yd (180 m)	Tornado touched down near downtown Sardis and moved northeast. Five houses were totally destroyed. Several businesses and fifteen other houses were damaged. Many trees and power lines were knocked down.
F0	NW of Liberty	Amite	MS	31.2333°N 90.91667°W	21:05	0.1 mi (0.16 km)	25 yd (23 m)	Brief tornado touchdown, no damage reported.
F1	Dexter	Stoddard	MO	36.8018°N 89.9666°W	23:44–23:47	1.2 mi (1.9 km)	175 yd (160 m)	A Walmart sustained significant damage to its roof and auto shop bay doors, and light standards were pulled out. At a car dealership, about 50 cars were damaged, their windows broken by wind-blown debris. At a mobile home dealership was toppled, and a church lost its steeple and sections of roof. A second church near Highway 60 sustained damage, and a restaurant next to the church sustained structural damage when the upper portion of a wall was blown in. Two residences received moderate damage, and a heavy equipment shed was blown down. A motel reported that eight units lost parts of their roofs. Several billboards on Highway 60 were heavily damaged, and a utility pole was snapped off as well.

=== March 10 event ===
List of confirmed tornadoes – Friday, March 10, 2006
EF#	Location	County / Parishes	State	Start Coord.	Time (UTC)	Path length	Max width	Summary
F0	Encinitas area	San Diego	CA	33.05°N 117.31°W	23:38–23:40	0.2 mi (0.32 km)	25 yd (23 m)	A waterspout briefly came on shore in Encinitas, resulting in some light damage.

=== March 11 event ===
List of confirmed tornadoes Saturday, March 11, 2006
EF#	Location	County / Parishes	State	Start Coord.	Time (UTC)	Path length	Max width	Summary
F1	NW of Shady Point	Le Flore	OK	35.15°N 94.68°W	06:12–06:14	1.5 mi (2.4 km)	100 yd (91 m)	This tornado was embedded in a bow-echo. It destroyed sheds, outbuildings, and two chicken houses; severely damaged several houses; snapped and uprooted a number of trees; and blew down power lines and poles.
F0	NW of Ramona	San Diego	CA	33.12°N 116.93°W	07:12–07:15	2 mi (3.2 km)	45 yd (41 m)	Dozens of trees were snapped or uprooted, metal roofing was peeled of a farm, and solar panels were damaged by this tornado.
F0	SW of Branson	Taney	MO	36.63°N 93.25°W	22:35–22:58	8 mi (13 km)	20 yd (18 m)	Damage was limited to trees and power poles.
F0	E of Independence	Pike	IL	39.53°N 90.76°W	23:15–23:16	0.1 mi (0.16 km)	40 yd (37 m)	Damage was minimal and limited to a few trees.
F0	Milton	Pike	IL	39.56°N 90.65°W	23:20–23:21	0.1 mi (0.16 km)	50 yd (46 m)	Two garage doors and an awning were damaged at a house. Many tree limbs were downed in town as well.
F0	N of Vanzant	Douglass	MO	37.0166°N 92.3166°W	23:50–23:51	0.1 mi (0.16 km)	20 yd (18 m)	A mobile home was flipped over.
F0	SE of Rolla	Phelps	MO	37.85°N 91.81°W	01:50–01:56	3 mi (4.8 km)	25 yd (23 m)	Minor tree damage occurred.
F2	S of Centerville to NW of Silver Mine	Reynolds, Iron, Madison	MO	37.35°N 90.96°W	01:55–02:48	35.5 mi (57.1 km)	450 yd (410 m)	This long-tracked tornado began in Reynolds County, where trees were snapped and uprooted. In Iron County, the tornado flattened a quarter-mile wide swath of trees in the Mark Twain National Forest. A house and a barn in this area sustained roof and siding damage. Additional trees were downed in Madison County before the tornado dissipated.
F1	E of Oak Grove	Madison	MO	37.5666°N 90.3833°W	02:48–02:50	0.7 mi (1.1 km)	75 yd (69 m)	This tornado formed almost immediately as the previous one dissipated. Some trees were snapped and uprooted.
F1	SW of Mine La Motte to NE of Womack	Madison, St. Francois, St. Genevieve	MO	37.61°N 90.31°W	02:54–03:13	11 mi (18 km)	300 yd (270 m)	A mobile home was destroyed, barns and outbuildings were damaged or destroyed, and many trees were downed along the path.
F3	NE of Womack, MO to N of Chester, IL to NW of Tamaroa, IL	Ste. Genevieve (MO), Perry (MO), Randolph (IL), Perry (IL)	MO, IL	37.75°N 90.11°W	03:20–04:43	53.5 mi (86.1 km)	400 yd (370 m)	2 deaths – This large, strong, long-tracked tornado destroyed three mobile homes, two barns, a machine shed, and a garage in the town of Womack. Two people were killed in Perry County when the truck they were driving was picked up and thrown into a large propane tank. Three mobile homes were flattened, a brick house had its roof and several walls blown off, and numerous vehicles were tossed around in this area. Several people were injured when they were thrown roughly 100 yards from their residences. The tornado passed just north of Chester, where it downed trees, damaged a recreational complex, and destroyed some outbuildings. Metal high-tension towers were downed, and a mobile home and several outbuildings were destroyed near Bremen. Garages were destroyed, and a house sustained considerable structural damage near Steeleville. Farther along the track, some coal trucks were blown over, hogs were killed at a farm, and a modular home was totally destroyed near Pinckneyville. A house in Tamaroa had some shingles torn off, and a number of outbuildings were damaged nearby before the tornado dissipated. Extensive tree and power line damage occurred along much of the path, and a total of 14 people were injured.
F0	SE of Festus	Jefferson	MO	38.11°N 90.42°W	03:40–03:41	0.1 mi (0.16 km)	10 yd (9.1 m)	Damage limited to a few trees along the very short and narrow path.
F3	SE of Festus, MO to Fults, IL	Jefferson (MO), Monroe (IL)	MO, IL	38.1166°N 90.3333°W	03:42–03:50	5.1 mi (8.2 km)	200 yd (180 m)	This intense tornado snapped trees and destroyed four houses near Festus. Other houses and outbuildings in the area suffered minor or moderate damage, and two metal high-tension towers were blown down. In Fults, trees were snapped, sheds were destroyed, and houses and businesses both sustained roof damage.
F0	Ozark area	Franklin	AR	35.51°N 94.05°W	03:44	0.1 mi (0.16 km)	40 yd (37 m)	Brief tornado, no damage reported.
F1	SW of Fults	Monroe	IL	38.15°N 90.25°W	03:46–03:50	2.4 mi (3.9 km)	100 yd (91 m)	This tornado occurred simultaneously with the Festus F3. It caused damage to multiple homes and the postal office, and two sheds were also destroyed.
F1	SSW of Keenes	Wayne	IL	38.28°N 88.65°W	05:26–05:30	1 mi (1.6 km)	600 yd (550 m)	An old schoolhouse was destroyed when a large tree fell on it, and numerous other very large trees were uprooted and snapped. Boards were impaled into the ground, and one house sustained extensive roof damage. Two barns were destroyed, several other barns were damaged, and one calf was injured. The tornado also left "swirl marks" in farm fields.
F1	SE of Evening Star	Searcy	AR	36.0166°N 92.5333°W	05:50–05:51	0.8 mi (1.3 km)	25 yd (23 m)	Tornado overturned a travel trailer and a lawn tractor. Tin was also removed from the roofs of two barns, and a few trees were downed as well. Damage was limited mostly to hilltops.

=== March 12 event ===
List of confirmed tornadoes Sunday, March 12, 2006
EF#	Location	County / Parishes	State	Start Coord.	Time (UTC)	Path length	Max width	Summary
F0	SW of Byron	Fulton	AR	36.31°N 91.96°W	06:41–06:43	1.5 mi (2.4 km)	25 yd (23 m)	Damage limited to some trees that were snapped and uprooted.
F0	SW of Boaz	Massac	IL	37.32°N 88.91°W	11:31–11:34	0.9 mi (1.4 km)	50 yd (46 m)	Tornado developed at the end of a path of wind damage. Dozens of trees were snapped or uprooted. Two barns were destroyed, and a side wall of a third barn was blown out. Power poles were snapped or blown down along Highway 169. A mobile home near Boaz was unroofed and severely damaged.
F0	E of Linwood	Leavenworth	KS	39.04°N 95.01°W	14:20–14:22	1 mi (1.6 km)	50 yd (46 m)	Minor structural damage was noted at several residences and outbuildings. Gravel was blown off a road surface, and corn stalks reportedly fell out of the sky following the tornado.
F1	NW of Sibley to SE of Richmond	Jackson, Ray	MO	39.05°N 94.51°W	15:12–15:35	17 mi (27 km)	150 yd (140 m)	Tornado first downed trees and power lines near Sibley before striking Orrick, Missouri; when the tornado hit, a gas station was destroyed and the roof was blown off a school.
F0	Norborne to E of Carrollton	Carroll	MO	39.31°N 93.68°W	15:44–16:05	9.6 mi (15.4 km)	100 yd (91 m)	Minor damage to buildings, trees, and power lines. This tornado came from the same supercell that produced the tornado that struck Orrick.
F0	NW of Huntsville to SSE of Cairo	Randolph	MO	39.4666°N 92.5666°W	16:46–16:55	10.5 mi (16.9 km)	75 yd (69 m)	Tornado remained in rural areas with no significant damage.
F0	N of Madison	Monroe	MO	39.52°N 92.21°W	16:57–16:58	0.1 mi (0.16 km)	50 yd (46 m)	Brief tornado touchdown with damage limited to a few trees.
F0	S of Hassard	Ralls	MO	39.63°N 91.66°W	17:25–17:26	0.2 mi (0.32 km)	50 yd (46 m)	Brief tornado in an open field and was seen sucking water out of a pond. One outbuilding was damaged.
F0	SE of La Cygne, KS to NW of Adrian, MO	Linn (KS), Bates (MO)	KS, MO	38.31°N 94.65°W	20:20–20:42	16.40 mi (26.39 km)	220 yd (200 m)	Unusually long-tracked weak tornado. Damage in Kansas was limited to trees; however, several buildings were damaged when the tornado struck the town of Amsterdam, Missouri.
F0	NE of La Monte to NE of Blackwater	Pettis, Cooper	MO	38.8166°N 93.3833°W	21:50–22:17	28 mi (45 km)	220 yd (200 m)	Unusually long-tracked, fast-moving tornado weak damaged trees near La Monte and flipped a tractor trailer on I-70 near Blackwater.
F1	E of Calhoun to W of Manila	Henry, Benton, Pettis	MO	38.48°N 93.62°W	21:50–22:04	13 mi (21 km)	150 yd (140 m)	Initially traversing over rural areas, this tornado damaged houses and barns, while also snapping power poles in Benton County.
F2	E of Green Ridge to SW of Smithton	Pettis	MO	38.61°N 93.28°W	22:12–22:25	11.20 mi (18.02 km)	500 yd (460 m)	1 death – This large tornado touched down east of Green Ridge, eventually moving into areas south of the city of Sedalia. Numerous houses sustained varying degrees of damage, and a woman was crushed to death by her own trailer. Six other people were injured, before the tornado dissipated southwest of Smithton.
F1	W of Syracuse	Morgan	MO	38.66°N 93.05°W	22:25–22:27	1 mi (1.6 km)	250 yd (230 m)	One house and several trees were damaged.
F0	W of Otterville	Cooper	MO	38.7166°N 93.0333°W	22:30–22:31	1 mi (1.6 km)	75 yd (69 m)	Brief tornado caused some tree damage.
F0	SW of Fayette	Howard	MO	39.0833°N 92.7833°W	22:33–22:37	3 mi (4.8 km)	75 yd (69 m)	No damage reported. Tornado remained in rural areas.
F0	SW of Molino	Audrain	MO	39.25°N 91.95°W	23:25–23:35	6 mi (9.7 km)	75 yd (69 m)	Tornado damaged a barn, a grain bin, and some outbuildings.
F0	W of New Hartford	Pike	MO	39.2166°N 91.2833°W	00:24–00:25	1 mi (1.6 km)	50 yd (46 m)	Damage was limited to a few snapped trees along the path.
F1	W of Ashley	Pike	MO	39.2166°N 91.2833°W	00:25–00:33	5 mi (8.0 km)	125 yd (114 m)	Tornado impacted several farms, damaging or destroying grain bins and outbuildings. Trees were downed as well.
F2	NW of Kampsville to S of Murrayville to Springfield	Calhoun, Pike, Greene, Scott, Morgan, Sangamon	IL	39.35°N 90.68°W	01:04–02:25	67.00 mi (107.83 km)	880 yd (800 m)	This strong, long-tracked tornado damaged outbuildings and downed trees near Kampsville before crossing into Pike County, where additional tree damage occurred and a barn was damaged. Then, the tornado crossed into Greene County and struck the town of Hillview, where homes and a brick building sustained minor damage. Several large limbs and a few large trees were also downed there. The neighboring town of Patterson was also hit, where number of homes sustained varying degrees of damage and one house trailer was severely damaged. Several farms near Hillview and Patterson were damaged as well, some heavily. The tornado continued through Scott and Morgan counties, where farms, trees, and power lines were damaged and one person was injured. Before dissipating, the tornado struck the city of Springfield, where many homes, industrial buildings, and businesses were severely damaged; extensive tree and power line damage also occurred; and 20 people were injured, 19 of them in Sangamon County alone.
F1	Barrow	Greene	IL	39.4833°N 90.4333°W	01:20–01:25	3.5 mi (5.6 km)	100 yd (91 m)	Tornado struck Barrow, destroying two house trailers and damaging a number of homes in town. A few grain bins and machine sheds were damaged outside of town as well, and two people were injured. This tornado occurred simultaneously with the long-tracked F2 that struck Springfield.
F1	NW of Barrow to E of Murrayville	Greene, Scott, Morgan	IL	39.52°N 90.41°W	01:25–01:40	11.8 mi (19.0 km)	75 yd (69 m)	This tornado formed immediately as the previous one dissipated. A farmhouse sustained minor damage and two machine sheds were destroyed in Greene County. Three other machine sheds were destroyed elsewhere along the tornado’s track. This tornado was also produced by the Springfield supercell.
F0	N of Monserrat to SW of Houstonia	Johnson, Pettis	MO	38.81°N 93.63°W	01:51–02:04	8.8 mi (14.2 km)	100 yd (91 m)	Damage was minimal as this tornado crossed through open farmland.
F2	Butler to SSE of Blairstown	Bates, Cass, Henry	MO	38.25°N 94.33°W	01:52–02:25	26 mi (42 km)	450 yd (410 m)	1 death – Damage in Bates County was limited to trees, power lines, and a barn, before crossing into Cass County, where several structures sustained F1 damage near the town of Creighton. The tornado crossed into Henry County, One person was killed when their house was destroyed by the tornado near Urich. Thirteen people reported injuries.
F1	SW of Franklin to NW of Loami	Morgan, Sangamon	IL	39.52°N 90.41°W	01:58–02:11	12.2 mi (19.6 km)	440 yd (400 m)	Several farm buildings, trees, and power lines were damaged by this large tornado.
F2	NW of Houstonia to NE of Marshall	Pettis, Saline	MO	38.933°N 93.45°W	02:07–02:35	20.00 mi (32.19 km)	150 yd (140 m)	After touching down without much damage in Pettis County, the tornado moved into Saline County, were the brunt of the damage occurred. Numerous roofs were removed from houses, a church was destroyed, and many cars were flipped on I-70 in the city of Marshall as the tornado passed by. Two of the six injuries occurred when a semi-truck crashed into two vehicles underneath an overpass.
F2	Springfield	Sangamon	IL	39.81°N 89.65°W	02:24–02:30	4 mi (6.4 km)	400 yd (370 m)	After the first, long-tracked tornado dissipated, a second F2 developed in and directly struck Springfield, and several houses had their roofs torn off. There was also extensive damage to power poles and lines, along with numerous downed trees.
F3	S of Marshall to S of Glasgow to SSE of Armstrong	Saline, Howard	MO	39.05°N 93.21°W	02:28–03:02	35.00 mi (56.33 km)	350 yd (320 m)	This large, intense, fast-moving, tornado developed while the previous F2 affected the city of Marshall, intensifying as that tornado occluded. While this tornado remained relatively weak in Saline County, it gradually intensified after absorbing a smaller F0 that developed to its southeast (see 02:38 UTC event for that tornado. After destroying a farmstead in Saline County, F3 damage occurred to several farmsteads in Howard County before the tornado dissipated. Despite its long-track, no injuries or fatalities were reported.
F2	S of Riverton to NE of Buffalo	Sangamon	IL	39.81°N 89.53°W	02:32–02:55	12.5 mi (20.1 km)	200 yd (180 m)	Houses and barns were severely damaged, and power poles were snapped across the path. Major tree damage occurred as it passed near the towns of Dawson and Buffalo, before dissipating just before crossing into Logan County. Four people were injured.
F0	NW of Nelson	Saline	MO	39.05°N 93.08°W	02:38–02:45	6.4 mi (10.3 km)	100 yd (91 m)	This tornado was eventually absorbed by the larger F3 Marshall-Armstrong tornado, making it stronger as it crossed from Saline into Howard County. By itself, this tornado did not produce damage.
F2	NE of Leeton to SW of La Monte	Johnson, Pettis	MO	38.61°N 93.66°W	02:40–03:00	12.8 mi (20.6 km)	200 yd (180 m)	Several houses suffered significant damage along the path. Four people sustained injuries.
F2	E of Sheldon to SW of El Dorado Springs to SE of Vista	Vernon, Cedar, St. Clair	MO	37.66°N 94.25°W	02:47–03:29	38.00 mi (61.16 km)	300 yd (270 m)	1 death – A church and six houses were destroyed near Virgil City. A total of 47 structures - both homes and businesses - were damaged, and 26 others were destroyed near El Dorado Springs in Cedar County. In St. Clair County, four structures were damaged, and a house was destroyed. Trees and power lines were downed as well. A Cedar County man was killed by flying debris while inside his home, and seven other people reported injuries.
F2	E of Cornland to SW of Mount Pulaski	Logan	IL	39.9333°N 89.3166°W	02:57–02:59	2.5 mi (4.0 km)	400 yd (370 m)	A north moving tornado, it snapped numerous trees and power poles, and a 400-foot microwave tower was toppled. This tornado came from the same tornado family that produced the long-tracked Springfield F2.
F2	S of Mount Pulaski	Logan	IL	39.9333°N 89.2833°W	03:00–03:02	3.5 mi (5.6 km)	200 yd (180 m)	Tornado damaged houses, snapped trees and power poles, and toppled several large steel power poles.
F0	SW of Arbela to W of Luray	Scotland, Clark	MO	40.45°N 92.05°W	03:02–03:09	6 mi (9.7 km)	80 yd (73 m)	This high-end F0 tornado damaged the roof of a farmhouse, along with some trees.
F1	SW of Latham to SW of Maroa	Logan, Macon	IL	39.91°N 89.25°W	03:03–03:15	10 mi (16 km)	400 yd (370 m)	Numerous trees were blown down, and several outbuildings were damaged or destroyed.
F3	N of Peggs to Twin Oaks to NE of Colcord	Cherokee, Delaware	OK	35.9166°N 94.6166°W	03:09–03:42	29.00 mi (46.67 km)	440 yd (400 m)	In Cherokee County, several houses received minor damage, outbuildings were destroyed, power lines were downed, and numerous trees were snapped or uprooted. In Delaware County, the worst damage occurred near Twin Oaks, where 42 houses were destroyed, 53 others were damaged, five businesses were damaged, and many trees and power lines were downed. A total of eight people were injured.
F1	NW of Latham to SW of Maroa	Macon, De Witt	IL	39.9333°N 89.0666°W	03:16–03:25	18.00 mi (28.97 km)	600 yd (550 m)	Tornado blew down numerous trees and damaged several outbuildings.
F0	Boston to Stockton Lake to SE of Weaubleau	Barton, Dade, Cedar, Polk, Hickory	MO	37.41°N 94.31°W	03:18–04:23	57.00 mi (91.73 km)	50 yd (46 m)	Long-tracked, but weak and intermittent tornado caused only tree damage. It became a waterspout for a period of time as it crossed Stockton Lake. The same supercell would restrengthen as this tornado occluded, eventually producing and intense F3 that caused severe damage near Carsons Corner. It is one of the longest tracked F0 tornadoes in the modern NEXRAD era.
F3	E of Higbee to SE of Madison	Randolph, Monroe	MO	39.3166°N 92.4833°W	03:18–03:43	19.7 mi (31.7 km)	300 yd (270 m)	4 deaths – This was the deadliest tornado from the entire outbreak sequence. Near the Monroe-Randolph County line, the tornado attained F3 strength, destroying about 30 houses and three businesses, and 30 additional structures were damaged near the town of Renick, were the 4 deaths occurred. 2 of them occurred on mobile homes, while an elderly couple was killed in the destruction of their home. There were a total of 26 people were injured in Renick, including 13 college students when their bus was flipped by the tornado. After crossing into Monroe County, the tornado damaged farms and trees. A mobile home was destroyed south of Madison, earning an F2 rating in this area, before the tornado dissipated. A total of 26 people were injured.
F1	NW of Goodman to W of Neosho	Newton	MO	36.7833°N 94.4666°W	03:25–03:35	7 mi (11 km)	75 yd (69 m)	Damaged 40 structures across rural sections of the county. The tornado also struck a turkey farm killing around 200 turkeys prior to lifting. One person was injured.
F0	Neosho	Newton	MO	36.86°N 94.36°W	03:36	0.1 mi (0.16 km)	15 yd (14 m)	Brief tornado touchdown in a neighborhood heavily damaged the roof of a house.
F3	SE of Colcord, OK to SW of Bentonville, AR	Delaware (OK), Benton (AR)	OK, AR	35.51°N 94.91°W	03:37–04:08	26.00 mi (41.84 km)	700 yd (640 m)	In Oklahoma, the tornado damaged houses, destroyed outbuildings and chicken houses, snapped or uprooted numerous trees, and downed power poles. The tornado crossed into Arkansas, where a mobile home was destroyed, a pickup truck was rolled and also destroyed, and several houses sustained major roof damage near Bloomfield. Major damage occurred near Gentry and Centerton, where 75 houses were damaged or destroyed. A total of 12 people were injured by this tornado.
F4	SE of Madison to Monroe City	Monroe	MO	39.45°N 92.18°W	03:43–04:20	29.00 mi (46.67 km)	500 yd (460 m)	See section on this tornado – This tornado crossed almost the entirety of Monroe County. Soon after touching down, the tornado demolished two well-built houses, leveling one, near the town of Paris, garnering an F4 rating. Some farm buildings were also damaged or destroyed in rural areas of Monroe County. A pickup truck was thrown 100 yards into the living room of a house that only had one wall left standing. Debris from the leveled house was found a half-mile away. The tornado continued east, destroying two mobile homes and damaging two houses. Numerous trees were snapped in this area. At one point, the circulation split in two, and a double funnel/damage path was observed. The tornado destroyed several mobile homes on the west side of Monroe City. A church sustained considerable roof and wall damage, and other buildings suffered roof damage as well. Despite the extent of the damage, no injuries or fatalities were reported.
F2	Bentonville	Benton	AR	36.48°N 93.61°W	04:11–04:20	8 mi (13 km)	250 yd (230 m)	At least 125 houses were damaged or destroyed in Bentonville. No injuries or fatalities occurred. This tornado was the last to be produced by the long-tracked Oklahoma-Arkansas supercell, which produced two F3's prior.
F3	N of Verona to Battlefield	Lawrence, Christian, Greene	MO	36.98°N 93.81°W	04:15–05:00	42.00 mi (67.59 km)	250 yd (230 m)	1 death – Large tornado touched down near Verona, destroying 21 structures and damaging 46 in that area. The lone fatality occurred north of the town of Marionville, where a fram home was completely destroyed, killing its occupant. In Christian County, major structural damage occurred, mainly in a subdivision near Nixa where 138 structures were damaged, and 127 structures were destroyed in that area. The tornado weakened to F2 strength as it entered the southern suburban areas of Springfield, where 27 houses were damaged before the tornado dissipated. Eight people were injured. Tornado followed a path similar to that of another F3 that occurred on May 4, 2003.
F3	NE of Flemington to Carsons Corner to NE of Preston	Hickory	MO	37.85°N 93.43°W	04:17–04:37	17.00 mi (27.36 km)	200 yd (180 m)	Heavy damage occurred in the small community of Carsons Corner in Hickory County. At least 20 houses, a church, many boats and outbuildings, and several businesses were destroyed. A golf course sustained severe damage as well. At least 19 people reported injuries. This tornado formed soon after the long-tracked F0 dissipated.
F2	Gravois Mills	Morgan	MO	38.28°N 92.85°W	10:25-10:35pm	6 mi (9.7 km)	660 yd (600 m)	Tornado tracked directly though town. At least 20 houses were destroyed, and ten others were damaged. Five people were injured.
F1	NW of Urbanette, AR to SSW of Kimberling City, MO	Carroll (AR), Stone (MO)	AR, MO	36.33°N 94.45°W	04:50–05:02	8 mi (13 km)	200 yd (180 m)	Knocked down many trees in rural areas, and damage to buildings was minor.
F0	SE of Elliot	Ford	IL	40.45°N 88.25°W	04:56–05:00	2 mi (3.2 km)	30 yd (27 m)	Tornado damaged several outbuildings and scattered debris across a field.
F2	NW of Fordland to N of Diggins	Webster	MO	37.22°N 93.01°W	05:03–05:13	7 mi (11 km)	150 yd (140 m)	Multiple houses and barns were damaged or destroyed. Thirteen people were injured, including a teenager who was thrown 1,307 feet from his trailer home.
F3	N of Diggins to NE of Competition	Webster, Wright, Laclede	MO	37.22°N 93.01°W	05:15–05:49	32.00 mi (51.50 km)	200 yd (180 m)	Large wedge tornado caused major structural damage in Webster County before crossing into Wright County, where 23 structures were damaged and six others were destroyed. In Laclede County, six houses sustained damage before the tornado dissipated.
F0	NW of Cole Camp	Benton	MO	38.46°N 93.23°W	05:25–05:29	3 mi (4.8 km)	30 yd (27 m)	Some barns and outbuildings were damaged.
F1	SW of Tebbetts to E of Portland	Callaway, Osage	MO	38.61°N 91.98°W	05:30–05:43	13.5 mi (21.7 km)	150 yd (140 m)	A mobile home was flipped on its side near Tebbetts. Near Chamois, barns were damaged and sheds were destroyed, scattering debris up 500 yards away. Trees were downed as well.
F0	NW of Florence	Morgan	MO	38.58°N 93.08°W	05:31–05:37	6 mi (9.7 km)	100 yd (91 m)	Only minor tree damage was reported.
F0	NE of Chamois to N of Bluffton	Osage, Callaway, Montgomery	MO	38.58°N 93.08°W	05:43–05:50	6.7 mi (10.8 km)	100 yd (91 m)	Damage was limited to trees, power lines, and a few outbuildings.

=== March 13 event ===
List of confirmed tornadoes – Monday, March 13, 2006
F#	Location	County	State	Time (UTC)	Path length	Damage
F3	Jonesburg to NW of Warrenton	Montgomery, Warren	MO	0600	6 mi (9.66 km)	One person was injured in Jonesburg where portable toilet business sustained roof damage, and the CC Pallet company was destroyed. In addition, two mobile homes were destroyed, another mobile home and a tractor trailer were flipped, and a number of houses in the area sustained roof damage. Some barns, outbuildings, and a house were destroyed; and severe tree damage also occurred in areas east of Jonesburg. Damage in Warren County was limited to trees.
F2	NE of Guthrie to E of Fulton	Callaway	MO	0630	13 mi (20.92 km)	Near the beginning of the path, a house was pushed 25 feet off its foundation, injuring the two occupants. Another nearby house sustained roof damage. Barns and outbuildings were damaged near Fulton, and extensive tree damage occurred along the path.
F3	N of Bellflower to NE of Annada	Montgomery (MO), Lincoln (MO), Pike (MO), Calhoun (IL)	MO, IL	0720	37 mi (59.55 km)	This strong, long-tracked tornado damaged a house before entering the town of Gamma where it destroyed a barn and several outbuildings and damaged the roofs on a couple of houses. In Lincoln County, the tornado strengthened and destroyed a house north of Olney then damaged a house and machine shed and flipped a truck and travel trailer north of Silex. Farther east, an old barn and metal shed were destroyed, several farms and houses sustained minor damage, and a garage had its door buckled and windows blown out. After also causing extensive tree damage along much of the path and injuring six people, the tornado finally dissipated after crossing into Illinois.
F1	E of Millwood	Lincoln	MO	0736	unknown	A barn and two grain bins were destroyed, and other buildings had roof damage.
F0	NE of Winona	Montgomery	MS	1950	1.5 mi (2.41 km)	Damage limited to some downed trees.
F0	NW of Walthall	Webster	MS	2018	unknown	Brief tornado caused no damage.
F0	N of Clarkston	Webster	MS	2026	unknown	Tornado downed trees and damaged the roof of a house.
F0	NW of West Point	Clay	MS	2140	unknown	Tornado remained over open country, no damage reported.
F0	SW of Sulligent	Lamar	AL	2206	0.25 mi (402.34 m)	Two barns sustained roof damage.
F0	N of Fayette	Fayette	AL	2245	1 mi (1.61 km)	One mobile home was destroyed, and trees were downed.
F1	E of Winfield	Fayette	AL	2254	1.5 mi (2.41 km)	Numerous trees were uprooted, but no structures were damaged.
F0	S of Kennedy	Lamar	AL	2315	3 mi (4.83 km)	Mobile homes were damaged, and many trees were downed.
F1	NE of Jasper	Walker	AL	2336	0.2 mi (321.87 m)	Numerous trees were blown down on the south shore of Lewis Smith Lake. One barn suffered heavy damage, and another one was completely destroyed.
F0	NW of Samantha to SE of Newtonville	Tuscaloosa, Fayette	AL	2343	3.4 mi (5.47 km)	Damage was limited to broken tree limbs.
F0	NE of Arkadelphia to NW of Hayden	Cullman, Blount	AL	2354	2 mi (3.22 km)	Minor damage to trees and a mobile home.
F0	N of Samantha	Tuscaloosa	AL	2354	0.1 mi (160.93 m)	Brief tornado, little or no damage reported.
F0	SW of Hanceville (1st tornado)	Cullman	AL	0045	unknown	Trees were downed.
F0	SW of Hanceville (2nd tornado)	Cullman	AL	0047	unknown	Trees were downed.
F0	SW of Hanceville (3rd tornado)	Cullman	AL	0045	unknown	Trees were downed.
Sources: Storm Reports 03/13, Birmingham office, Huntsville office, Sam's Weather, National Climatic Data Center

=== Paris–Madison–Monroe City, Missouri ===
Paris–Madison–Monroe City, Missouri
Meteorological history
- Date: March 12, 2006

F4 tornado
- on the Fujita scale

Overall effects
- Casualties: 0
- Injuries: 0
- Damage: $1 billion (2006 USD)

The strongest tornado of the outbreak would touchdown southeast of Monroe City, and traveled northeast, parallel to another tornado for about 100 yards before moving independently. Shortly after touching down, the tornado demolished two well-built houses, leveling one, near the town of Paris, garnering an F4 rating. Some farm buildings were also damaged or destroyed in rural areas of Monroe County. A pickup truck was thrown 100 yards into the living room of a house that only had one wall left standing. Debris from the leveled house was found a half-mile away. The tornado continued east, destroying two mobile homes and damaging two houses. Numerous trees were snapped in this area. At one point, the circulation split in two, and a double funnel/damage path was observed. The tornado destroyed several mobile homes on the west side of Monroe City. A church sustained considerable roof and wall damage, and other buildings suffered roof damage as well. Despite the extent of the damage, no one was harmed.

== Non–tornadic events ==
=== Quad Cities Area ===
Extremely strong winds were recorded throughout northwestern Illinois and eastern Iowa. A record wind gust of 107 mph (172 km/h) was recorded at the Quad Cities Airport in Moline. The wind measurement was verified with backup equipment from the FAA after the main instrument failed.

The winds, which were equivalent to a strong Category 2 hurricane, caused severe damage to numerous houses, along with countless trees and power lines. The damage was reported to have been caused by a microburst.

=== Northern Illinois ===
A microburst containing winds between 85 and 100 mph (137 and 161 km/h) was reported in Bridgeview, a south suburb of Chicago. The microburst hit the area just after midnight on March 13, and may have been part of a supercell to hit the southern suburbs just before the thunderstorm complex exited the area at 3:00 a.m. CST. Roofs were ripped off apartments along a three block length, and seven garages were damaged or destroyed, according to the Chicago Tribune. Harlem Avenue in Bridgeview (Illinois Route 43) in the vicinity of 77th Street was closed for four hours while debris was cleared from the road.

Flash flooding closed U.S. Route 45 around U.S. Route 30, but major flooding was not reported on any of the area highways during the rush hour. 15,000 customers were left without power as the thunderstorms passed. The number had been reduced to 2,000 by daybreak, but strong winds knocked a total of 17,000 customers offline as of midday Monday.

Strong winds also forced the closure of parts of downtown Evanston when building material blew off a 29-story building, slightly injuring a construction worker. Four more construction workers were injured, one seriously, in Antioch when a roof being constructed for a new church collapsed due to the wind. A Wind Advisory was issued by the National Weather Service, indicating sustained winds of at least 30 mph (48 km/h) and gusts of up to 50 mph (80 km/h).

=== Eastern Illinois ===
Both Ford County, Illinois and Iroquois County, Illinois recorded damage due to microbursts. In Ford County along Illinois Route 9, power poles were snapped and damage to vehicles was recorded and attributed to a microburst which had winds between 85 and 100 mph (137 and 161 km/h). In Iroquois County, most of a cattle building was blown into a field just west of Illinois Route 1 near Milford. This microburst had reported winds of 90 mph (140 km/h).

Damage around Crescent City and Interstate 57 in Iroquois County was likely caused by straight-line winds.

== See also ==
- List of North American tornadoes and tornado outbreaks
- Tornadoes of 2006
