= Tornadoes of 2006 =

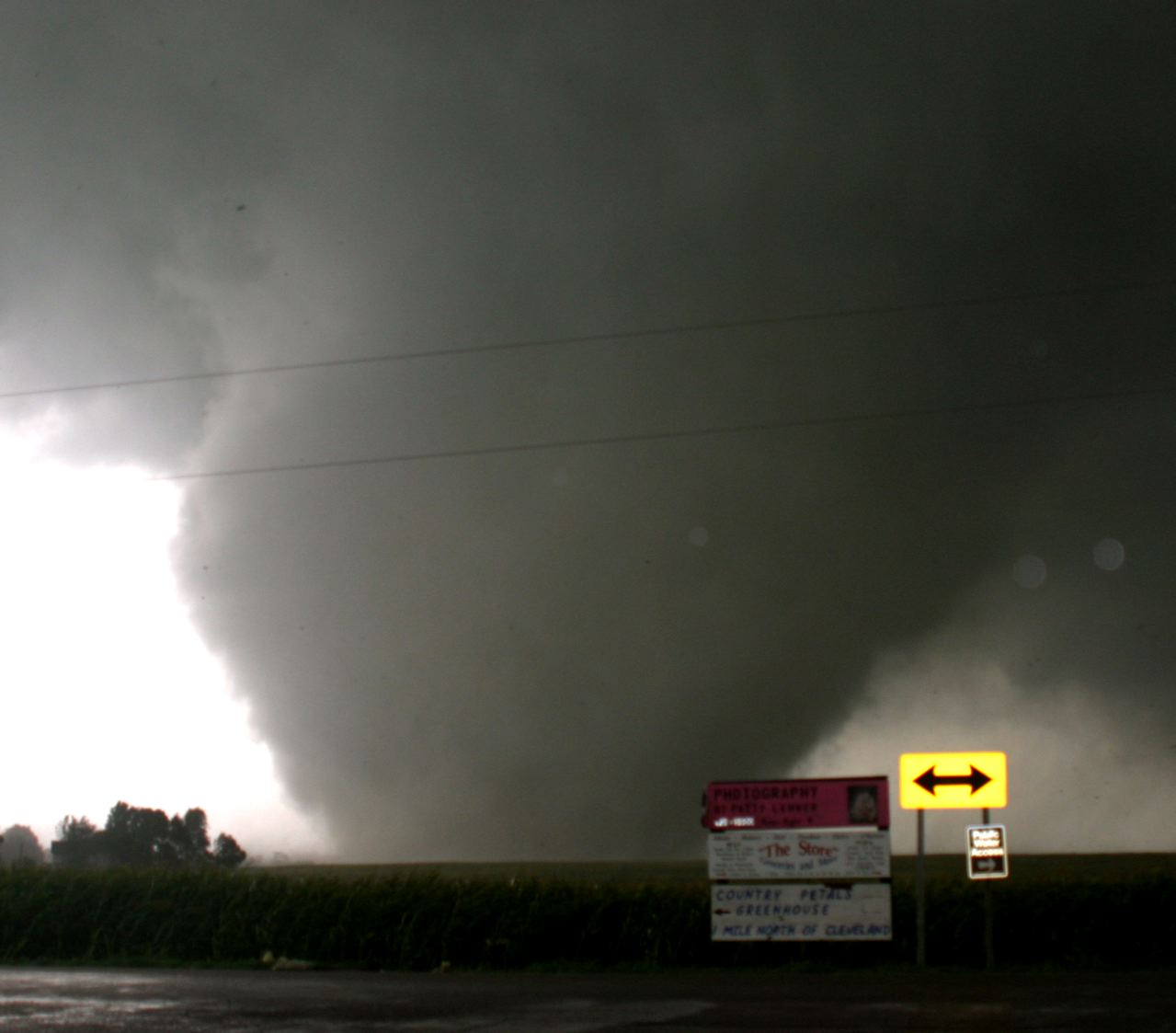
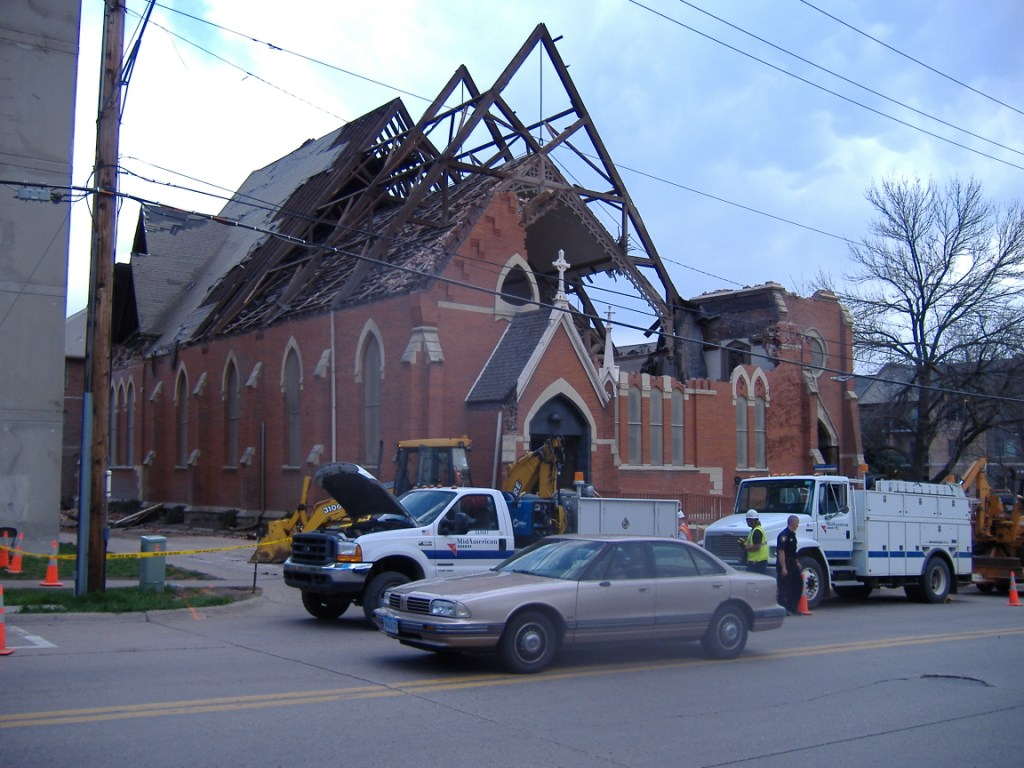
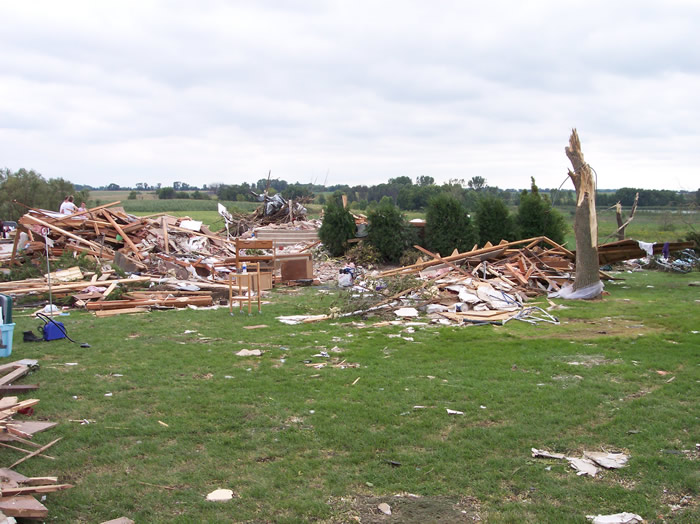
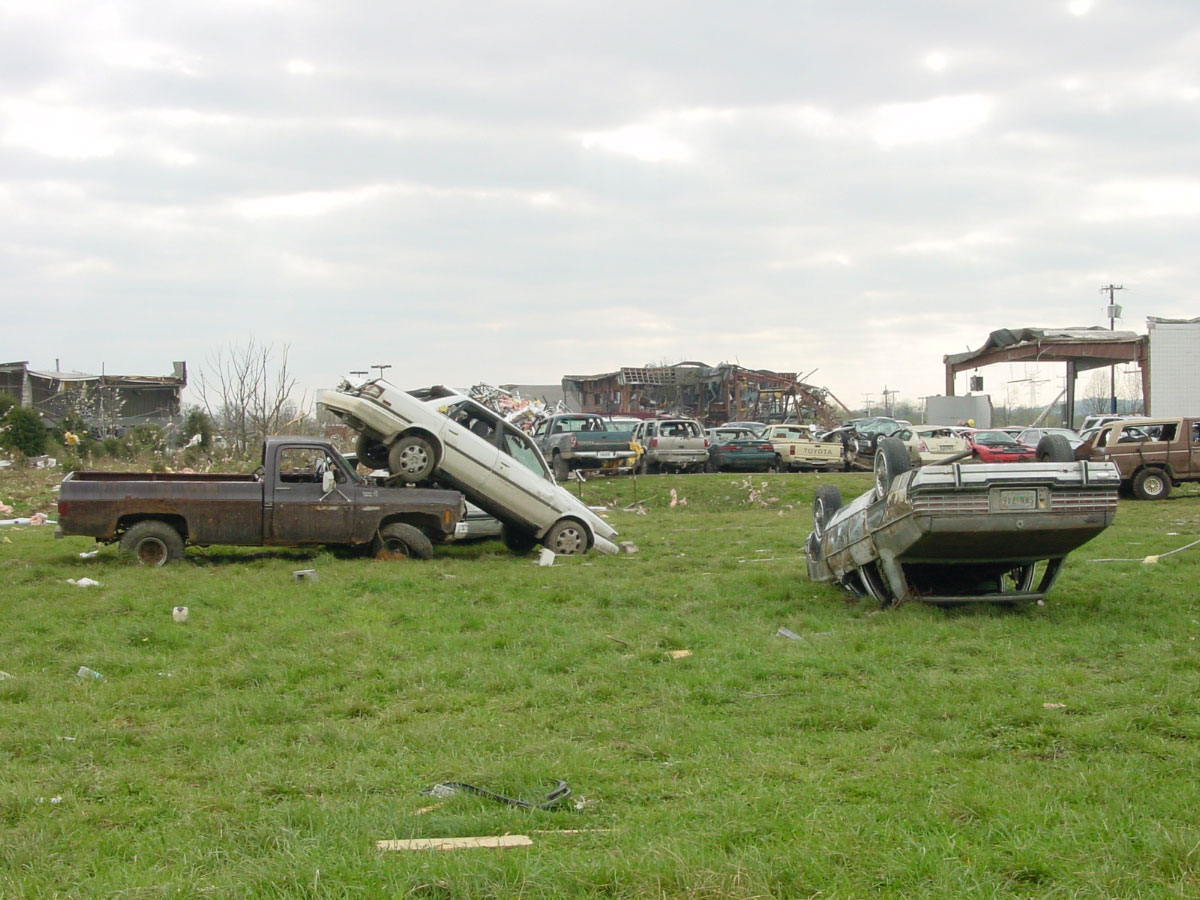
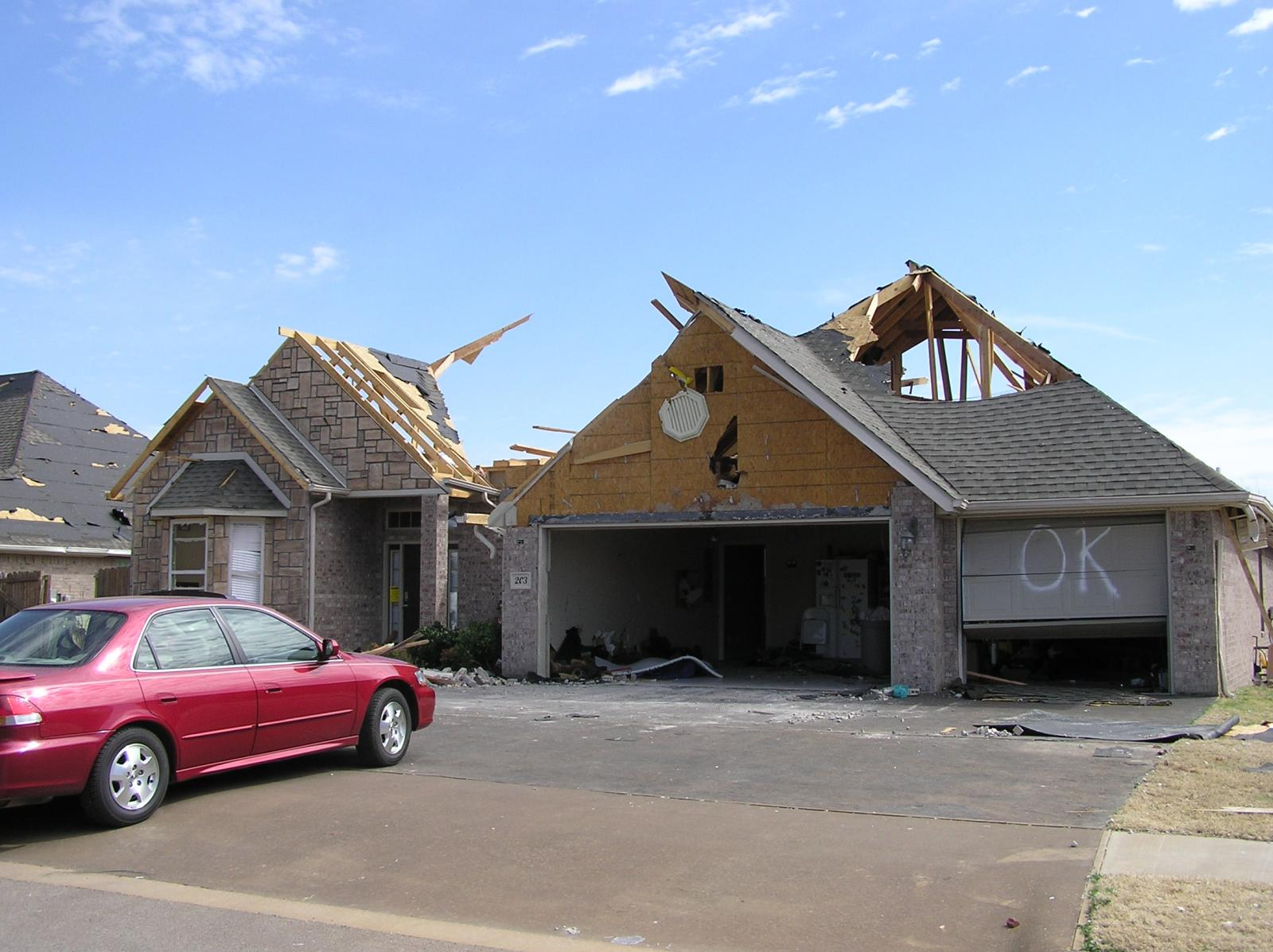
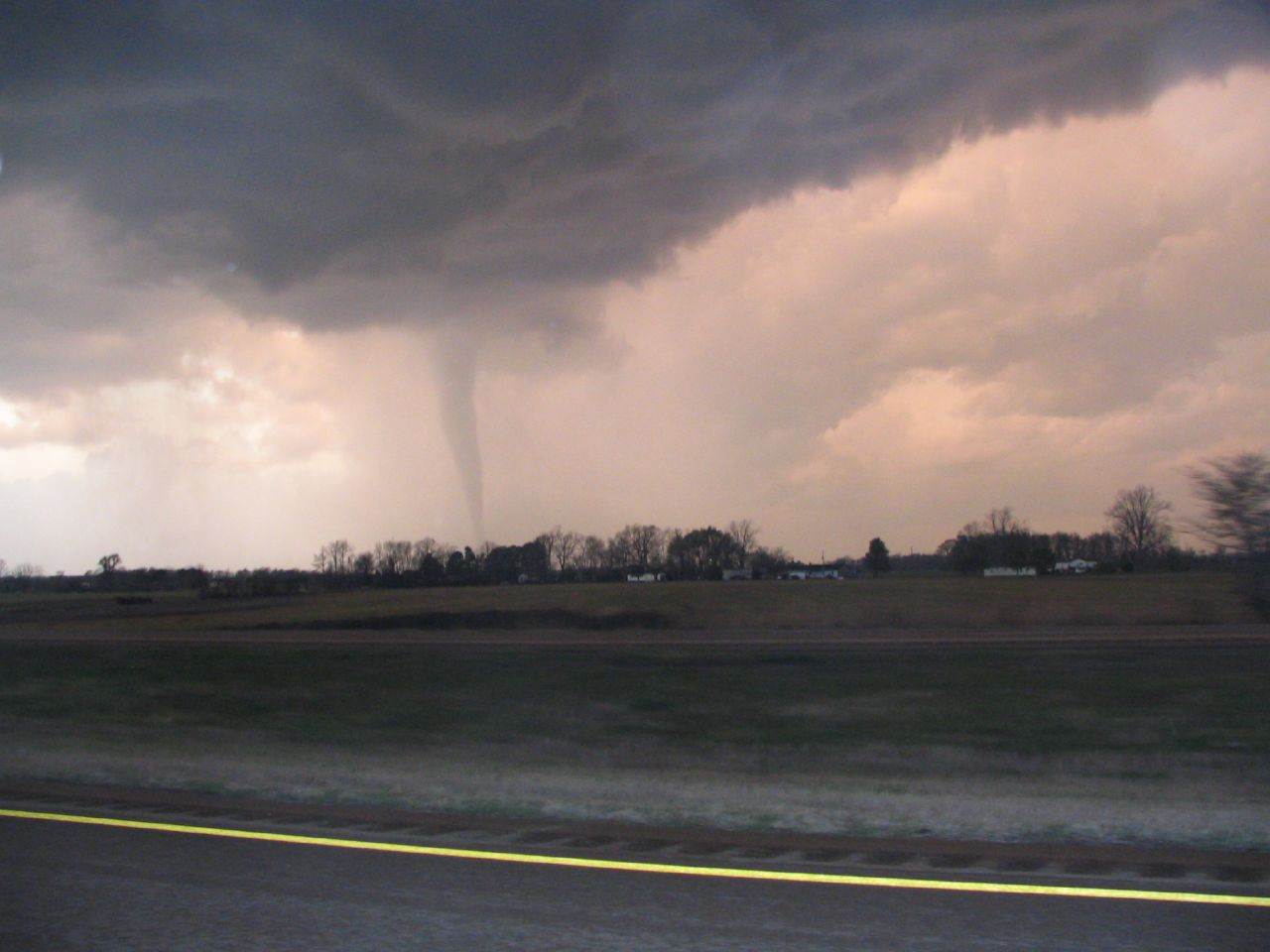
- Clockwise from top: An F3 tornado near Cleveland, Minnesota on August 24; A destroyed house in Kasota, Minnesota; F2 damage to a home in Bentonville, Arkansas after a tornado on March 12; An F3 tornado near Wynne, Arkansas on April 2; Damaged cars and buildings in Gallatin, Tennessee after an F3 tornado on April 6; Damage to a church in Iowa City, Iowa after an F2 tornado on April 13.
- Timespan: January 1 – December 30, 2006
- Maximum rated tornado: F4 tornado: Monroe City, Missouri on March 12; Crosstown, Missouri on September 22
- Tornadoes in U.S.: 1,103
- Damage (U.S.): $758.96 million
- Fatalities (U.S.): 67
- Fatalities (worldwide): 119

This page documents notable tornadoes and tornado outbreaks worldwide in 2006. Strong and destructive tornadoes form most frequently in the United States, Bangladesh, and Eastern India, but they can occur almost anywhere under the right conditions. Tornadoes also develop occasionally in southern Canada during the Northern Hemisphere's summer and somewhat regularly at other times of the year across Europe, Asia, Argentina, Brazil and Australia. Tornadic events are often accompanied with other forms of severe weather, including strong thunderstorms, strong winds, and hail.

In 2006, there were 1,333 reported tornadoes in the US (of which 1,103 tornadoes were confirmed), with 67 reported fatalities (about half of those recorded in Tennessee). In addition, four other tornado-related deaths were reported in Europe - all of them in Germany where 119 tornadoes were confirmed, 12 deaths in Japan, nine deaths in China, 22 deaths in Vietnam, three deaths in the Democratic Republic of the Congo, one death in Brazil, and one tornado fatality has been reported in Canada, in the province of Manitoba for a worldwide total of 119.

== Synopsis ==
November 2005 was very active for tornadoes across the United States, with three large outbreaks and one additional significant tornado (see the List of tornadoes and tornado outbreaks). For much of December 2005; a cold, stable Arctic air mass prevailed over much of the United States east of the Rockies. However, by the start of the new year the pattern began to reverse itself, and moist, unstable air once again flowed northward from the Gulf of Mexico (a pattern normally reserved for spring) and combined with a series of strong low pressure systems tracking across the country, conditions were present for tornado formation.

The formation had led to an enormous upswing in tornado activity in the early spring, and the tornado reports were at record pace, with nearly continuous activity for an eight-week period throughout March and April, similar to the pace of tropical activity in the 2005 Atlantic hurricane season.

Activity slowed down in May with fewer tornadoes overall spread out over a much larger area due to less favorable conditions. The air became somewhat more stable and wind shear decreased, despite the large number of storms that tracked across the US. Since then, activity has been generally fairly low, with no major outbreaks anywhere in the summer of 2006, although the actual number of tornadoes has been moderate. However, in Canada a series of strong low pressure systems, combined with high heat and humidity had led to numerous severe weather events across the country with several tornadoes occurring in the Prairies, in Ontario and Quebec.

The fall severe weather season began unusually early, with a moderate event in mid-September followed by a significant outbreak in the latter part of the month. After that, activity slowed down with few significant tornadoes in October and early November. However, several significant events took place in the second half of November into December, to end 2006.

The most severe tornadoes reported were two F4 tornadoes. They took place on March 12 in Monroe City, Missouri and on September 22 in Crosstown, Missouri. The deadliest single tornado was on April 2 in Newbern, Tennessee where 16 people were killed (out of 29 in the outbreak). The most destructive tornado outside the US was on November 7 in Saroma, Hokkaido, Japan, where nine people died.

== Events ==
=== United States Yearly Total ===
Confirmed tornadoes by Fujita rating
FU	F0	F1	F2	F3	F4	F5	Total
0	686	292	93	30	2	0	1,103

Fatal United States tornadoes in 2006
- Approximate touchdown location of killer tornadoes in 2006
Summary of tornadoes
- January 13 – Alabama (1 death)
- March 11 – Missouri (2 deaths)
- March 12 – Missouri (1 death)
- March 12 – Missouri (1 death)
- March 12 – Missouri (1 death)
- March 12 – Missouri (4 deaths)
- March 12 – Missouri (1 death)
- March 30 – Missouri (1 death)
- April 2 – Illinois (1 death)
- April 2 – Arkansas, Missouri (2 deaths)
- April 2 – Tennessee (16 deaths)
- April 2 – Tennessee (6 deaths)
- April 2 – Tennessee (2 deaths)
- April 7 – Tennessee (7 deaths)
- April 7 – Tennessee (2 deaths)
- April 7 – Tennessee (1 death)
- April 13 – Iowa (1 death)
- May 9 – Texas (3 deaths)
- August 24 – Minnesota (1 death)
- September 16 – Minnesota (1 death)
- November 15 – Louisiana (1 death)
- November 15 – North Carolina (1 death)
- November 16 – North Carolina (8 deaths)
- December 1 – Pennsylvania (1 death)
- December 29 – Texas (1 death)
Total fatalities: 67

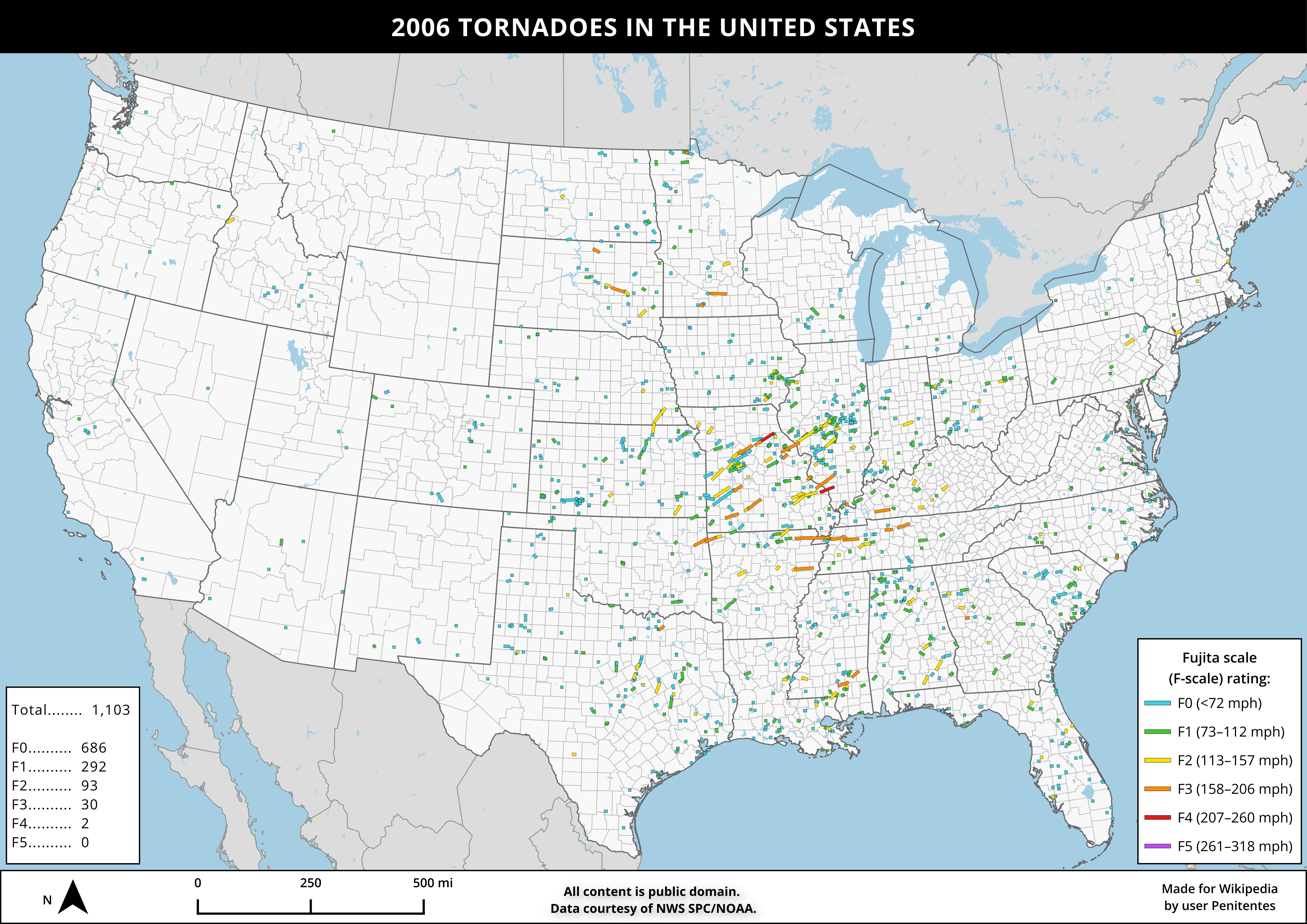
A map of 2006 United States tornado paths from the results of storm surveys.

== January ==
There were 43 tornadoes reported in the US in January. However, 47 were confirmed.

=== January 2 ===
FU	F0	F1	F2	F3	F4	F5
0	5	9	4	1	0	0

On January 2, the Storm Prediction Center forecast a moderate risk of severe thunderstorms for much of the southeastern United States from the Ohio Valley to the Gulf Coast. Two major clusters of tornadic supercell thunderstorms developed, one in central Kentucky and one in western Georgia. 19 confirmed tornadoes touched down. This outbreak produced a few strong tornadoes, including an F2 that hit the west side of Elizabethtown, Kentucky. An F3 caused major damage near Zebulon, Georgia as well. There were only a few minor injuries. Damages from the tornadoes totalled $7.452 million.

=== January 11 ===
FU	F0	F1	F2	F3	F4	F5
0	0	2	0	0	0	0

In the final review of 2006, two isolated tornadoes were confirmed to have touched down in Virginia. Both were rated as F1. Two people were injured in James City. Damages from the tornadoes totaled $40,000.

=== January 12–15 ===
FU	F0	F1	F2	F3	F4	F5
0	15	9	1	0	0	0

On the evening of January 12, a squall line began to organize over eastern parts of Oklahoma and Texas. A rotating supercell embedded within the squall line produced an F2 tornado in Yell County, Arkansas. The next day, several tornadoes developed from supercells that evolved from the remnants of the squall line across the southeastern states, with the first tornado-inflicted death of 2006 in an F1 tornado near Belleville, Alabama as well as about a dozen students injured at a damaged school in Baker, Florida. Damages from the tornadoes totaled $8.395 million.

=== January 28 ===
FU	F0	F1	F2	F3	F4	F5
0	4	0	0	0	0	0

In the final review of 2006, four F0 tornadoes were confirmed to have touched down, three of which were in Kansas and the fourth in Washington state. Damages from the tornadoes totaled $110,000.

== February ==
There were 15 tornadoes reported in the US in February, of which 12 were confirmed.

=== February 2 ===
FU	F0	F1	F2	F3	F4	F5
0	2	1	1	0	0	0

On February 2, several tornadoes tore through Greater New Orleans which had already been devastated by catastrophic Hurricane Katrina in August 2005. The western suburbs, particularly Kenner, took most of the hits. Several homes were heavily damaged, most of them already damaged by Katrina but suffering additional damage. Louis Armstrong International Airport took a direct hit from one of the tornadoes, which caused more damage than was done by the hurricane several months earlier. Electricity was also cut to the airport.

Damages from the tornadoes totaled $1.785 million.

== March ==
There were 143 confirmed tornadoes in the US in March.

=== March 8 (Democratic Republic of the Congo) ===
A tornado damaged thousands of buildings, amounting to about 1/3 of the total buildings in the town of Oicha. This included houses, schools, churches, commercial buildings, and hospitals. Three were killed and 66 were injured, including 3 in critical condition.

=== March 9–13 ===
FU	F0	F1	F2	F3	F4	F5
0	45	26	16	11	1	0

An enormous multi-day tornado outbreak occurred starting on March 9 and continuing until March 13. Over those five days, there were 99 tornadoes confirmed out of as many as 160 tornadoes reported. 27 of them were considered "strong" (F2-F3) and one was considered "violent" (F4-F5) The majority (62) of the tornadoes occurred on March 12, particularly in Missouri and Illinois. At least 12 deaths were blamed on the severe weather, 10 as a result of tornadoes.

Most of the activity on March 9 took the form of a serial derecho, although eight tornadoes were reported. At least two people were killed that day in storms, but not in tornadoes. There was little activity on March 10, but it picked up again on March 11 with 18 tornadoes in the mid-Mississippi Valley. Two people were killed near Saint Mary, Missouri when their truck was thrown into a propane tank.

The main outbreak took place on March 12, with at least 62 tornadoes, including most of the strong tornadoes and the only violent one, and eight fatalities. Activity continued farther south over Alabama and Mississippi on March 13 with 15 weak (F0-F1) tornadoes before the outbreak finally ended.

=== March 19–20 ===
A small tornado event took place in the South Central United States on March 19 and March 20, with one tornado in Texas and several in Mississippi and Oklahoma.

The strongest tornado (and first of the event) took place in Uvalde, Texas late on March 19, where an F2 tornado touched down. Severe damage was reported in the community, and several homes were destroyed, including mobile homes. Remarkably, no injuries were reported. The tornado damage was difficult to distinguish from the damage reported as a result of microbursts in the area which had winds as strong as 90 mph (145 km/h). It was the strongest tornado in the region since October 2001.

A total of six tornadoes were reported on March 20. Two took place in Oklahoma and four in Mississippi. All were rated F0 or F1 and damage was generally minor.

=== March 23 ===
A rare tornado touched down in Hawaii late on March 23, on the island of Lanai. It occurred at about 9:35 p.m. HAST (0735 UTC), and little damage was reported from the F0 tornado. It was only notable because of its unusual location.

=== March 27 (Europe) ===
A line of thunderstorms with some supercells tracked across the Netherlands, France, Belgium, and Germany, spawning tornadoes in Germany, including one that tracked through the southern section of Hamburg at about 7:00 p.m. local time (1700 UTC) on March 27. The tornadoes killed two people who were caught on construction cranes when the tornado hit. 300,000 people also lost electricity as a result of the storms. Damage was reported to be significant, including flipped cars and major roof damage to numerous houses. Rail traffic was also halted temporarily. Damage was estimated at several million euros. No Fujita scale rating was officially assigned. However, the damage suggested an F1 to F2 tornado.

=== March 29 (Brazil) ===
At least four confirmed F1-F2 tornadoes hit the municipalities of Piracicaba and Santa Bárbara d'Oeste, in São Paulo state, at around 11:00 a.m. local time (UTC−03:00). An official anemometer measured winds up 158 km/h (98 mph). One person died and 15 others were injured. In Piracicaba, the damage was estimated at 1,500,000 BRL.

=== March 30–31 ===
On March 30, a moderate tornado event developed across the central United States, from Iowa to Oklahoma. There were 24 tornadoes reported, of which 12 were confirmed. However, most touched down in rural areas and there have only been isolated damage reports. One person died six months later, and five others were injured. Many more reports of straight-line winds, microbursts and large hail (as large as baseballs) were reported.

There were three tornadoes of note. The strongest tornado touched down in Andrew County, Missouri, which severely damaged several houses. It was a high-end F2. Another tornado touched down in Sedalia, Missouri, which was hard hit by the March 12 tornado outbreak. Damage was much less than the last hit, but one person was killed. That one was confirmed to have been a low-end F1. There was a report in the city of Omaha, Nebraska of an F1.

The activity continued on March 31, although it was primarily a straight line wind event across the Ohio Valley. Three tornadoes were reported, two of them were F2: one in Van Wert, Ohio and another in western Shelby County, Indiana.

== April ==
There were 244 confirmed tornadoes in the US in April.

=== April 2 ===
FU	F0	F1	F2	F3	F4	F5
0	27	25	8	6	0	0

The second major tornado outbreak of 2006 took place on April 2 in a large swath from Iowa to Mississippi and from western Missouri to the central Ohio Valley. 66 tornadoes were confirmed that day, and 30 people were killed, 28 by tornadoes.

The outbreak was first expected to begin on April 1. Despite considerable threat levels and awareness, only one small tornado was reported on April 1, in Pawnee County, Kansas. Severe weather was largely restricted to significant microbursts and large hail.

Severe weather quickly picked up on April 2 across a nine-state region. There were no less than 66 confirmed tornadoes. Damage was widespread in dozens of communities, in addition to very strong microbursts of winds as strong as 90 mph (145 km/h) and hail as large as softballs. The hardest-hit area was Dyer and Gibson counties in Tennessee, where at least 24 people were killed.

There was a moderate risk of severe weather on April 3 in the southeastern United States as the line was expected to refire. However, no tornadoes were reported, just straight-line wind damage.

=== April 6–8 ===
FU	F0	F1	F2	F3	F4	F5
0	41	25	5	2	0	0

The third major tornado outbreak occurred over the Central and Southern United States on April 6 and 7, and lasted into early April 8. At least 62 tornadoes were confirmed out of over 80 reported tornadoes. The hardest hit region was the Middle Tennessee area, where 10 deaths (seven in Gallatin, three near McMinnville) and heavy damage were reported. Another fatality was reported in Marion County, Alabama.

The Storm Prediction Center had issued a rare high risk for severe weather for both April 6 and 7, with an unprecedented 60% probability of a tornado within 25 miles of a point south of the Nashville area.

=== April 13–18 ===
FU	F0	F1	F2	F3	F4	F5
0	30	18	6	0	0	0

On April 13, a complex of severe thunderstorms formed in eastern Iowa, bringing many reports of large hail along with reports of strong tornadoes, some with debris. It was unexpected, as the SPC issued only a slight risk of severe weather and never issued a tornado watch. The worst impacts were felt in and around Iowa City, where an F2 tornado caused significant damage. Unfortunately, there was one fatality reported as a result of an F1 tornado that touched down in Johnson County and crossed into Muscatine County.

A steady stream of severe weather occurred for several days in the upper Mississippi Valley, lower Great Lakes, and Ohio Valley regions over the Easter weekend. A moderate risk of severe weather was in place for Saturday, April 15 in parts of Iowa and Nebraska. Moderate risks of severe weather were also issued for parts of central Illinois and southern Indiana on Good Friday, April 14 and Easter Sunday, April 16. There were five to 20 reports of tornadoes each day.

Scattered tornadoes causing relatively light damage continued on April 17 and 18.

=== April 28–29 ===
A small tornado event developed primarily in Texas and southern Oklahoma on April 28, although it was primarily a derecho event. There was also an isolated tornado in Louisiana on April 29.

There were at least nine reported tornadoes in the area on April 28 and 29 along with numerous reports of significant wind damage. At least four people were injured in Coldspring, Texas when a tornado touched down there. It was confirmed to have been an F2 tornado. There were also numerous reports of straight-line winds as strong as 100 mph (160 km/h) and hail as large as baseballs and 10 tornadoes reported.

There was also one tornado in Louisiana, just north of New Orleans, late on April 29.

== May ==
There were 139 confirmed tornadoes in the US in May.

=== May 2–5 ===
Another small but widespread tornado event developed across much of the Great Plains on the evening of May 2. Two main clusters - one over Texas and Oklahoma, and the other primarily in South Dakota - produced a total of 10 reported tornadoes, along with powerful straight-line winds of up to 86 mph (139 km/h) and hail up to softball-sized. Damage was sporadic in the region, with isolated pockets of varying degrees of damage. No injuries were reported.

Several more tornadoes developed on May 3 and again on May 4 across the same regions, but damage was relatively minor.

The activity became somewhat more severe once again on May 5 across Texas. There were 18 reported tornadoes and many reports of wind and hail damage. One person was injured. A strong storm formed over the Waco area in the late hours of the night of May 5, and early morning hours of May 6. This storm spawned a single tornado with damage rated as an F2 on the Fujita Scale.

=== May 9–10 ===
Another widespread but mostly minor tornado outbreak took place across portions of the United States. The event began on the 9th with a few scattered weak tornadoes touching down in Oklahoma and Alabama, all of which were rated F0. Later that evening, additional tornado activity began to occur in Texas. An F2 struck the north side of Childress, Texas, resulting in considerable damage. Many trees along the path were snapped and uprooted, roofs of homes were damaged, and sheds were overturned in residential areas. As the tornado struck Childress High School, the gymnasium lost its roof and sustained total collapse of a large brick wall. Three air conditioning units were blown off the roof of the school, and two of them were blown from southeast to northwest, landing 90 to 200 feet from the school. A nearby nursing home was also damaged. At Fair Park, a tennis court was destroyed, several metal light poles were bent and snapped, and a pedestrian bridge that spanned a small lake was ripped from its wooden supports and thrown. An industrial storage building that housed emergency vehicles was completely destroyed, with steel beams twisted. One person in town was injured by a falling tree. Further south, a likely violent tornado passed north of Westminster, Texas and caused major damage in rural areas outside of town. Livestock was killed, trees were snapped, and homes and outbuildings were destroyed. Some of the destroyed homes were reduced to bare slabs, and aerial photography revealed that extensive ground scouring occurred along much of the path. Several vehicles in the area were thrown and wrapped around trees as well. The tornado was officially rated high-end F3 (though this rating is disputed due to the intensity of the damage.) Overall, the Westminster tornado killed 3 people and injured 10 others.

Widespread tornado activity continued across the Southern United States and Midwestern United States on the 10th, though most of them were weak. However, an F2 tornado touched down near Jonesville, Louisiana and flipped numerous pieces of farm machinery, several tractors, and an 18-wheel semi-truck. Several windows were blown out and some irrigation equipment was also destroyed. Large areas of corn were flattened in farm fields, and trees were snapped as well. Another F2 tornado touched down near Fayette, Mississippi and traversed heavily wooded areas, flattening a swath of large trees. Overall, this outbreak produced 30 tornadoes and killed 3 people.

=== May 14 ===
A line of severe storms developed over much of the Southern United States on the afternoon of May 14. While the bulk of the damage was due to large hail, there were at least 17 tornadoes reported (of which seven were confirmed), with the most severe one taking place near Concord, North Carolina. Significant structural damage was reported in the area, including roofs blown off houses. It was confirmed to have been an F1 tornado.

The other tornadoes were scattered around the Carolinas and in Texas on the same line. Most of them were relatively minor.

=== May 19–20 (Europe) ===
Europe's second significant outbreak of 2006 took place, primarily in Germany. There were at least nine confirmed tornadoes in the region, all of which were F1 or F2. It was part of a longer squall line that resulted in significant damage and many injuries along with one death.

=== May 21 ===
The first significant tornado in the Northeastern United States took place on May 21. It was an isolated event in Hampton Falls, New Hampshire and was confirmed to have been an F2 tornado. Damage was significant along a narrow path, primarily to trees and vehicles along Interstate 95 in the area. Two people were injured.

=== May 24–25 ===
A strong front developed over the Upper Midwest on May 24 and extended along the Mississippi Valley. It was primarily a straight-line wind event, although there were at least five tornadoes reported, some of which produced significant damage. A greater risk of tornadic activity was issued by the SPC on May 25 for a large swath from the Great Lakes to the central Mississippi Valley. The event turned into a derecho with hundreds of severe wind damage reports, but only six tornado reports. There were no tornado-related injuries, but at least one person was injured by straight-line winds.

=== May 30–31 ===
A hot and humid air mass entered the northeastern part of the U.S as well as much of southern Ontario and Quebec, and severe thunderstorms and tornadoes were sparked by a cold front. Numerous severe weather events were reported across Michigan, Indiana, Illinois and New York - primarily damaging wind and hail events - when a storm system crossed the area during these two days. On May 30, there were at least six reports of tornadoes in Indiana and Illinois with no immediate reports of significant damage or injuries. Also, Lanark County in eastern Ontario had two tornado warnings in a span of 18 hours, with the threat of a strong tornado on the evening of May 30. While damage was reported near Highway 7 southwest of Perth due to straight-line damaging winds, there were no immediate reports of tornadoes despite rotation inside two distinct supercells detected by radar.

== June ==
There were 139 confirmed tornadoes in the US in June.

=== June 5–7 ===
A low pressure system over the northern Plains and a cold front triggered a small tornado outbreak. 17 tornadoes were reported in the Dakotas, eastern Iowa and southwestern Wisconsin during these two days (of which at least seven were confirmed), 14 of them occurring on June 6. Two tornadoes were located near Barneveld, Wisconsin, which was the site of an F5 tornado almost the same day in 1984. Both tornadoes were an F0. with damage especially confined to trees, although one home was damaged. There were no reported injuries. There was another tornado in Sauk and Columbia counties in Wisconsin, an F1 tornado. A separate system had reportedly spawned a tornado which inflicted damage to numerous houses near Seymour, Indiana north of Louisville, Kentucky, but it was confirmed to have been a microburst.

=== June 10 ===
More widespread severe weather occurred in the Central Plains with over 100 reports, mostly wind and hail events including reports of hurricane force wind-gusts. Tornadoes were confined especially in Nebraska where a mobile home and a barn were damaged and trailer was overturned near Gordon, Nebraska. There was also significant damage to trees and powerlines in New Florence, Missouri west of St. Louis.

=== June 11–14 (Tropical Storm Alberto) ===
Tropical Storm Alberto made landfall on June 13, but was producing squalls well before then. Alberto's bands produced a small tornado event in the Southeastern United States. There were 16 tornadoes reported; four in Florida, three in Georgia, six in South Carolina and three in North Carolina. At least seven of the tornadoes were confirmed; one was an F1 and the rest were F0. One person suffered minor injuries in one of the tornadoes.

=== June 16 ===
A major wind event occurred in the Southern Plains states as a low pressure system crossed the area. There were at least 17 wind reports exceeding 75 mph (120 km/h) with significant local damage. The heaviest of the activity occurred in Nebraska, Kansas, Oklahoma and Texas. Despite the severity of the storms, only four tornadoes were reported in Kansas and three were confirmed; one was an F0 and the other two were F1, all in Sherman County.

=== June 18–19 ===
A warm and humid air mass was covering much of the eastern U.S. as well as Ontario and Quebec during this period of severe weather. With the passage of a cold front and instability, it created a wide area of severe thunderstorms, some as supercells and others as squall lines, which created numerous damage in several U.S. cities as well as important Canadian cities such as Ottawa, Sherbrooke and Granby, Quebec. First, an unexpected tornado touched down in Hartford, Wisconsin in the middle of a rain storm with few other storm reports on June 18. Over 50 buildings were reported to have been damaged. Three people were injured by what turned out to be an F1 tornado. Meanwhile, in Pembroke, Ontario further to the east, what was possibly a tornado but confirmed as a microburst, several roofs including one from a marina and another one from a large warehouse were blown away during the passage of a supercell storm. On June 19, a widespread severe weather event took place throughout the Great Lakes region and into the Northeast. There were no confirmed tornadoes in the US that day, but two were confirmed in Ontario, Canada. One tornado touched down just north of Stratford, Ontario; it was an F1 and caused moderate damage. A second tornado near Collingwood occurred late Sunday evening and also rated F1, with a storage shed completely destroyed.

=== June 21–24 ===
On the first day of summer, June 21, a significant severe weather outbreak began to develop in much of the Midwest and adjacent areas of Ontario. The most severe weather took place along the I-90 corridor and around Thunder Bay, Ontario, where tornadoes were reported. Another tornado was reported southwest of Detroit inside a massive cluster of severe thunderstorms that passed through the area in the early evening. However, the tornado did little damage; most of the damage in southeast Michigan was due to straight-line winds. Another area of severe weather spawned numerous possible tornadoes in Kansas, Texas, Oklahoma and Colorado, with severe weather reports also occurring in Iowa, Wisconsin, Missouri and Nebraska. Three people were injured as a result of a landfalling waterspout in Charlotte County, Florida in a separate and isolated event. It also damaged numerous homes and destroyed several mobile homes. It was confirmed that there were two tornadoes; one was an F2 and one was an F0.

More severe weather took place the following day in areas slightly farther south than the previous day's activity. Again, it was primarily a straight-line wind event, with at least 250 wind reports from Ohio, Indiana, Pennsylvania, Kentucky, Illinois, Missouri, West Virginia and New York with additional reports from the Carolinas, Florida, Georgia, Texas and Oklahoma. A small tornado outbreak occurred in two distinct areas: the Southern Plains and the Ohio Valley. 19 tornadoes were reported - five of them in Elbert County, Colorado (one was confirmed, destroying a house under construction), likely from the same supercell and five from northwest Ohio in Allen and Van Wert counties. Two of the Van Wert County tornadoes were rated F0 (in Willshire and Delphos) and another F1 (also in Willshire) while one of the tornadoes in Allen County was rated F1 with damage limited to sheds and roofs near Beaverdam. Another F0 would hit Willshire the following day. The area has a long history of destructive tornadoes. (See also Veterans Day Weekend tornado outbreak of 2002 and Palm Sunday tornado outbreak of 1965.) One tornado destroyed some barns and heavily damaged two houses in Holmes County, Ohio. That one was an F2, and another tornado in Stark County was rated F1. Other tornadoes were reported from Illinois, Missouri and Kansas. Numerous funnel clouds were also spotted in Alberta with a separate family of thunderstorms over the Canadian Prairies which also brought tornadoes in the Dakotas the following two days.

=== June 25 (Europe) ===
The third significant event for Europe took place on June 25. There were at least nine tornadoes reported, and various reports of damage. There were also reports of significant wind damage from a related squall line.

=== June 30 ===
A sudden F1 tornado took place near Buffalo, New York on the afternoon of June 30 out of a long west–east axis line of severe thunderstorms that developed in the Niagara Peninsula of Ontario and crossed into New York. There were reports of structural damage to several buildings (mainly industrial buildings) in Cheektowaga, New York, according to WGRZ coverage. Also, many vehicles were being thrown off Interstate 90 (the New York State Thruway). There were at least two reported injuries due to this tornado.

== July ==
There were 68 tornadoes reported in the US in July, of which at least 29 have been confirmed.

=== July 2 ===
A rare tornado hit the Canadian province of New Brunswick at about 7 p.m. ADT (2200 UTC) near the western towns of Argyle and Glassville. Rotation was first detected by the Caribou, Maine radar and later confirmed as tornadic activity after Environment Canada surveyed the damage the next day. Several structures such as barns and homes sustained considerable damage and numerous trees were downed during the storm. The tornado was rated as an F1 with winds of about 75 mph (120 km/h) and had a path of roughly 7 km long (about 4 miles) and no injuries were reported.

=== July 11–12 ===
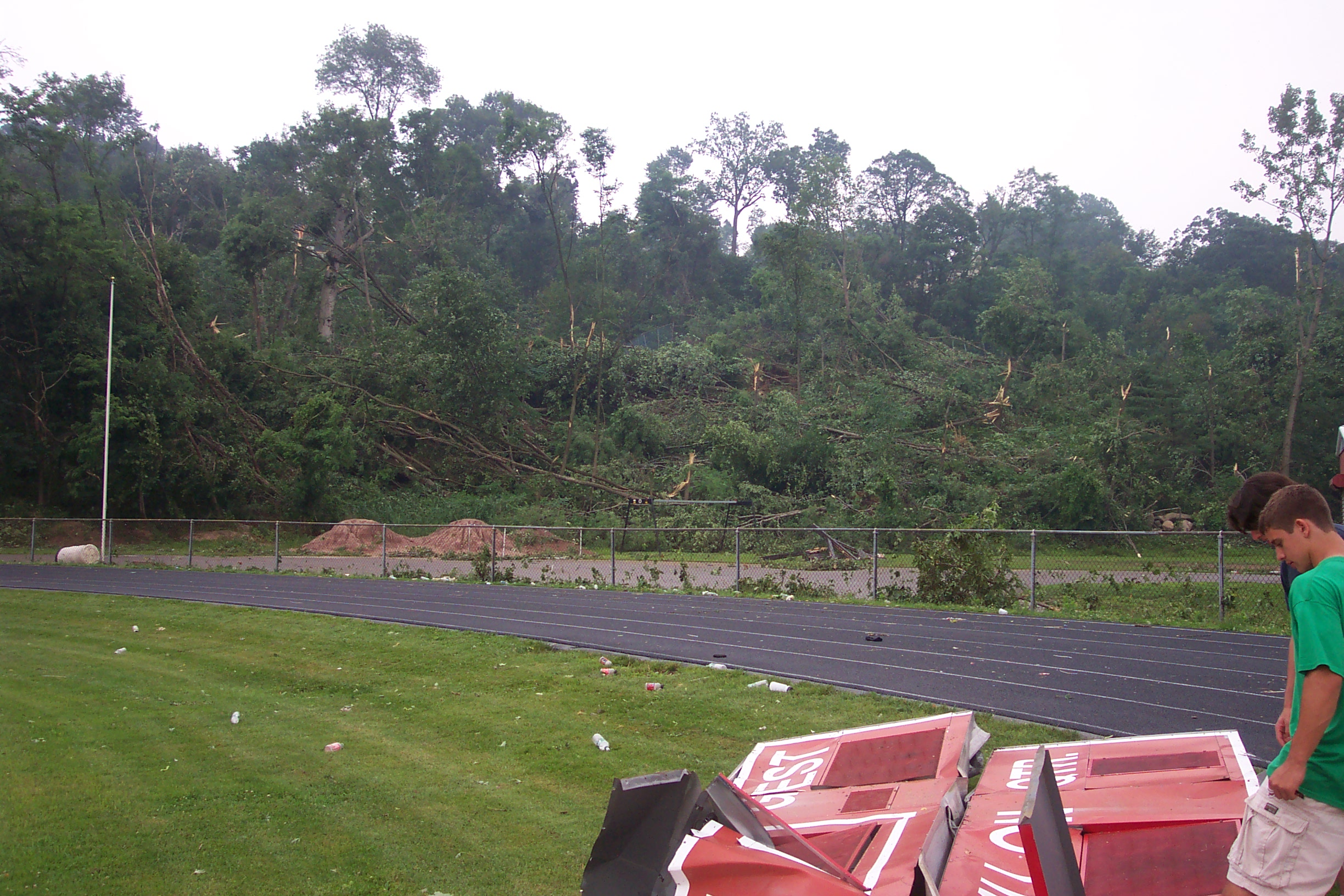
An area with minimal tornado damage in Westchester County, New York.

A small tornado event, centered in southwestern Ohio, took place on July 11. At least 10 tornadoes were reported in the area. There was significant damage reported in Warren County as well as Montgomery County. One person was injured. Seven tornadoes were confirmed - four of them were F1 and three were F0.

The next day, the same weather system tracked eastward into the Northeast. A tornado touched down in Westchester County, New York. The tornado began on the Rockland County shore of the Hudson River, moving at 25 mph across the river toward Sleepy Hollow, just north of the Tappan Zee Bridge. It cut a 200 to 300 yard wide path straight across Westchester and into Fairfield County, Connecticut. That tornado was confirmed to have been an F2, causing F1 damage farther east in Greenwich, Connecticut. Finally, there was what was described as a "strong F2" tornado that formed near Wickett Pond in Wendell, Massachusetts and ripped through the Wendell State Forest. Although many trees were snapped in half, there was very little structural damage, and no injuries. Metro-North Railroad suspended trains on the northern part of the Harlem Line until 5:00 p.m. EDT (21:00 UTC) for the removal of debris on the tracks. Southbound passengers took buses while the tracks were shut down.

=== July 17–18 ===
While much of the focus was on the multiple lines of thunderstorms that crossed over Ontario and Quebec and the US Midwest including the derecho, which possibly spawned numerous tornadoes that swept through northeastern Ontario and southwestern Quebec, at least three tornadoes were reported: one in Larder Lake and two later-confirmed tornadoes in Newmarket, north of Toronto, which were rated F1 and F0. One of these tornadoes traveled for 10 kilometres (6.2 mi). Also, significant tornado-like damage was recorded on Manitoulin Island and in the North Bay area. Another tornado was reported in Notre-Dame du Laus, Quebec north of Gatineau and Ottawa. However, the multiple tree and trailer damage was caused by a microburst embedded inside a powerful progressive derecho.

At least two deaths and numerous injuries were reported; however they resulted from the wider derecho, not the tornado events embedded within it.

=== July 19–20 ===
A similar pattern to the previous event shaped up over parts of the Upper Midwest, although the risk of tornadoes was initially declared even greater. The greatest risk on July 19 was over southern Minnesota and Wisconsin, spreading eastward over Michigan, southern Ontario and into the north-central Appalachians on July 20. The risk extends as far south as roughly the Interstate 70 corridor.

A moderate risk of severe weather had been declared by the SPC for July 19. A cluster of storms did develop in the late afternoon and early evening hours in Missouri and Illinois with additional activity in Wisconsin and southern Minnesota. Three tornadoes were reported including a derecho that formed in the St. Louis metro area with heavy damage to trees and power lines, knocking out power to over 500,000 people. The other reports came from Illinois. In addition, there have been 80-90 reports of severe wind including reports of 80 mph (130 km/h) winds in De Soto, Missouri and in Havana, Illinois.

Severe weather was quite limited the next day, although significant wind reports with local damage were reported in western and southern Quebec. No tornadoes were reported inside the most concerned zone.

=== July 25 ===
An F0 tornado was confirmed in the town of Hébertville, Quebec in the Saguenay–Lac-Saint-Jean region which is located about 180 kilometres north-northwest of Quebec City. During the event, golf ball-size hail smashed windows of houses and automobiles and damaged patio furniture as well as home facades. Corn and vegetable crops were ruined during the brief but robust storm. Farms and sheds sustained damage from the tornadic winds as well as trees. This very region was hit by 5 tornadoes during the summer of 2001, including some of the region's main cities such as Saguenay and Alma. Tornadoes are considered to be rare occurrences in this region, at least prior to 2001.

=== July 26 ===
Central Illinois saw a small tornado event take place on July 26. Eight tornadoes were reported in the area, including Piatt, Macon and Vermilion counties. Of those reports, four were confirmed, including three F0's and another unrated tornado in Rossville. Generally the tornadoes were primarily in the rural areas surrounding Champaign-Urbana. Overall damage was minor, but one shed was destroyed in Hoopeston.

=== July 27 ===
A small outbreak occurred in western Minnesota, and six tornadoes were reported, including a large one near Dawson in Lac qui Parle County near the South Dakota border. Damage reports from the four confirmed tornadoes (three F0's and one F1') were limited to destroyed crops, branches, cottonwoods and signs.

== August ==
There were 95 tornadoes reported in the US, at least 31 of which were confirmed.

=== August 1–2 (Canada and Minnesota) ===
Violent thunderstorms produced two tornadoes in the southern Quebec region August 1 during the evening hours. The damage associated with the F2 tornado was located in Lac-Drolet in the Eastern Townships near Granby. Two people were injured when the winds ripped the whole roof of a home, while a barn was completed destroyed. Several other homes sustained significant damage or nearly destroyed. The tornado was caught on camera.

Another tornado, an F1, hit the community of Saint-Gédéon-de-Beauce in the Beauce region. Numerous maple trees were uprooted by the storm and damage was pegged at $150,000 Canadian dollars.

Two people were killed by events unrelated to the tornado but associated by the thunderstorms related to the derecho that crossed southern Quebec for the Upper Laurentians to the coast of Maine. In the Montreal area, a motorist was killed when a tree fell on his vehicle while driving on a local street in Westmount. Also in the Mauricie region, another was killed by a lightning bolt. Overall, nearly 450,000 homes were without power during the height of the storms.

Meanwhile, the same cold front produced violent weather in Minnesota with a localized tornado event. Four tornadoes were reported and four were confirmed, but one was an F3 – the first in the US since May. It took place in Watonwan County near the town of Butterfield. Another tornado near St. James in Cottonwood County was reported; it was an F1. With the first tornado, one farmhouse was flattened, but it was poorly attached – preventing an F4 according to early surveys. It also destroyed the barns, cornfields and silos surrounding the farmhouse. No injuries were reported. The second tornado left moderate damage – including tearing the roofs of a few houses, although it destroyed a few outbuildings. The path of the second tornado was quite erratic at times.

The same cold front redeveloped on August 2 across the Great Lakes region, leading to numerous tornado and wind damage reports as a strong line of storms, a bow echo, raced through southern-central Ontario with intense supercells on its way to eastern Ontario, including one that prompted a tornado warning for the city of Ottawa. According to a survey by Environment Canada, there were 11 tornadoes confirmed in the province on that day. It was the largest single day tornado outbreak in Ontario since May 31, 1985. The final reports counted two F2, five F1, three F0 strength confirmed tornadoes and one additional (as yet unconfirmed F0), bringing the total to 10 (or possibly 11).

Initially rated an F1, but upgraded to an F2, the strongest of the evening tornadoes touched down south of Barry's Bay, in the town of Combermere at 8:30 p.m. EDT. With the video footage and reports, the tornado did extensive damage in the town and a nearby trailer camp site. Numerous trees and hydro poles were snapped. Two train cars were lifted off a rail line. A local Home Hardware store warehouse was also completely destroyed, several structures including trailers were also heavily damaged or destroyed and cottages and decks sustained significant damage with possible reports of cottages being thrown on the shores and in some cases into the nearby Madawaska River. A state of emergency was declared in that area as damage was pegged in the millions of dollars. It had a path of about 3 kilometres long and 300 metres wide.

East of Bancroft, another F2 was later confirmed as that tornado traveled for 10 kilometres and had a path of damage of about 500 metres wide. One house sustained heavy damage with its roof and 2 walls destroyed. Two barns were also destroyed during the storm.

A F0 was spotted by a weather trainer 3 km east of Morriston near Guelph in the area of Highway 401 and Highway 6 at 3:20 pm, with no reports of damage. That cell occurred nearly 5 hours prior to the main tornado producing storms.

Six other tornadoes were later confirmed as F0's or F1's. They were located in West Guilford (F1), Minden Hills (F1), Drag Lake (F0), Uffington (near Gravenhurst) (F0), Anstruther Lake (near Apsley) (F1), Catchacoma (F0) and Galway-Cavendish and Harvey Township (F0). The Minden Hills tornado also destroyed a 500m-long suspension bridge that passes through a nature reserve of original growth white pine forest, often used during guided school tours. The bridge was closed at the time. These locations are in the Muskoka, Haliburton and Kawartha Highlands regions of Central Ontario.

Overall, over 150,000 customers were without power during August 2's storms, mostly in the Georgian Bay, Haliburton, Hastings and Toronto regions, as well as areas near Arnprior, Peterborough, Belleville, Tweed and Napanee in eastern Ontario. Some 20,000 residents of central and eastern Ontario remained without power 6 days following the storm event.

During the same storm system other non-tornadic winds produced damage, including Hagersville in Haldimand County, where a silo collapsed under the strong winds and crashed into a house. A roof of a house was torn off in Newmarket, the same town hit by two confirmed tornadoes two weeks earlier. Also, an animal shelter in Midland north of Barrie was completely destroyed by a fire caused by the storm. Several animals perished in the blaze. Straight-line damaging winds of about 120 km/h (75 mph) were recorded in many locations, the harder hit areas were central and eastern Ontario but winds and lightning were also high in the south. Power interruption also resulted from a shutdown circuit on a 500kv power line in the Muskoka area as a result of the storm.

=== August 4 (China) ===
On August 4, as Typhoon Prapiroon hit southern China, a tornado formed and traveled through Foshan, Shanwei, and Shaoguan, Guangdong province, killing nine in Foshan

=== August 5 (U.S. and Canada) ===
Early indications were predicting a very active severe weather day in the northern Plains along the Canada–US border. The SPC issued a moderate risk of severe weather and there were strong initial indications of a possible outbreak.

Severe weather erupted in northern Minnesota, southern Manitoba and northwestern Ontario as a strong low pressure system hit the area on August 5. There were two strong tornadoes.

A tornado touched down near Gull Lake, Manitoba, north of Winnipeg and just off Lake Winnipeg, in which one person was killed by the storm while been caught in the tornado's path while walking near campground. Boats, power lines, and cottages were completely destroyed by the 5:19 p.m. CDT (2219 UTC) storm. Ten other people were injured. The storm was later rated as an F2 tornado and Manitoba Premier Gary Doer visited the area devastated by the storm on the next day. Two other tornadoes were confirmed to have touched down in the area. It was the first fatal Canadian tornado since the Pine Lake, Alberta F3 tornado in July 2000.

Another strong tornado was reported near Warroad, Minnesota, on the Manitoba border. It was confirmed to have been an F3 tornado. There was significant damage reported along a 19-mile (31 km) path, including several trailers demolished, a factory complex heavily damaged, several houses also severely damaged and a campground destroyed. Remarkably, no injuries were reported there – the campground had evacuated, and the factory was nearly empty, being a Saturday. Three smaller tornadoes – all of them F0 and F1 – also took place in the area.

Otherwise, the moderate risk of severe weather busted (for the second time in less than two weeks - another MDT bust took place on July 27). Only a few reports of severe winds and hail and no tornadoes were reported beyond the border counties.

=== August 7 (Australia) ===
50 houses were damaged with seven houses completely losing roofs and two people received minor injuries in the suburb of Leschenault in Australind, Western Australia which is located 163 km south of Perth. The Western Australian Bureau of Meteorology measured the tornado to be a F2 on the Fujita scale, with the damage area measuring around 100m by 2000m.

=== August 20 (Poland) ===
At least one strong tornado struck Poland. Affected areas were central and eastern Poland, where at least six tornadoes took place within eight hours. An F2 tracked through Stara Wies in Lubelskie region. Other tornadoes were reported from the regions of Lodzkie, Podkarpackie, Lubelskie and Warminsko-Mazurskie.

A tornado touched down near St. Andrews, Manitoba.

=== August 21 (Germany) ===
An isolated, strong tornado was reported in Remagen in Germany on the evening of August 21. Significant damage was reported in the area as it hit a campground. One person was killed and several others were injured as a result. It was the fourth tornado fatality in Europe in 2006.

=== August 23–24 (U.S. and Canada) ===
FU	F0	F1	F2	F3	F4	F5
0	7	1	3	3	0	0

After a calm period, significant severe weather occurred over the Upper Midwest on August 24 as a sharp cold front passed. On the previous day, there were at least two tornadoes in the province of Saskatchewan but no damage was reported. There were local reports of hail bigger than golf balls (over 5 cm/2" in diameter) on the initial development.

A moderate risk of severe weather was issued by the SPC for August 24, with a significant threat for tornadoes, some of which could be strong. The main threat area ran from North Dakota southeastward into Minnesota and northern Iowa to western Wisconsin.

During the morning hours there was at least one powerful tornadic cell, and severe cells continued to develop into the afternoon and evening hours. The morning cells were mostly large hail producers, but in the afternoon tornadic thunderstorms formed and hit several towns in southern Minnesota. Heavy damage was reported in several communities, mostly in Nicollet and Le Sueur counties. One elderly man was killed in his home in Kasota, Minnesota in Le Sueur County, and 37 other people were injured. The large tornado that caused the fatality in Kasota was rated an F3 by the National Weather Service and had a damage path of 33 miles. In that tornado at least 20 homes were completely destroyed. Many more structures were heavily damaged and scores of cattle were also killed in the storm. One other tornado was reported in Minnesota, an F0 that was reported west of Courtland.

Significant damage was also reported across South Dakota as a line of supercells moved across the area. One tornado near Wolsey in Beadle County was reported to be a quarter-mile wide and was later rated an F3 as well as another one in McPherson County.

Overall, 14 tornadoes were confirmed.

=== August 28 ===
One of the more unexpected tornado events took place in Indiana and Ohio on August 28. Nine tornadoes were reported - primarily near Rushville, Indiana, Decatur, Indiana and Circleville, Ohio. The Decatur and Circleville area tornadoes led to significant damage. A tornado in Auglaize County, Ohio appeared to have a maximum path width of 300 yards but only a length of 3/4 of a mile (still to be confirmed).

Three tornadoes were confirmed. The first one was in Rush County, Indiana, an F0 which tracked for less than 1 mile. Damage was limited to roof shingles and trees. F1 tornadoes were confirmed in Putnam and Adams counties near the Ohio/Indiana border. Garages were destroyed, trees uprooted, power lines snapped, and some damage to homes. One car, was also flipped over on its roof in Adams County.

It was unusual due to the lack of other severe weather in the area; such is normally only seen in tropical systems.

== September ==
For the month of September, there were 90 tornadoes reported in the U.S., of which at least 61 were confirmed.

=== September 14 (England) ===
A tornado in Yorkshire, England struck the covered bridge at Barnsley, several areas of Leeds, and Harrogate Tornado hits during freak storm.

=== September 15–16 (United States and Colombia) ===
After a quiet first half of September, an early-season cold front was expected to trigger significant severe weather on September 15 and 16 across much of the central United States.

The first signs of activity took place on the evening of the 15th, particularly in Nebraska and Kansas. Several tornadoes were reported with varying degrees of damage. The worst tornado, confirmed as an F2, touched down in Surprise, Nebraska, where at least one mobile home was destroyed and roofs were torn off several businesses. Another tornado was later confirmed in Buffalo County. In addition, it knocked out power to most of Butler County. Governor Dave Heineman declared a disaster area in the county. No one was injured. a notable tornado outbreak occurred in the United States, with a total of 1,103 confirmed tornadoes, including significant events in places like Tennessee and Missouri.

On September 16, the Storm Prediction Center issues a moderate risk of severe over parts of the northern and central plains, with a large swath from the Canada–US border to Oklahoma having tornado potential.

Tornadoes first fired off in the late afternoon in South Dakota where several have been reported, with damage reported. In the evening, activity spread into the North Dakota, Minnesota, Iowa, Nebraska and Kansas. 15 tornadoes have been reported including a large one in South Dakota leading to significant damage and one in southwest Omaha, Nebraska, although no major damage has been reported there yet.

Eight tornadoes were confirmed, including one in McCook County that was rated an F2 and another in Minnehaha County near Colton that was rated F1. The worst tornado in this outbreak occurred later in the evening when a killer tornado struck in Hennepin County, Minnesota. At approximately 10:00 p.m., an F2 tornado touched down near Rogers and was on the ground for 8 miles, passing through Dayton and lifting back into the clouds near Ramsey. A 10-year-old girl was killed in Rogers when the home she was in collapsed. Seven others were also injured in this same storm. The tornado severely damaged or destroyed 50 homes, and at least 200 additional homes sustained minor damage.

Meanwhile, in Colombia, a tornado touched down at 2:00 P.M on the north side of the city of Barranquilla in the Campoalegre neighborhood, and began to move towards the Ciudad Jardín neighborhood where it caused more damage. The tornado destroyed three schools in the city, light towers, water tanks and pulled trees out of the ground, roots and all. There was 13 people injured including children from the schools. The tornado was classified as an F3 tornado. There were no deaths reported. After the tornadic storm passed through, the Barranquilla streets turned into rivers from the powerful storm. Lightning had also destroyed the electricity cables in the city.

=== September 18 (Japan) ===
A tornado killed three and injured over 100 at Nobeoka in Miyazaki Prefecture on Kyūshū, Japan, at the time the deadliest Japanese tornado since 1941. Less than two months later it was surpassed by the Saroma tornado which killed nine on November 7. The Nobeoka tornado damaged 1800 buildings and derailed an express train.

=== September 21–23 ===
FU	F0	F1	F2	F3	F4	F5
0	21	17	8	1	1	0

Another significant system produced severe weather from September 21 to 23 across a large swath of the Midwestern and Southern United States. 48 tornadoes were confirmed, making it one of the most significant non-tropical cyclone related outbreaks to occur in the month of September.

A moderate risk of severe weather was issued for September 22 for much of the region. The SPC received 43 tornado reports that day, mostly in Missouri, Illinois, Alabama and Arkansas, with significant damage and injuries reported. An F3 clipped the north edge of Metropolis, Illinois, and an F4 wedge devastated Crosstown, Missouri. Significant tornadoes were expected on September 23, particularly in the Mississippi Valley. However, only one tornado in Tennessee and two tornadoes in Michigan were confirmed, all of them being F0s. 12 people were killed by the event, but the deaths were not related to tornadoes.

== October ==
There were 62 tornadoes reported in the US, and 74 were confirmed in the end.

=== October 2 (Germany) ===
In Germany, at 1:45 a.m. CET (23:45 UTC) on October 2, a tornado struck the village of Quirla in Thuringia, causing major damage. Several houses lost their roofs, a few weaker walls collapsed, and forests were completely destroyed within the tornado path. It is rated as a lower F3 (T6) according to tree damage; damage to buildings is on upper F2 (T5) level. Three injuries were reported.

=== October 15–17 ===
A tropical system developed over the Gulf of Mexico on October 15. While high wind shear prevented it from becoming a tropical cyclone, the same wind shear allowed numerous tornadoes to develop over eastern Texas and Louisiana as it tracked northward early in the morning of October 16 and continued to produce severe weather throughout the day and into the morning of October 17. There were 20 tornadoes reported with at least 14 being confirmed – all of them F0 or F1 except for one in West Hattiesburg, Mississippi which was an F2 that did significant damage. Several injuries were reported while mobile homes and boats were destroyed. According to Accuweather there were three deaths reported in the severe weather outbreak (but not by tornadoes); two of them when their vehicle was submerged by flood waters while a third was killed in a rollover into a ditch.

=== October 18 ===
A mesoscale convective system associated with low-level instability, a low-level jet stream, and a surface baroclinic boundary produced a F2 tornado near Castellcir in the Catalonia region of Spain.

=== October 26–27 ===
A low pressure system over the central Plains produced a string of tornadoes across Kansas on October 26. The SPC reported 20 tornadoes, although many were likely duplicate reports. The Dodge City NWS office later posted in an article that 28 were spotted, with only 2 causing damage. One of the tornadoes was described as large. One hospital in Ulysses sustained significant roof damage while locally sheds were destroyed. The number of confirmed tornadoes is still undetermined and there were no injuries reported.

Several more tornadoes were reported on the morning of October 27 in the U.S. Gulf Coast from the same system. At least five were confirmed in Louisiana and Mississippi, all of them F1. Several more were reported in the Florida Panhandle.

== November ==
There were 53 tornadoes reported in the US in November, of which 42 were confirmed.

=== November 7 (Japan) ===
On November 7, 2006, a deadly tornado struck the town of Saroma, Hokkaidō in northern Japan. The tornado destroyed forty buildings. Nine people were confirmed dead and 26 people injured (seven seriously) as of November 9, 2006. Most of the casualties occurred at the work site for a tunnel, where the storm swept over prefabricated housing that was being used by workers. The Japan Meteorological Agency says the tornado is the deadliest ever recorded in Japan.

The previous recent most deadly tornado occurred September 18, 2006, killing three people on the southern island of Kyūshū. The agency's records only go back to 1961, however. The previous deadliest tornado struck Toyohashi City, Aichi Prefecture in 1941, killing 12; and the deadliest killed 16 in Miyazaki, Miyazaki Prefecture in 1881.

The November tornado also took out power to approximately 600 homes and destroyed 40 separate buildings. The meteorological agency estimates a wind speed for the tornado at more than F2 on the Fujita scale. The tornado was later confirmed as an F3. It was likely a low-mild F3 with winds around 160-165 mph, well built, conventional earthquake resistant homes lost their roofs and some walls and even conventional multi floor houses lost their stories as well, cars were thrown for a short distance and overturned, and poorly built structures were swept away entirely. Stronger reinforced-concrete buildings had partial roof collapse, all doors blown in, and total loss of glass windows; they also lost the entrances if they were not made of steel-reinforced concrete, patios were swept away, and garages were blown in.

=== November 7 (United States) ===
Several tornadoes touched down across parts of Central Florida on the afternoon of November 7, mostly in Seminole County. The strongest was a high-end F1. Moderate damage was reported in Goldenrod and Oviedo, with the worst being a mobile home that was destroyed. Two people were injured.

=== November 10 ===
An F1 tornado occurred in Fulton County, Arkansas during the afternoon of November 10. The path length was over 13 miles, and several mobile homes were damaged.

=== November 14–16 ===
FU	F0	F1	F2	F3	F4	F5
0	3	20	6	3	0	0

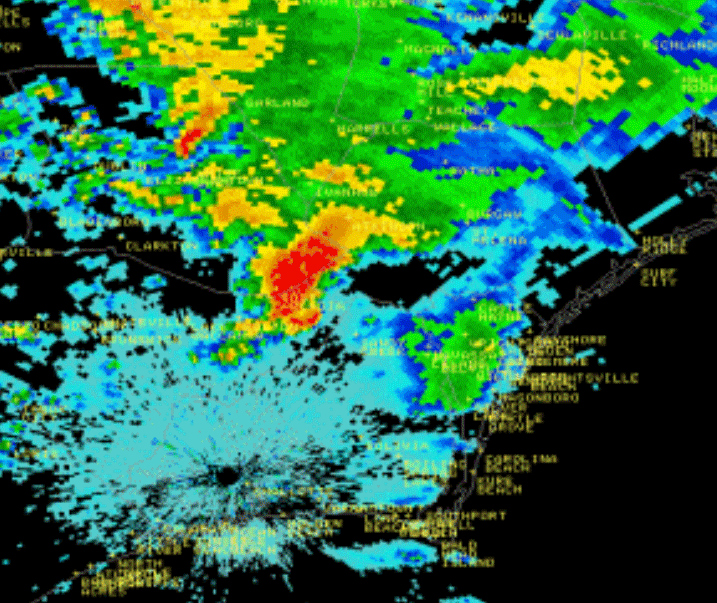
Composite Radar Reflectivity Image of the supercell thunderstorm that spawned the Riegelwood tornado.

A major severe weather event was expected over the U.S. Gulf Coast eastward into the Carolinas, especially beginning overnight on November 15, which was one year exactly after another significant outbreak farther north in 2005.

The initial wave of severe weather produced five reported tornadoes in Louisiana and Mississippi on November 15. At least 15 more tornadoes were reported in the overnight and morning hours. One tornado in Greensburg, Louisiana resulted in one death in a mobile home. Another significant tornado took place near Hattiesburg, Mississippi at 2:50 am CST (0850 UTC), where major structural damage was reported. At least eight people were injured in that tornado, which was confirmed as an F3. Numerous injuries and one fatality were also reported near Amite, Louisiana from an F2 tornado, and Palestine, Arkansas from straight-line winds. Another major F2 tornado took place at the east end of Montgomery, Alabama, where the Fun Zone Skate Center was destroyed with over 30 children inside. Only a few minor injuries were reported. Several other buildings suffered major damage as well.

The deadliest tornado of the outbreak occurred just outside Wilmington, North Carolina in the community of Riegelwood. Eight people were killed by this F3 tornado, including two children. In total, the storms resulted in 32 tornadoes and 13 deaths (including non-tornadic).

=== November 19-21 (Vietnam) ===
A extremely rare, unusual severe weather and tornado outbreak occurred across much of northern Vietnam. On November 19th, a brief tornado touchdown in Lục Nam, Bắc Ninh province, killing a child after a wall collapsed onto him. The next day saw two more tornadoes in Thái Nguyên and Phú Thọ provinces, killing another person. On November 21st, another, much more deadly tornado that would eventually killed 17, injuring over 50 other as it capsized many boats and ship before moving onshore. It also collapsed 2 large containers crane, sweeping 1 into the bay, resulting in one of the fatality in Cái Lân Port and Hạ Long Bay, Quảng Ninh province. Two more fatalities occurred inland after their house collapsed. A woman in Lan Hạ Bay, Hải Phòng province was also found deceased after her body washed ashore with her husband missing after their fishing boat capsized. The tornado also collapsing 150 booths at the 2006 Ha Long Trade Fair event in Hạ Long City. Over 200 homes were affected, 50 injuries, 19 deaths and 4 missing person were reported from the event as a whole, marking this the deadliest tornado outbreak event in country's history.

=== November 28 (Wales) ===
In the early hours of November 28 at 0115 UTC, the village of Bow Street in Wales was struck by an F1 tornado. There was moderate damage reported in the street to about 25 houses, along with extensive tree and power line damage. The tornado blocked the main route through the village (the A487 road) and damaged a railroad bridge. No injuries were reported.

=== November 30–December 1 ===
On the evening of November 30, a unique severe weather episode occurred across parts of west-central Alabama. Three tornadoes occurred in Marengo and Hale counties within a line of moderate showers. This convection did not contain any lightning or thunder. These showers were moving eastward around 50 miles an hour. The atmospheric environment was characterized by high wind shear—winds increasing and changing direction with increasing height. Several other counties reported wind damage (trees being blown down), including Tuscaloosa, Bibb and Jefferson counties. One of the tornadoes was rated F1. All of these storms occurred ahead of the Arctic cold front that was causing severe winter weather from the southern Great Plains into the mid-Mississippi River valley. The next day, a rare December tornado outbreak, part of a much more significant severe weather event, affected parts of northeastern Pennsylvania when several small lines or cells of thunderstorms affected the area during the afternoon. Five tornadoes were confirmed including, an F2 tornado in Luzerne County, Pennsylvania. This F2 tornado originated in Nescopeck Township, lifting up tractor trailers and campers, tossing them like toys. Several houses were also badly damaged. The tornado traveled 15 miles (24 km) into Mountain Top. One person was killed by a falling tree in Dauphin County.

== December ==
There were 40 tornadoes reported in the US in December, all of which were confirmed.

=== December 7 (England) ===
A surprise early December tornado during a squall line caused significant damage to portions of the suburb of Kensal Rise in North West London, United Kingdom. Numerous houses lost their roofs and one apartment building lost a portion of its facade. Extensive car and tree damage was reported. A car was also buried in the debris. In all, about 100 to 150 houses were affected, 29 of which were left inhabitable, and six people were injured. The tornado was rated T5 on the TORRO scale and F2 on the Fujita Scale. Two other weak tornadoes occurred in Belgium and the Netherlands.

=== December 25 ===
FU	F0	F1	F2	F3	F4	F5
0	1	0	4	0	0	0

After a lengthy period of inactivity, a moderate tornado event took place on Christmas Day in the southeastern United States, primarily in Florida. There were five tornadoes confirmed – four were rated F2 while the other was rated F0. One tornado destroyed several homes in Lake City, and significant tornadoes were also reported in Tampa, San Antonio, Daytona Beach, DeLand and in Leesburg. In all, over 250 houses were damaged and some were destroyed. Several people were injured but no fatalities were reported.

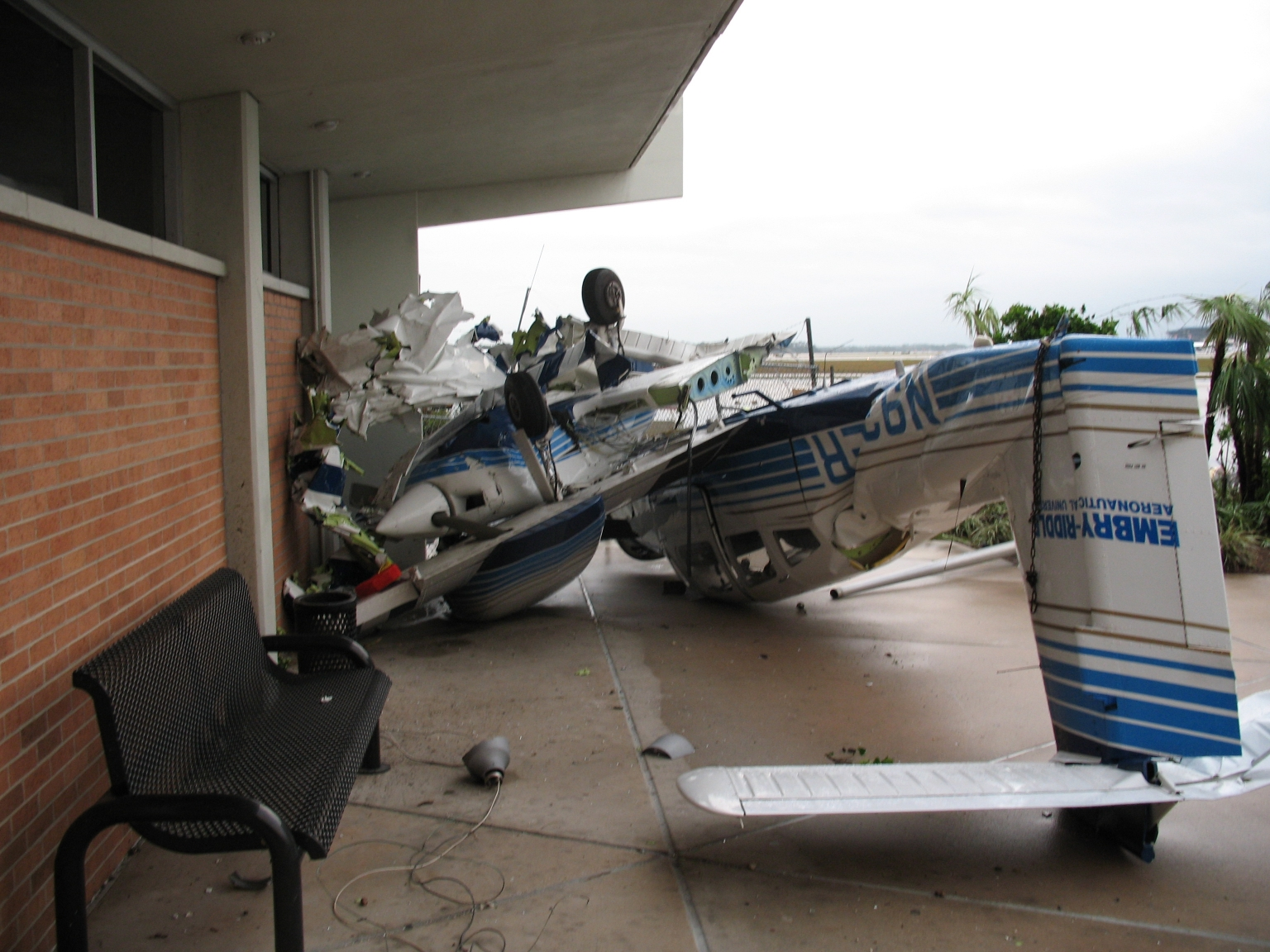
Remains of two Piper PA-44 Seminoles after an F2 tornado struck the Embry–Riddle Aeronautical University, Daytona Beach campus.

Very significant damage was done to the Embry–Riddle Aeronautical University's Daytona Beach campus as the F2 tornado that touched down in Daytona beach cut right through the heart of the campus. It obliterated 50 of the school's 75 aircraft, mostly Cessnas.

=== December 29–30 ===
A significant late-season severe weather event took place on December 29 in much of Texas. There were at least 22 tornadoes reported that day, many of them producing significant damage. The most severe tornado took place in Groesbeck in Limestone County, south of the Dallas-Fort Worth area, where at least one person was killed and 12 injured by a tornado. Severe damage was reported there.

The line squalled that evening, although one more tornado was reported early on December 30 in Louisiana.

=== December 30 (England) ===
Several tornadoes occurred across southern and eastern England associated with supercells and quasi-linear structures.

=== December 31 (Northern Ireland) ===
A tornado struck County Armagh, Northern Ireland, causing some minor structural damage. This was followed by one of the worst New Year's Eve storms in many years. Three people were injured in the tornado.

== See also ==
- Weather of 2006
- Tornado
  - Tornadoes by year
  - Tornado records
  - Tornado climatology
  - Tornado myths
- List of tornado outbreaks
  - List of F5 and EF5 tornadoes
  - List of F4 and EF4 tornadoes
  - List of North American tornadoes and tornado outbreaks
  - List of 21st-century Canadian tornadoes and tornado outbreaks
  - List of European tornadoes and tornado outbreaks
  - List of tornadoes and tornado outbreaks in Asia
  - List of Southern Hemisphere tornadoes and tornado outbreaks
  - List of tornadoes striking downtown areas
  - List of tornadoes with confirmed satellite tornadoes
- Tornado intensity
  - Fujita scale
  - Enhanced Fujita scale
  - International Fujita scale
  - TORRO scale
