= Twin Oaks, Oklahoma =

Unincorporated community in Oklahoma, US

- Census-designated place
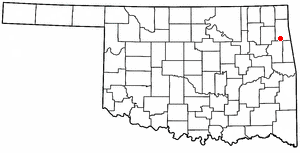
- Location of Twin Oaks, Oklahoma
- Coordinates: 36°11′51″N 94°50′16″W
- Country: United States
- State: Oklahoma
- County: Delaware

Area
  - Total: 5.34 sq mi (13.82 km^{2})
  - Land: 5.34 sq mi (13.82 km^{2})
  - Water: 0 sq mi (0.00 km^{2})
- Elevation: 1,125 ft (343 m)

Population (2020)
  - Total: 328
  - Density: 61.5/sq mi (23.73/km^{2})
- Time zone: UTC-6 (Central (CST))
  - Summer (DST): UTC-5 (CDT)
- ZIP code: 74368
- Area codes: 539/918
- FIPS code: 40-75600
- GNIS feature ID: 2409375

Twin Oaks is an unincorporated community and census-designated place (CDP) in Delaware County, Oklahoma, United States. As of the 2020 census, Twin Oaks had a population of 328. A tornado hit the town on March 12, 2006, destroying 42 homes and injuring 8 people in Delaware County.

== Geography ==
Twin Oaks is located in southern Delaware County and is bordered to the northeast by the town of Kansas.

According to the United States Census Bureau, the Twin Oaks CDP has a total area of 2.4 square miles (6.2 km^{2}), all land.

== Demographics ==
Historical population
Census	Pop.	Note	%±
2020	328		—
U.S. Decennial Census

=== 2020 census ===
As of the 2020 census, Twin Oaks had a population of 328. The median age was 38.5 years. 22.3% of residents were under the age of 18 and 17.1% of residents were 65 years of age or older. For every 100 females there were 94.1 males, and for every 100 females age 18 and over there were 84.8 males age 18 and over.

0.0% of residents lived in urban areas, while 100.0% lived in rural areas.

There were 125 households in Twin Oaks, of which 33.6% had children under the age of 18 living in them. Of all households, 54.4% were married-couple households, 17.6% were households with a male householder and no spouse or partner present, and 25.6% were households with a female householder and no spouse or partner present. About 22.4% of all households were made up of individuals and 11.2% had someone living alone who was 65 years of age or older.

There were 141 housing units, of which 11.3% were vacant. The homeowner vacancy rate was 0.0% and the rental vacancy rate was 0.0%.

Racial composition as of the 2020 census
Race	Number	Percent
White	121	36.9%
Black or African American	0	0.0%
American Indian and Alaska Native	166	50.6%
Asian	1	0.3%
Native Hawaiian and Other Pacific Islander	0	0.0%
Some other race	2	0.6%
Two or more races	38	11.6%
Hispanic or Latino (of any race)	9	2.7%

=== 2000 census ===
As of the census of 2000, there were 186 people, 63 households, and 49 families residing in the CDP. The population density was 77.8 inhabitants per square mile (30.0/km^{2}). There were 65 housing units at an average density of 27.2 per square mile (10.5/km^{2}). The racial makeup of the CDP was 35.48% White, 59.68% Native American, 0.54% from other races, and 4.30% from two or more races. Hispanic or Latino of any race were 1.61% of the population.

There were 63 households, out of which 41.3% had children under the age of 18 living with them, 61.9% were married couples living together, 11.1% had a female householder with no husband present, and 22.2% were non-families. 22.2% of all households were made up of individuals, and 7.9% had someone living alone who was 65 years of age or older. The average household size was 2.95 and the average family size was 3.45.

In the CDP, the population was spread out, with 29.6% under the age of 18, 10.8% from 18 to 24, 33.3% from 25 to 44, 18.3% from 45 to 64, and 8.1% who were 65 years of age or older. The median age was 30 years. For every 100 females, there were 102.2 males. For every 100 females age 18 and over, there were 95.5 males.

The median income for a household in the CDP was $26,818, and the median income for a family was $28,750. Males had a median income of $25,167 versus $16,607 for females. The per capita income for the CDP was $8,334. About 29.2% of families and 39.1% of the population were below the poverty line, including 55.0% of those under the age of eighteen and none of those 65 or over.

== Education ==
One part is in the Leach Public School school district, while another part is in the Kansas Public Schools school district.
