= Womack, Missouri =

Unincorporated community in Missouri, U.S.

Coordinates: 37°40′52″N 90°11′47″W

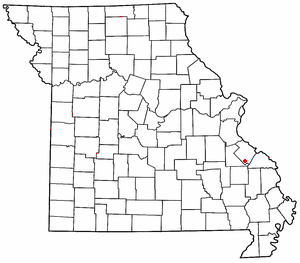

Womack is an unincorporated community in Saline Township in the extreme southern part of Sainte Genevieve County, Missouri, United States. It is located approximately twenty miles southwest of Sainte Genevieve. Womack's post office is closed, with mail now delivered from Fredericktown.

The community was founded in 1895 and is named for R. M. Womack, the first postmaster.
