= Lục Nam =

- Ward
- Location in Vietnam
- Coordinates: 21°18′43″N 106°23′45″E
- Country: Vietnam
- City: Bắc Ninh
- Established: 18 February 1997

Area
  - Total: 1.76 sq mi (4.57 km^{2})

Population
  - Total: 5,987
  - Density: 3,400/sq mi (1,310/km^{2})
- Time zone: UTC+07:00

Lục Nam is a ward (phường) of Bắc Ninh city, in north-eastern Vietnam.
