= Harkes, Missouri =

Unincorporated community in Missouri, US

Coordinates: 39°20′54″N 92°28′51″W

Harkes is an unincorporated community in south-central Randolph County, in the U.S. state of Missouri. Harkes is located on Missouri Route A, approximately midway between Moberly and Higbee. The community is near the headwaters of Moniteau Creek.

== History ==
Variant names were "Elliot" and "Wilcox". The present name is after one Mr. Harkes, a businessperson in the local mining industry.
