= Higbee, Missouri =

- City
- City of Higbee
- Location of Higbee shown in Missouri
- Coordinates: 39°18′21″N 92°30′48″W
- Country: United States
- State: Missouri
- County: Randolph
- Incorporated: 1891

Area
  - Total: 0.40 sq mi (1.03 km^{2})
  - Land: 0.40 sq mi (1.03 km^{2})
  - Water: 0 sq mi (0.00 km^{2})
- Elevation: 879 ft (268 m)

Population (2020)
  - Total: 459
  - Density: 1,158.4/sq mi (447.28/km^{2})
- Time zone: UTC-6 (Central (CST))
  - Summer (DST): UTC-5 (CDT)
- ZIP code: 65257
- Area code: 660
- FIPS code: 29-31924
- GNIS feature ID: 2394372
- Website: cityofhigbee.com

Higbee is a city in southern Randolph County, Missouri, United States. As of the 2020 census, Higbee had a population of 459. Barrel-making company A&K Cooperage, Barrel 53 Cooperage and Woodsmen Distilling are based in Higbee.

== History ==
The first settlement at Higbee was made in 1872. A post office called Higbee has been in operation since 1873. The community has the name of Joseph Higbee, a pioneer settler.

== Geography ==
Higbee is located approximately two miles north of the Randolph - Howard county line at the intersection of Missouri Routes A and B. Moniteau Creek flows past two miles to the east. Moberly lies eight miles to the northeast.

According to the United States Census Bureau, the city has a total area of 0.43 square miles (1.11 km^{2}), all land.

== Demographics ==
Historical population
Census	Pop.	Note	%±
1880	347		—
1890	1,093		215.0%
1900	1,151		5.3%
1910	1,215		5.6%
1920	1,400		15.2%
1930	915		−34.6%
1940	877		−4.2%
1950	674		−23.1%
1960	646		−4.2%
1970	641		−0.8%
1980	817		27.5%
1990	639		−21.8%
2000	623		−2.5%
2010	568		−8.8%
2020	459		−19.2%
U.S. Decennial Census

=== 2010 census ===
As of the census of 2010, there were 568 people, 235 households, and 157 families living in the city. The population density was 1,320.9 inhabitants per square mile (510.0/km^{2}). There were 273 housing units at an average density of 634.9 per square mile (245.1/km^{2}). The racial makeup of the city was 96.8% White, 0.4% African American, and 2.8% from two or more races. Hispanic or Latino of any race were 0.4% of the population.

There were 235 households, of which 30.6% had children under the age of 18 living with them, 49.4% were married couples living together, 12.3% had a female householder with no husband present, 5.1% had a male householder with no wife present, and 33.2% were non-families. 27.2% of all households were made up of individuals, and 12.3% had someone living alone who was 65 years of age or older. The average household size was 2.42 and the average family size was 2.96.

The median age in the city was 41.2 years. 23.6% of residents were under the age of 18; 8.5% were between the ages of 18 and 24; 23.4% were from 25 to 44; 28.7% were from 45 to 64; and 15.8% were 65 years of age or older. The gender makeup of the city was 48.4% male and 51.6% female.

=== 2000 census ===
As of the census of 2000, there were 623 people, 264 households, and 170 families living in the city. The population density was 1,453.6 inhabitants per square mile (561.2/km^{2}). There were 300 housing units at an average density of 699.9 per square mile (270.2/km^{2}). The racial makeup of the city was 96.79% White, 2.25% African American, 0.32% Native American, 0.16% from other races, and 0.48% from two or more races. Hispanic or Latino of any race were 1.28% of the population.

There were 264 households, out of which 28.0% had children under the age of 18 living with them, 47.7% were married couples living together, 11.7% had a female householder with no husband present, and 35.6% were non-families. 31.1% of all households were made up of individuals, and 14.4% had someone living alone who was 65 years of age or older. The average household size was 2.36 and the average family size was 2.92.

In the city the population was spread out, with 25.5% under the age of 18, 7.9% from 18 to 24, 27.3% from 25 to 44, 23.4% from 45 to 64, and 15.9% who were 65 years of age or older. The median age was 39 years. For every 100 females there were 94.7 males. For every 100 females age 18 and over, there were 98.3 males.

The median income for a household in the city was $26,813, and the median income for a family was $31,806. Males had a median income of $26,477 versus $20,694 for females. The per capita income for the city was $16,709. About 10.2% of families and 13.3% of the population were below the poverty line, including 17.2% of those under age 18 and 13.4% of those age 65 or over.

== Education ==
The city is served by the Higbee R-VIII Public School District, including Higbee High School, Higbee Middle School, and Higbee Elementary School.

== Public safety ==
Higbee is served by the Higbee Area Fire Protection District.

== Notable people ==
- Omar Bradley (February 12, 1893 - August 8, 1981) One of the main U.S. Army field commanders in North Africa and Europe during World War II and a General of the Army of the United States Army.
- Elgin Lessley (June 10, 1883 - January 10, 1944) An important American cameraman of the silent film era, who was famous for his groundbreaking special effects and often worked with Buster Keaton.
