= Renick, Missouri =

City in Randolph County, Missouri, United States

- Village
- Location of Renick, Missouri
- Coordinates: 39°20′30″N 92°24′40″W
- Country: United States
- State: Missouri
- County: Randolph

Area
  - Total: 0.36 sq mi (0.93 km^{2})
  - Land: 0.36 sq mi (0.93 km^{2})
  - Water: 0 sq mi (0.00 km^{2})
- Elevation: 873 ft (266 m)

Population (2020)
  - Total: 154
  - Density: 426.8/sq mi (164.79/km^{2})
- Time zone: UTC-6 (Central (CST))
  - Summer (DST): UTC-5 (CDT)
- ZIP code: 65278
- Area code: 660
- FIPS code: 29-61166
- GNIS feature ID: 2399057

Renick is a village in Randolph County, Missouri, United States. As of the 2020 census, Renick had a population of 154.

== History ==
Renick was first named "Randolph", and was founded under this name in 1856. A post office called Randolph was established in 1858, and the name was changed to Renick in 1884. The present name is after one Mr. Renick, a railroad man.

=== Civil War ===
Randolph County was home to much Confederate Guerrilla action. Renick was prone to the action, as it was a railroad hub and seen as vulnerable.

In 1862, After the Battle of Roans Tan Yard, wounded troops of the Union side were treated in Renick.

William T. Anderson was infamous for causing trouble in the county. Sometime during the summer of 1864, Anderson and some 65 Confederate Guerrilas raided Renick and burned the station that sat next to the railroad.

== Geography ==
According to the United States Census Bureau, the village has a total area of 0.20 square miles (0.52 km^{2}), all land.

== Demographics ==
Historical population
Census	Pop.	Note	%±
1880	460		—
1890	437		−5.0%
1900	196		−55.1%
1910	213		8.7%
1920	218		2.3%
1930	195		−10.6%
1940	155		−20.5%
1950	157		1.3%
1960	190		21.0%
1970	188		−1.1%
1980	195		3.7%
1990	195		0.0%
2000	221		13.3%
2010	172		−22.2%
2020	154		−10.5%
U.S. Decennial Census

=== 2010 census ===
As of the census of 2010, there were 172 people, 70 households, and 51 families living in the village. The population density was 860.0 inhabitants per square mile (332.0/km^{2}). There were 75 housing units at an average density of 375.0 per square mile (144.8/km^{2}). The racial makeup of the village was 99.4% White and 0.6% African American. Hispanic or Latino of any race were 1.7% of the population.

There were 70 households, of which 31.4% had children under the age of 18 living with them, 61.4% were married couples living together, 8.6% had a female householder with no husband present, 2.9% had a male householder with no wife present, and 27.1% were non-families. 21.4% of all households were made up of individuals, and 5.8% had someone living alone who was 65 years of age or older. The average household size was 2.46 and the average family size was 2.86.

The median age in the village was 42.7 years. 23.3% of residents were under the age of 18; 9.3% were between the ages of 18 and 24; 19.2% were from 25 to 44; 31.4% were from 45 to 64; and 16.9% were 65 years of age or older. The gender makeup of the village was 52.3% male and 47.7% female.

=== 2000 census ===
As of the census of 2000, there were 221 people, 82 households, and 59 families living in the village. The population density was 1,105.4 inhabitants per square mile (426.8/km^{2}). There were 93 housing units at an average density of 465.2 per square mile (179.6/km^{2}). The racial makeup of the village was 95.48% White, 0.90% Native American, and 3.62% from two or more races.

There were 82 households, out of which 37.8% had children under the age of 18 living with them, 53.7% were married couples living together, 12.2% had a female householder with no husband present, and 28.0% were non-families. 23.2% of all households were made up of individuals, and 7.3% had someone living alone who was 65 years of age or older. The average household size was 2.70 and the average family size was 3.22.

In the village, the population was spread out, with 30.8% under the age of 18, 5.9% from 18 to 24, 26.7% from 25 to 44, 26.7% from 45 to 64, and 10.0% who were 65 years of age or older. The median age was 36 years. For every 100 females, there were 93.9 males. For every 100 females age 18 and over, there were 98.7 males.

The median income for a household in the village was $30,313, and the median income for a family was $37,500. Males had a median income of $25,625 versus $20,714 for females. The per capita income for the village was $12,549. About 10.0% of families and 10.8% of the population were below the poverty line, including 11.8% of those under the age of eighteen and 14.3% of those 65 or over.

== Education ==
The Renick R-V school district serves students pre-K through 8th grade. The district consists of one elementary/middle school building. For high school, students may attend any school in Randolph County or any surrounding county. Most students attend Moberly High School, Sturgeon High School, or Higbee High School.

== See also ==
- List of cities in Missouri
- Sam Renick, jockey
