= Moberly Commercial Historic District =

Historic district in Missouri, United States

- U.S. National Register of Historic Places
- U.S. Historic district
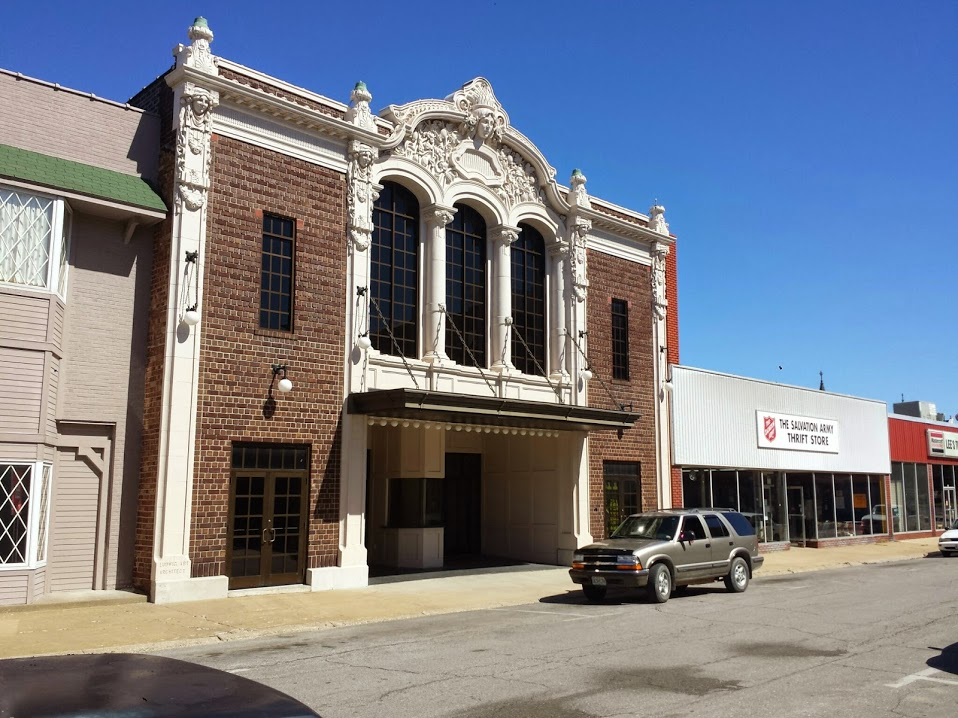
- 4th Street Theater, May 2015

- Location within Missouri Location within the United States
- Location: Roughly bounded by W. Coates, W. Rollins, N. Clark, & Johnson Sts., Moberly, Missouri
- Coordinates: 39°24′52″N 92°26′27″W
- Area: 20 acres (8.1 ha)
- Built: 1880
- Architect: Abt, Ludwig
- Architectural style: Italianate, Neo-Classical Revival, Colonial Revival
- NRHP reference No.: 12000592
- Added to NRHP: September 4, 2012

Moberly Commercial Historic District is a national historic district located at Moberly, Randolph County, Missouri. The district encompasses 89 contributing buildings in the central business district of Moberly. It developed between about 1880 and 1963, and includes representative examples of Classical Revival, Colonial Revival, and Italianate style architecture. Notable buildings include the former Moberly Post Office (1915), Moberly Masonic Lodge, No. 344/Israel Shrine #13 (1929), Fourth Street Theatre (1913), and Carnegie Library (1903).

It was listed on the National Register of Historic Places in 2012.
