= High Hill, Missouri =

City in Montgomery County, Missouri, United States

- City
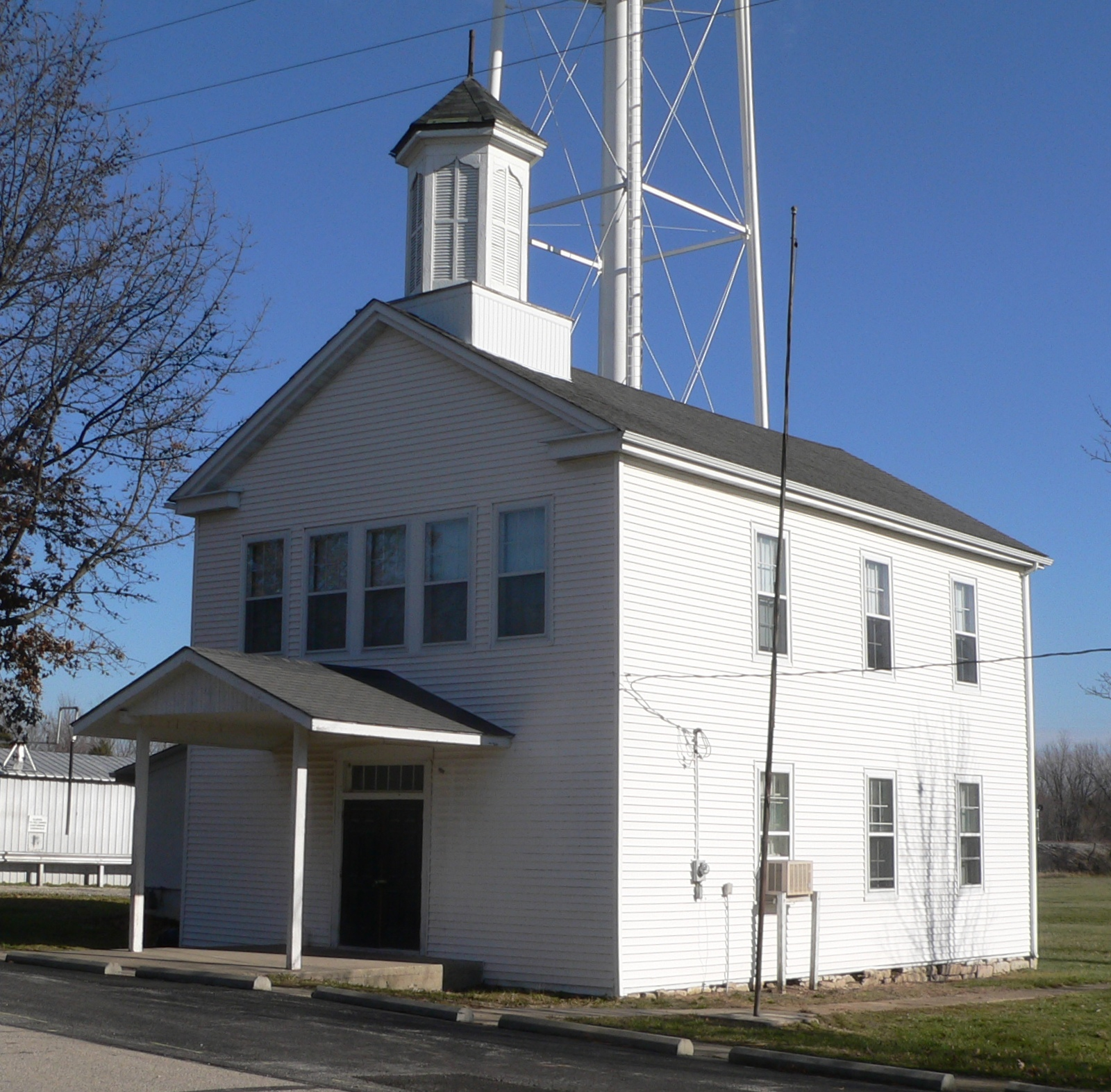
- Post Office City Hall High Hill School

- Location in Montgomery County and the state of Missouri
- Coordinates: 38°52′31″N 91°22′40″W
- Country: United States
- State: Missouri
- County: Montgomery

Area
  - Total: 0.46 sq mi (1.19 km^{2})
  - Land: 0.46 sq mi (1.19 km^{2})
  - Water: 0 sq mi (0.00 km^{2})
- Elevation: 896 ft (273 m)

Population (2020)
  - Total: 186
  - Density: 404.7/sq mi (156.27/km^{2})
- Time zone: UTC-6 (Central (CST))
  - Summer (DST): UTC-5 (CDT)
- ZIP code: 63350
- Area code: 636
- FIPS code: 29-31996
- GNIS feature ID: 2394374

High Hill is a city in Montgomery County, Missouri, United States. The population was 186 at the 2020 census.

== History ==
A post office called High Hill has been in operation since 1837. The community was so named on account of its lofty elevation.

Farmers Mercantile Co. Building and High Hill School are listed on the National Register of Historic Places.

== Geography ==
High Hill is in eastern Montgomery County, adjacent to Interstate 70. The city is accessible from the expressway via Highway F at exit 179. I-70 leads west 4 miles (6 km) to New Florence and east 5 miles (8 km) to Jonesburg. St. Louis is 75 miles (121 km) to the east, and Columbia is 55 miles (89 km) to the west. The Norfolk Southern Railway passes through the city, leading east to St. Louis and northwest to Moberly and thence to Kansas City.

According to the U.S. Census Bureau, High Hill has a total area of 0.46 square miles (1.19 km^{2}), all land. The ridge on which the city sits drains north toward Bear Creek, a tributary of the West Fork of the Cuivre River, which continues east to the Mississippi; and south to a different Bear Creek, a tributary of the Loutre River, which continues south to the Missouri River.

== Demographics ==
Historical population
Census	Pop.	Note	%±
1880	223		—
1920	253		—
1930	244		−3.6%
1940	188		−23.0%
1950	224		19.1%
1960	173		−22.8%
1970	192		11.0%
1980	254		32.3%
1990	204		−19.7%
2000	231		13.2%
2010	195		−15.6%
2020	186		−4.6%
U.S. Decennial Census

=== 2010 census ===
As of the census of 2010, there were 195 people, 85 households, and 51 families living in the city. The population density was 423.9 inhabitants per square mile (163.7/km^{2}). There were 102 housing units at an average density of 221.7 per square mile (85.6/km^{2}). The racial makeup of the city was 95.9% White, 1.0% Native American, 2.1% Asian, 0.5% from other races, and 0.5% from two or more races. Hispanic or Latino of any race were 1.0% of the population.

There were 85 households, of which 28.2% had children under the age of 18 living with them, 48.2% were married couples living together, 8.2% had a female householder with no husband present, 3.5% had a male householder with no wife present, and 40.0% were non-families. 36.5% of all households were made up of individuals, and 18.8% had someone living alone who was 65 years of age or older. The average household size was 2.29 and the average family size was 2.98.

The median age in the city was 43.9 years. 20.5% of residents were under the age of 18; 5.2% were between the ages of 18 and 24; 25.1% were from 25 to 44; 27.7% were from 45 to 64; and 21.5% were 65 years of age or older. The gender makeup of the city was 51.3% male and 48.7% female.

=== 2000 census ===
As of the census of 2000, there were 231 people, 102 households, and 62 families living in the city. The population density was 502.2 inhabitants per square mile (193.9/km^{2}). There were 120 housing units at an average density of 260.9 per square mile (100.7/km^{2}). The racial makeup of the city was 96.10% White, 0.43% Native American, 1.30% Asian, and 2.16% from two or more races.

There were 102 households, out of which 27.5% had children under the age of 18 living with them, 49.0% were married couples living together, 6.9% had a female householder with no husband present, and 39.2% were non-families. 35.3% of all households were made up of individuals, and 21.6% had someone living alone who was 65 years of age or older. The average household size was 2.26 and the average family size was 2.98.

In the city, the population was spread out, with 22.9% under the age of 18, 10.4% from 18 to 24, 18.2% from 25 to 44, 29.9% from 45 to 64, and 18.6% who were 65 years of age or older. The median age was 44 years. For every 100 females, there were 97.4 males. For every 100 females age 18 and over, there were 95.6 males.

The median income for a household in the city was $31,429, and the median income for a family was $36,250. Males had a median income of $32,500 versus $17,188 for females. The per capita income for the city was $18,155. About 4.7% of families and 10.7% of the population were below the poverty line, including 2.6% of those under the age of eighteen and 22.2% of those sixty-five or over.

== Education ==
It is in the Montgomery County R-II School District.

== See also ==
- List of cities in Missouri
