= Moberly Junior High School =

- U.S. National Register of Historic Places
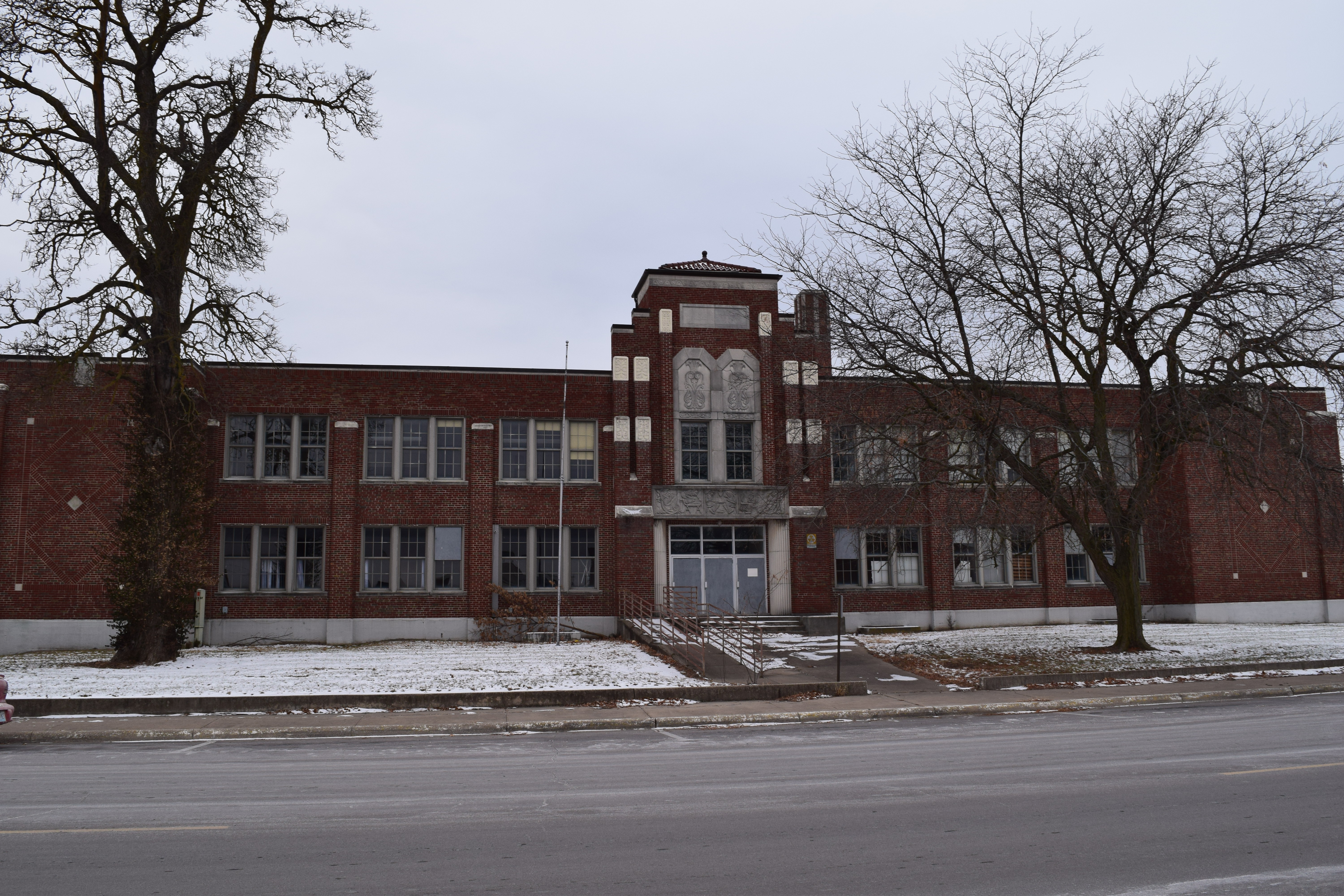

- Location within Missouri Location within the United States
- Location: 101 N Johnson St., Moberly, Missouri
- Coordinates: 39°25′9″N 92°26′37″W
- Area: less than one acre
- Built: 1917, 1930
- Built by: Peterson, Lawrence
- Architect: Abt, Ludwig
- Architectural style: Art Deco
- NRHP reference No.: 07001340
- Added to NRHP: January 4, 2008

Moberly Junior High School is a historic school building located at 101 N Johnson Street, in Moberly, Randolph County, Missouri, that was used until 1997. The main block was built in 1929, and is a two-story, H-shaped, brick building with simple Art Deco styling. The rear auditorium wing was built in 1917 and was originally an addition to an older school that burned. The auditorium and gymnasium wing was demolished in August 2018. In 2024, renovations began to turn the school into a senior living community, with 40 units.

The school was listed on the National Register of Historic Places in 2008.
