= Burkholder-O'Keefe House =

Historic house in Missouri, United States

- U.S. National Register of Historic Places
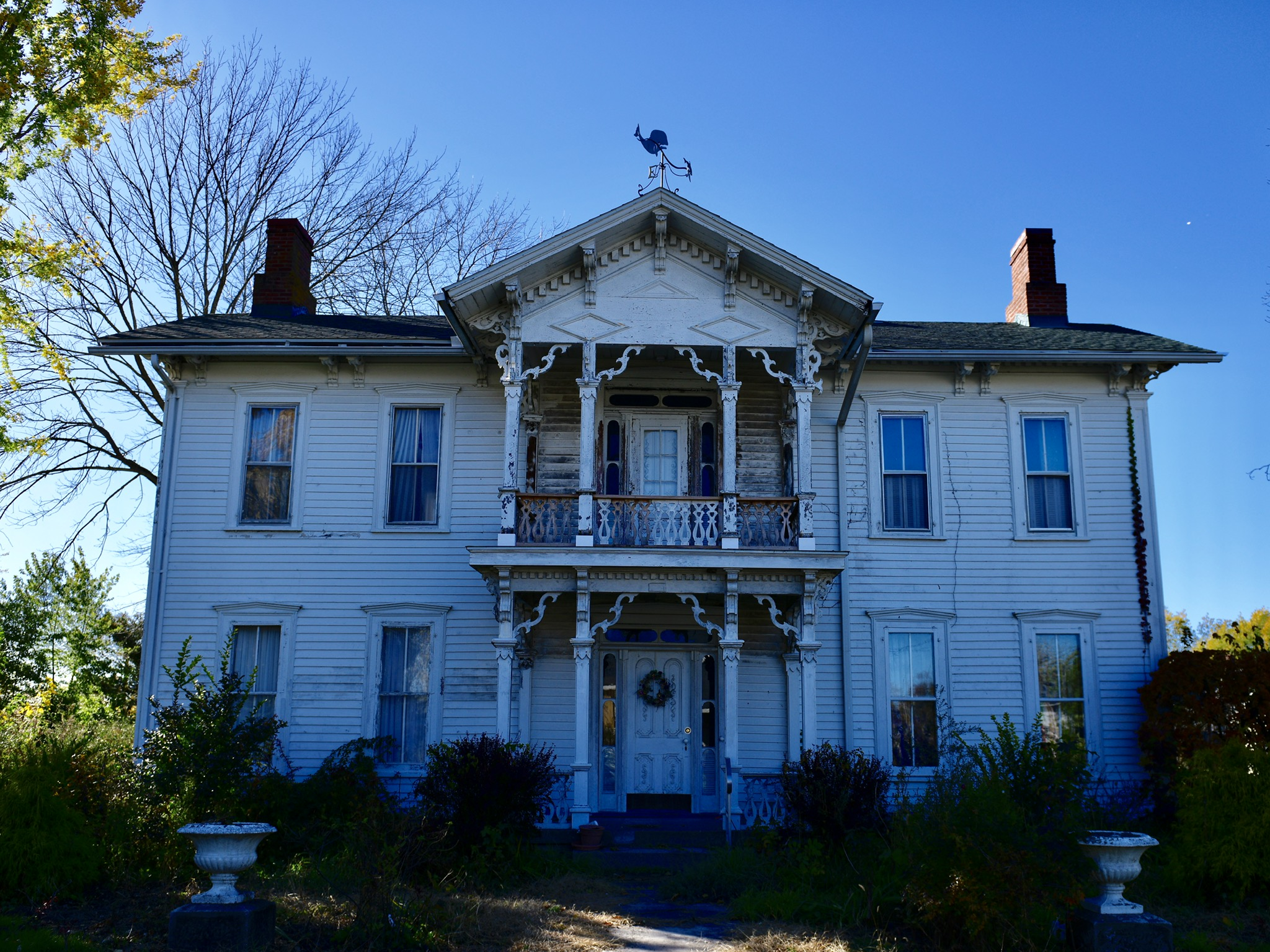

- Location within Missouri Location within the United States
- Location: 605 S. Fifth St. Moberly, Missouri
- Coordinates: 39°24′52″N 92°26′30″W
- Area: less than one acre
- Built: 1872
- Architectural style: Italianate, I-house
- NRHP reference No.: 89001414
- Added to NRHP: September 25, 1989

Burkholder-O'Keefe House is a historic home located at Moberly, Randolph County, Missouri. It was built in 1872, and is a two-story, Italianate style frame I-house. It features a two-story front porch with gable roof. It is one of the oldest surviving houses in Moberly.

It was listed on the National Register of Historic Places in 1989.
