= Fort McHenry (disambiguation) =

Fort McHenry is a fort in Baltimore, Maryland

Fort McHenry may also refer to:

- Fort McHenry, Baltimore
- Fort McHenry (Mississippi Territory), formerly the Spanish Fort Nogales
- USS Fort McHenry, a dock landing ship
- Bethlehem Fort McHenry Shipyard, Baltimore, a former shipyard
- Fort McHenry Tunnel, a traffic tunnel in Baltimore

== See also ==
- Fort Henry (disambiguation)
