= KMBY =

KMBY may refer to:

- KMBY (AM), a radio station (1240 AM) licensed to serve Monterey, California, United States
- KMBY-LD, a low-power television station (channel 27) licensed to serve Monterey
- KBNY-LD, a low-power digital television station (channel 29, virtual 19) licensed to serve Monterey, which held the call sign KMBY-LD from 2010 to 2023
- KDFG, a radio station (103.9 FM) licensed to serve Seaside, California, which used the call sign KMBY-FM from September 2002 to February 2008
- KHIP, a radio station (104.3 FM) licensed to serve Gonzales, California, which used the call sign KMBY-FM from November 1995 to September 2002
- KSES-FM, a radio station (107.1 FM) licensed to serve Seaside, which used the call sign KMBY-FM from September 1993 to July 1994
- Omar N. Bradley Airport (ICAO code KMBY)
