= Sweet Spring Creek =

Stream in the American state of Missouri

Sweet Spring Creek is a stream in Randolph County in the U.S. state of Missouri. It is a tributary of the East Fork Little Chariton River.

The stream headwaters arise within the western part of Moberly at 39°25′22″N 92°27′08″W at an elevation of approximately 850 feet. The stream meanders to the west for approximately 12 miles essentially parallel to and about three miles south of US Route 24. It reaches its confluence with the Little Chariton approximately 1.5 miles south-southeast of the community of Clifton Hill. The confluence is at 39°24′50″N 92°39′23″W at an elevation of 653 feet.

Sweet Spring Creek was so named on account of its sweet-tasting, clean water.

== See also ==
- List of rivers of Missouri
