= Mud Creek (Middle Fork Salt River tributary) =

Stream in the U.S. state of Missouri

Mud Creek is a stream in the Randolph and Monroe counties of north central Missouri. It is a tributary of Middle Fork Salt River. The stream headwaters are in Northeast Randolph County just northeast of Cairo and U. S. Route 63. The stream flows northeast then turns southeast as it passes Levicks Mill. The stream turns east as it enters Monroe County just to the northwest of Ash. The stream meanders eastward passing under Missouri Route 151 reaching its confluence with the Middle Fork of the Salt River about three miles northwest of Holiday.

The stream source is at 39°30′31″N 92°26′29″W and the confluence is at 39°32′44″N 92°14′00″W.

Mud Creek was so named on account of muddy banks.

== See also ==
- List of rivers of Missouri
