= Levick Mill, Missouri =

Unincorporated community in Missouri, U.S.

Coordinates: 39°34′34″N 92°20′48″W

Levick Mill is an unincorporated community in northeast Randolph County, in the U.S. state of Missouri.

The mill site is adjacent to Mud Creek on Missouri Route J in the northeast corner of the county.

== History ==
Variant names were "Levicks Mill" and "Pattonsburg". A post office called Levicks Mill was established in 1872, and remained in operation until 1903. The community has the name of Abram Levick, the proprietor of a local mill.
