= Siege of Fort Henry =

Siege of Fort Henry may refer to:

- Siege of Pemaquid (1696), a siege of Fort William Henry near modern-day Bristol, Maine during King William's War
- Siege of Fort William Henry, a 1757 siege during the French and Indian War on the frontier between the British Province of New York and the French Province of Canada
- Siege of Fort Henry (1777), a siege during the American Revolutionary War, in Virginia
- Siege of Fort Henry (1782), a siege during the American Revolutionary War, in Virginia

== See also ==
- Battle of Fort Henry, a battle in 1862 during the American Civil War in Middle Tennessee
- Fort Henry (disambiguation)
