= Randolph Springs, Missouri =

Unincorporated community in Missouri, U.S.

Coordinates: 39°25′26″N 92°36′19″W

Randolph Springs is an unincorporated community in Randolph County, in the U.S. state of Missouri.

== History ==
A post office called Randolph Springs was established in 1888, and remained in operation until 1902. The community took its name from a mineral spring near the original town site.
