= Omar N. Bradley Airport =

Airport in Moberly, Missouri

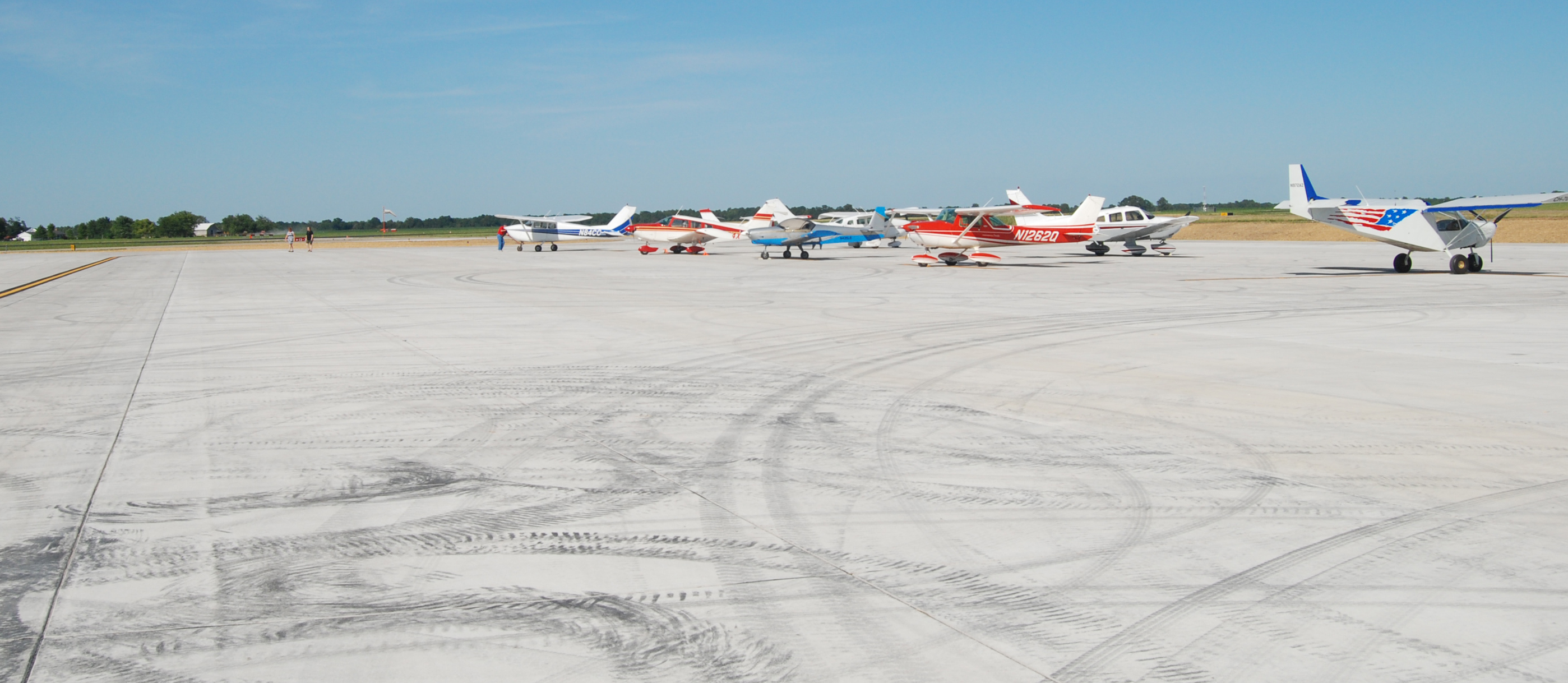
- IATA: MBY; ICAO: KMBY

Summary
- Airport type: Public
- Owner: City of Moberly
- Location: Moberly, Missouri
- Elevation AMSL: 866 ft / 264 m
- Coordinates: 39°27′52″N 092°25′42″W
- Website: https://www.moberlymo.org/321/Omar-N-Bradley-Regional-Airport

Map

Runways
Direction	Length		Surface
Direction	ft	m	Surface
13/31	5,000	1,524	Concrete
05/23	3,350	1,021	Concrete

Statistics (2021)
- Airport operations: ~47 per day

Omar N. Bradley Airport (IATA:MBY, ICAO:KMBY) is a public airport located in Moberly, Missouri. The airport is named after 5 star general Omar Bradley, who was born in Randolph County. The airport does not serve any airline.

According to the FCC, in 2019, 3 encampments of commercial airlines were at the airport.

== History ==
The first airport in Moberly was started by Clinton Linneman and Leo Hutchinson in 1927.

In 1938, a group of men in Moberly interested in aviation formed the Moberly Airport Association, starting the airport (then known as Moberly Municipal Airport).

In 1943, the city council changed the airports name to Omar N. Bradley Airport, calling him "Moberly's favorite son".

In February 1961, Moberly voters approved a $62,999 bond for airport improvements. In April 1964, when the construction finished, the airport was dedicated after Omar Bradley. He was a guest of honor at the dedication. With the improvements, the Ozark Air Lines began servicing the airport giving Randolph County's first and only passenger and mail services until they discontinued services in 1986.

In early 2007, the airport and the surrounding town of Moberly were hit by a destructive storm, blowing the roofs off hangars.

In February 2019, a leak in one of the hangars gave 3 people carbon monoxide poisoning, injuring 2 and killing one.

In June 2024, the annual Air Race Classic, a transcontinental women's air race, had a stop at the airport.

== Facilities ==
Omar N. Bradley Regional Airport covers an area of 285 acres (115 ha) at an elevation of 866 feet above mean sea level. It has two runways: 13/31 is 5,000 by 75 feet with a concrete surface and 5/23 is 3,350 by 60 feet (1,021 x 15 m) with a concrete surface.

For the 12-month period ending December 31, 2021, the airport had an average of 47 aircraft operations per day: 95% general aviation, 4% air taxi, and <1% military. At that time there were 31 aircraft based at this airport: 28 single-engine, 2 multi-engine, and one jet plane.

== Incidents ==
- On May 8, 1977, a Piper PA-11 failed to reach takeoff speed and crashed. The sole passenger, a 58-year-old man, was killed from the crash.
- On November 8, 1993, a Cessna 172 crashed. The pilot reportedly thought the end of the runway was coming too quick and aborted the landing, causing the plane to nose over and crash into a ditch. Only minor injuries were reported.
