= Milton, Randolph County, Missouri =

Unincorporated community in Missouri, U.S.

Coordinates: 39°28′12″N 92°19′45″W

Milton is an unincorporated community in Randolph County, in the U.S. state of Missouri. An old variant name was "Firth".

== History ==
Milton was laid out in 1836, and named after Milton, North Carolina, the native home of a first settler. A post office called Milton was established in 1840, and closed temporarily in 1872. Upon reopening, the post office was renamed in order to avoid repetition with Milton, Atchison County, Missouri. A post office called Firth was established in 1883, and remained in operation until it was discontinued in 1902.

Milton once had a schoolhouse, now defunct.
