= Kimberly, Missouri =

Unincorporated community in Missouri, U.S.

Coordinates: 39°25′54″N 92°29′21″W

Kimberly is an unincorporated community in Randolph County, in the U.S. state of Missouri.

== History ==
Kimberly had is start in 1895 as a mining community. A post office called Kimberly was established in 1900, and remained in operation until 1905. The community takes its name from the mining center of Kimberley, South Africa.
