= High Hill School =

- U.S. National Register of Historic Places
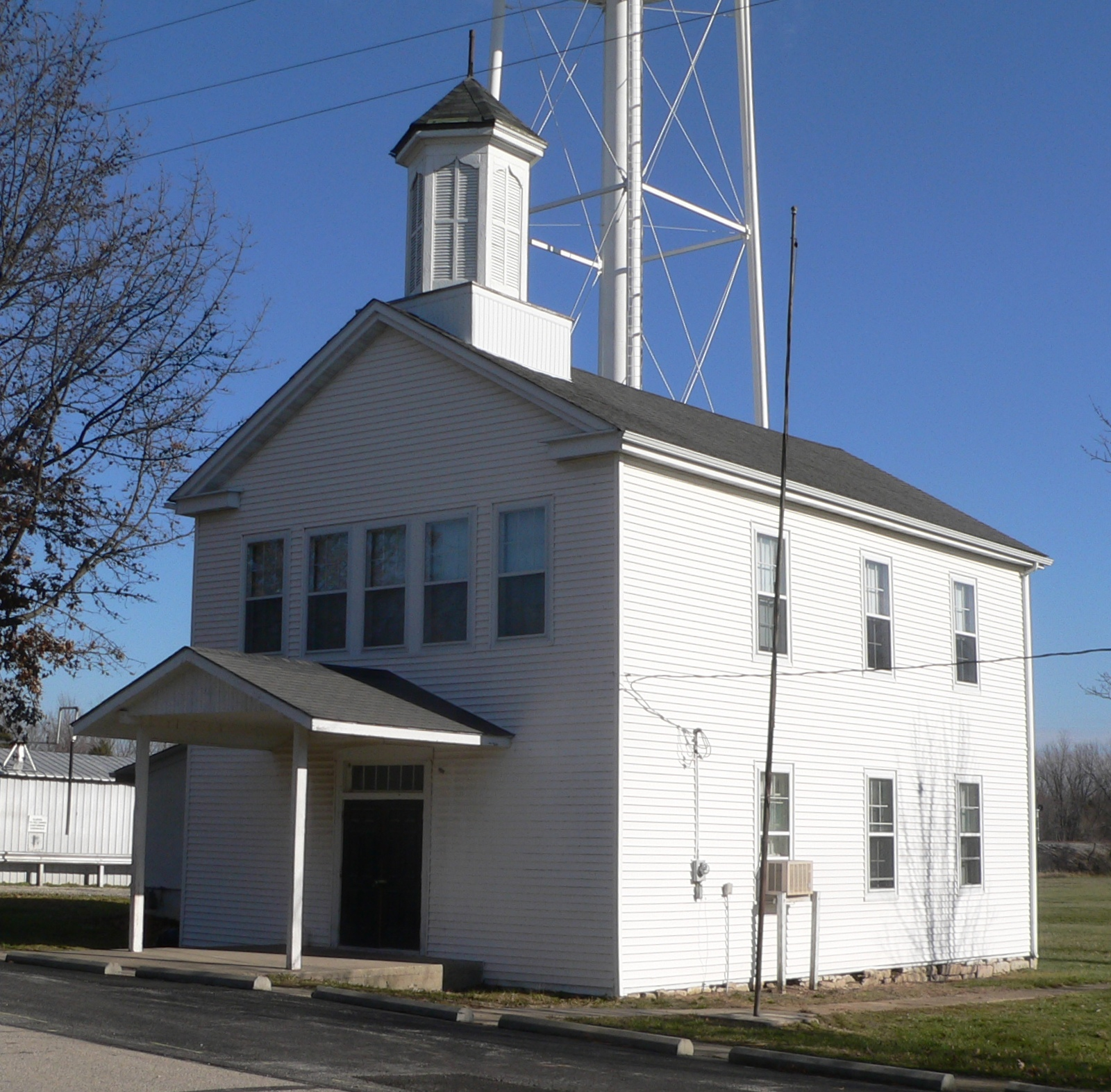
- High Hill School, December 2012

- Location within Missouri Location within the United States
- Location: Off U.S. 40, High Hill, Missouri
- Coordinates: 38°52′42″N 91°22′52″W
- Area: 1.1 acres (0.45 ha)
- Built: 1867
- Architectural style: Greek Revival
- NRHP reference No.: 80002381
- Added to NRHP: November 14, 1980

High Hill School, also known as High Hill Community Building, is a historic school building located at High Hill, Montgomery County, Missouri. It was built in 1867, and is two-story, Greek Revival style frame building with a gable roof. It is topped by a six-sided belfry with ogee-arched louvered openings and hexagonal roof. It housed a school until 1954, after which it became a community center.

It was listed on the National Register of Historic Places in 1980.
