= Moniteau Creek (north central Missouri) =

Stream in Missouri, U.S.

Moniteau Creek is a stream in Randolph, Howard and Boone counties in the U.S. state of Missouri. The headwaters of the stream are southwest of Moberly in Randolph County. The stream flows south passing into Howard County in the Rudolph Bennett Conservation Area. The stream flows south-southwest along the eastern part of the county passing under Missouri Route 124 and becomes the boundary between Howard and Boone counties before passing under U. S. Route 40 and entering the Missouri River just south of Rocheport.

The stream source is at 39°21′19″N 92°27′20″W and the confluence is at 38°58′26″N 92°33′59″W.

Moniteau Creek derives its name from the Indian term Manitou.

== See also ==
- List of rivers of Missouri
- Tributaries of the Missouri River
