= Hubbard, Missouri =

Unincorporated community in Missouri, U.S.

Coordinates: 39°34′57″N 92°41′35″W

Hubbard is an unincorporated community in northwest Randolph County, Missouri.

The community is on a county road about one-quarter mile east of the Randolph-Chariton county line and two miles south of the Macon county line. The Thomas Hill Reservoir is two miles east.

== History ==
A post office called Hubbard was established in 1886 and remained in operation until 1902. The community was named after a local merchant with the surname "Hubbard".
