= Fort Henry =

Fort Henry is the name of:

- Fort Henry (bunker), a Second World War bunker in Studland Bay, Dorset.
- Fort Henry, Missouri, an unincorporated community
- Fort Henry (Jersey), an 18th-century fort that is part of the coastal fortifications of Jersey
- Fort Henry (North Dakota), an 1822 fort southwest of present-day Williston, North Dakota
- Fort Henry (Pennsylvania), stockade built during the French and Indian War, in Berks County, Pennsylvania
- Fort Henry (Tennessee), site of the Battle of Fort Henry (1862) in Tennessee during the American Civil War
- Fort Henry (Virginia), a 1646 fort near present-day Petersburg, Virginia
- Fort Henry (West Virginia), a 1774 fort near present–day Wheeling, West Virginia
- Fort Henry, a winter camp built by Andrew Henry (fur trader) on Henry's Fork of the Snake River in 1810-11
- Fort Henry National Historic Site (1837) in Kingston, Ontario, a limestone redoubt and connected fortified battery
- USS Fort Henry, a gunboat which served in the Union Navy during the American Civil War

== See also ==
- Battle of Fort Henry, in 1862 during the American Civil War, in Middle Tennessee
- Siege of Fort Henry (disambiguation)
- Fort McHenry, Maryland
