= Farmers Mercantile Co. Building =

- U.S. National Register of Historic Places
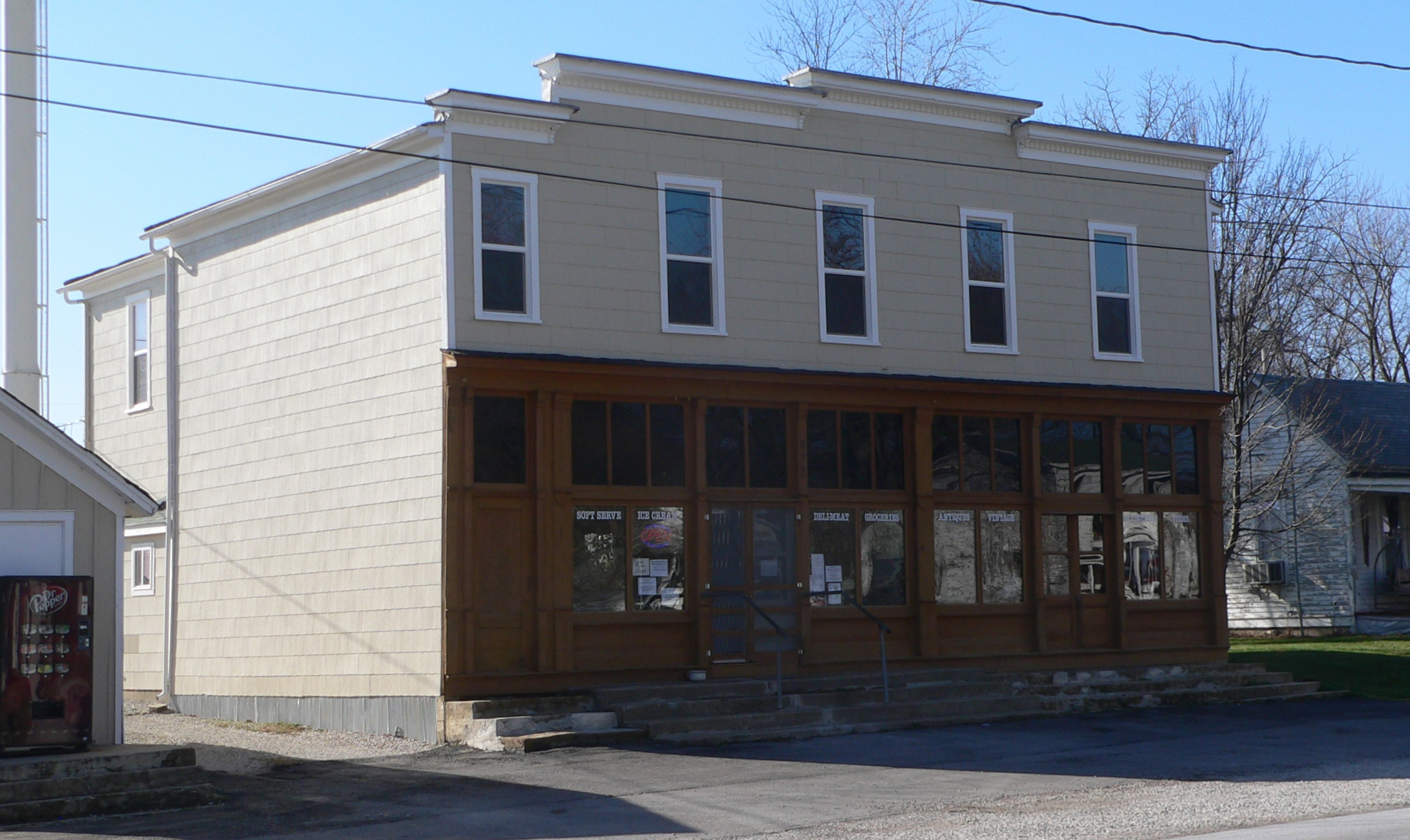
- Farmers Mercantile Co. Building, December 2012

- Location within Missouri Location within the United States
- Location: 872 Boone's Lick Rd., High Hill, Missouri
- Coordinates: 38°52′41″N 91°23′4″W
- Area: less than one acre
- Architectural style: Two part commercial block
- NRHP reference No.: 04000604
- Added to NRHP: June 16, 2004

Farmers Mercantile Co. Building is a historic commercial building located at High Hill, Montgomery County, Missouri. It was built in 1904, and is two-story, frame building. It rests on a stone foundation and has a low-pitched gable roof behind a stepped parapet. The building historically served as a social and commercial center for the community.

It was listed on the National Register of Historic Places in 2004.
