= Higbee High School =

Coordinates: 39°18′22″N 92°30′44″W

Location
- 101 Evans Street; Higbee, (Randolph County), Missouri 65257; United States

Information
- Type: Public high school
- School district: Higbee R-VIII Public School District
- Principal: Tanner Burton
- Staff: 7.68 (FTE)
- Enrollment: 64 (2022-23)
- Student to teacher ratio: 8.33
- Colors: Black and gold
- Nickname: Tigers
- Website: www.higbeeschool.com

Higbee High School is a public high school located in Higbee, Missouri, United States. The high school and junior high school have 107 students in grades seven through twelve. The school mascot is the tiger, with black and gold being the school colors. The small high school size prevents it from fielding a football team. The school offers boys baseball and girls softball in both fall and spring. Basketball is offered in the winter months. Boys and girls track and field are offered in the spring.
