= Fort Henry, Missouri =

Unincorporated community in Missouri, U.S.

Coordinates: 39°27′49″N 92°36′28″W

Fort Henry is an unincorporated community in Randolph County, in the U.S. state of Missouri. The community is on Missouri Route O approximately 3.5 miles west-northwest of Huntsville.

== History ==
A post office called Fort Henry was established in 1857, and remained in operation until 1875. The name "Fort Henry" is a backwards rendering of the name of Henry Fort, a pioneer citizen. The community once had a schoolhouse, now defunct.
