= Moberly, Missouri =

City in Randolph County, Missouri, United States

- City
- City of Moberly
- Location within Randolph County and Missouri
- Coordinates: 39°25′04″N 92°26′11″W
- Country: United States
- State: Missouri
- County: Randolph
- Founded: 1866
- Incorporated: 1868

Government
  - Type: Council-manager government
  - Mayor: Brandon Lucas
  - City Manager: Michael Bugalski

Area
  - Total: 13.22 sq mi (34.24 km^{2})
  - Land: 13.18 sq mi (34.13 km^{2})
  - Water: 0.042 sq mi (0.11 km^{2})
- Elevation: 873 ft (266 m)

Population (2020)
  - Total: 13,783
  - Density: 1,046.0/sq mi (403.85/km^{2})
- Time zone: UTC-6 (Central (CST))
  - Summer (DST): UTC-5 (CDT)
- ZIP code: 65270
- Area code: 660
- FIPS code: 29-49034
- GNIS feature ID: 2395362
- Website: moberlymo.org

Moberly is a city in Randolph County, Missouri, United States. The population was 13,783 as of the 2020 census. It is part of the Columbia metropolitan area and the 9-county Columbia–Jefferson City–Moberly combined statistical area that has 415,747 residents.

== History ==
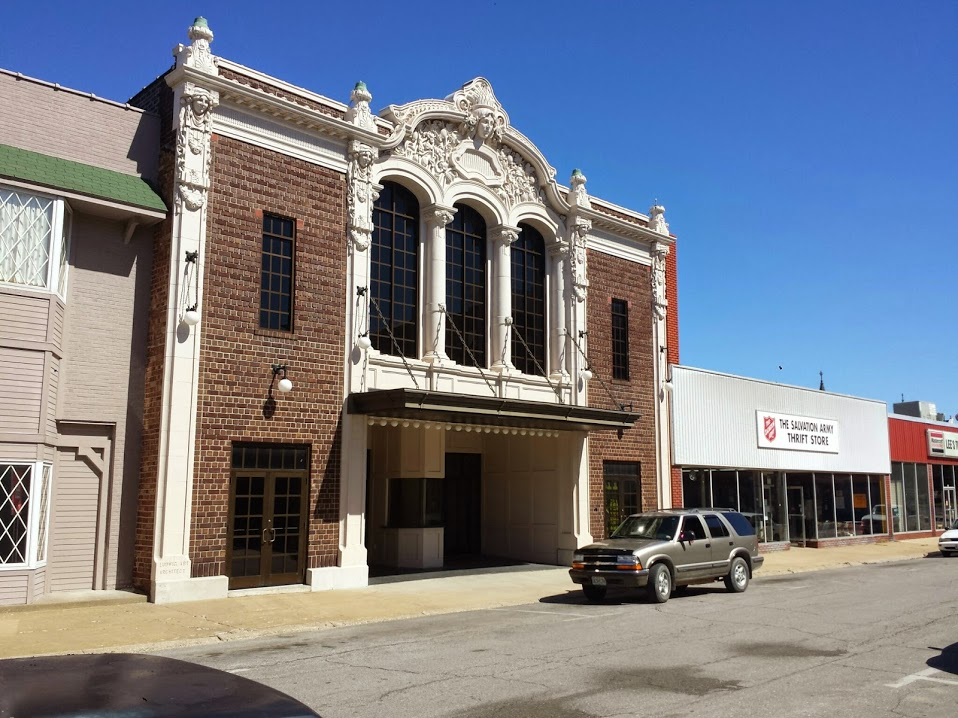
The facade of the historic 4th Street theater in downtown Moberly. Built in 1913; is the oldest vaudeville theatre in Mid-Missouri.

Moberly was founded in 1866, and named after Colonel William E. Moberly, the first president of the Chariton and Randolph County railroads.

Moberly, which gained the nickname the "Magic City" because of its explosive growth in a railroad boom, grew from the town platted by the North Missouri Railroad (later part of the Wabash Railroad) in 1866 to a transportation center with a 6,070 population by 1880. The North Mo. acquired the site when it took over the Chariton and Randolph R.R. after the Civil War. In 1860, the C.& R. had planned a road west to Brunswick from this point on the North Mo. then reaching toward Iowa.

The Chariton and Randolph R. R. named its proposed junction for William Moberly, head of the railroad, and offered free land to residents of once nearby Allen to settle here. Patrick Lynch, who alone accepted, was given two lots by the North Missouri after the Civil War for holding the site without "the loss of a life or a house."

Moberly has been a division point since 1867 when the North Mo. (Wabash) reached Brunswick. Huge railroad repair shops, one of the earliest railroad plants west of the Mississippi, were opened, 1872. The M. K. & T. formed a junction here, 1873. Transportation facilities brought industrial growth and the development of the soil, fire clay, and coal resources of the area.

Moberly lies in a glacial plains area in a county organized, 1829, and names for John Randolph of Roanoke, Va. In Missouri's Little Dixie Region, it was first settled by William Holman, 1818. William Fort boiled salt at a spring near Huntsville in 1820s/ The Bee Trace, a pioneer trail, ran along the Grand Divide (the high point in The Grand Prairie) between the Missouri and Mississippi through the county. The Iowa, Sac, and Fox tribes gave up claims to the region, 1824.

At Huntsville, county seat, since 1831, a plank road was built to Glasgow, 1854, and the 1855-82 Mt. Pleasant (Baptist) College was founded. County legal business has been conducted at Huntsville and Moberly since 1885. Moberly Junior College opened, 1927.

World War II Gen. Omar N. Bradley, first Chairman Joint Chiefs of Staff and commander of the largest Army in United States history was born in nearby Clark, but grew up in Moberly and graduated from Moberly High School. Moberly's airport is named for him. Moberly is the home of novelist Elizabeth Seifert Gasparotti and birthplace of writer Jack Conroy. G.W. P. Hunt, first Governor of Arizona, was born in Huntsville. Hancock L. Jackson, interim Gov. of Mo., 1857; Lt. Gov., 1857–61, and the biochemist Victor C. Vaughn, were natives of Randolph County.

The Missouri state Moberly Correctional Center was constructed two miles south of Moberly in 1963 as a minimum-security prison. As of 2014, it houses about 1800 minimum and medium security inmates.

On Independence Day, 1995, a tornado ripped through downtown Moberly. There were no reported deaths, but there was a large amount of structural damage. Another tornado hit nearby Renick on March 12, 2006. Four people were killed and thirteen were injured in the F3-level tornado. Dozens of homes were destroyed.

The World War II-era US Navy frigate USS Moberly (PF-63) was named for the town. The ship participated mostly in convoy escort, earning a battle star for her assistance in sinking a German submarine, U-853.

The Burkholder-O'Keefe House, Moberly Commercial Historic District, and Moberly Junior High School are listed on the National Register of Historic Places.

== Geography ==
Moberly is in southeast Randolph County at the intersection of U.S. Route 63 and U.S. Route 24. Nearby streams include Sugar Creek to the northwest, Coy Branch and Coon Creek to the east and Sweet Spring Creek to the southwest.

According to the United States Census Bureau, the city has an area of 12.26 square miles (31.75 km^{2}), of which 12.22 square miles (31.65 km^{2}) is land and 0.04 square miles (0.10 km^{2}) is water.

=== Climate ===
Climate data for Moberly, Missouri (1991–2020 normals, extremes 1936–present)
Month	Jan	Feb	Mar	Apr	May	Jun	Jul	Aug	Sep	Oct	Nov	Dec	Year
Record high °F (°C)	76 (24)	82 (28)	87 (31)	92 (33)	96 (36)	102 (39)	112 (44)	108 (42)	102 (39)	96 (36)	83 (28)	73 (23)	112 (44)
Mean daily maximum °F (°C)	37.1 (2.8)	42.2 (5.7)	53.9 (12.2)	64.7 (18.2)	74.2 (23.4)	82.8 (28.2)	87.0 (30.6)	85.6 (29.8)	78.2 (25.7)	66.8 (19.3)	53.2 (11.8)	42.0 (5.6)	64.0 (17.8)
Daily mean °F (°C)	28.0 (−2.2)	32.5 (0.3)	43.8 (6.6)	54.4 (12.4)	64.5 (18.1)	73.2 (22.9)	77.3 (25.2)	75.7 (24.3)	67.8 (19.9)	56.3 (13.5)	43.5 (6.4)	33.3 (0.7)	54.2 (12.3)
Mean daily minimum °F (°C)	18.9 (−7.3)	22.7 (−5.2)	33.6 (0.9)	44.1 (6.7)	54.9 (12.7)	63.7 (17.6)	67.5 (19.7)	65.7 (18.7)	57.3 (14.1)	45.9 (7.7)	33.8 (1.0)	24.7 (−4.1)	44.4 (6.9)
Record low °F (°C)	−21 (−29)	−19 (−28)	−12 (−24)	17 (−8)	28 (−2)	40 (4)	48 (9)	44 (7)	32 (0)	18 (−8)	−4 (−20)	−20 (−29)	−21 (−29)
Average precipitation inches (mm)	1.87 (47)	2.06 (52)	3.26 (83)	4.58 (116)	5.13 (130)	5.16 (131)	4.53 (115)	3.94 (100)	3.95 (100)	3.38 (86)	2.65 (67)	2.19 (56)	42.70 (1,085)
Average snowfall inches (cm)	5.6 (14)	3.2 (8.1)	1.2 (3.0)	0.2 (0.51)	0.0 (0.0)	0.0 (0.0)	0.0 (0.0)	0.0 (0.0)	0.0 (0.0)	0.1 (0.25)	0.7 (1.8)	4.0 (10)	15.1 (38)
Average precipitation days (≥ 0.01 in)	6.4	6.8	9.2	10.9	12.1	9.6	7.9	7.8	7.4	8.7	7.3	7.0	101.1
Average snowy days (≥ 0.1 in)	2.3	1.9	0.6	0.1	0.0	0.0	0.0	0.0	0.0	0.1	0.3	2.0	7.3
Source: NOAA

== Demographics ==
Historical population
Census	Pop.	Note	%±
1870	1,514		—
1880	6,070		300.9%
1890	8,215		35.3%
1900	8,012		−2.5%
1910	10,923		36.3%
1920	12,808		17.3%
1930	13,772		7.5%
1940	12,920		−6.2%
1950	13,115		1.5%
1960	13,170		0.4%
1970	12,988		−1.4%
1980	13,418		3.3%
1990	12,839		−4.3%
2000	11,945		−7.0%
2010	13,974		17.0%
2020	13,783		−1.4%

The Moberly Micropolitan Statistical Area consists of Randolph County.

=== 2020 census ===
As of the 2020 census, Moberly had a population of 13,783. There were 5,051 households, 2,968 families, and 5,783 housing units. Of the housing units, 12.7% were vacant, with a homeowner vacancy rate of 4.3% and a rental vacancy rate of 8.3%.

The median age was 38.2 years. About 20.9% of residents were under age 18, and 15.9% were age 65 or older. For every 100 females, there were 118.5 males, and for every 100 females age 18 and over, there were 122.7 males. About 87.9% of residents lived in urban areas, while 12.1% lived in rural areas.

Of the 5,051 households, 29.5% had children under the age of 18 living in them. Of all households, 37.4% were married-couple households, 20.5% had a male householder with no spouse or partner present, and 33.4% had a female householder with no spouse or partner present. About 35.6% of all households were made up of individuals, and 14.9% had someone living alone who was 65 years of age or older. The average household size was 2.5 and the average family size was 3.1.

Racial composition as of the 2020 census
Race	Number	Percent
White	11,356	82.4%
Black or African American	1,258	9.1%
American Indian and Alaska Native	71	0.5%
Asian	67	0.5%
Native Hawaiian and Other Pacific Islander	6	0.0%
Some other race	105	0.8%
Two or more races	920	6.7%
Hispanic or Latino (of any race)	378	2.7%

=== Income and poverty ===
The 2016–2020 5-year American Community Survey estimates show that the median household income was $39,327 (with a margin of error of +/- $3,442) and the median family income was $50,714 (+/- $7,271). Males had a median income of $31,651 (+/- $3,623) versus $25,865 (+/- $4,420) for females. The median income for those above 16 years old was $28,497 (+/- $4,084). Approximately, 18.3% of families and 21.2% of the population were below the poverty line, including 33.7% of those under the age of 18 and 8.1% of those ages 65 or over.

=== 2010 census ===
As of the census of 2010, there were 13,974 people, 4,960 households, and 3,019 families residing in the city. The population density was 1,143.5 inhabitants per square mile (441.5/km^{2}). There were 5,687 housing units at an average density of 465.4 per square mile (179.7/km^{2}). The racial makeup of the city was 86.4% White, 9.7% African American, 0.4% Native American, 0.6% Asian, 0.3% from other races, and 2.6% from two or more races. Hispanic or Latino of any race were 2.1% of the population.

There were 4,960 households, of which 32.5% had children under the age of 18 living with them, 40.1% were married couples living together, 15.9% had a female householder with no husband present, 4.8% had a male householder with no wife present, and 39.1% were non-families. 33.4% of all households were made up of individuals, and 14.1% had someone living alone who was 65 years of age or older. The average household size was 2.35 and the average family size was 2.97.

The median age in the city was 35.7 years. 22% of residents were under the age of 18; 10.9% were between the ages of 18 and 24; 29.7% were from 25 to 44; 23.5% were from 45 to 64; and 13.9% were 65 years of age or older. The gender makeup of the city was 53.8% male and 46.2% female.

=== 2000 census ===
As of the census of 2000, there were 11,945 people, 5,001 households, and 3,090 families residing in the city. The population density was 1,033.8 inhabitants per square mile (399.2/km^{2}). There were 5,812 housing units at an average density of 503.0 per square mile (194.2/km^{2}). The racial makeup of the city was 90.51% White, 6.71% African American, 0.37% Native American, 0.64% Asian, 0.03% Pacific Islander, 0.39% from other races, and 1.34% from two or more races. Hispanic or Latino of any race were 1.67% of the population.

There were 5,001 households, out of which 29.3% had children under the age of 18 living with them, 44.2% were married couples living together, 13.6% had a female householder with no husband present, and 38.2% were non-families. 33.2% of all households were made up of individuals, and 16.1% had someone living alone who was 65 years of age or older. The average household size was 2.30 and the average family size was 2.89.

In the city, the population was spread out, with 24.8% under the age of 18, 11.1% from 18 to 24, 25.4% from 25 to 44, 20.1% from 45 to 64, and 18.7% who were 65 years of age or older. The median age was 36 years. For every 100 females, there were 86.6 males. For every 100 females age 18 and over, there were 80.8 males.

The median income for a household in the city was $28,519, and the median income for a family was $37,488. Males had a median income of $27,152 versus $19,508 for females. The per capita income for the city was $15,478. About 11.1% of families and 15.0% of the population were below the poverty line, including 20.5% of those under age 18 and 14.7% of those age 65 or over.

== Government ==
The city of Moberly was born of a railroad auction on September 27, 1866. The county incorporated the town in 1868 with a board of trustees. The same year that the Wabash Railroad, St. Louis & Pacific Railway shops were finished in Moberly, the city entered a charter into state record and incorporated. At the time, there was no such thing as a council-manager government, but the 1950s saw the government form come into vogue in Missouri. Now, the city of Moberly has a council-manager government. The council consists of five members elected for three-year terms and one city counselor who drafts ordinances and acts as legal counsel. Each year, the council elects one of its members as mayor and one as mayor pro tempore to serve for one year. To manage the city and oversee day-to-day operations, the council selects a city manager. In 2026, the government had these officers:

=== City Council ===
- Brandon L. Lucas, Mayor
- Chuck McKeown, Mayor Pro Tem
- Sarah Barfield Graff, Councilman
- Brian Katcher, Councilman
- Mike Skubic, Councilman
- Randall Thompson, City Counselor
- Michael R. Bugalski, City Manager
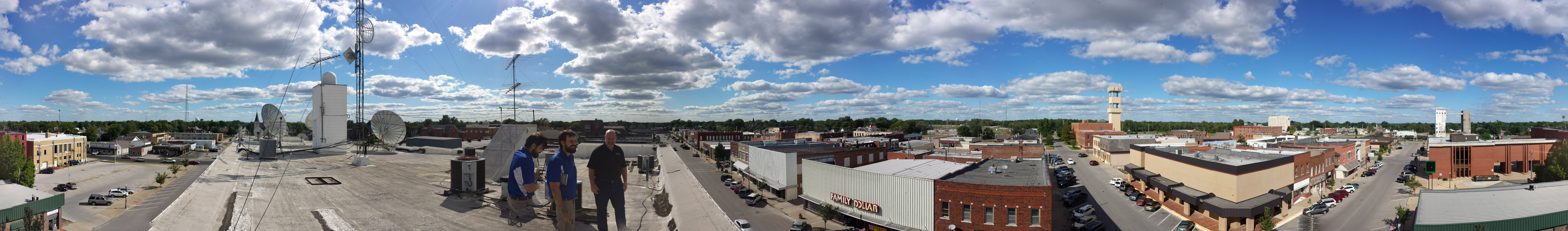
A panorama from the northeast corner of the Kwix-Kres-Kirk office building in downtown Moberly, Missouri.

== Recreation ==
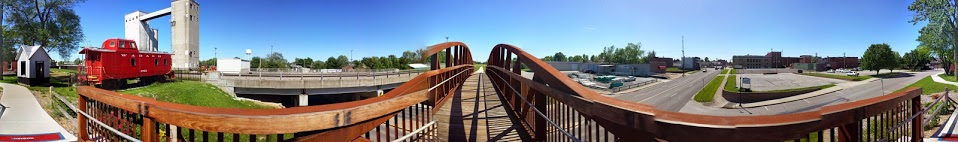
The Railroad museum run by the Randolph county historical society, connected to a walking path that runs south, and overlooking the Municipal Auditorium and West Rollins Street.
- Moberly Parks and Recreation operates approximately 500 acres of parkland through five parks including maintained grounds, forest, lakes, the Howard Hils Athletic Complex consisting of eight baseball/softball fields and three football/soccer fields, the Moberly Aquatic Center, Thompson Campground, The Lodge, Municipal Auditorium, the Magic City Line - a one mile long miniature train track, over two miles of paved trails, boat ramps, fishing lakes, paddleboat/canoe rentals, and shelters.
- Moberly Midget League has provided a summer baseball program for the local youth since 1950. The program currently ranges from 8U to 14U.
- The Moberly Optimist Club has provided a summer youth baseball for decades. The program currently ranges from T-ball to 8U.
- The Randolph County Historical Society has its headquarters in Moberly, and has two museums: one dedicated to county history and genealogy, and another dedicated to the Wabash, MKT, and CB&Q railroads.

== Education ==
Moberly is home to two colleges; Central Bible University and Moberly Area Community College. The Moberly School District consists of seven schools. The Early Childhood Center serves preschoolers; North and South Park Elementary serve grades K-2; grades 3-5 attend Gratz Brown Elementary; grades 6-8 attend Moberly Middle School; and Moberly High School and Moberly Area Technical Center serve grades 9–12. East Park School served as an alternative school until the new ACES (alternative center for educational success) was opened in the second part of the 2023-2024 school year. The Seventh-day Adventist church operates Maranatha Adventist School, a K-8 school. The St. Pius X Catholic Elementary School, operated by the Catholic Church of the same name, serves grade K-8.

Moberly has a public library, a branch of the Little Dixie Regional Libraries.

== Transportation ==
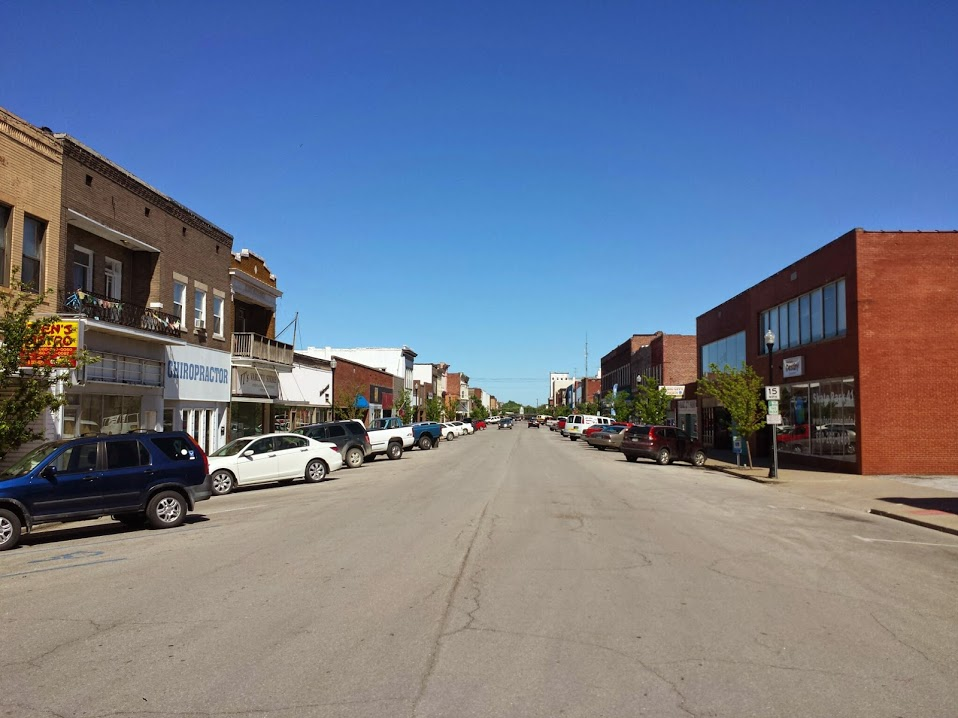
West Reed Street, facing East from the United States post office building.

Moberly is served by The Omar Bradley Airport. Commercial service is available 33 miles to the south in Columbia at the Columbia Regional Airport or the MO-X (an airport shuttle to and from STL and MCI), 60 miles to the south in Jefferson City via the Amtrak station, 45 miles to the north in La Plata via the Amtrak station, or 55 miles to the North in Kirksville at the Kirksville Regional Airport.

The city is served by U.S. Route 63 to the east on a bypass. The old route is designated as both Business 63 and Morley Street and goes through town. U.S. Route 24 goes through town as well. Route M (formerly Route 3) also skirts the edge of town. Other routes include Route DD (indirectly goes to Sugar Creek Lake), EE, A, and AA (past the prison). At one time there was a Business 24 that ran from Morley Street via West Coates Street to Johnson Street to Concannon Street turning North on Holman St to current U.S. 24. This route was de-numbered in the late 1960s. State Route 22 was also multiplexed with U.S. 63 to U.S. 24. When U.S. 63 was re-routed in the mid-1960s Highway 22 was truncated to its current end at U.S. 63 near Sturgeon, MO.

The Norfolk Southern Railway serves Moberly running west toward Kansas City, Missouri and east toward Hannibal, Missouri and points on. Norfolk Southern also runs south between Moberly and St. Louis, Missouri (via Centralia and Mexico, MO) and points on. Moberly was once the northern terminus of the Missouri-Kansas-Texas Railroad that ran between Moberly and Boonville, Missouri. Much of this route is still somewhat visible in satellite images.

Moberly is home to one of Norfolk Southern's many rail yards. Norfolk Southern used to have a line that ran north from Moberly to Albia, Iowa, but it was abandoned in the spring of 1992. The line was reopened from 1993–1995 to help in recovery efforts after the great Flood of 1993. By 1997, the line was dismantled between Moberly and Moulton, Iowa.

The Centerville, Iowa-owned Appanoose County Community Railroad currently operates the section from Moulton to Albia, Iowa.

== Media ==
Moberly is served by a weekly newspaper, the Moberly Monitor-Index. The KWIX KRES KIRK KTCM radio stations operate from downtown.

== Notable people ==
- George W. Althouse, Nebraska state legislator
- Russ Ball, NFL executive
- Omar Bradley, United States Army general
- Brent Briscoe, actor
- David Clohessy, executive director of SNAP, the Survivors Network of those Abused by Priests
- Jack Conroy, author and activist
- Jerry Doggett, sports broadcaster
- Maud Durbin, actress
- Jered Eames, musician
- Brad Hunt, actor
- Howard Wight Marshall, professor, folk historian, and fiddler
- Leroy Matlock, baseball pitcher in the Negro leagues
- Dennis L. McKiernan, author
- Hartman Rector Jr., former LDS General Authority
- Luann Ridgeway, politician
- Elizabeth Seifert, author
- Melvin B. Tolson, poet and professor at Wiley College, poet laureate of Liberia

== See also ==
- List of cities in Missouri
