= Randolph County, Missouri =

County in Missouri, United States

- County
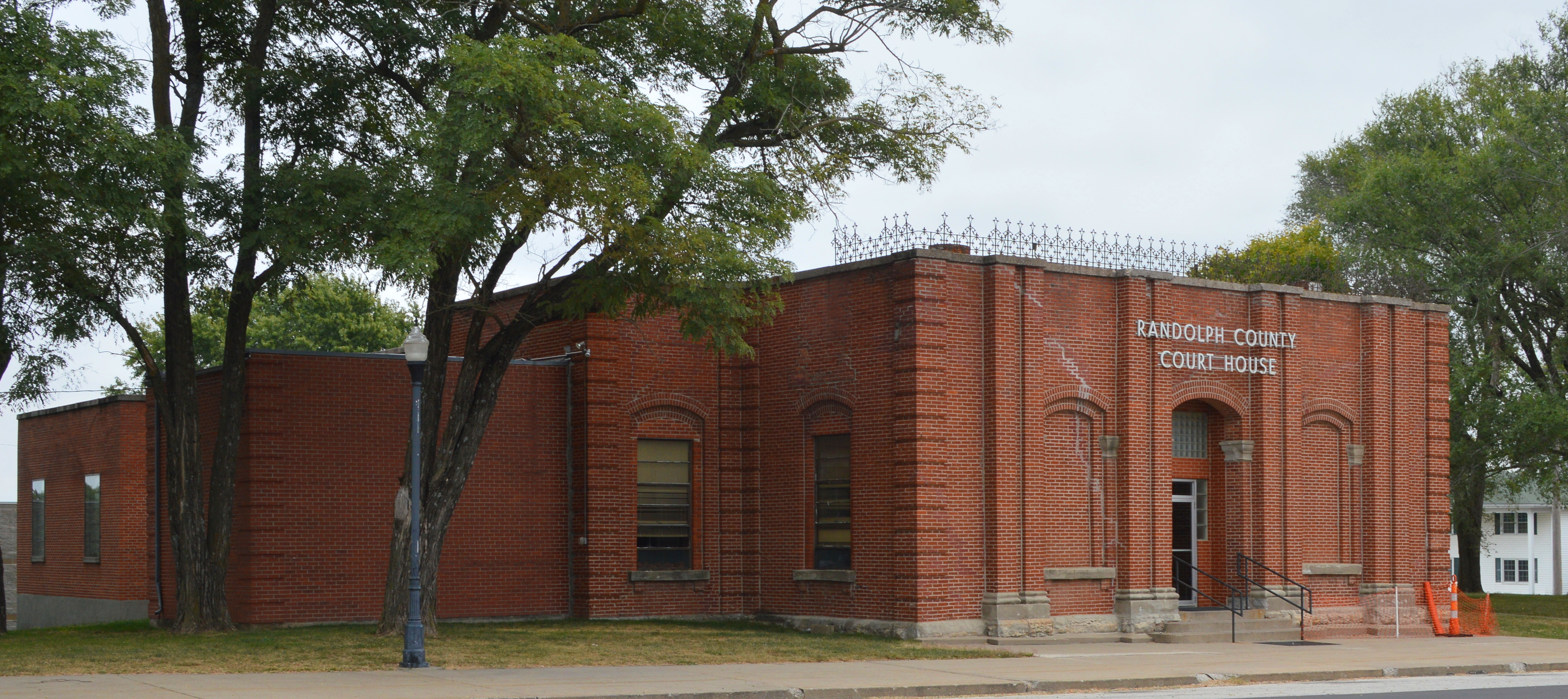
- The Historic Randolph County Courthouse in Huntsville

- Location within the U.S. state of Missouri
- Coordinates: 39°26′N 92°30′W
- Country: United States
- State: Missouri
- Founded: January 22, 1829
- Named for: John Randolph of Roanoke
- Seat: Huntsville
- Largest city: Moberly

Area
  - Total: 488 sq mi (1,260 km^{2})
  - Land: 483 sq mi (1,250 km^{2})
  - Water: 5.1 sq mi (13 km^{2}) 1.1%

Population (2020)
  - Total: 24,716
  - Estimate (2025): 24,513 ▼
  - Density: 51.2/sq mi (19.8/km^{2})
- Time zone: UTC−6 (Central)
  - Summer (DST): UTC−5 (CDT)
- Congressional district: 4th
- Website: randolphcounty-mo.com

Randolph County is a county in the northern portion of the U.S. state of Missouri. As of the 2020 census, the population was 24,716. Its county seat is Huntsville. The county was organized January 22, 1829, and named for U.S. Representative and U.S. Senator John Randolph of Roanoke, Virginia.

Randolph County comprises the Moberly, Missouri Micropolitan Statistical Area, which is also included in the Columbia-Moberly-Mexico, Missouri Combined Statistical Area.

== History ==
Randolph County was primarily settled by migrants from the Upper Southern states, especially Kentucky and Tennessee. They brought slaves and slaveholding traditions with them, and quickly started cultivating crops similar to those in Middle Tennessee and Kentucky: hemp and tobacco. Randolph was one of several counties settled mostly by Southerners to the north and south of the Missouri River. Given their culture and traditions, this area became known as Little Dixie, and Randolph County was at its heart.

Randolph County was home to Omar Bradley, the last of nine 5-star generals of the American military.

== Geography ==
According to the U.S. Census Bureau, the county has a total area of 488 square miles (1,260 km^{2}), of which 483 square miles (1,250 km^{2}) is land and 5.1 square miles (13 km^{2}) (1.1%) is water.

=== Adjacent counties ===
- Macon County (north)
- Monroe County (east)
- Shelby County (northeast)
- Audrain County (southeast)
- Boone County (southeast)
- Howard County (south)
- Chariton County (west)

=== Major highways ===
- U.S. Route 24
- U.S. Route 63
- Route 3

== Demographics ==
Historical population
Census	Pop.	Note	%±
1830	2,942		—
1840	7,198		144.7%
1850	9,439		31.1%
1860	11,407		20.8%
1870	15,908		39.5%
1880	22,751		43.0%
1890	24,893		9.4%
1900	24,442		−1.8%
1910	26,182		7.1%
1920	27,633		5.5%
1930	26,431		−4.3%
1940	24,458		−7.5%
1950	22,918		−6.3%
1960	22,014		−3.9%
1970	22,434		1.9%
1980	25,460		13.5%
1990	24,370		−4.3%
2000	24,663		1.2%
2010	25,414		3.0%
2020	24,716		−2.7%
2025 (est.)	24,513	▼	−0.8%
U.S. Decennial Census; 1790–1960 1900–1990; 1990–2000 2010

=== 2020 census ===
As of the 2020 census, the county had a population of 24,716 and a median age of 40.5 years; 21.4% of residents were under the age of 18, and 17.7% were 65 years of age or older. For every 100 females there were 110.9 males, and for every 100 females age 18 and over there were 112.3 males.

The racial makeup of the county was 87.1% White, 5.5% Black or African American, 0.4% American Indian and Alaska Native, 0.4% Asian, 0.0% Native Hawaiian and Pacific Islander, 0.6% from some other race, and 5.9% from two or more races. Hispanic or Latino residents of any race comprised 2.3% of the population.

49.2% of residents lived in urban areas, while 50.8% lived in rural areas.

There were 9,424 households in the county, of which 29.1% had children under the age of 18 living with them and 26.9% had a female householder with no spouse or partner present. About 30.2% of all households were made up of individuals and 13.2% had someone living alone who was 65 years of age or older.

There were 10,773 housing units, of which 12.5% were vacant. Among occupied housing units, 69.4% were owner-occupied and 30.6% were renter-occupied. The homeowner vacancy rate was 2.8% and the rental vacancy rate was 9.7%.

=== Racial and ethnic composition ===
Randolph County, Missouri – Racial and ethnic composition Note: the US Census treats Hispanic/Latino as an ethnic category. This table excludes Latinos from the racial categories and assigns them to a separate category. Hispanics/Latinos may be of any race.
Race / Ethnicity (NH = Non-Hispanic)	Pop 1980	Pop 1990	Pop 2000	Pop 2010	Pop 2020	% 1980	% 1990	% 2000	% 2010	% 2020
White alone (NH)	23,523	22,199	22,164	22,865	21,271	92.39%	91.09%	89.87%	89.97%	86.06%
Black or African American alone (NH)	1,595	1,826	1,717	1,477	1,351	6.26%	7.49%	6.96%	5.81%	5.47%
Native American or Alaska Native alone (NH)	42	80	106	66	102	0.16%	0.33%	0.43%	0.26%	0.41%
Asian alone (NH)	52	79	90	105	95	0.20%	0.32%	0.36%	0.41%	0.38%
Native Hawaiian or Pacific Islander alone (NH)	x	x	5	3	9	x	x	0.02%	0.01%	0.04%
Other race alone (NH)	60	7	19	10	75	0.24%	0.03%	0.08%	0.04%	0.30%
Mixed race or Multiracial (NH)	x	x	280	475	1,241	x	x	1.14%	1.87%	5.02%
Hispanic or Latino (any race)	188	179	282	413	572	0.74%	0.73%	1.14%	1.63%	2.31%
Total	25,460	24,370	24,663	25,414	24,716	100.00%	100.00%	100.00%	100.00%	100.00%

=== 2000 census ===
As of the census of 2000, there were 24,663 people, 9,199 households, and 6,236 families residing in the county. The population density was 51 inhabitants per square mile (20/km^{2}). There were 10,740 housing units at an average density of 22 units per square mile (8.5/km^{2}). The racial makeup of the county was 90.58% White, 7.03% Black or African American, 0.48% Native American, 0.39% Asian, 0.02% Pacific Islander, 0.24% from other races, and 1.26% from two or more races. Approximately 1.14% of the population were Hispanic or Latino of any race. 24.1% were of German, 21.4% American, 10.9% English and 9.1% Irish ancestry.

There were 9,199 households, out of which 31.40% had children under the age of 18 living with them, 52.70% were married couples living together, 11.10% had a female householder with no husband present, and 32.20% were non-families. 27.90% of all households were made up of individuals, and 13.10% had someone living alone who was 65 years of age or older. The average household size was 2.43 and the average family size was 2.94.

In the county, the population was spread out, with 23.80% under the age of 18, 9.60% from 18 to 24, 29.30% from 25 to 44, 22.40% from 45 to 64, and 14.80% who were 65 years of age or older. The median age was 37 years. For every 100 females there were 107.50 males. For every 100 females age 18 and over, there were 108.10 males.

The median income for a household in the county was $31,464, and the median income for a family was $39,268. Males had a median income of $26,878 versus $20,366 for females. The per capita income for the county was $15,010. About 9.20% of families and 12.50% of the population were below the poverty line, including 17.10% of those under age 18 and 13.20% of those age 65 or over.

== Education ==
=== Public schools ===
- Higbee R-VIII School District – Higbee
  - Higbee Elementary School (K–6)
  - Higbee High School (7–12)
- Moberly School District – Moberly
  - North Park Elementary School (K–2)
  - South Park Elementary School (PK–2)
  - Gratz Brown Elementary School (3–5)
  - Moberly Middle School (6–8)
  - Moberly High School (9–12)
- Northeast Randolph County R-IV School District – Cairo
  - Northeast Randolph County Elementary School (PK–5)
  - Northeast Randolph County High School (6–12)
- Renick R-V School District – Renick
  - Renick Elementary School (PK–8)
- Westran R-I School District – Huntsville
  - Westran Elementary School (PK–5)
  - Westran Middle School (6–8)
  - Westran High School (9–12)

=== Private schools ===
- St. Pius X Elementary School – Moberly (PK–8) – Roman Catholic
- Maranatha Seventh-day Adventist School – Moberly (K–9) – Seventh-day Adventist

=== Post-secondary ===
- Central Christian College of the Bible – Moberly– A private, four-year Christian Churches and Churches of Christ university.
- Moberly Area Community College – Moberly – A public, two-year community college.

=== Public libraries ===
- Little Dixie Regional Libraries

== Communities ==
=== Cities ===
- Clark
- Clifton Hill
- Higbee
- Huntsville (county seat)
- Moberly

=== Villages ===
- Cairo
- Jacksonville
- Renick

=== Unincorporated communities ===
- Darksville
- Fort Henry
- Harkes
- Hubbard
- Kimberly
- Levick Mill
- Milton
- Mount Airy
- Randolph Springs
- Roanoke
- Ryder
- Thomas Hill
- Yates

== Politics ==
=== Local ===
The Republican Party mostly controls politics at the local level in Randolph County.

Randolph County, Missouri

Elected countywide officials
Assessor	Kevin Stone	Republican
Circuit Clerk	Michelle Chapman	Republican
County Clerk	Terri Maddox	Republican
Collector	Michelle Lee	Republican
Commissioner (presiding)	Sid Conklin	Republican
Commissioner (district 1)	Jason Lowry	Republican
Commissioner (district 2)	Austin Kyser	Republican
Coroner	Charlie Peel	Republican
Prosecuting Attorney	Stephanie Lunsford	Republican
Public Administrator	Sid Conklin	Republican
Recorder	Mark Price	Democratic
Sheriff	Andy Boggs	Republican
Surveyor	Edward Carpenter	Democratic
Treasurer	Kyle Mayo	Republican

=== State ===
Past Gubernatorial Elections Results
Year	Republican	Democratic	Third Parties
2024	74.92% 8,177	22.99% 2,509	2.10% 229
2020	73.28% 7,842	23.66% 2,532	3.06% 328
2016	62.77% 6,505	34.36% 3,561	2.87% 298
2012	51.09% 5,055	45.39% 4,491	3.53% 349
2008	53.49% 5,652	44.48% 4,700	2.02% 214
2004	57.60% 5,841	41.09% 4,167	1.30% 132
2000	44.50% 4,066	53.60% 4,897	1.90% 174
1996	31.73% 2,852	65.59% 5,895	2.67% 240

Most of Randolph County is a part of Missouri's 6th District in the Missouri House of Representatives. The southern portions of the county are in the 44th, 47th, and 48th Districts.

- District 6 — Ed Lewis (R-Moberly).

Missouri House of Representatives — District 6 — Randolph County (2024)
Party	Candidate	Votes	%	±%
Republican	Ed Lewis	13,234	76.9%	
Democratic	John Akins	3,622	21.5%	

- District 44 — John Martin (R).

Missouri House of Representatives — District 44 — Randolph County (2024)
Party	Candidate	Votes	%	±%
Republican	John Martin	12,864	64.7%	
Democratic	David Raithel	7,023	35.3%	

- District 47 — Adrian Plank (D).

Missouri House of Representatives — District 47 — Randolph County (2024)
Party	Candidate	Votes	%	±%
Democratic	Adrian Plank	11,600	54.5%	

- District 48 — Tim Taylor (R-Booneville).

Missouri House of Representatives — District 48 — Randolph County (2024)
Party	Candidate	Votes	%	±%
Republican	Tim Taylor	14,478	77.4%	
Democratic	Joseph Jefferies	4,228	22.6%	

All of Randolph County is a part of Missouri's 18th District in the Missouri Senate, represented by Cindy O'Laughlin (R)

Missouri House of Representatives — District 48 — Randolph County (2022)
Party	Candidate	Votes	%	±%
Republican	Cindy O'Laughlin	42,989	75.8%	
Democratic	Ayanna Shivers	13,739	24.2%	

=== Federal ===
U.S. Senate — Missouri — Randolph County (2016)
Party	Candidate	Votes	%	±%
Republican	Roy Blunt	6,135	59.23%	+11.07
Democratic	Jason Kander	3,656	35.30%	−8.16
Libertarian	Jonathan Dine	309	2.98%	−5.40
Green	Johnathan McFarland	126	1.22%	+1.22
Constitution	Fred Ryman	132	1.27%	+1.27

All of Randolph County is included in Missouri's 4th congressional district and is currently represented by Sam Graves (R-Tarkio, Missouri) in the U.S. House of Representatives.

U.S. House of Representatives — Missouri's 4th Congressional District — Randolph County (2016)
Party	Candidate	Votes	%	±%
Republican	Vicky Hartzler	7,193	70.84%	−0.01
Democratic	Gordon Christensen	2,440	24.03%	+1.00
Libertarian	Mark Bliss	521	5.13%	−0.99

United States presidential election results for Randolph County, Missouri
Year	Republican		Democratic		Third party(ies)	
Year	No.	%	No.	%	No.	%
1888	1,890	34.20%	3,481	62.98%	156	2.82%
1892	1,709	30.48%	3,695	65.90%	203	3.62%
1896	2,162	34.31%	4,097	65.01%	43	0.68%
1900	1,932	31.87%	4,006	66.07%	125	2.06%
1904	2,139	37.59%	3,351	58.88%	201	3.53%
1908	1,953	31.10%	4,245	67.60%	82	1.31%
1912	1,126	18.34%	4,186	68.18%	828	13.49%
1916	2,111	29.02%	5,081	69.84%	83	1.14%
1920	3,768	31.48%	8,115	67.81%	85	0.71%
1924	2,991	25.85%	7,372	63.72%	1,206	10.42%
1928	4,825	44.50%	6,008	55.41%	9	0.08%
1932	2,575	21.58%	9,294	77.87%	66	0.55%
1936	2,723	21.80%	9,733	77.92%	35	0.28%
1940	3,319	26.56%	9,155	73.26%	23	0.18%
1944	2,879	27.35%	7,629	72.48%	17	0.16%
1948	2,256	22.17%	7,912	77.74%	10	0.10%
1952	3,968	34.52%	7,501	65.25%	27	0.23%
1956	3,709	35.30%	6,797	64.70%	0	0.00%
1960	4,180	39.38%	6,434	60.62%	0	0.00%
1964	2,485	26.23%	6,988	73.77%	0	0.00%
1968	3,582	38.58%	4,810	51.80%	893	9.62%
1972	5,195	57.66%	3,814	42.34%	0	0.00%
1976	3,594	37.91%	5,839	61.59%	48	0.51%
1980	5,141	50.03%	4,884	47.53%	251	2.44%
1984	5,735	56.19%	4,471	43.81%	0	0.00%
1988	4,384	45.22%	5,291	54.57%	20	0.21%
1992	3,025	29.63%	4,951	48.49%	2,234	21.88%
1996	3,274	36.44%	4,502	50.11%	1,209	13.46%
2000	4,844	52.73%	4,116	44.81%	226	2.46%
2004	6,551	64.24%	3,586	35.16%	61	0.60%
2008	6,457	60.59%	3,984	37.39%	215	2.02%
2012	6,667	66.84%	3,031	30.39%	277	2.78%
2016	7,529	72.34%	2,283	21.94%	596	5.73%
2020	8,018	74.63%	2,485	23.13%	241	2.24%
2024	8,322	75.46%	2,571	23.31%	135	1.22%

== See also ==
- National Register of Historic Places listings in Randolph County, Missouri
