= Henry T. Yang =

Chinese-American mechanical engineer (born 1940)

- 楊祖佑
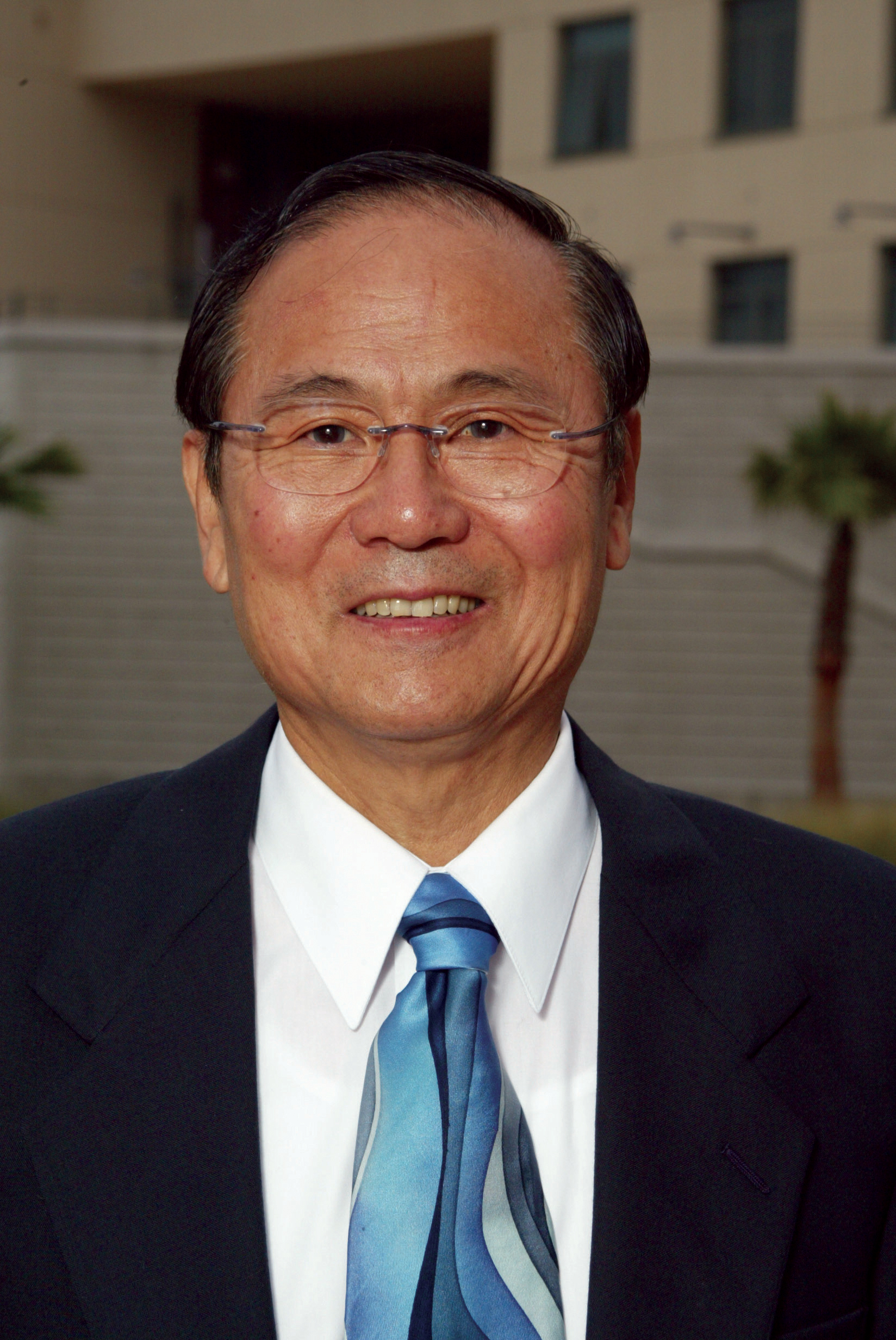
- Yang in October 2005

5th Chancellor of the University of California, Santa Barbara
- In office June 23, 1994 – July 14, 2025
- Preceded by: Barbara Uehling
- Succeeded by: David Marshall (interim); Dennis Assanis

Dean of the Purdue University College of Engineering
- In office 1984–1994

Head of Purdue University School of Aeronautics and Astronautics
- In office 1980–1984

Personal details
- Born: Yang Tzu-Yow; November 29, 1940 (age 85) Chongqing, China
- Citizenship: United States
- Spouse: Dilling Yang
- Children: Maria Chiu-Yee Yang; Martha Chiu-Jung Yang
- Education: National Taiwan University (BS); West Virginia University (MS); Cornell University (PhD)
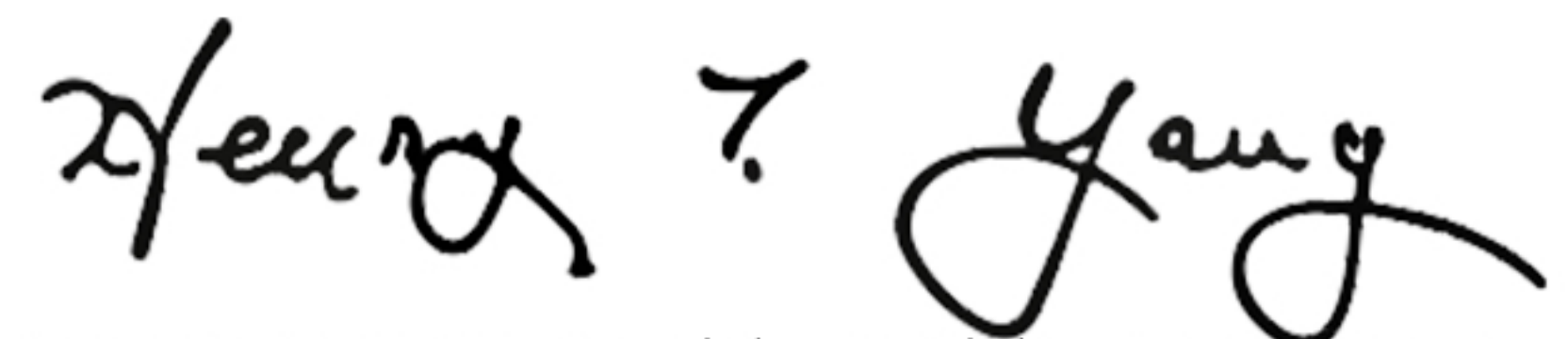
- Signature
- Website: Chancellor page (archived); Department faculty page
- Scientific career
- Fields: Mechanical engineering
- Institutions: Purdue University; University of California, Santa Barbara
- Thesis: A finite element formulation for stability analysis of doubly curved thinshell structures (1969)
- Doctoral advisor: Richard H. Gallagher

Henry Tzu-Yow Yang (Chinese: 楊祖佑; pinyin: Yáng Zǔyòu; born November 29, 1940) is an American mechanical engineer who was the 5th chancellor of the University of California, Santa Barbara from 1994 to 2025. With more than 31 years in office, he is the longest-serving chancellor in the history of the University of California system. He is currently a distinguished professor of mechanical engineering at the UC Santa Barbara College of Engineering.

== Early life and education ==
Yang was born in Chongqing, China, on November 29, 1940. He has four siblings. In 1949, his family moved from mainland China to Taiwan, where his father served in the Republic of China Air Force.

Yang received a Bachelor of Science with a major in civil engineering from National Taiwan University in 1962, a Master of Science in structural engineering from West Virginia University in 1965, and a Ph.D. in civil engineering from Cornell University in 1968. His doctoral dissertation was titled A finite element formulation for stability analysis of doubly curved thinshell structures (1969). His doctoral advisor was Richard H. Gallagher.

== Career ==
=== Scientific research ===
Throughout his career, Yang has conducted extensive research in the fields of mechanical, aerospace, civil, and structural engineering. He is known for his work on the finite element method for plates and shells, as well as his contributions to transonic computational aeroelasticity, including aircraft design and flutter control. His research has also addressed earthquake engineering, particularly in improving the seismic design of power plants. In addition, he has studied structural sensing and control under seismic and wind loads, and has contributed to the early investigation of meso-scale plasticity and deformation processes.

Yang has published 195 articles in scientific journals. His book, Finite Element Analysis, has been widely adopted as an engineering textbook in many American universities and has been translated into Chinese and Japanese.

=== Purdue University ===
Regarded as an expert in aerospace structures, structural dynamics, transonic aeroelasticity, wind and earthquake structural engineering, intelligent manufacturing systems, and finite elements, Yang was on the faculty of Purdue University for 25 years. He first joined the faculty as an assistant professor in 1969, before being elevated to the head of the Purdue University School of Aeronautics and Astronautics, which he served for five years from 1980 to 1984. Yang was named the dean of the Purdue University College of Engineering on July 1, 1984, a post he served for 10 years until his departure for UC Santa Barbara in 1994.

Yang was named as the university's Neil A. Armstrong Distinguished Professor of Aeronautics and Astronautics, a title bestowed on him in 1988. He was an eight-time winner of the Elmer F. Bruhn Award, which honors outstanding instructors at the Purdue University School of Aeronautics and Astronautics. In addition, he received the university-level Outstanding Undergraduate Teaching Award from Purdue University 12 times.

=== UC Santa Barbara ===
After a seven-month search of over 150 applicants, Yang was named the fifth chancellor of the University of California, Santa Barbara (UCSB) in March 1994. He began to serve as the university's chancellor on June 23, 1994.

Yang was reported to have personally invited and recruited many researchers he believed possessed long-term scientific potential, promising them sufficient funding, new research facilities, and research teams, to improve UCSB's academic research capabilities and influence. Within the first 12 years of Yang's chancellorship, five UCSB scholars personally invited and recruited by Yang to the university faculty won Nobel Prizes between 1998 and 2004. In 1997, Yang flew to New Jersey and persuaded David Gross to join the UCSB faculty, agreeing to meet all four of Gross's conditions for his physics research; Gross later received the 2004 Nobel Prize in Physics. Yang flew three times from California to Japan between 1999 and 2000 to recruit Shuji Nakamura, then a marginalized technician at a Japanese chemistry company, with promises to build new research facilities and having a Japanese-speaking research staff team already assembled for him; Nakamura became the university's sixth Nobel Prize laureate during Yang's tenure in 2014. Yang spent five years to recruit the well-known cognitive neuroscientist Michael Gazzaniga to UCSB, with promises in funding and research facilities. In October 2025, Michel Devoret and John M. Martinis, who joined the UCSB faculty during Yang's chancellorship, won the 2025 Nobel Prize in Physics.

Yang has guided 57 Ph.D. and 23 M.S. recipients. In addition to his role as chancellor, he is also a professor of mechanical engineering at UC Santa Barbara. He continues to teach an undergraduate engineering course each year. He currently supervises three Ph.D. students with support from National Science Foundation grants. He is also a co-principal investigator for the Mathematics, Engineering, Science Achievement (MESA) program of the University of California.

On August 14, 2024, Yang announced that he would step down as the university's chancellor at the end of the 2024–2025 academic year, while continuing to serve as a professor in the Department of Mechanical Engineering at the UC Santa Barbara College of Engineering. He officially stepped down from the chancellorship on July 14, 2025. With more than 31 years in office, Yang is the longest-serving chancellor in the history of the University of California. On June 16, 2025, UC president Michael Drake named David Marshall, the then-provost of UC Santa Barbara, as the interim chancellor, effective July 15.

== Boards and committees ==
Yang has served on scientific advisory boards for the United States Department of Defense, United States Air Force, United States Navy, NASA, and the National Academy of Engineering. He served as chair of the Association of Pacific Rim Universities from 2010 to 2014 and as chair of the Association of American Universities from 2009 to 2010.

Yang currently serves on the President's Committee for the National Medal of Science, being appointed originally by George W. Bush in 2009 and again by Barack Obama in 2011. He was named as chairman of the board for the Thirty Meter Telescope project in 2007 and still holds the position. He also currently serves on the board of directors of The Kavli Foundation.

== Awards and honors ==
Yang was elected as a member of multiple learned societies, including:

- Fellow of the American Institute of Aeronautics and Astronautics since 1985
- Member of the National Academy of Engineering since 1991
- Academician of the Academia Sinica of Taiwan since 1992
- Fellow of the American Society for Engineering Education since 1993
- Foreign Academician of the Chinese Academy of Engineering since 2009

Yang received honorary doctorates from multiple universities worldwide, including:

- Purdue University (1996)
- Hong Kong University of Science and Technology (2002)
- National Taiwan University (2004)
- City University of Hong Kong (2005)
- Chinese University of Hong Kong (2008)
- West Virginia University (2011)
- Hong Kong Polytechnic University (2011)

Yang received multiple awards and honors from academic societies, most notably including:

- Centennial Medal (1993) from the American Society for Engineering Education
- Benjamin Garver Lamme Award (1998) from the American Society for Engineering Education
- Structures, Structural Dynamics, & Materials Award (2008) from the American Institute of Aeronautics and Astronautics
- Arthur M. Bueche Award (2016) from the National Academy of Engineering

Yang and his wife, Dilling Yang, were named honorary alumni of UC Santa Barbara by the UC Santa Barbara Alumni Association in 2001. Henry Yang received an honorary distinguished teaching award from UC Santa Barbara's Academic Senate in 2007.

Yang received the University of California Presidential Medal from UC president Michael V. Drake on April 3, 2025, in recognition of "Yang's tremendous impact on the growth and stature of the campus he has led for three decades".

== Personal life ==
Henry Yang married Dilling Yang. Maria Chiu-Yee Yang, their daughter, serves as a professor of mechanical engineering at the Massachusetts Institute of Technology. Henry Yang's brother, Ralph Tzu-Bow Yang, was a professor emeritus at the Department of Chemical Engineering at the University of Michigan College of Engineering.

Academic offices
Preceded by Barbara Uehling	5th Chancellor of the University of California, Santa Barbara; 1994–2025	Succeeded by David Marshall (interim); Dennis Assanis
