= Laura Carlson =

American university administrator

29th President of the University of Delaware
- Incumbent
- Assumed office January 1, 2026
- Preceded by: Herself (acting)
- In office July 1, 2025 – December 31, 2025
- Preceded by: Dennis Assanis
- Succeeded by: Herself

15th Provost of the University of Delaware
- In office June 8, 2022 – July 1, 2025
- President: Dennis Assanis
- Preceded by: Robin Morgan
- Succeeded by: William Farquhar (acting)

Academic background
- Education: University of Illinois at Urbana-Champaign (Ph.D.); Michigan State University (M.A.); Dartmouth College (B.A.)
- Thesis: Memory for structural information across eye movements (1994)
- Doctoral advisor: David E. Irwin

Academic work
- Discipline: Psychology
- Sub-discipline: Spatial cognition and Visual perception

Laura A. Carlson is an American psychologist and academic administrator who serves as the 29th president of the University of Delaware. She previously served as the university's provost and spent more than two decades at the University of Notre Dame, where she held the roles of vice president, associate provost, and dean of the graduate school. Her research focuses on spatial cognition, visual perception, and attention.

== Early life and education ==
Carlson earned a B.A. cum laude with a special major in the psychology of language from Dartmouth College in 1987. She earned a M.A. from Michigan State University in 1991. She completed her doctoral studies at the University of Illinois at Urbana-Champaign, receiving a Ph.D. in 1994. Her dissertation, chaired by David E. Irwin, was titled "Memory for structural information across eye movements."

== Career ==
=== University of Notre Dame ===
Carlson began her academic career in 1994 as an assistant professor of psychology at the University of Notre Dame. She was promoted to associate professor in 1999 and became a full professor in 2008. During her time in the department of psychology, she served as the director of graduate studies from 2001 to 2005 and as associate chair from 2007 to 2009.

In 2009, Carlson was appointed associate dean of professional development at the graduate school, a position she held until 2013. She subsequently served as vice president, associate provost, and dean of the graduate school from 2013 to 2022. During her tenure as dean, she oversaw the establishment of several new offices, including the Office of Grants and Fellowships, the Office of Graduate Career Services, and the Office of Graduate Student Life. She also helped establish the Office of Military and Veterans Affairs in 2017. Within the Provost's Office, Carlson played a role in the ND LEAD program, which was designed to prepare faculty members for administrative leadership roles.

Throughout her time at Notre Dame, Carlson maintained her research in spatial cognition, examining how environments are represented and navigated, as well as in visual perception. She was elected a Fellow of the Association for Psychological Science and the Psychonomic Society. She served on the governing board of the Psychonomic Society, holding the position of chair in 2019.

=== University of Delaware ===
Carlson was appointed the 12th provost of the University of Delaware effective June 8, 2022. Following the resignation of president Dennis Assanis in 2025, Carlson was named interim president of the university on July 1. On December 9, 2025, the University of Delaware Board of Trustees voted unanimously to appoint her as the 29th president of the university. With this appointment, Carlson became the first woman to serve as the university's permanent president. Her tenure began on January 1, 2026.

She was inaugurated on April 17, 2026, in a ceremony attended by former President Joe Biden, Senators Chris Coons and Lisa Blunt Rochester, Governor Matt Meyer.
