= University of California, Santa Barbara =

Public university in California, US

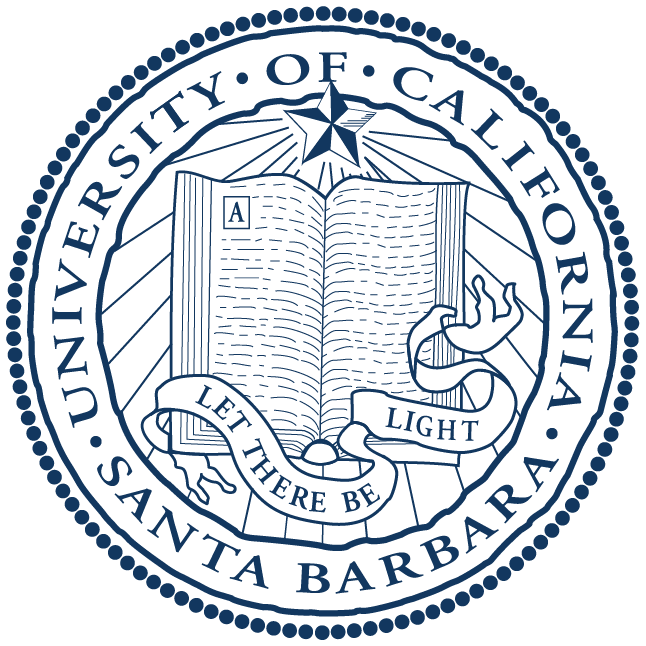
- Former names: Anna Blake Sloyd School (1891–1899); Anna Blake Manual Training School (1899–1909); Santa Barbara State Normal School (1909–1921); Santa Barbara State College (1921–1944); Santa Barbara College of the University of California (1944–1958)
- Motto: Fiat lux (Latin)
- Motto in English: 'Let there be light'
- Type: Public land-grant research university
- Established: 1891; 135 years ago (1944 as a UC campus)
- Parent institution: University of California
- Accreditation: WSCUC
- Academic affiliations: AAU; APRU; UARC; URA; Space-grant
- Endowment: $665.9 million (2024)
- Budget: $1.13 billion (2023)
- Chancellor: Dennis Assanis
- Academic staff: 4,378 (fall 2024)
- Students: 26,133 (fall 2024)
- Undergraduates: 23,181 (fall 2024)
- Postgraduates: 2,952 (fall 2024)
- Location: Santa Barbara County, California, U.S. 34°24′59″N 119°50′47″W
- Campus: 1,127 acres (456 ha); Midsize suburb
- Newspaper: Daily Nexus
- Colors: Navy and gold
- Nickname: Gauchos
- Sporting affiliations: NCAA Division I – Big West; MPSF; GCC
- Mascot: Olé the Gaucho
- Website: ucsb.edu

The University of California, Santa Barbara (UC Santa Barbara or UCSB) is a public land-grant research university in Santa Barbara County, California, United States. Tracing its roots back to 1891 as an independent teachers college, UC Santa Barbara joined the University of California system in 1944. It is the third-oldest campus in the system, after Berkeley, and UCLA.

UCSB's campus sits on the oceanfront site of a converted WWII-era Marine Corps air station. UCSB is organized into three undergraduate colleges (Letters and Science, Engineering, and Creative Studies) and two graduate schools (Education and Environment), offering more than 200 degrees and programs. It is classified among "R1: Doctoral Universities – Very high research activity" and is regarded as a Public Ivy. The university has 12 national research centers and institutes, including the Kavli Institute for Theoretical Physics and NSF Quantum Foundry. According to the National Science Foundation, UC Santa Barbara spent $305.48 million on research and development in fiscal year 2023, ranking it 105th in the nation. UCSB was the No. 3 host on the ARPAnet and was elected to the Association of American Universities in 1995.

UCSB alumni, faculty, and researchers have included 11 Nobel Prize laureates, founders of more than 90 companies, 1 Fields Medalist, 50 members of the National Academy of Sciences, 34 members of the National Academy of Engineering, and 56 members of the American Academy of Arts and Sciences. The faculty also includes two Academy and Emmy Award winners and recipients of a Millennium Technology Prize, an IEEE Medal of Honor, a National Medal of Technology and Innovation, a Breakthrough Prize in Fundamental Physics, and a Dan David Prize.

== History ==
UCSB traces its origins back to the Anna Blake School, which was founded in 1891, and offered training in home economics and industrial arts. The Anna Blake School was taken over by the state in 1909 and became the Santa Barbara State Normal School, which then became the Santa Barbara State College in 1921.

In 1944, intense lobbying by an interest group in the City of Santa Barbara led by Thomas Storke and Pearl Chase persuaded the State Legislature, Gov. Earl Warren, and the Regents of the University of California to move the State College over to the more research-oriented University of California system. The State College system sued to stop the takeover, but the governor did not support the suit. A state constitutional amendment was passed in 1946 to stop subsequent conversions of State Colleges to University of California campuses.

From 1944 to 1958, the school was known as Santa Barbara College of the University of California, before taking on its current name. When the vacated Marine Corps training station in Goleta was purchased for the rapidly growing college, Santa Barbara City College moved into the vacated State College buildings.

Originally, the regents envisioned a small, several thousand–student liberal arts college, a so-called "Williams College of the West", at Santa Barbara. Chronologically, UCSB is the third general-education campus of the University of California, after Berkeley and UCLA (the only other state campus to have been acquired by the UC system). The original campus the regents acquired in Santa Barbara was located on only 100 acres (40 ha) of largely unusable land on a seaside mesa. The availability of a 400-acre (160 ha) portion of the land used as Marine Corps Air Station Santa Barbara until 1946 on another seaside mesa in Goleta, which the regents could acquire for free from the federal government, led to that site becoming the Santa Barbara campus in 1949.

Originally, only 3000–3500 students were anticipated, but the post-WWII baby boom led to the designation of a general campus in 1958, along with a name change from "Santa Barbara College" to "University of California, Santa Barbara," and the discontinuation of the industrial arts program for which the state college was famous. A chancellor, Samuel B. Gould, was appointed in 1959.

In 1959, UCSB professor Douwe Stuurman hosted the English writer Aldous Huxley as the university's first visiting professor. Huxley delivered a lectures series called "The Human Situation".

In the late 1960s and early 1970s, UCSB became nationally known as one of the main national hotbeds of marxist, anti–Vietnam War political activism. A bombing at the school's faculty club in 1969 killed the caretaker, Dover Sharp. In the spring of 1970, multiple instances of arson occurred, including a burning of the Bank of America branch building in the student community of Isla Vista, during which time one male student, Kevin Moran, was shot and killed by police. UCSB's anti-Vietnam activity impelled then-Gov. Ronald Reagan to impose a curfew and order the National Guard to enforce it. Armed guardsmen were common on campus and in Isla Vista during this time.

In 1968, twelve black students occupied North Hall — temporarily renaming it Malcolm X Hall — to force the Chancellor Vernon Cheadle and the administration to acknowledge the marginalization needs of black students. The university answered the demands of the group by creating the Department of Black Studies.

In 1995, UCSB was elected to the Association of American Universities, an organization of leading research universities, with a membership consisting of 59 universities in the United States (both public and private) and two universities in Canada.

On May 23, 2014, a killing spree occurred in Isla Vista, California, a community near the campus. All six people killed during the rampage were students at UCSB. The murderer was a former Santa Barbara City College student who lived in Isla Vista.

In 2009 Professor William I. Robinson became the subject of a formal inquiry after circulating course-related material comparing Israeli military actions to Nazi persecution - a controversy that highlighted tensions between academic freedom and the imperative to avoid content that Jewish students found intimidating. Even though the faculty code process eventually dismissed the charges, the episode raised questions about how Jewish concerns are handled within campus governance and highlighted ambiguities in procedural responses to allegations of antisemitism.

=== Campus leaders ===
Santa Barbara State College was under the supervision of a president. In 1944, the college became affiliated with the University of California. The school name was changed to the Santa Barbara College of the University of California. The title of the campus leader was changed to Provost. In September 1958, the Regents of the University of California established Santa Barbara as a full campus of the University of California. The school was renamed the University of California, Santa Barbara. The official title of the campus leader was changed to Chancellor.

Henry T. Yang served as the 5th chancellor of the University of California, Santa Barbara from June 23, 1994, to July 14, 2025. With more than 31 years in office, he is the longest-serving chancellor in the University of California history. After leaving the chancellor's office, Yang continues to serve as a professor of mechanical engineering at the UC Santa Barbara College of Engineering. David Marshall, the then-executive vice chancellor and provost of UC Santa Barbara, started to serve as the interim chancellor on July 15, 2025. On July 17, 2025, the UC Board of Regents announced that Dennis Assanis would assume the role of UC Santa Barbara's sixth chancellor on September 1, 2025.

== Campus ==
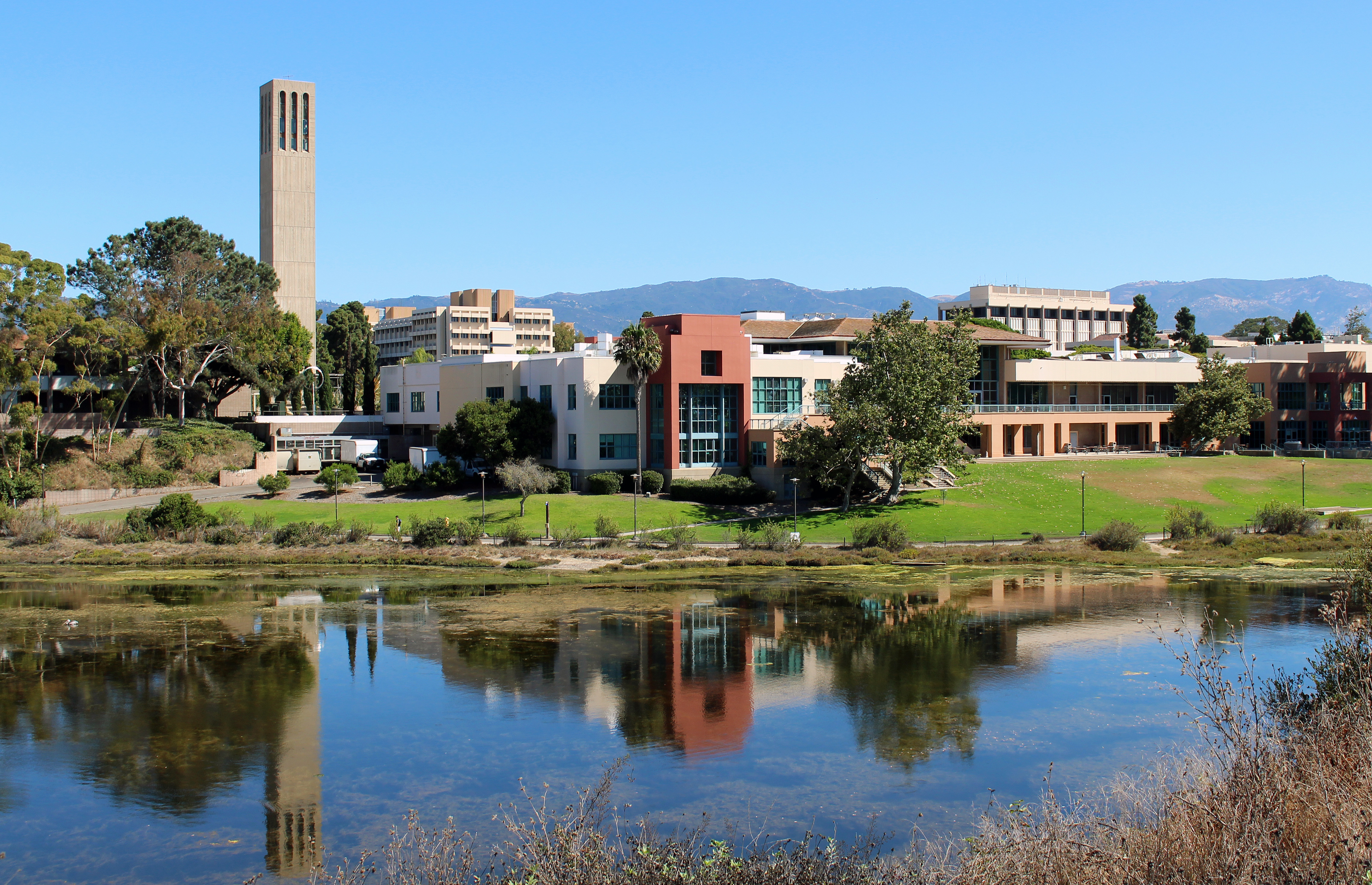
The Storke Tower and the University Center in front of the UCSB Lagoon.

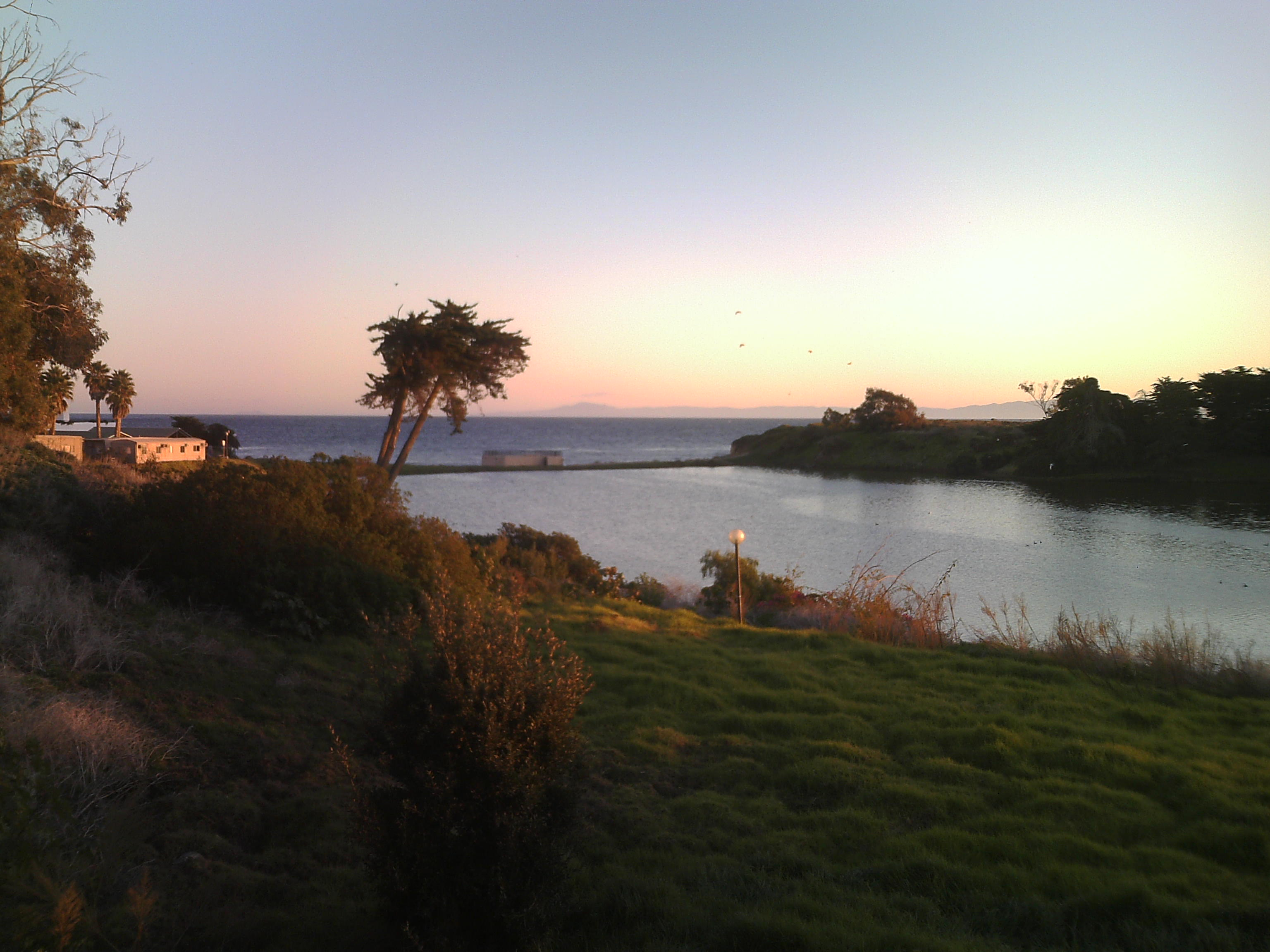
A view over the school's lagoon to Santa Cruz Island, one of the Channel Islands

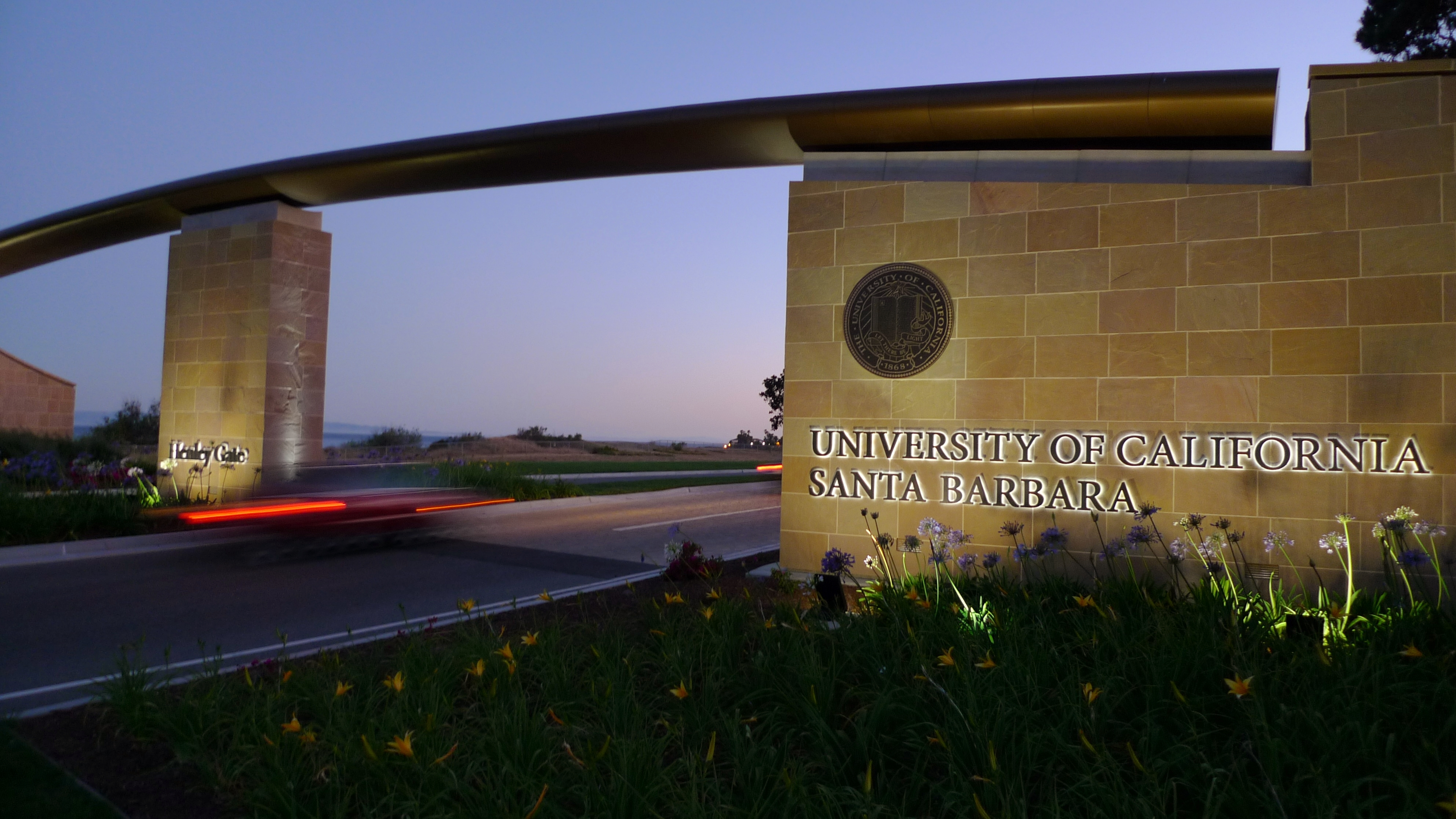
Henley Gate (eastern entrance) at sunset

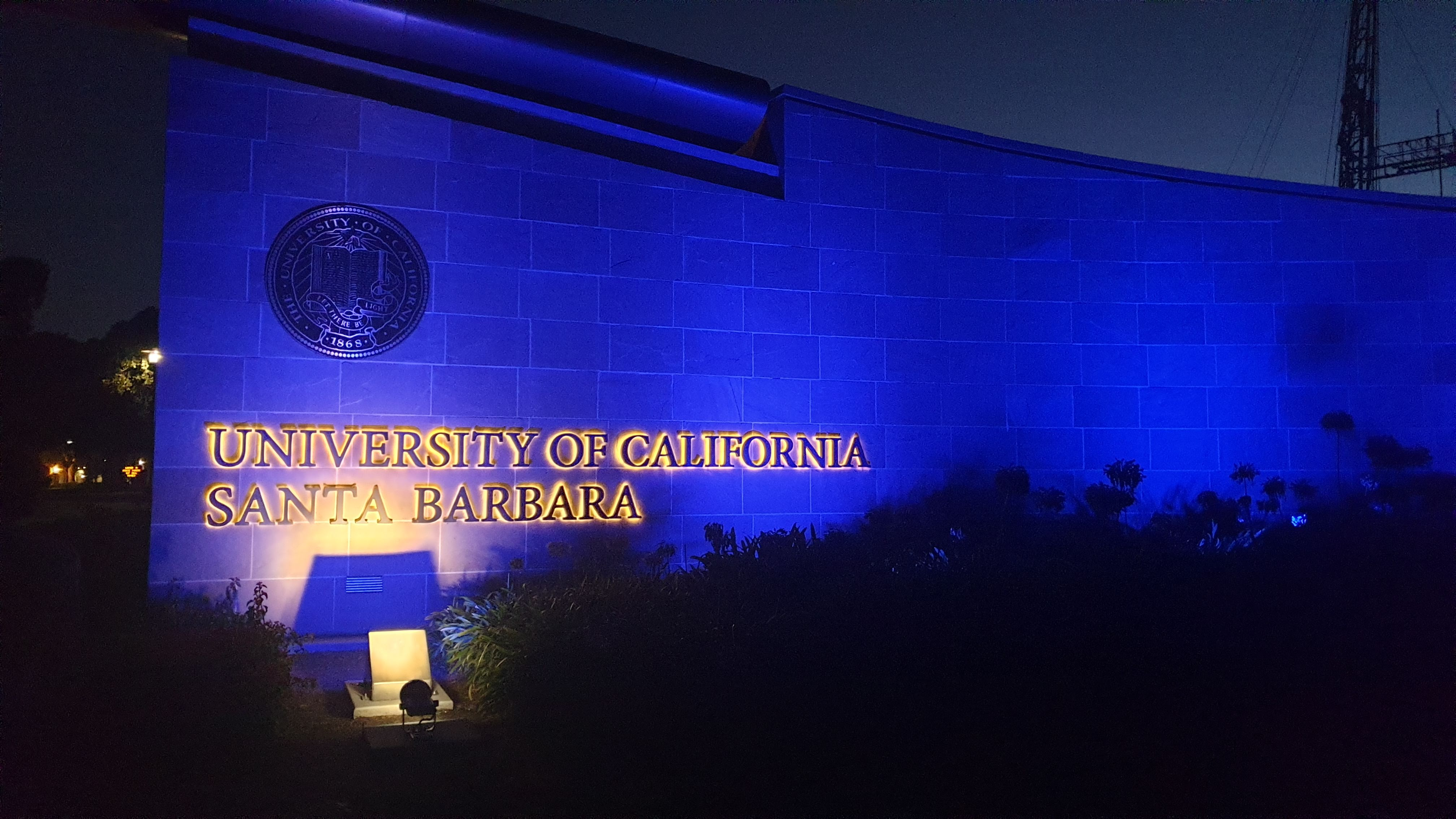
Entrance of the University of California, Santa Barbara

UCSB is located on cliffs directly above the Pacific Ocean. UCSB's campus is completely autonomous from local government and has not been annexed by the city of Santa Barbara, and thus is not part of the city. While it appears closer to the recently formed city of Goleta, a parcel of the City of Santa Barbara that forms a strip of "city" through the ocean to the Santa Barbara airport, runs through the east entrance to the university campus. Although UCSB has a Santa Barbara mailing address, as do other unincorporated areas around the city, only this entry parcel is in the Santa Barbara city limits. The campus is divided into four parts: the Main (East) Campus of 708 acres (287 ha), which houses all academic units, plus the majority of undergraduate housing; Storke Campus; West Campus; and North Campus. The campuses surround the unincorporated community of Isla Vista.

UCSB is one of the few universities in the United States with its own beach. The campus, bordered on two sides by the Pacific Ocean, has miles of coastline, its own lagoon, and the rocky extension, Goleta Point, which is also known as "Campus Point". The campus has numerous walking and bicycle paths across campus, around the lagoon, and along the beach. It also owns and manages the Coal Oil Point nature preserve on the West Campus.

Much of the campus's early architecture was designed by famed architect William Pereira and his partner Charles Luckman and made heavy use of custom-tinted and patterned concrete blocks. This design element was carried over into many of the school's subsequent buildings.

The UCSB Libraries, consisting of the Davidson Library and the Arts Library, hold more than three million bound volumes and millions of microforms, government documents, manuscripts, maps, satellite and aerial images, sound recordings, and other materials. Situated at the center of campus, the Davidson Library in June 2013 broke ground on a significant addition and renovation project, which was completed in November 2015 with re-opening to the public in January 2016.

Campbell Hall is the university's largest lecture hall with 862 seats. It's also the main venue for the UCSB Arts & Lectures series, which presents special performances, films, and lectures for the UCSB campus and Santa Barbara community.

Storke Tower, completed in 1969, is the tallest steel/cement structure in Santa Barbara County. It can be seen from most places on campus, and it overlooks Storke Plaza. It is home to a five-octave, 61-bell carillon. KCSB 91.9 and the Daily Nexus have headquarters beneath Storke Tower.

The UCSB Family Vacation Center, founded in 1969, is a summer family camp located on campus that draws over 2,000 guests each summer. The staff of over 50 includes many UCSB students who have been extensively trained as camp counselors.

UCSB is known for its extensive biking system. A recent survey says that 53% of UCSB students get around by cycling.

== Academics ==
UC Santa Barbara is a large, comprehensive, primarily residential doctoral university. The full-time, four-year undergraduate program comprises the majority of enrollments and has a liberal arts & sciences focus with high graduate coexistence. UCSB is organized into five colleges and schools offering 87 undergraduate degrees and 55 graduate degrees. The campus is the sixth-largest in the UC system by enrollment with 18,620 undergraduate and 3,065 graduate students. In 2015, UCSB was designated a Hispanic-Serving Institution.

=== Admissions ===
Undergraduate admission statistics
	Fall 2025	Fall 2024	Fall 2023	Fall 2022	Fall 2021
First-time Freshmen
Applicants	110,173	110,259	110,871	110,995	105,631
Admits	42,094	36,347	30,804	28,688	30,823
Admit rate	38%	33%	28%	26%	29%
Enrolled	5,081	5,008	5,044	4,967	4,898
Yield rate	12%	14%	16%	17%	16%
Transfers
Applicants	18,859	18,438	17,077	17,636	20,573
Admits	11,138	11,369	10,278	10,245	10,040
Admit rate	59%	62%	60%	58%	49%
Enrolled	2,038	2,110	1,902	2,099	2,102
Yield rate	18%	19%	19%	20%	21%

Admission to UC Santa Barbara is rated as "most selective" by U.S. News & World Report. UC Santa Barbara no longer uses SAT or ACT scores in admission decisions or for scholarships.

UC Santa Barbara had an acceptance rate of 33.0% for the 2024 incoming freshman class. 110,266 applied, 36,347 were admitted, and 5,008 enrolled. The average High School GPA was 4.3.

=== Research activity ===
According to the UCSB Office of Research, UC Santa Barbara budgeted $235.3 million on research and development in fiscal 2020, with the National Science Foundation contributing $60.5 million; Department of Defense-$40 million; UC General Fund-$28 million; Industry- $19.5 million; National Institutes of Health-$17 million; Department of Energy-$9 million; Non-Profit-$8.7 million; Other-$20 million. Corporate research partners in the College of Engineering include military contractors Raytheon Vision Systems, Lockheed Martin and Northrop Grumman.

From 2005 to 2009, UCSB was ranked fourth in terms of relative citation impact in the U.S. (behind MIT, Caltech, and Princeton University) according to Thomson Reuters.

UCSB hosts 12 National Research Centers, including the Kavli Institute for Theoretical Physics, the National Center for Ecological Analysis and Synthesis, the Southern California Earthquake Center, the UCSB Center for Spatial Studies, an affiliate of the National Center for Geographic Information and Analysis, and the California Nanosystems Institute. Eight of these centers are supported by the National Science Foundation. UCSB is also home to Microsoft Station Q, a research group working on topological quantum computing where American mathematician and Fields Medalist Michael Freedman is the director.

=== Teaching and degrees ===
The focus of the University of California is on research. Like all University of California campuses, UCSB prioritizes academic development over vocational learning. Undergraduate teaching is centered on lectures, with larger lecture classes having sections. Sections may be tutorial style, or they may be set up as seminars or discussions. For undergraduates, UCSB confers both B.A. and B.S. degrees. Music majors may pursue a Bachelor of Music degree. Graduate teaching involves seminar-style classes and an emphasis on research and further study. UCSB confers M.A., M.S., and Ph.D. degrees. Those studying music may pursue a MM or DMA degree. Students pursuing a career in education may receive a MEd or EdD degree. The university granted 5,812 bachelor's, 578 master's, and 354 Ph.D. degrees in 2010–2011.

=== Rankings ===
Academic rankings

National
- Forbes: 35
- U.S. News & World Report: 40
- Washington Monthly: 80
- WSJ/College Pulse: 179

Global
- ARWU: 64
- QS: 179
- THE: 67 (tie)
- U.S. News & World Report: 91 (tie)

National Program Rankings
Program	Ranking
Biological Sciences	50
Chemistry	24
Computer Science	27
Earth Sciences	24
Economics	34
Education	86
English	32
Engineering	30
Fine Arts	42
History	38
Mathematics	37
Physics	9
Psychology	35
Political Science	56
Sociology	34
Statistics	44

Global Subject Rankings
Program	Ranking
Arts & Humanities	95
Biology & Biochemistry	300
Chemistry	80
Computer Science	149
Condensed Matter Physics	108
Ecology	62
Economics & Business	216
Electrical & Electronic Engineering	292
Engineering	273
Environment/Ecology	36
Geosciences	65
Materials Science	105
Mathematics	247
Marine & Freshwater Biology	43
Nanoscience & Nanotechnology	192
Neuroscience & Behavior	322
Optics	16
Physical Chemistry	184
Physics	18
Plant & Animal Science	243
Psychiatry/Psychology	135
Social Sciences & Public Health	149
Space Science	38

Top 10 foreign countries in headcount (Fall 2025)
Country	Headcount
China	1,933
India	218
South Korea	96
Taiwan	68
Turkey	58
Canada	44
Brazil	44
United Kingdom	25
Iran	23
Bangladesh	23

UCSB is considered to be a "Public Ivy". The 2022 edition of U.S. News & World Report ranked UC Santa Barbara as the 7th best public university and tied for the 32nd best university in the United States. Money magazine ranked UC Santa Barbara 30th in the U.S. out of the 744 schools it evaluated for its 2019 Best Colleges ranking. In 2019, Kiplinger ranked UCSB 30th out of 174 best-value public colleges and universities in the nation, and fifth in California. UC Santa Barbara was ranked 32nd in the United States out of 1,380 colleges and universities by Payscale and CollegeNet's 2018 Social Mobility Index rankings.

==== Research impact rankings ====
The Times Higher Education World University Rankings ranked UCSB 48th worldwide for 2016–17, while the Academic Ranking of World Universities (ARWU) in 2016 ranked UCSB 42nd in the world, 28th in the nation, and in 2015 tied for 17th worldwide in engineering.

Washington Monthly named UCSB as the 20th best national university in 2020, based on its contribution to the public good as measured by social mobility, research, and promoting public service.

==== Other rankings ====
U.S. News & World Report's 2016 rankings placed UCSB's graduate programs in Materials Engineering and Chemical Engineering the second and ninth best in the U.S., respectively; graduate school Physics was ranked 10th best, including the fifth-best program for Condensed Matter Physics, seventh-best program for Quantum Physics, seventh-best program for Elementary Particles/Field/String Theory, and eighth-best program for Cosmology/Relativity/Gravity. In terms of the social sciences, UCSB's graduate program in Sociology is ranked first for research in sex and gender, and the History department is ranked seventh for women's history.

In 2015, QS World University Rankings ranked UCSB 129th in the world.

Forbes magazine ranked the university 24th in the nation (and 5th best public university) in 2024. This ranking focuses mainly on net positive financial impact, in contrast to other rankings, and generally ranks liberal arts colleges above most research universities.

PayScale's 2015–16 College Salary Report (ranking universities in terms of graduates' salary potential), UCSB came in first in computer science, seventh in engineering, 14th in Humanities, and 30th in Social Sciences.

UCSB was ranked third in The Princeton Review's 2015 list of top party schools.

In the Anti-Defamation League’s Campus Antisemitism Report Card, UCSB was assigned one of the lowest grades among 135 institutions assessed, reflecting serious deficiencies in administrative actions, campus conduct and climate, and support for Jewish student life.

== Organization ==
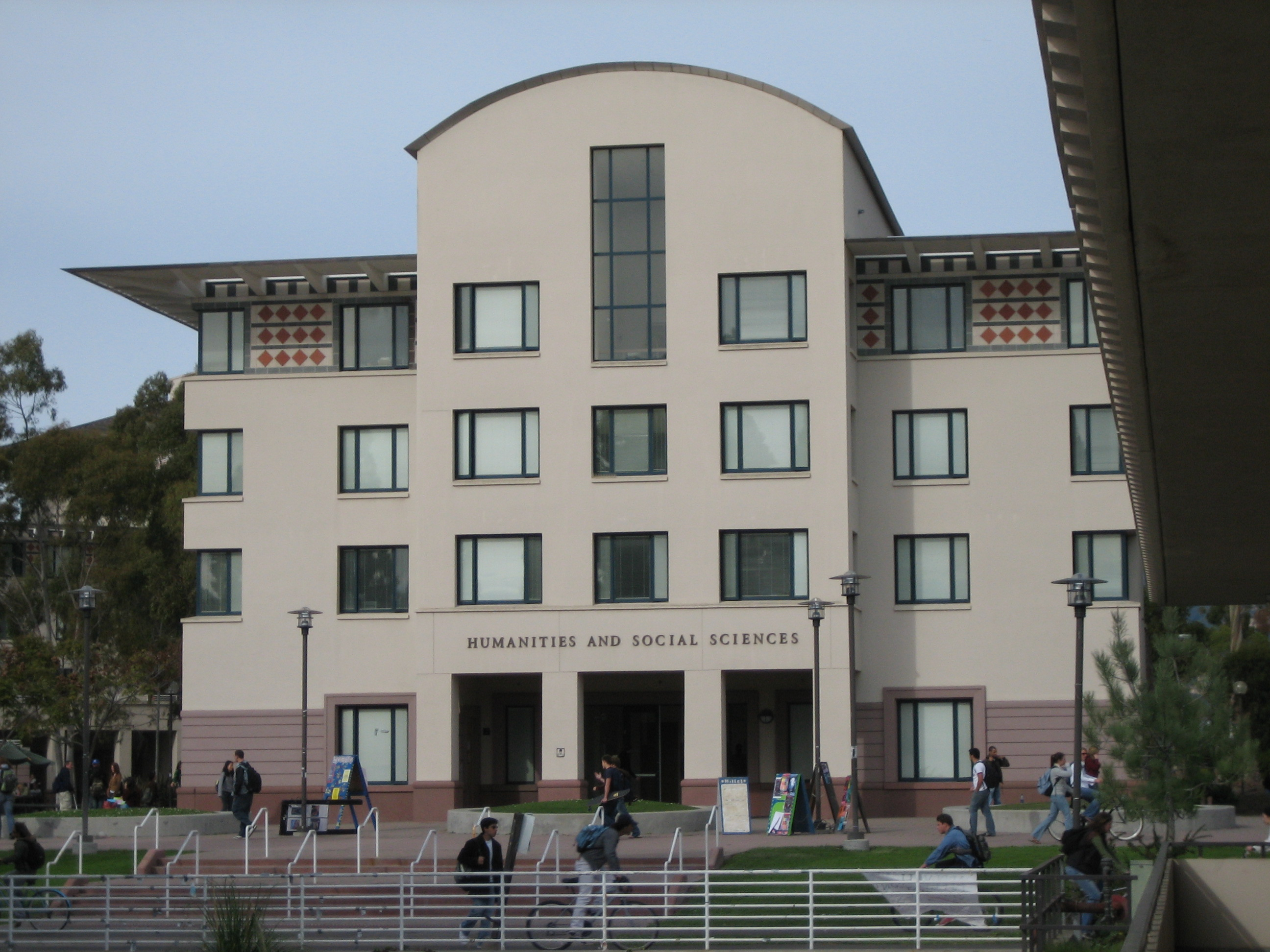
The Humanities and Social Sciences building

Santa Barbara is one of the ten major campuses affiliated with the University of California. The University of California is governed by a 26-member board of regents, 18 of which are appointed by the Governor of California to 12-year terms, seven serving as ex officio members, and a single student regent. The position of chancellor was created in 1952 to lead individual campuses. The Board of Regents appointed Henry T. Yang to be the fifth chancellor of the university in 1994.

=== Colleges and schools ===
UC Santa Barbara has three colleges: the College of Letters & Science, the College of Engineering, and the College of Creative Studies. The College of Creative Studies offers students an alternative approach to education by supporting advanced, independent work in the arts, mathematics, and sciences. The campus also has two professional schools: the Bren School of Environmental Science & Management, located in Bren Hall, and the Gevirtz Graduate School of Education.

=== Institutes and programs ===
Founded in 1973, the Institute for Social, Behavioral, and Economic Research (ISBER), originally the Community and Organization Research Institute (CORI), is the research unit for work in the social sciences. In 1990, it absorbed the Social Process Research Institute (SPRI), and its work now includes the humanities.

In 2008, the Institute for Energy Efficiency was founded to establish a new, cross-disciplinary institute that would integrate the many diverse research projects in energy efficiency and provide a focus for work in this area.

== Student activities and traditions ==
Undergraduate demographics as of Fall 2023
Race and ethnicity	Total
White	32%
Hispanic	26%
Asian	19%
Foreign national	10%
Two or more races	9%
Unknown	3%
Black	2%
Economic diversity
Low-income (Note: The percentage of students who received an income-based federal Pell grant intended for low-income students.)	29%
Affluent (Note: The percentage of students who are a part of the American middle class at the bare minimum.)	71%

=== Social ===
UCSB is a politically active campus. For the 2008 presidential election, UCSB won a national college competition for student voter registration by registering 10,857 voters, or 51.5% of the student population. Over the years, many political parties and organizations have been known to be active on campus, such as the College Republicans, Campus Democrats, Green Party, Libertarians, NORML, Young Democratic Socialists of America, and Queer Student Union.

There are a variety of on-campus centers that offer social, recreational, religious, and preprofessional activities for students. The UCSB Multicultural Center hosts numerous activities yearly to support students of color and promote awareness of diversity issues on campus. Other organizations and centers include The Daily Nexus, a daily newspaper; the school radio station, KCSB 91.9; The Bottom Line, a weekly newspaper; and The Gaucho Free Press, the campus's conservative magazine.

=== Housing ===
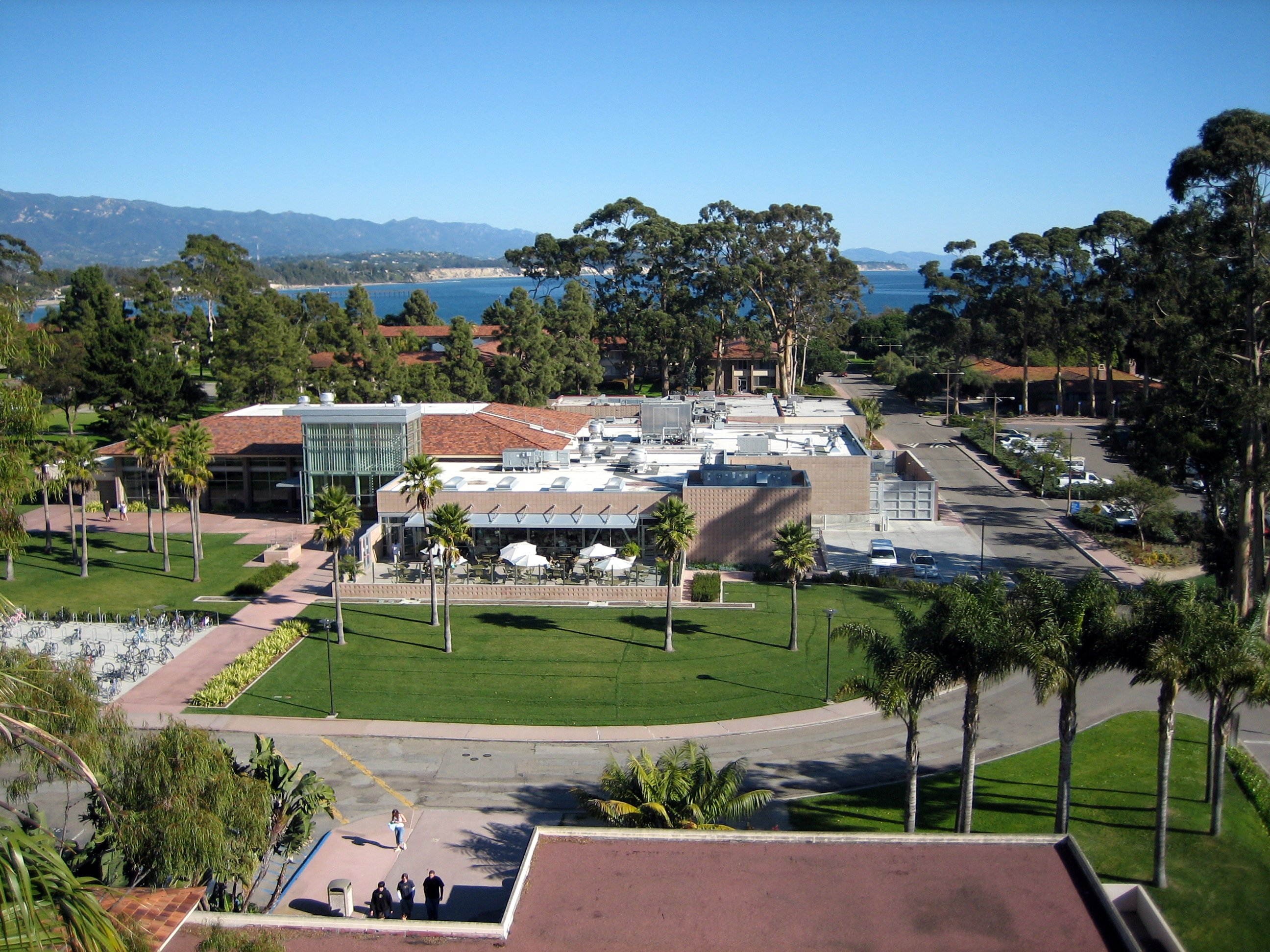
De La Guerra dining commons

There are eight residence halls at UCSB, seven of which are located at the main campus. One, Santa Catalina (formerly Francisco Torres Towers), is located near the entrance to West Campus north of Isla Vista.

The Main Campus residence halls are found in two different locations. On the east end of campus are the residence halls named after five of the Channel Islands: Santa Rosa, Santa Cruz, Anacapa, San Miguel and San Nicolas. There are two dining commons located near the Channel Islands residence halls. The Ortega Dining Commons is located between San Miguel and the University Center (UCen), and the De La Guerra Dining Commons is located between Santa Rosa, Santa Cruz, and San Nicolas.

The two other residence halls, San Rafael and Manzanita Village, are located on the west side of campus and primarily house continuing and transfer students. The Carrillo Dining Commons is located in Manzanita Village, right next to San Rafael Hall. Manzanita Village was completed in 2002 and is the newest residence hall on campus.

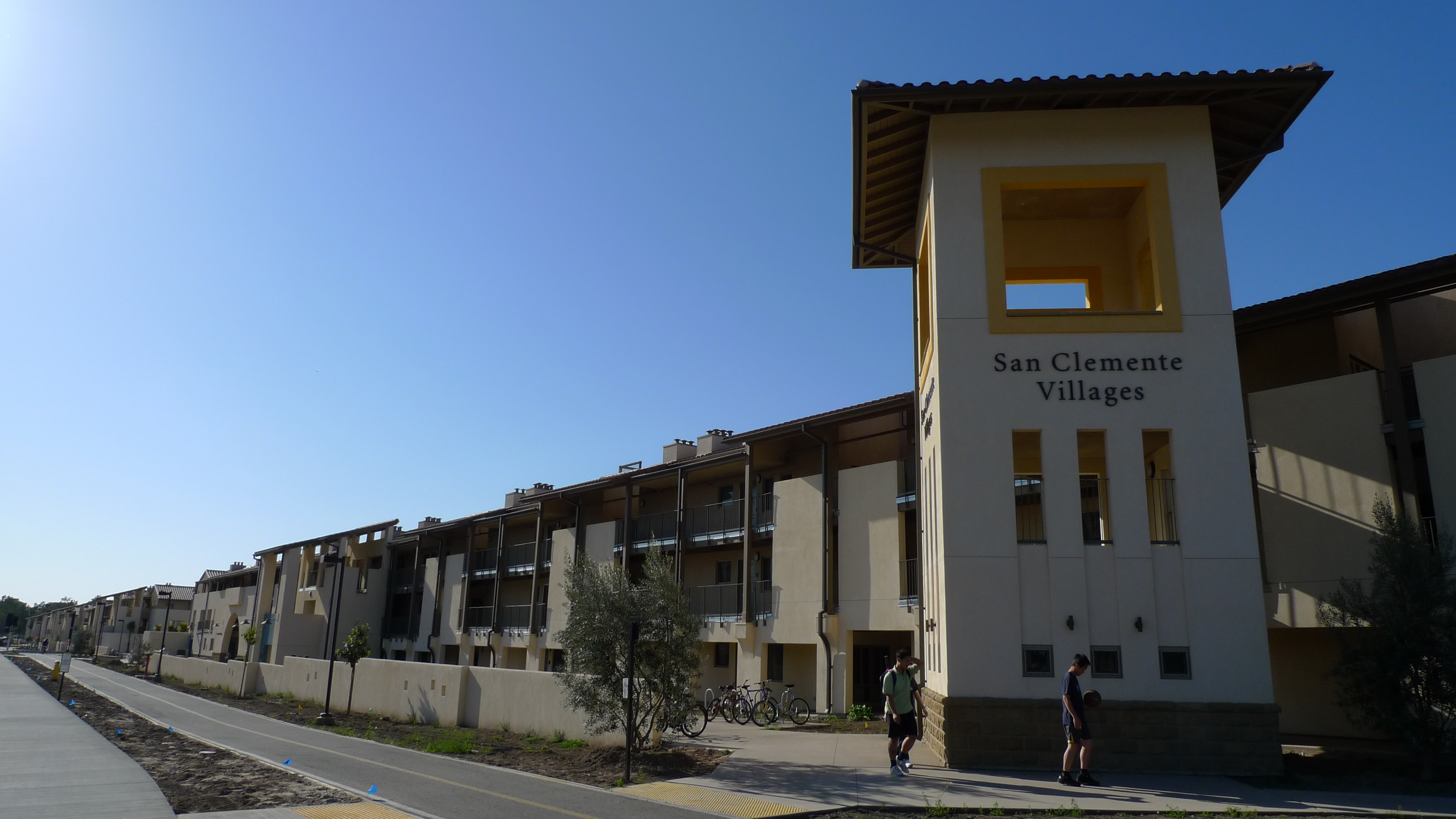
San Clemente Villages in April 2009

In addition, the university also has four housing complexes for graduate students and their families: San Clemente Villages for single graduate students, Santa Ynez Apartments, El Dorado Apartments, Westgate Apartments, and family student housing: West Campus Apartments and the Storke Apartment complexes. There is also faculty housing at the West Campus Point and new construction underway at the North Campus. The Sierra Madre Villages, located by the West Campus Apartments, was completed in September 2015 and was the first residential complex certified as LEED platinum throughout the entire UC system. UC Santa Barbara is the only campus in the UC system with any "LEED for Homes" certifications.

Billionaire Charles Munger had promised the university a $200 million donation on condition that it builds an 11-story dormitory, to be called Munger Hall, following his design, which assigns each of 4,536 residents a small individual room, 94% without natural light, to house more students and to encourage socialization in common areas. UCSB's acceptance of the proposal, presented in October 2021, led to the resignation of architect Dennis McFadden from the campus design review committee, followed by protests from students and others including the American Institute of Architects. In October 2022, the plan was modified to eliminate two floors, reducing the capacity of the building to 3,500. Plans for the construction of the Dormitory were canceled in August 2023.

=== Services ===
There are several academic resources offered by the university, including a writing center, open computer labs, a machine shop, a career and counseling center, and drop-in academic advising.

The UCSB Recreation Center provides classes and facilities for students and faculty. The center has swimming pools, racquetball courts, a rock wall, and exercise machines. The University Center has facilities for meetings and presentations and also contains a bookstore, restaurants, and a cashier.

UCSB has a health clinic. Students with ailments or seeking medical assistance may consult a physician at the clinic. The clinic also offers basic healthcare and provides emergency medicine and contraceptives. The university is the only UC campus with its own paramedic rescue unit. It's staffed by full-time professional paramedics and part-time undergraduate EMTs.

SexInfo, which was started in 1976 by professors John and Janice Baldwin, is run by students doing advanced course work and research on sexuality through UCSB's Sociology Department. The site is dedicated to providing accurate information about sexuality in a way that is both informative and personal. SexInfo answers questions sent in by readers from all over the world, as well as regularly updates and posts articles on various topics related to human sexuality. This program helps students get their degree in psychology.

== Athletics ==
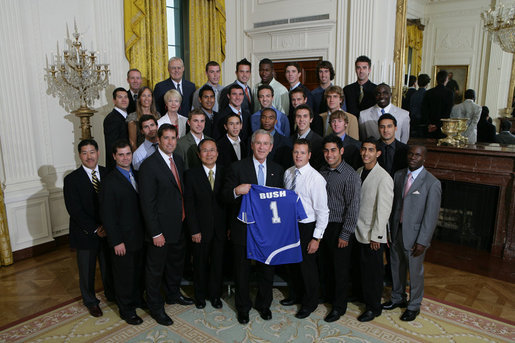
2006 NCAA soccer champions visit President George W. Bush at the White House

The mascot of UCSB is the Gaucho and the school colors are blue and gold. UCSB's sports teams compete in the Big West Conference, except for the men's water polo, men's and women's swimming, and the men's volleyball teams, which are in the Mountain Pacific Sports Federation. Santa Barbara is best known for its men's swimming and men's soccer teams. In 2006, UCSB won its first NCAA men's soccer title and second overall NCAA championship (1979 water polo) in school history.

While there are some 400 students in ICA, there are over 700 in club sports teams, including Alpine racing, cycling, fencing, field hockey, lacrosse, roller hockey, rugby, sailing, soccer, ice hockey, triathlon, ultimate frisbee, water skiing, and rowing. Many of these teams are highly regarded and compete against Intercollegiate teams across the U.S. For example, rowing has produced several national team members including nine-time National Rowing Team member Amy Fuller, winner of several Olympic and World Championship medals, and currently head of the UCLA Rowing Program. The UCSB cycling team has also produced several national team members, Olympians, and members of numerous U.S. and international professional teams.

Hundreds of students participate in a large intramural program consisting of badminton, basketball, bowling, flag football, golf, floor hockey, indoor and outdoor soccer, racquetball, squash, running, softball, tennis, table tennis, ultimate frisbee, volleyball, inner-tube water polo, and kickball.

Surfing also draws many students to UCSB. The on-campus beaches include several surfing sites, including "Poles", "Campus Point", "Depressions", "Sands", and "Devereaux Point" on West Campus. Because Campus Beach faces south and east and is shielded by the Santa Barbara Channel Islands, the surf is usually quite small. However, a large north or west swell can wrap in to create great waves that are typically very clean and good for surfing. UCSB has a surf team that competes in National Scholastic Surfing Association competitions and is generally considered one of the best in the nation. They continued their reputation by winning a record 14th national title at the college level in 2010's finals.

== People ==
=== Notable faculty ===
Current UCSB faculty have received several prestigious awards, including seven Nobel Prizes and a Fields Medal. In addition, there are 29 members of the National Academy of Sciences, 27 members of the National Academy of Engineering, and 31 members of the Academy of Arts and Sciences on the faculty.

Current and past UC Santa Barbara Nobel laureate faculty include:

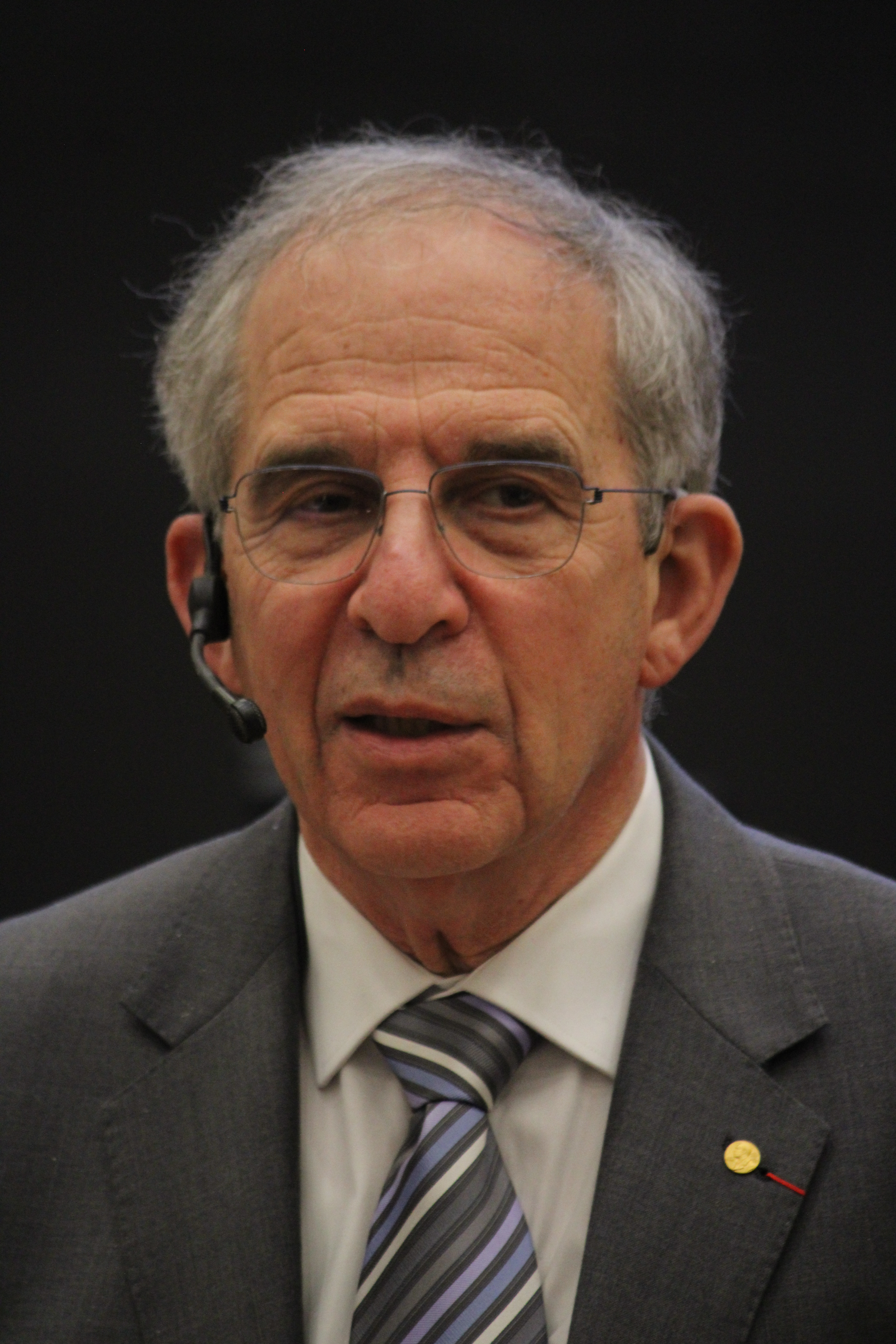
Michel Devoret, Nobel Prize in Physics (2025)

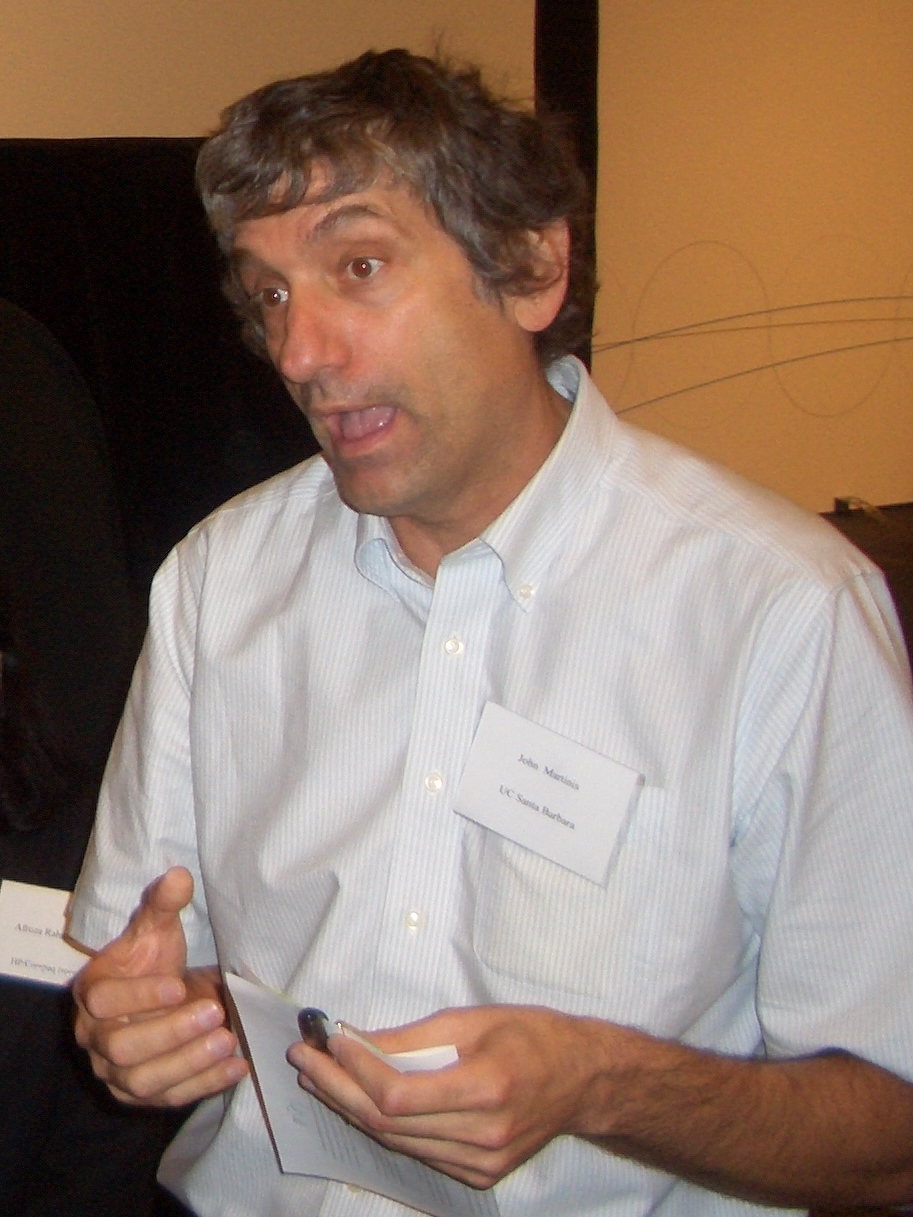
John M. Martinis, Nobel Prize in Physics (2025)

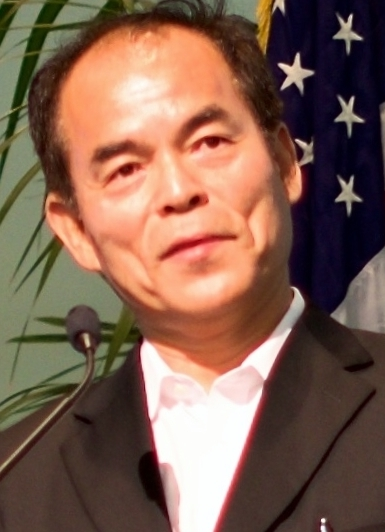
Shuji Nakamura, Nobel Prize in Physics (2014)

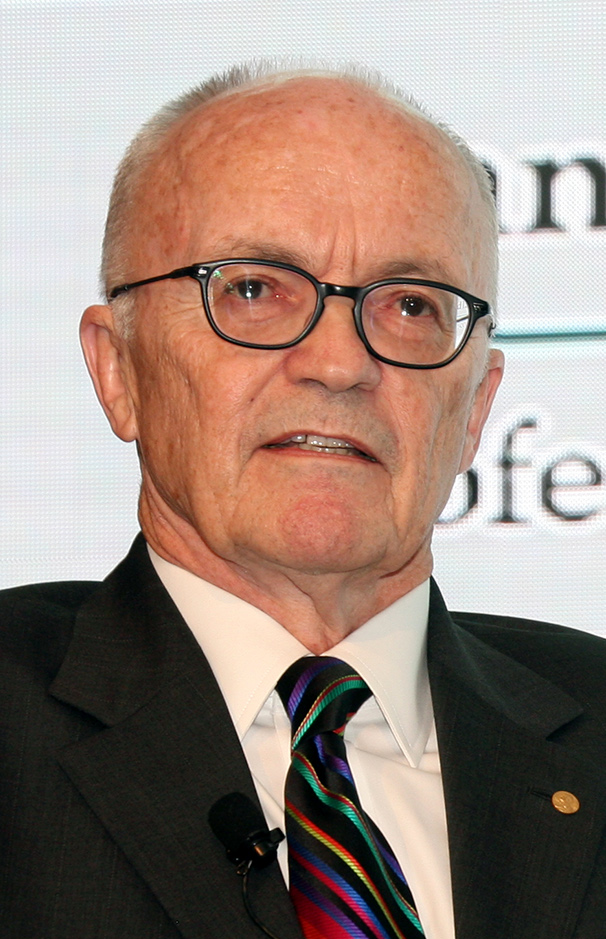
Finn E. Kydland, Nobel Memorial Prize in Economics (2004)

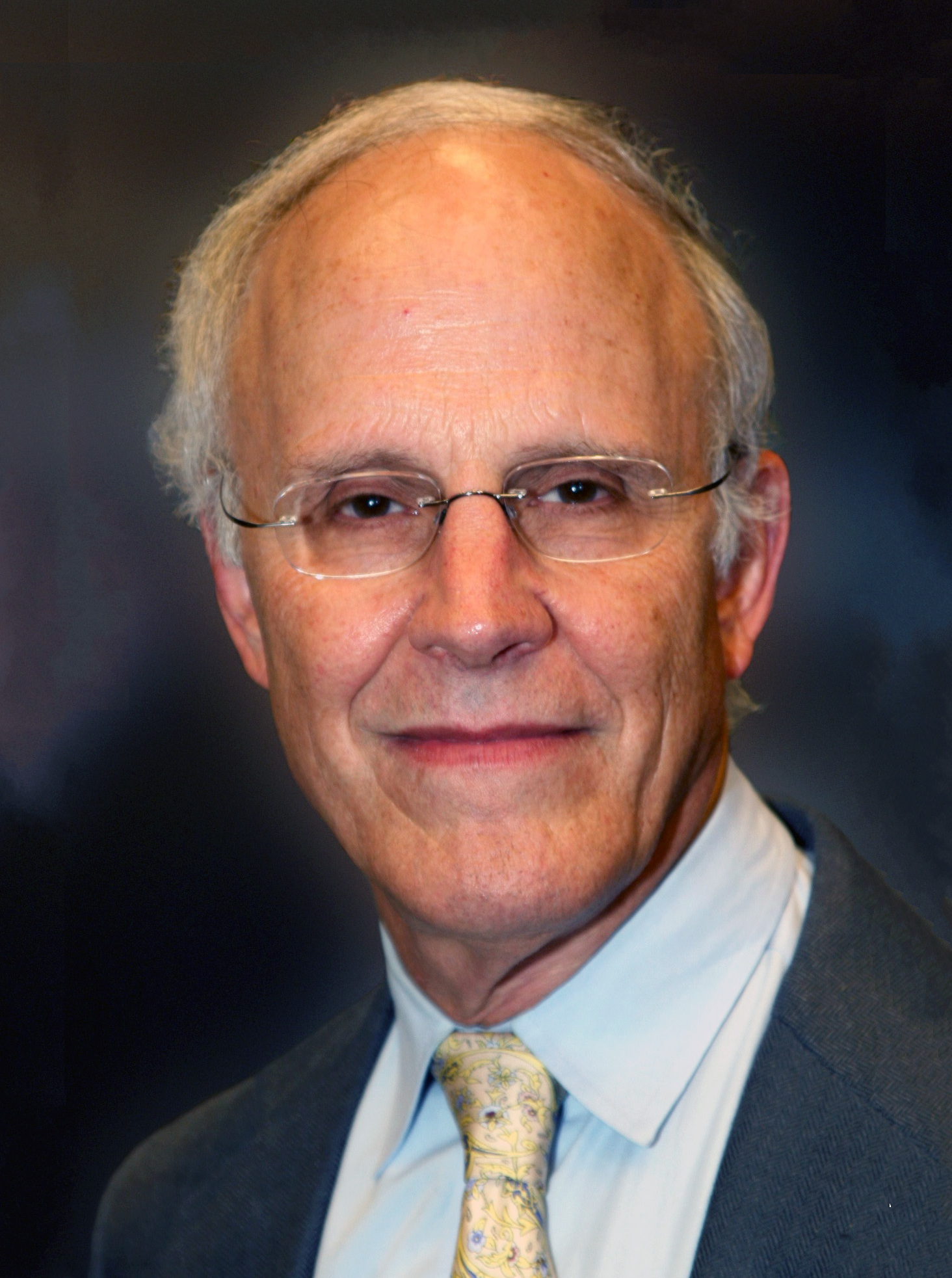
David J. Gross, Nobel Prize in Physics (2004)

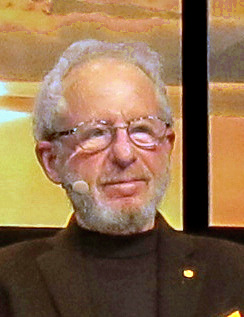
Alan J. Heeger, Nobel Prize in Chemistry (2000)

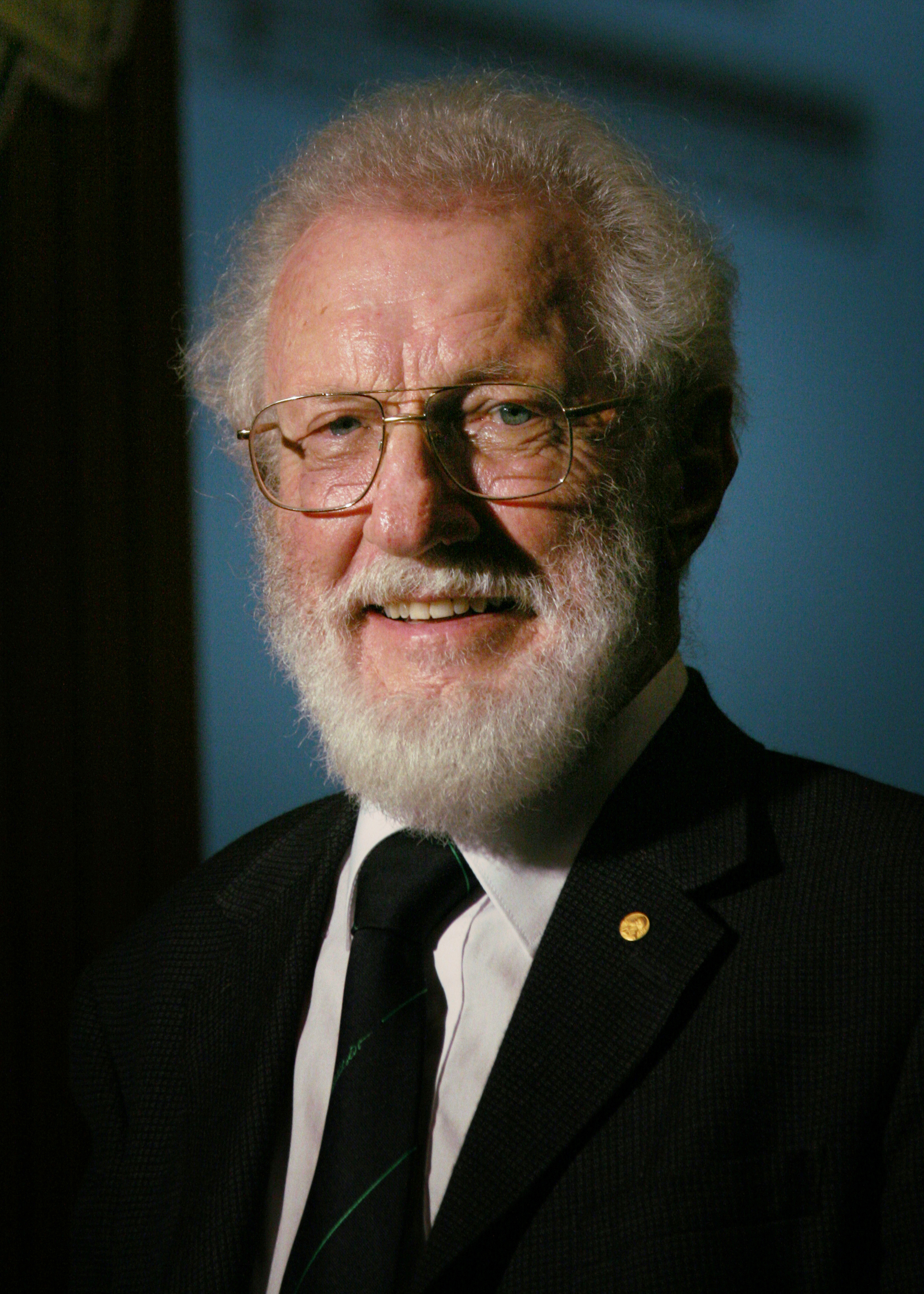
Herbert Kroemer, Nobel Prize in Physics (2000)

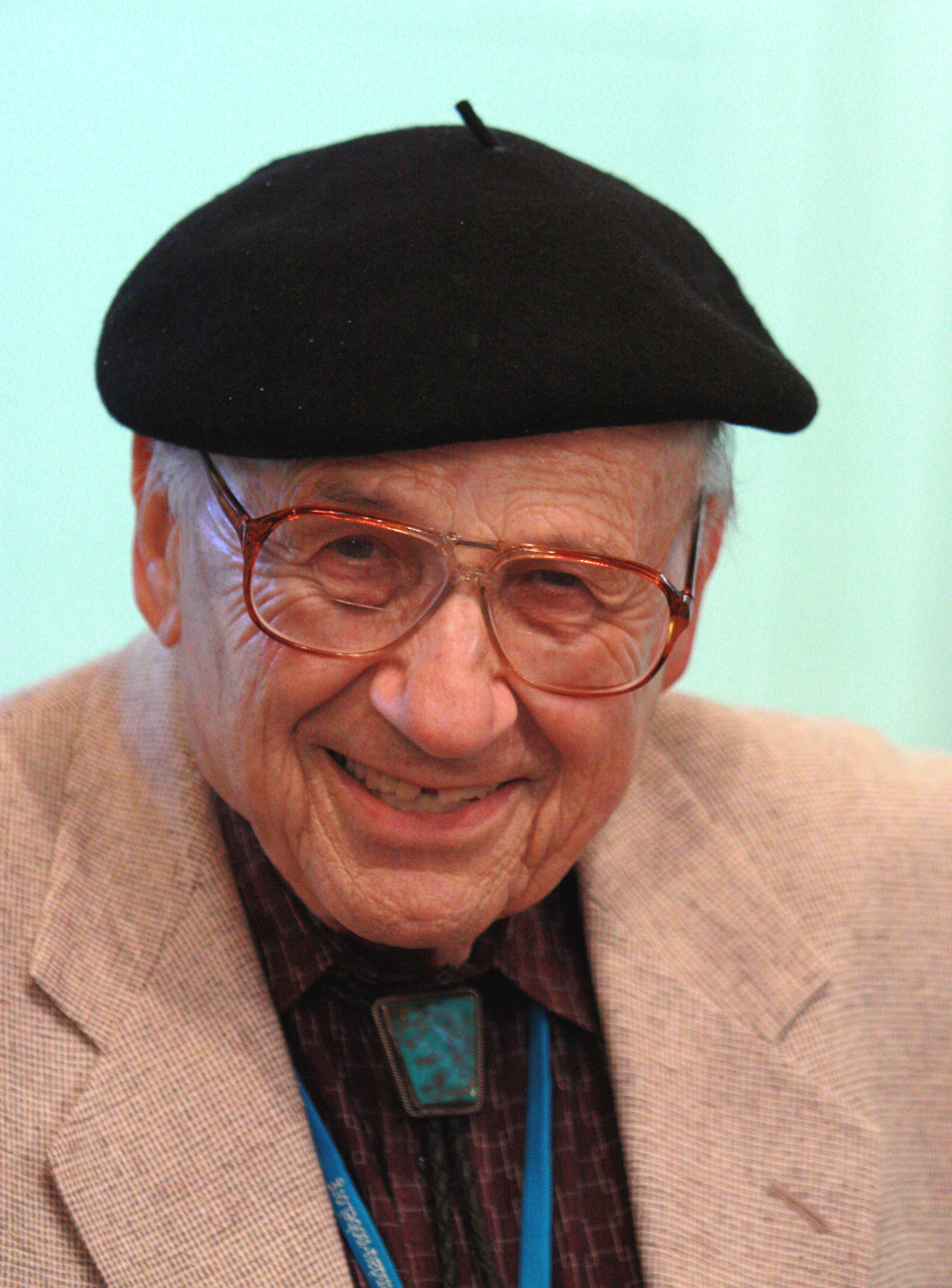
Walter Kohn, Nobel Prize in Chemistry (1998)

=== Notable alumni ===
UC Santa Barbara alumni have become notable in many varied fields, both academic and otherwise. Carol Greider, who won the Nobel Prize in Physiology or Medicine (2009), graduated from the College of Creative Studies with a B.A. in biology in 1983. Robert Ballard, an oceanographer who discovered the RMS Titanic in 1985, graduated from UCSB in 1965 with a degree in chemistry and geology.

Actors who have studied at UCSB include Academy Award winner Michael Douglas, who received a B.A. in drama in 1968 and is honorary president of the UCSB Alumni Association, and Gwyneth Paltrow, who studied anthropology before dropping out to act.

Filmmakers who have studied at UCSB include Academy Award nominee Don Hertzfeldt, who received a B.A. in Film Studies in 1998; Gregg Araki, director of films like Mysterious Skin and The Doom Generation, who got his B.A. from UCSB in 1982; Brad Silberling, director of films like Moonlight Mile and Lemony Snicket's A Series of Unfortunate Events; and Gavin Garrison, who received a B.A. in Global Studies in 2007 and now produces the Emmy-nominated television show Whale Wars; and Forrest Galante, wildlife biologist and star of Extinct or Alive on the Animal Planet Network. Noah Harpster, writer, actor, producer and director, best known for writing A Beautiful Day in the Neighborhood, Transparent, Painkiller and acting in One Mississippi and For All Mankind, who received a B.F.A. in Acting.

Musicians who have attended include Robby Krieger, guitarist in The Doors, singer-songwriter Jack Johnson, singer and guitarist for The Beach Boys, Jeffrey Foskett, and electro-house musician Steve Aoki.

Chairman of the Oracle Corporation Jeffrey O. Henley graduated with a B.A. in economics in 1966, while Knut Vollebæk, former foreign minister of Norway, graduated with a degree in political science in 1973.

Athletes who have studied at UCSB include swimmer and four-time Olympic gold medalist Jason Lezak, NBA player and head coach Brian Shaw, and UCLA basketball coach Cori Close. Television journalist Katy Tur of NBC and MSNBC received a degree in 2005, and Elizabeth Wagmeister of Page Six TV and Variety graduated with a B.A. in communications in 2012.

Notable UC Santa Barbara alumni include:

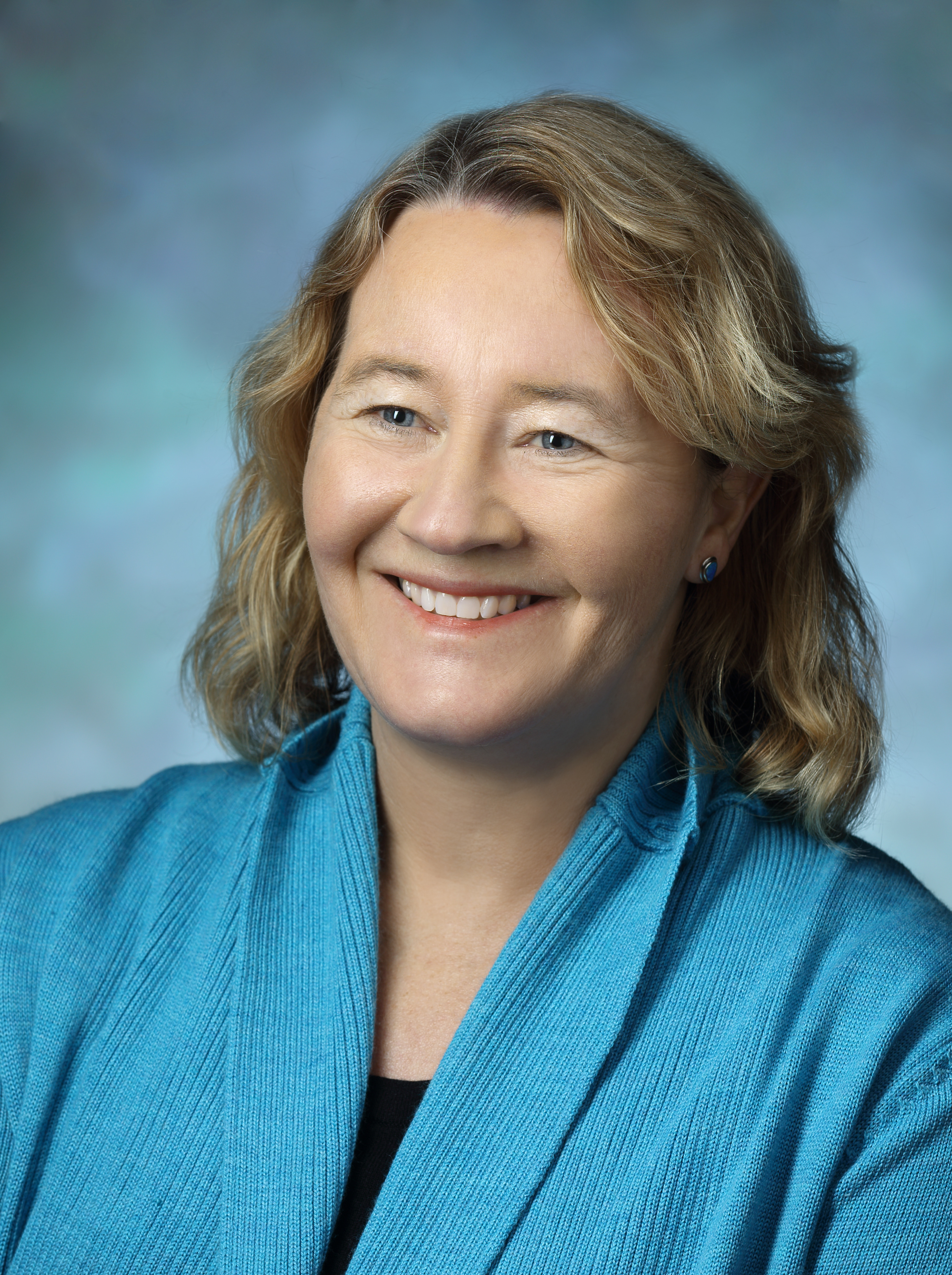
Carol Greider, recipient of the Nobel Prize in Physiology or Medicine (2009)

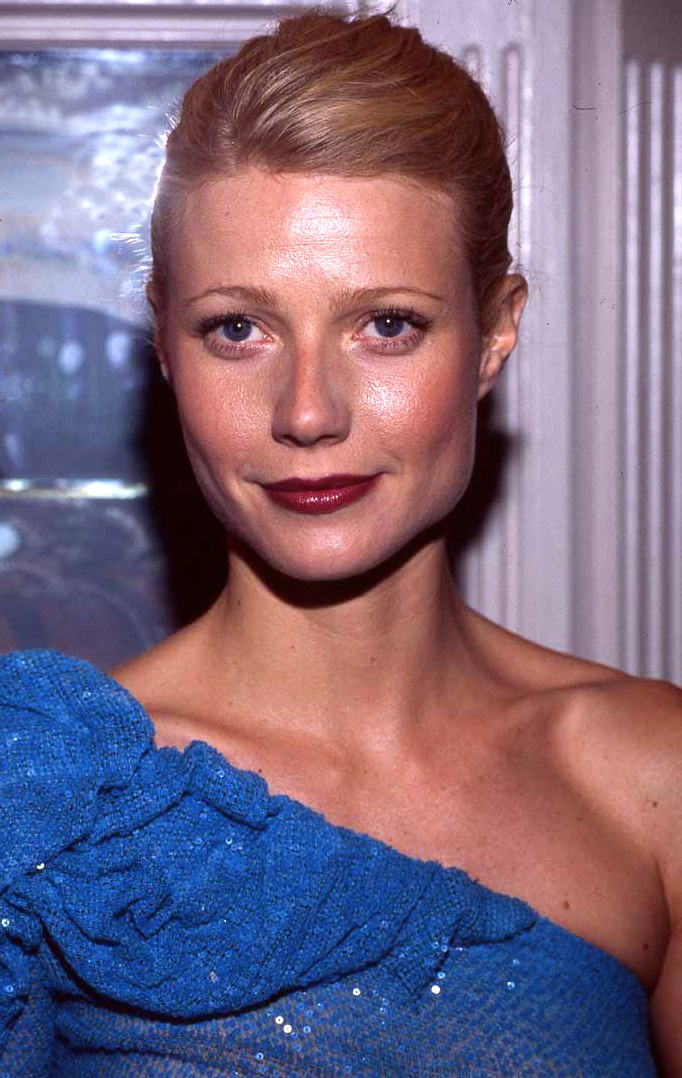
Gwyneth Paltrow, Academy Award-winning actress

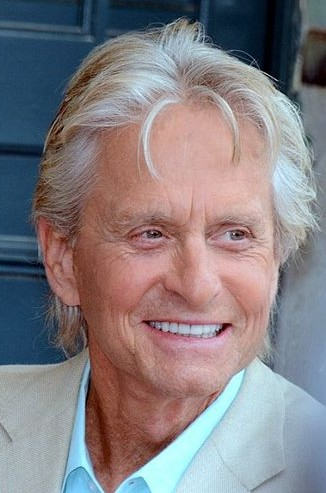
Michael Douglas, Academy Award-winning actor and producer

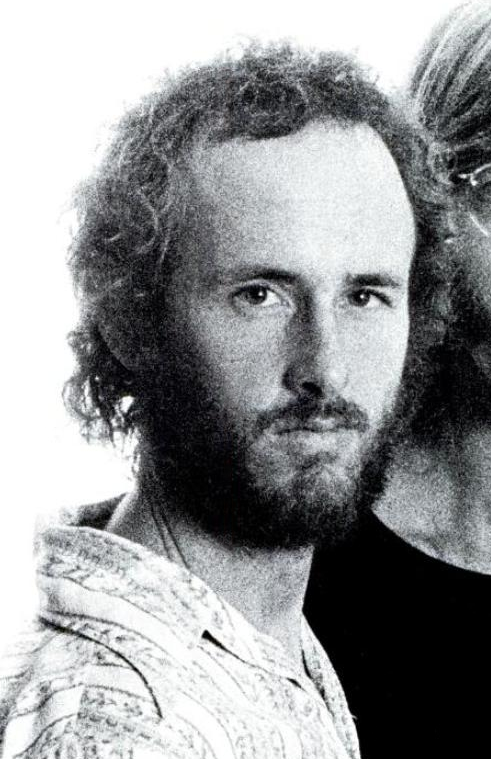
Robby Krieger, rock guitarist and songwriter in The Doors

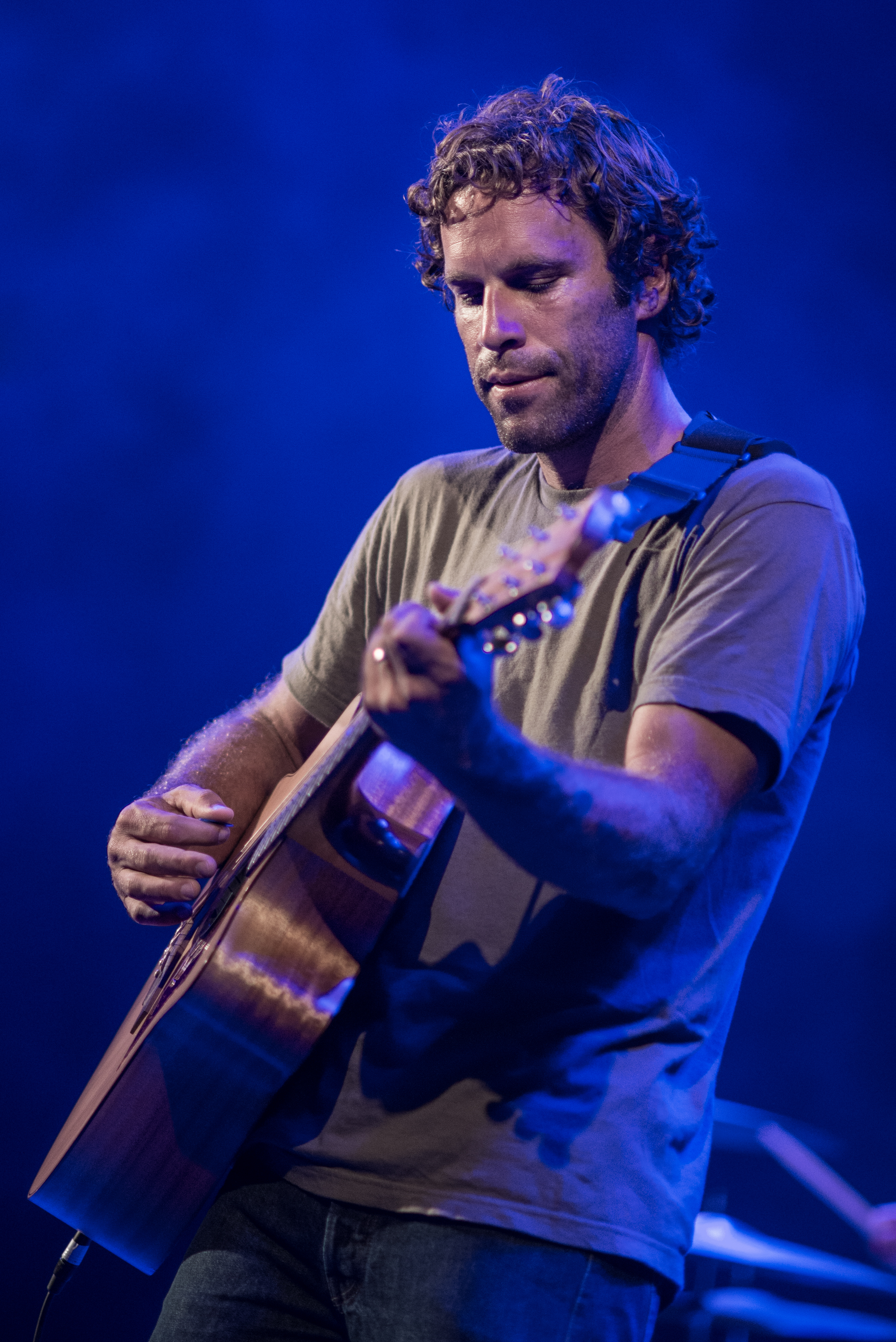
Jack Johnson, singer-songwriter and former professional surfer

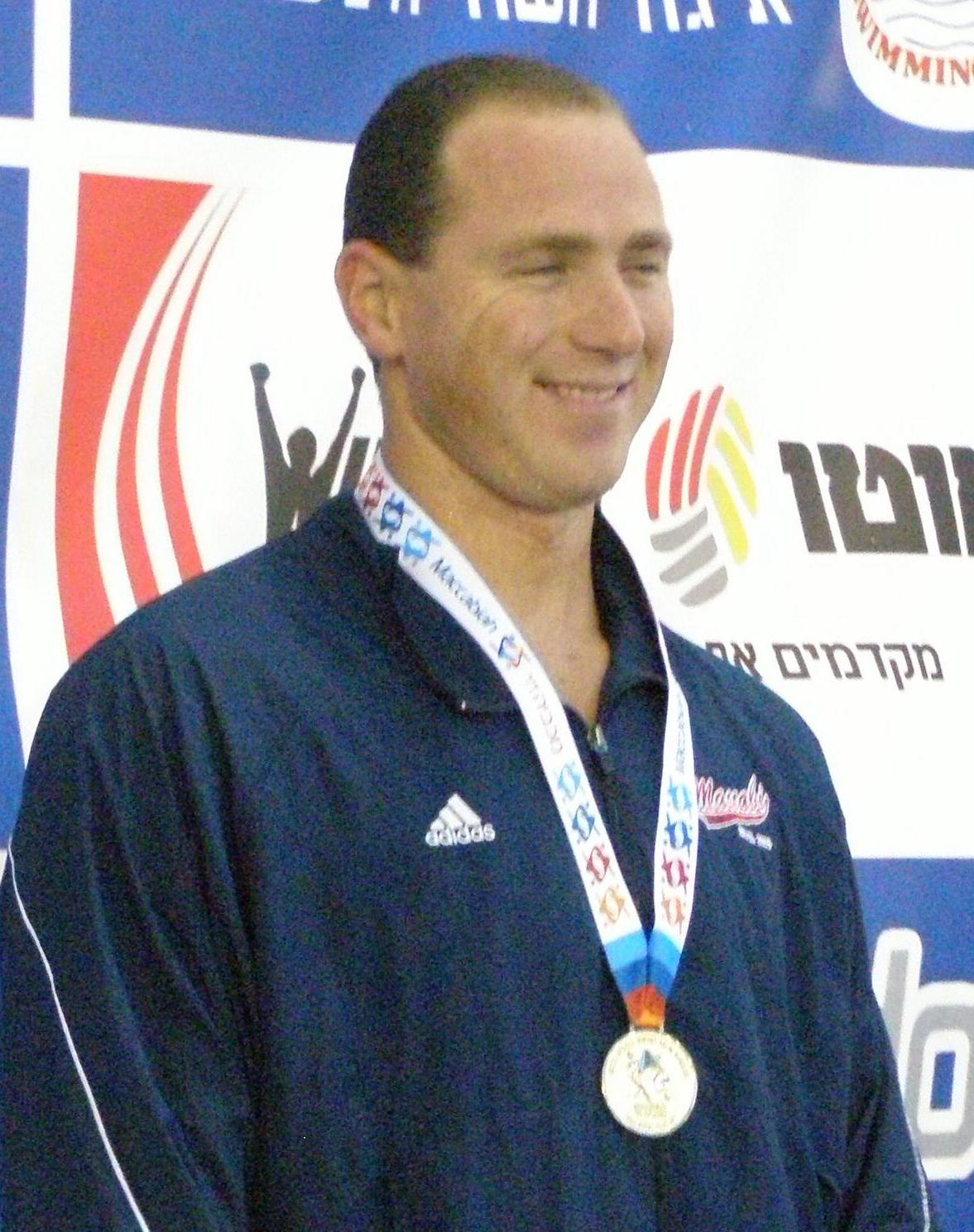
Jason Lezak, swimmer and four-time Olympic gold medalist

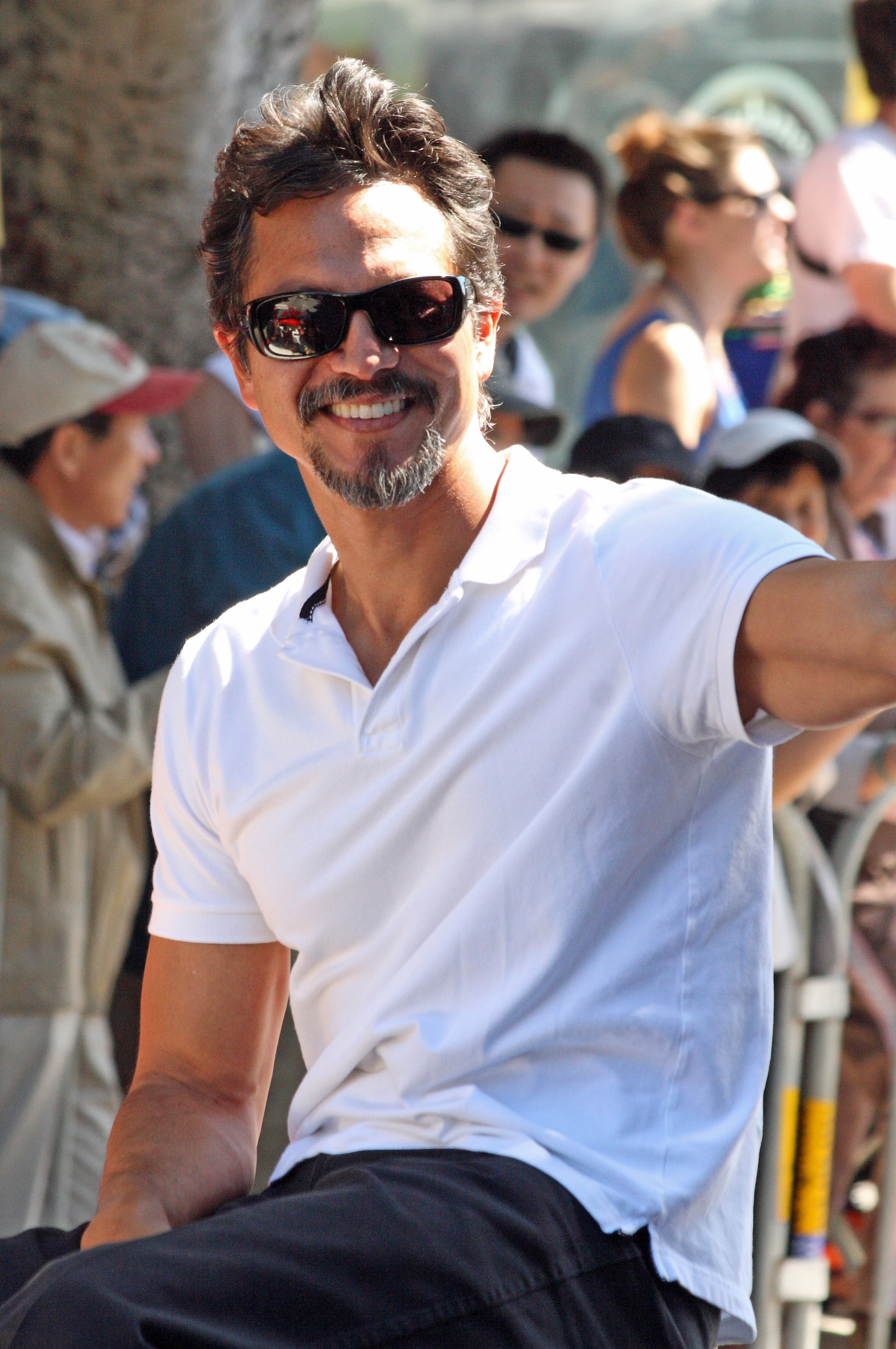
Benjamin Bratt, American actor

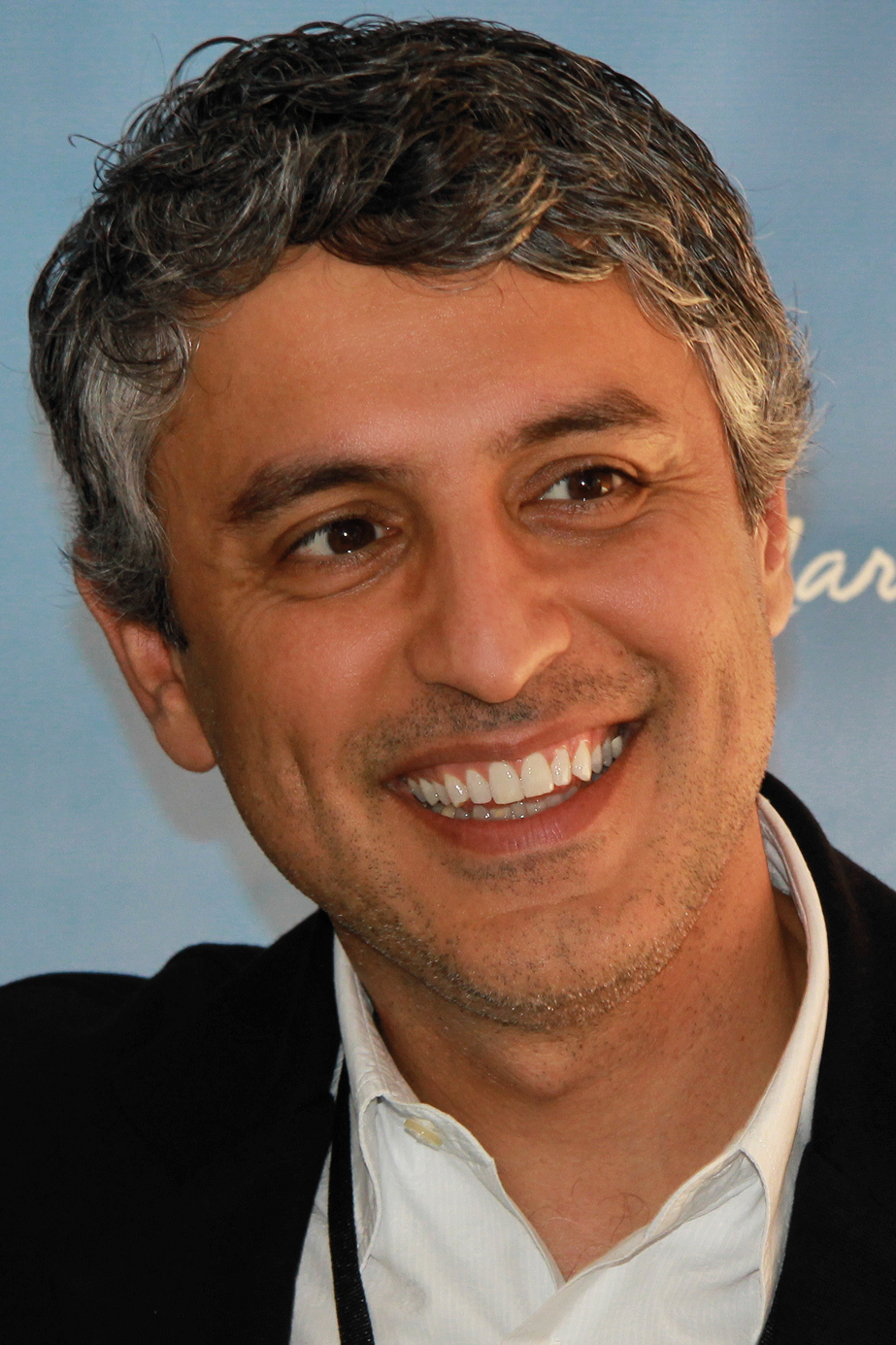
Reza Aslan, Iranian-American author, commentator and religious scholar

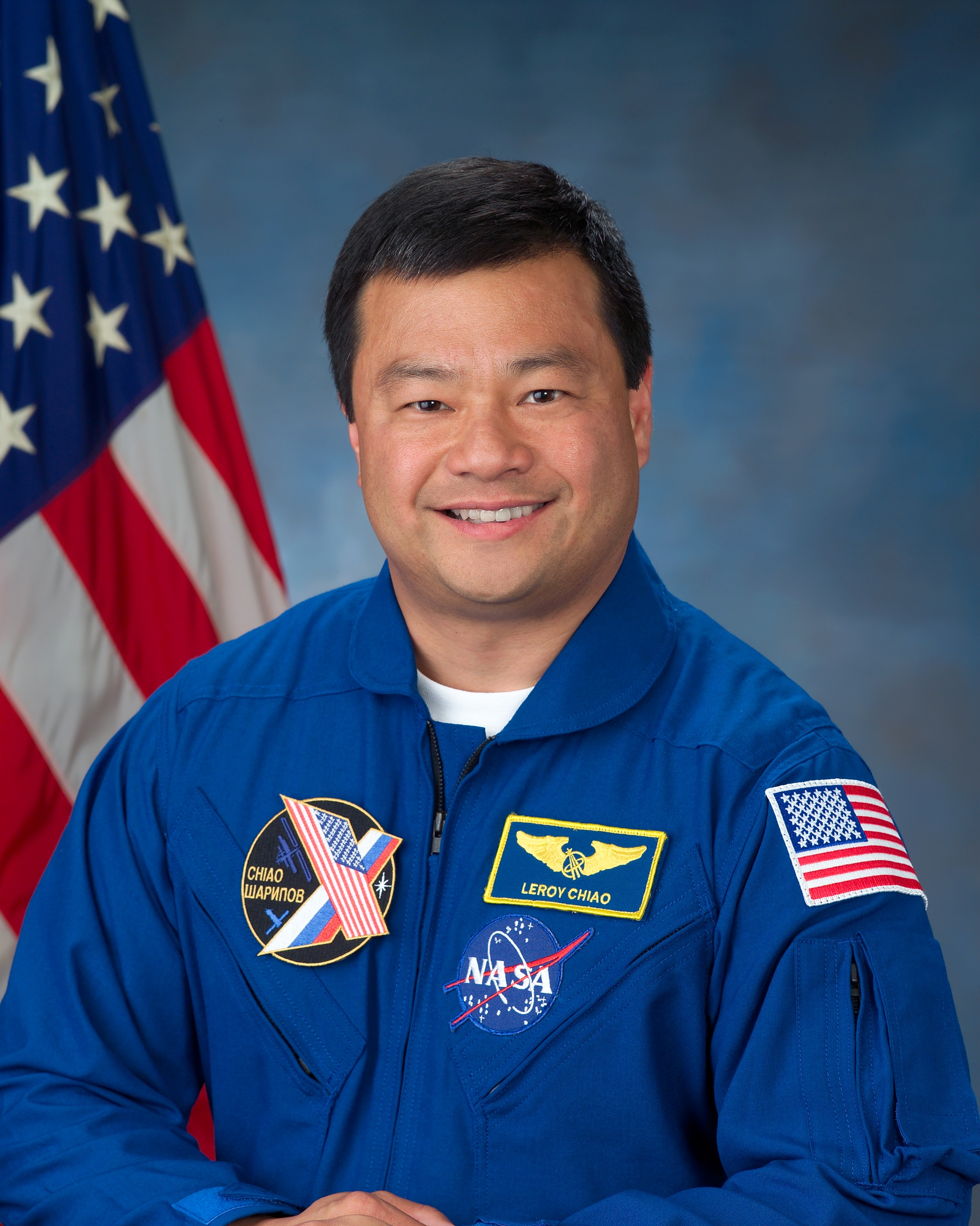
Leroy Chiao, former NASA astronaut, entrepreneur, and motivational speaker

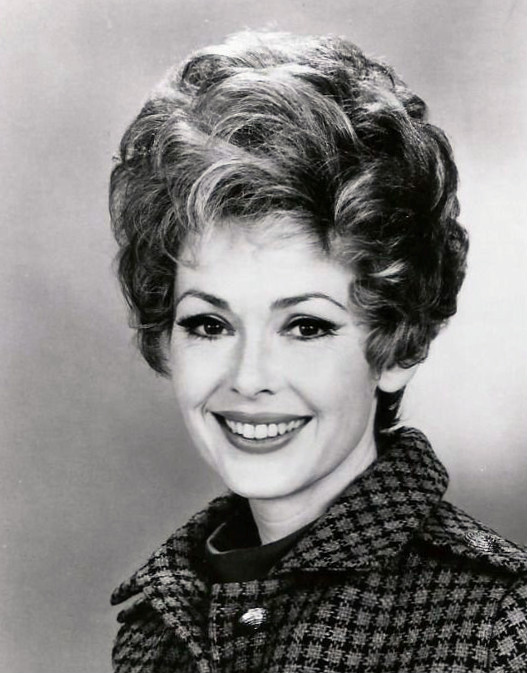
Barbara Rush, Golden Globe Award-winning actress

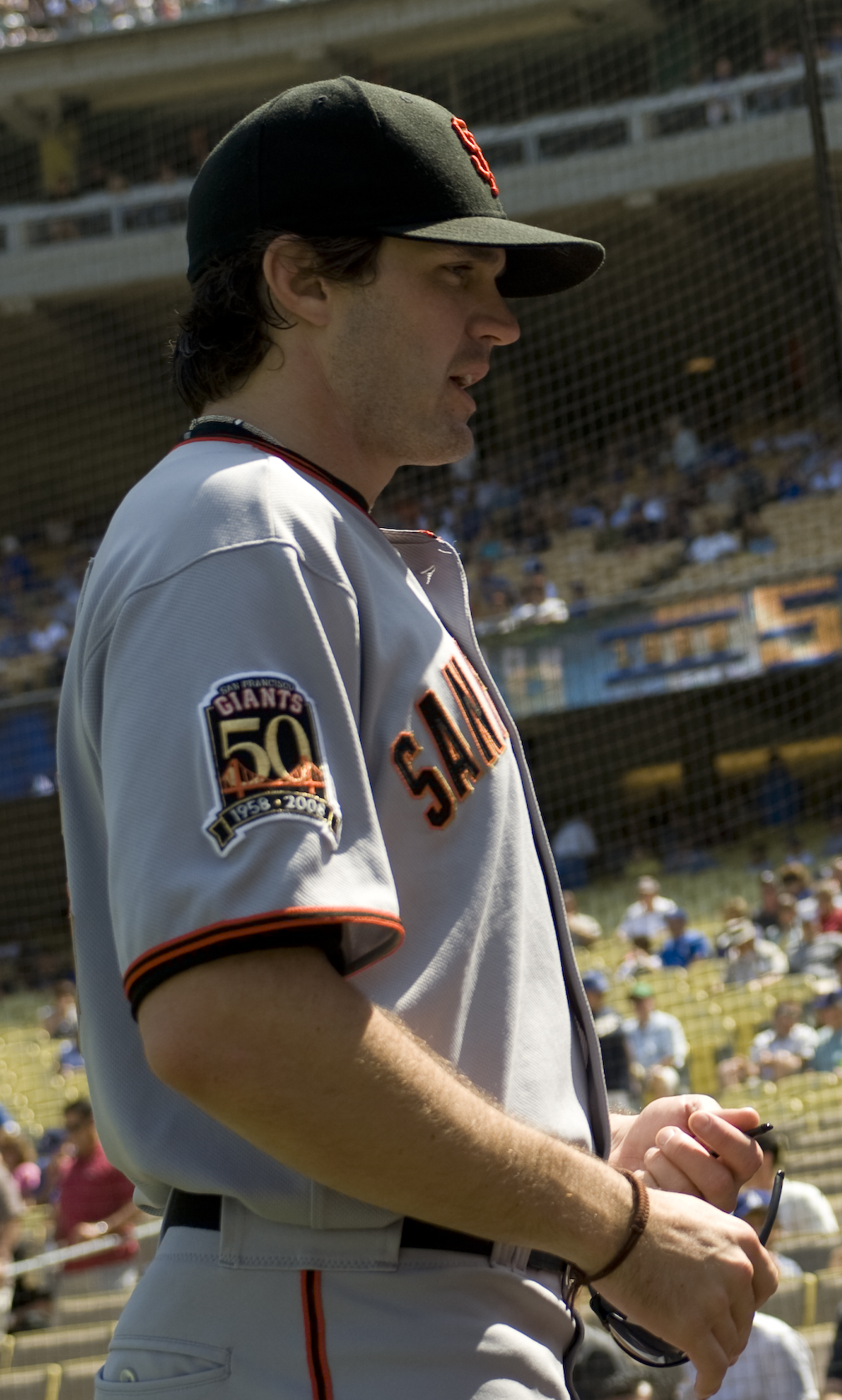
Barry Zito, 3-time MLB All-Star pitcher

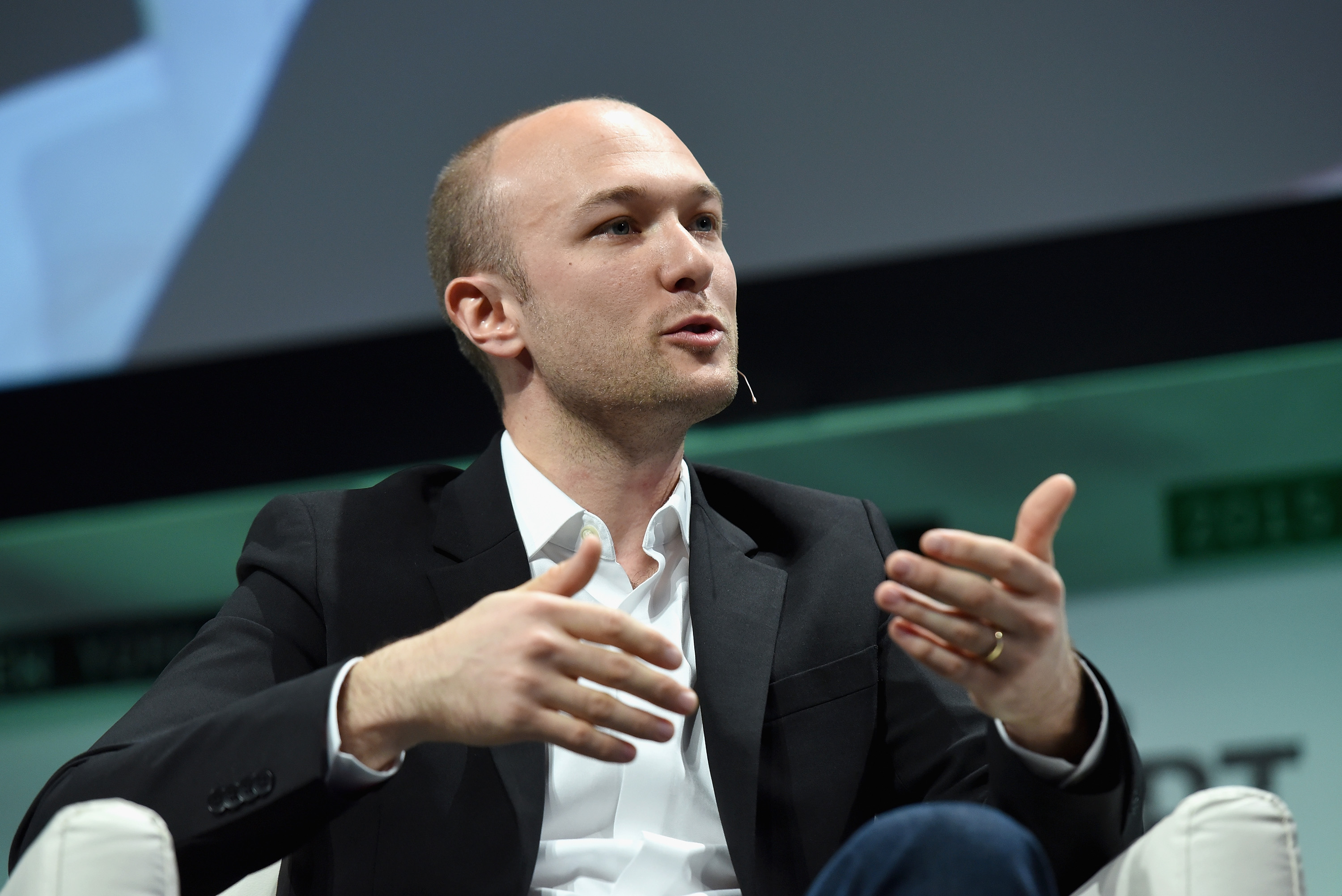
Logan Green, co-founder and chairman of Lyft

== Demographics ==
University of California-Santa Barbara CDP
- Census-designated place
- Location in California University of California-Santa Barbara CDP (the United States)
- Coordinates: 34°25′06″N 119°51′03″W
- Country: United States
- State: California
- County: Santa Barbara

Area
  - Total: 1.415 sq mi (3.66 km^{2})
  - Land: 1.299 sq mi (3.36 km^{2})
  - Water: 0.116 sq mi (0.30 km^{2})
- Elevation: 36 ft (11 m)

Population (2020)
  - Total: 9,710
  - Density: 7,470/sq mi (2,890/km^{2})
- Time zone: UTC-8 (Pacific)
  - Summer (DST): UTC-7 (PDT)
- GNIS feature ID: 2813356

The United States Census Bureau has designated the UC Santa Barbara campus as a separate census-designated place (CDP) for statistical purposes. It first appeared as a CDP in the 2020 United States census with a population of 9,710.

Historical population
Census	Pop.	Note	%±
2020	9,710		—
U.S. Decennial Census; 1850–1870 1880–1890; 1900 1910 1920; 1930 1940 1950; 1960 1970 1980; 1990 2000 2010 2020

=== 2020 census ===
University of California-Santa Barbara CDP, California – Racial and ethnic composition Note: the US Census treats Hispanic/Latino as an ethnic category. This table excludes Latinos from the racial categories and assigns them to a separate category. Hispanics/Latinos may be of any race.
Race / Ethnicity (NH = Non-Hispanic)	Pop 2020	% 2020
White alone (NH)	3,661	37.70%
Black or African American alone (NH)	118	1.22%
Native American or Alaska Native alone (NH)	4	0.04%
Asian alone (NH)	3,656	37.65%
Pacific Islander alone (NH)	4	0.04%
Other Race alone (NH)	71	0.73%
Mixed Race or Multi-Racial (NH)	339	3.49%
Hispanic or Latino (any race)	1,857	19.12%
Total	9,710	100.00%

== See also ==
- List of astronauts educated at the University of California
- 2014 Isla Vista killings
- Latin American Fisheries Fellowship
