= Maria Yang =

American mechanical engineer

- Citizenship: United States
- Education: Massachusetts Institute of Technology (BS); Stanford University (MS, PhD)
- Parent: Henry T. Yang (father)
- Scientific career
- Fields: Mechanical engineering
- Workplaces: California Institute of Technology; University of Southern California; Reactivity Inc; Massachusetts Institute of Technology
- Thesis: Retrieval of informal information from design: A thesaurus based approach (2000)
- Doctoral advisor: Mark Cutkosky
- Website: meche.mit.edu/mcyang

Maria Chiu-Yee Yang is an American mechanical engineer with research fields in engineering design. She is the associate dean of the MIT School of Engineering, and serves as the Kendall Rohsenow Professor at the Massachusetts Institute of Technology (MIT). She is also the director of the MIT D-Lab and associate director of the MIT Morningside Academy for Design.

== Biography ==
=== Early life and education ===
Yang lived in West Lafayette, Indiana, where her father, Taiwanese-American aerospace engineer Henry T. Yang, worked as a professor at Purdue University.

Yang received a Bachelor of Science in mechanical engineering from the Massachusetts Institute of Technology in 1991. She received a Master of Science in mechanical engineering in 1994 and a Doctor of Philosophy in mechanical engineering in 2000, both from Stanford University.

Yang's doctoral research at Stanford University was supported by a NSF Graduate Fellowship. Her doctoral dissertation, Retrieval of informal information from design: A thesaurus based approach, was supervised by Mark Cutkosky.

=== Career ===
Yang completed her postdoctoral research at the California Institute of Technology. She also worked as the director of design at Reactivity Inc, a privately held XML gateway provider based in Redwood City, California. Later, she moved to the University of Southern California to serve as assistant professor of industrial and systems engineering.

Yang returned to her undergraduate alma mater the Massachusetts Institute of Technology in 2007, serving as Robert N. Noyce Career Development Assistant Professor of Mechanical Engineering and Engineering Systems.

=== Awards ===
Yang won a National Science Foundation CAREER Award in 2006. She was elected as an ASME Fellow by the American Society of Mechanical Engineers in 2013. She won the Fred Merryfield Design Award of the American Society for Engineering Education in 2014.
