= Dennis Assanis =

Greek-American mechanical engineer

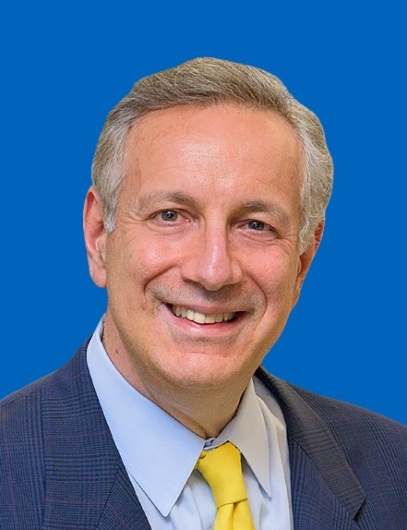
- Official portrait in 2022

6th Chancellor of the University of California, Santa Barbara
- Incumbent
- Assumed office September 1, 2025
- Preceded by: Henry T. Yang; David Marshall (acting)

28th President of the University of Delaware
- In office June 6, 2016 – June 30, 2025
- Preceded by: Patrick T. Harker; Nancy Targett (acting)
- Succeeded by: Laura Carlson

Personal details
- Born: Dionissios Nikolaou Assanis; 1958 or 1959 (age 66–67) Athens, Greece
- Citizenship: United States
- Spouse: Eleni Assanis
- Education: Newcastle University (BS); Massachusetts Institute of Technology (MS, MS, PhD, MS)
- Scientific career
- Fields: Mechanical engineering Ocean engineering
- Workplaces: University of Illinois, Urbana-Champaign; University of Michigan; Stony Brook University; University of Delaware; University of California, Santa Barbara
- Thesis: A Computer Simulation of the Turbocharged Turbo-Compounded Diesel Engine System for Studies of Low Heat Rejection Engine Performance (1986)
- Doctoral advisor: John B. Heywood

Dionissios "Dennis" Nikolaou Assanis (born 1958/1959) is a Greek-American mechanical engineer, currently serving as the 6th chancellor of the University of California, Santa Barbara since September 2025.

He served as the 28th president of the University of Delaware from June 2016 to June 2025 and as provost of the State University of New York at Stony Brook from 2011 to 2016.

== Early life and education ==
Assanis was born and raised in Athens, Greece.

Assanis received a Bachelor of Science degree with a major in marine engineering from Newcastle University in England in 1980. He pursued graduated studies at the Massachusetts Institute of Technology, receiving a Master of Science (M.S.) in naval architecture and marine engineering in 1982, an M.S. in mechanical engineering in 1982, a Ph.D. in power and propulsion in 1985, and an M.S. in management in 1986. Assanis is currently a United States citizen.

== Career ==
=== University of Illinois Urbana-Champaign ===
Assanis began his academic career at the University of Illinois Urbana-Champaign as an assistant professor of mechanical engineering in September 1985. He was promoted to associate professor of mechanical engineering in August 1990.

=== University of Michigan ===
Assanis joined the University of Michigan College of Engineering in September 1994 as a full professor of mechanical engineering, a role he held until his departure in September 2011. He was also a professor of applied physics from 2003 to 2011. He chaired the Department of Mechanical Engineering from January 2002 to August 2007.

Assanis held the title of the Arthur F. Thurnau Professor from 1999 to 2011 and the title of the Jon R. and Beverly S. Holt Professor of Engineering from 2000 to 2011. He took a Regents-approved sabbatical leave from September 1, 2007, to May 31, 2008, citing the reason to write a textbook on internal combustion engines.

=== Stony Brook University ===
Assanis served as provost and senior vice president of academic affairs at the State University of New York at Stony Brook from October 1, 2011, to 2016. He concurrently served as the university's vice president for Brookhaven National Laboratory affairs through his provostship from 2011 to 2016.

=== University of Delaware ===
Assanis served as the 28th president of the University of Delaware from June 6, 2016, to June 30, 2025. On April 9, 2021, the Board of Trustees extended Assanis' contract, which was set to expire in June 2021, through June 2026, with a total annual compensation of more than US$1.5 million, which made him the third-highest-paid president of a public university in 2023.

On May 5, 2025, he announced that he would step down from the presidency on June 30. On May 13, the Board of Trustees voted unanimously to award him an honorary doctorate and the title of president emeritus. On May 24, 2025, he was officially awarded an Honorary Doctor of Humane Letters degree from the University of Delaware.

=== UC Santa Barbara ===
On July 17, 2025, the Regents of the University of California announced the appointment of Dennis Assanis as the 6th chancellor of the University of California, Santa Barbara, effective September 1, 2025, with an annual base salary of US$880,000. In November 2025, the university spent US$7.8 million to purchase a new off-campus residence for the new chancellor.

== Social engagement ==
In 2008, Assanis was elected to the National Academy of Engineering for his "scientific contributions to improving fuel economy and reducing emissions of internal combustion engines, and for promoting automotive engineering education".

On May 19, 2022, United States president Joe Biden appointed Assanis to the President's Council of Advisors on Science and Technology.

== Personal life ==
Dennis Assanis's wife is Eleni Assanis.
