= Richard H. Gallagher =

American academic administrator (1927–1997)

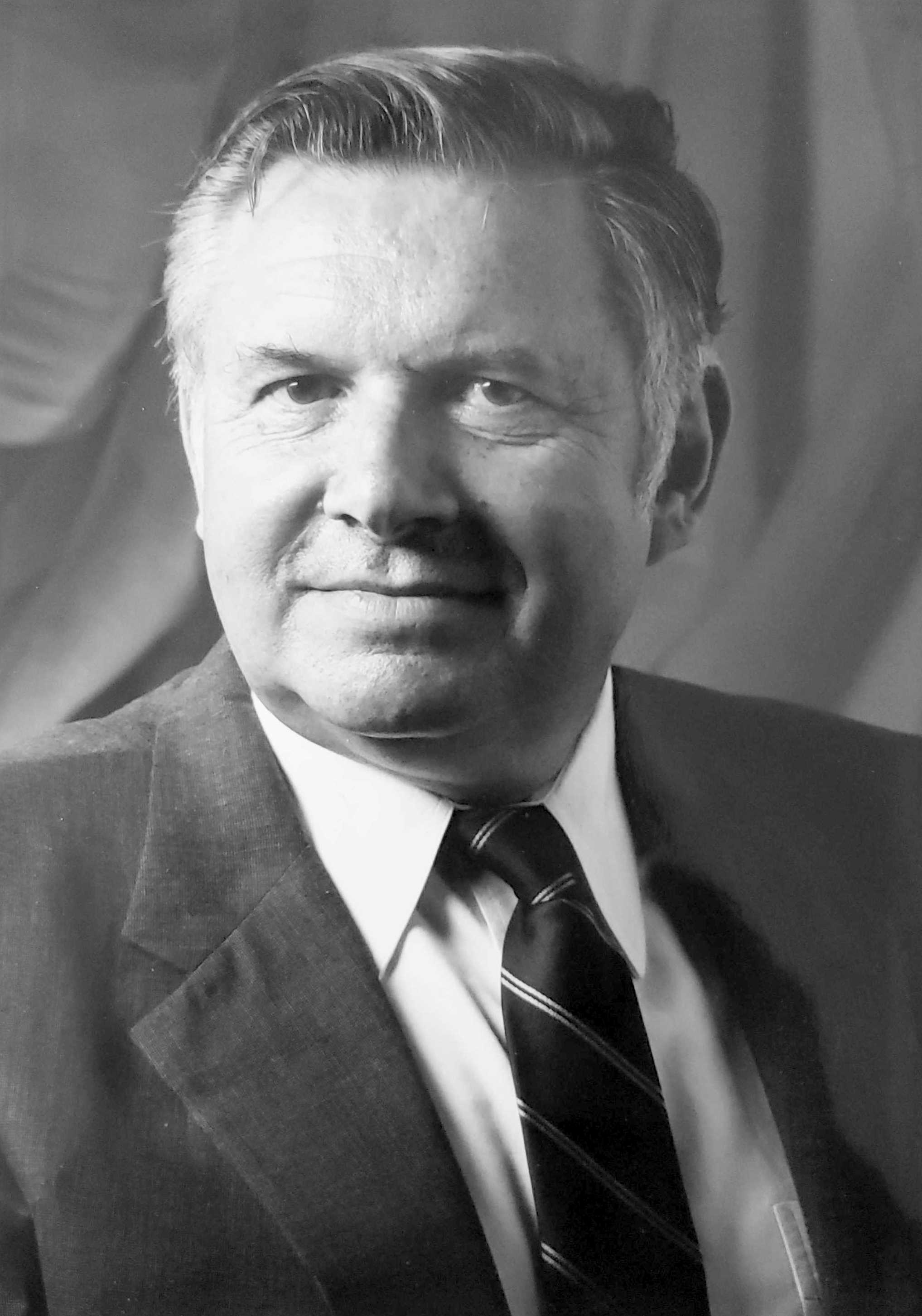
- Born: November 17, 1927; New York City, U.S.
- Died: September 30, 1997 (aged 69); Tucson, Arizona, U.S.
- Education: New York University (BS, MS); University of Buffalo (PhD)
- Known for: Contributions to finite element theory
- Awards: National Academy of Engineering (1983); Worcester Reed Warner Medal (1985); Benjamin Garver Lamme Award (1990); Structures, Structural Dynamics and Materials Award (1990); ASME Medal (1993); John Von Neumann Medal (1995)
- Scientific career
- Fields: Civil engineering Aerospace engineering
- Doctoral students: Henry T. Yang; Chang San-cheng

Richard Hugo Gallagher (November 17, 1927 – September 30, 1997) was an American civil and aerospace engineer. He served as provost of the Worcester Polytechnic Institute from 1984 to 1988 and then as the 14th president of Clarkson University from 1988 to 1995.

Throughout his academic career, Gallagher supervised many doctoral students, including Henry T. Yang (the longest-serving chancellor at the University of California) and Chang San-cheng (premier of Taiwan).

== Early life and education ==
Gallagher was born in Manhattan, New York City in 1927. After serving in the Navy during World War II, he studied civil engineering at New York University, where he received bachelor's and master's degrees.

== Career ==
After graduating from New York University, he worked for the Federal Aviation Administration and the Texas Company, before joining Bell Aerosystems in the Buffalo, New York area. There, he worked in aerospace structural analysis and eventually became the firm's assistant chief engineer.

Gallagher was a leader in developing methods for finite-element analysis that utilized the capabilities of computers to design complex structures. With his guidance, engineers and researchers at Bell expanded knowledge of "inelastic analysis, design optimization, composite materials analysis, linear fracture applications, thermal analysis methods, solid- and shell-element formulations, and the super-element substructuring technique."

During his time at Bell, Gallagher taught and studied for his doctorate at the State University of New York at Buffalo. He received the university's first engineering PhD degree in 1966.

Once he received his doctorate, Gallagher soon became a full professor of civil engineering at Cornell University. At Cornell, he supervised doctoral students, including Henry T. Yang and Chang San-cheng.

In 1978, he became dean of the College of Engineering at the University of Arizona, where he would again be a professor in residence after retiring from academic administration in 1995. In 1983, he was elected to the National Academy of Engineering. He joined the Worcester Polytechnic Institute in Massachusetts as the university's provost in 1984 and served until 1988.

From 1988 to 1995, Gallagher served as the 14th president of Clarkson University, where he helped raise academic standards, found new engineering programs, construct new buildings, and double the university's endowment.

== Publications ==
His first book, A Correlation Study of Matrix Methods of Structural Analysis was published in 1964.

In 1973, he published Optimum Structural Design.

Gallagher was the author of Finite Element Analysis—Fundamentals, published in 1975. The book was translated into seven languages and sold 40,000 copies.

In 1979, he published Matrix Structural Analysis, with W. McGuire.

In total, Gallagher published 20 books and 120 papers.

He also founded the International Journal of Numerical Methods in Engineering, which he edited for 27 years.

== Awards and honors ==
- National Academy of Engineering (Elected in 1983).
- ASME Medal - American Society of Mechanical Engineers (1993).
- Worcester Reed Warner Medal - American Society of Mechanical Engineers (ASME) (1985).
- John Von Neumann Medal - United States Association for Computational Mechanics (1995).
- Structures, Structural Dynamics and Materials Award - American Institute of Aeronautics and Astronautics (AIAA) (1990).
- Benjamin Garver Lamme Award - American Society of Engineering Education (ASEE) (1990).
- Fellow Member - American Society for Engineering Education (ASEE) (1993).
- American Society for Engineering Education (ASEE) Hall of Fame - American Society for Engineering Education (ASEE) (Centennial Inductee 1993).
- Honorary Doctorates: Clarkson University (1995), Technical University of Vienna (1987), Shanghai University of Technology (1992).
- Clifford C. Furnas Memorial Award, State University of New York-Buffalo (1991).
- Distinguished Member of the American Society of Civil Engineers (ASCE) (1995)
- Honorary Fellow, Swansea University (1987).
- Fulbright Fellow: Australia (1973).

The Gallagher Young Investigator Award from the U.S. Association for Computational Mechanics is awarded biannually to recognize outstanding accomplishments, particularly outstanding published papers, by researchers of 40 years or younger.

== Personal life ==
Gallagher was married to the former Terese Doyle. He was survived by five children, all of whom were engineers: Mary Lee Rodin, Richard S. Gallagher, William J. Gallagher, Dennis M. Gallagher and John B. Gallagher.

Gallagher died of cancer at Northwest Hospital in Tucson, Arizona in 1997.
