= UC Santa Barbara College of Engineering =

Engineering school at the University of California, Santa Barbara

Coordinates: 34.413868°N 119.841214°W

- Type: Public engineering school
- Established: 1966
- Parent institution: University of California, Santa Barbara
- Dean: Umesh Mishra
- Location: Santa Barbara, California, U.S.
- Website: engineering.ucsb.edu

The UC Santa Barbara College of Engineering (CoE; formally Robert Mehrabian College of Engineering) is the engineering school and one of the three undergraduate colleges at the University of California, Santa Barbara (UCSB). The College offers a mid-sized, interdisciplinary environment where innovation drives the development of both fundamental science and applied technology solutions.

As of Fall 2023, the College of Engineering had 162 faculty members, approximately 1,823 undergraduate students, and 733 graduate students.

== Departments and programs ==
The College of Engineering comprises the following departments:

- Chemical Engineering (established in 1965)
- Computer Science (established in 1979)
- Electrical and Computer Engineering (established in 1962)
- Materials (established in 1987)
- Mechanical Engineering (established in 1964)
- Technology Management (established in 2022)

The college is connected to the UCSB campus through innovative multi-disciplinary/outreach academic programs:

- Biological Engineering Program (BioE)
- Computational Science and Engineering Program (CSE)
- Media Arts and Technology Program (MAT)

== Research units ==
UCSB Engineering is home to the nation's first NSF-funded Quantum Foundry, a center dedicated to developing materials for quantum information-based technologies. The College operates as the West Coast hub of the American Photonics Manufacturing Institute and is a key participant in the federal Next Generation Power Electronics Institute. Notably, UCSB's Materials Research Laboratory is regarded as one of the top five materials research facilities in the world. Much of this work is conducted in collaboration with UCSB's interdisciplinary research centers and institutes, which include:

- American Institute for Manufacturing Integrated Photonics (AIM Photonics) in collaboration with SUNY Polytechnic Institute.
- California NanoSystems Institute
- Center for Bio-Image Informatics
- Center for Control, Dynamical-Systems, and Computation
- Center for Information Technology and Society
- Center for Nanotechnology in Society
- Center for Stem Cell Biology and Engineering
- Complex Fluid Design Consortium
- Dow Materials Institute
- Institute for Collaborative Biotechnologies
- Institute for Multiscale Materials Studies
- Institute for Energy Efficiency
- Interdisciplinary Center for Wide Band-Gap Semiconductors
- Materials Research Laboratory
- Mitsubishi Chemical Center for Advanced Materials
- National Nanofabrication Infrastructure Network
- Optoelectronics Research Group
- Solid State Lighting and Energy Electronics Center
- UCSB Nanofabrication Research Center

== Academics ==
=== Undergraduate programs ===
The college offers the B.S. degree in chemical engineering, computer engineering, computer science, electrical engineering, and mechanical engineering. The B.S. programs in chemical engineering, electrical engineering, and mechanical engineering are accredited by the Engineering Accreditation Commission of Accreditation Board for Engineering and Technology (ABET). The computer science B.S. program is accredited by the Computing Accreditation Commission of ABET. Jointly with the Department of Computer Science and the Department of Electrical and Computer Engineering, the college offers an undergraduate degree in computer engineering. The curriculum for the undergraduate programs is designed to be completed in four years.

The UC Santa Barbara College of Engineering maintains a highly selective admissions process. As of 2024, the College reported an overall acceptance rate of approximately 9%. Acceptance rates vary among specific programs:

- Computer Engineering: 7% of applicants admitted
- Electrical Engineering: 9% of applicants admitted
- Computer Science: Approximately 5% acceptance rate

=== Graduate programs ===
The college offers M.S. and Ph.D. degrees in chemical engineering, computer science, electrical & computer engineering, materials science, and mechanical engineering. It also offers graduate programs in technology management, bioengineering, biomolecular science & engineering, and media arts & technology.

== Faculty ==
The college has 150 faculty members, most of whom are involved in interdisciplinary research and academic programs. Twenty-nine faculty members are in the National Academy of Engineering and nine are elected to the National Academy of Sciences. Three faculty members have won the Nobel Prize. Alan J. Heeger, Professor of Physics and of Materials, won the 2000 Nobel Prize in Chemistry "for the discovery and development of conductive polymers", Herbert Kroemer, Professor of Electrical and Computer Engineering and of Materials, won the 2000 Nobel Prize in Physics "for developing semiconductor heterostructures used in high-speed and opto-electronics". In 2006 Shuji Nakamura, a professor of Materials and Computer Engineering, won the Millennium Technology Prize for developing blue, green, and white LEDs and the blue laser diode as well as receiving a 2014 Nobel Prize in Physics for his contribution to the invention of blue light-emitting diodes. In 2015, Professor Arthur Gossard was awarded the National Medal of Technology and Innovation by the Obama Administration.

On June 12, 2025, the UC Santa Barbara College of Engineering was renamed the Robert Mehrabian College of Engineering after Robert Mehrabian, an Armenian-American materials scientist who served as the fourth engineering dean from 1983 to 1990 at the university.

== Publications ==
Convergence is the magazine of Engineering and the Sciences at UC Santa Barbara. Sponsored by the College of Engineering and the Division of Mathematical, Life, and Physical Sciences in the College of Letters and Science, Convergence was begun in early 2005 as a three-times-a-year print publication, with the goal of bringing stories of interest from engineering and the sciences to the desks and coffee tables of a wide range of alumni, friends, partners, funding agencies, corporations, donors and potential supporters. This publication is printed annually.

== Rankings ==
According to the Leiden Ranking, engineering and physical sciences at UCSB is ranked #1 among public universities for top 10% research citation impact. According to the National Research Council rankings, the UCSB engineering graduate research program in Materials was ranked #1 and Chemical Engineering ranked #5 in the nation among public universities.

== See also ==
- University of California, Santa Barbara
- Engineering colleges in California
