= List of chancellors of the State University of New York =

The following is a list of chief executives of the State University of New York.

== List ==
No.	Image	Executive	From	To	Ref.
Presidents (1949–1967)
1		Alvin C. Eurich	January 1, 1949	August 31, 1951	
acting		Charles Garside	September 1, 1951	March 31, 1952	
2		William S. Carlson	April 1, 1952	September, 1958	
3		Thomas H. Hamilton	August 1, 1959	December 31, 1962	
acting		J. Lawrence Murray	January 1, 1963	August 31, 1964	
4		Samuel B. Gould	September 1, 1964	January 11, 1967	
Chancellors (1967–present)
4		Samuel B. Gould	January 12, 1967	August 30, 1970	
5		Ernest L. Boyer	September 1, 1970	March 31, 1977	
acting		James F. Kelly	April 1, 1977	January 24, 1978	
6		Clifton R. Wharton, Jr.	January 25, 1978	January 31, 1987	
acting		Jerome B. Komisar	February 1, 1987	July 31, 1988	
7		D. Bruce Johnstone	August 1, 1988	February 28, 1994	
interim		Joseph C. Burke	March 1, 1994	November 30, 1994	
8		Thomas A. Bartlett	December 1, 1994	June 30, 1996	
interim		John W. Ryan	July 1, 1996	April 20, 1997	
9		John W. Ryan	April 21, 1997	December 31, 1999	
10		Robert L. King	January 1, 2000	May 31, 2005	
acting		John R. Ryan	June 1, 2005	December 19, 2005	
11		John R. Ryan	December 20, 2005	May 31, 2007	
interim		John B. Clark	June 1, 2007	December 31, 2008	
interim		John J. O'Connor	January 1, 2009	May 31, 2009	
12		Nancy L. Zimpher	June 1, 2009	September 4, 2017	
13		Kristina M. Johnson	September 5, 2017	August 31, 2020	
14		Jim Malatras	August 31, 2020	January 14, 2022	
interim		Deborah F. Stanley	January 15, 2022	January 9, 2023	
15		John King Jr.	January 9, 2023	incumbent	
