= F.C. Richardson =

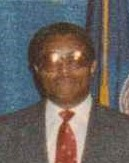
- Richardson, Buffalo, New York, 1990

Chancellor, Indiana University Southeast
- In office 1996–2002
- Preceded by: Leon Rand
- Succeeded by: Barbara Bichelmeyer

President, Buffalo State College
- In office July 1, 1989 – January 1, 1996
- Preceded by: D. Bruce Johnstone
- Succeeded by: Muriel A. Howard

Personal details
- Born: 1936 or 1937 (age 89–90)
- Spouse: Bernice
- Education: Rust College, Clark Atlanta University, University of California, Santa Barbara
- Profession: Academic administration

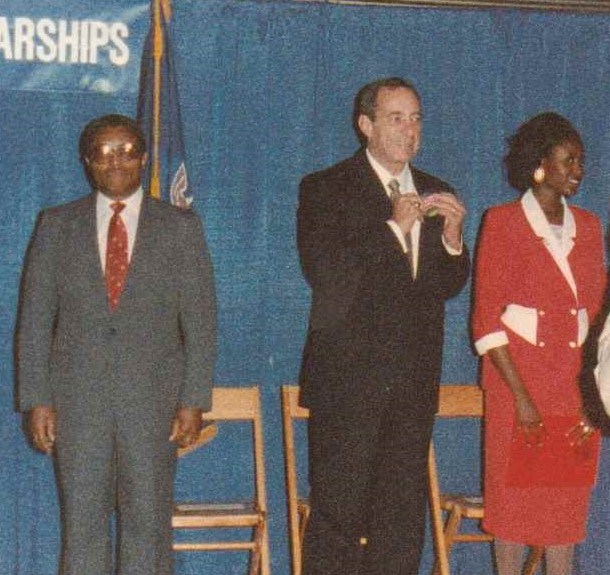
Buffalo State College President FC Richardson with NY Governor Mario Cuomo and Guest, Buffalo, New York, October 1990

F.C. Richardson (born 1937) served as a president of Buffalo State College, a higher education institution that is part of the State University of New York (SUNY) system, from July 1, 1989, to January 1, 1996; and, following that, as chancellor of Indiana University Southeast from 1996 to 2002. Richardson was the first college president of African American heritage at Buffalo State.

== Background ==
Richardson grew up in Tennessee. He earned his baccalaureate degree from Rust College; his master's degree from Atlanta University, now known as Clark Atlanta University; and his PhD from the University of California at Santa Barbara.

Prior to becoming the leader of two higher educational institutions, Richardson was vice president for academic affairs at both Minnesota State University Moorhead and Jackson State University.

== Presidency of Buffalo State College ==
=== Accomplishments ===
While Richardson was president at Buffalo State College, several new developments were achieved. Created were the positions of provost and vice president for institutional advancement at the college. In 1991, the college's Sports Arena opened. A new mission statement was developed for the college, as well as a strategic plan encompassing five years, leading the college into the new millennium.

Richardson focused on creating and implementing new student programs while at Buffalo State. Some of those programs included the Freshman Year Experience, a variety of programs that were designed to introduce new students to college study and which were recognized with national awards; the implementation of a master's degree program that led to a multidisciplinary degree in environmental studies of the Great Lakes; and the college's participation in Project Connect, an innovative communications network that connected the college with classrooms in area high schools.

=== Issues surrounding resignation ===
Prior to and upon Richardson's resignation as president of the college, news articles in The Buffalo News suggested that Richardson was unable to "navigate" the internal political environment of the college, and that communication between faculty was lacking, while he "often did well in his public role." The Buffalo News also reported that Richardson's management style was criticized as being "poor" and "unilateral" at the college, however that prejudice and racism toward him, particularly by factions such as faculty at the college, could have played a role in the issue. It was further reported that Richardson's predecessors had also experienced criticisms and threats of censure by such factions. As a result of the alleged poor communications and management style of Richardson, it was reported that several top administrators at the college resigned from their positions. As of 1995–1996, there were three other top administrators who were on leave as a result of agreements through Richardson and SUNY.

The issue about race at the college was made public when Dorcas Colvin, an associate vice president for human resources, and an African American woman, communicated with then-SUNY interim chancellor Joseph C. Burke and other government leaders, including then-governor Mario Cuomo by letter, using the "N" word regarding statements by faculty relating to Richardson and the college. Colvin stated she did not desire to be a part of an institution in which the "N" word was used about the president and the college. Richardson described the disclosure as inappropriate and painful. The letter reflected that racism existed at the college and within the College Senate.

In a January 29, 1995 article by Michael Beebe that was published in The Buffalo News, Richardson is quoted, stating regarding his beliefs about the slur:

If someone makes a despicable comment, nothing you can do will erase it. What you have to do is not let it hurt in places where it does not have to hurt...I think in every negative experience, it's always possible for something good to come out of it. If that happens, then I think the pain will have been worth it.

Following the publicity surrounding Colvin's letter, it was reported that Richardson showed positive leadership ability by dealing with the issue and seeing to it that changes to the college's by-laws were enacted, prior to his departure, in order that the environment for future presidents at the college would be improved.

When Richardson announced his resignation, it was rumored that Burke had asked Richardson to resign, though both men denied it. It had been reported that Richardson was forced to resign, or face termination.

Richardson had been chosen, unanimously, by the college's search committee as the new president in 1989 following the departure of D. Bruce Johnstone in becoming SUNY Chancellor. The search encompassed 10 months and included 150 candidates for the position.

== Senior fellowship at the American Association of State Colleges and Universities ==
Following his resignation from Buffalo State College, Richardson became a senior fellow at Washington, DC's American Association of State Colleges and Universities (AASCU).

== Chancellorship of Indiana University Southeast ==
On July 1, 1996, Richardson took the position of chancellor at Indiana University Southeast in New Albany, Indiana. He was the unanimous choice by the university's board of trustees, following the recommendation of the system's president, Myles Brand (1942–2009). There were 100 applicants for the position, and Richardson was one of three finalists.

At the university, Richardson also served as chancellor liaison for the different campuses of the university. Currently, he is Chancellor Emeritus of the university, an honor for which he was named in 2002.

=== Achievements ===
Richardson is known for leading fund-raising campaigns for the university that "brought an abundance of revenue," as well as for increasing student enrollments and improving technology. Technology improvements to the campus under Richardson's leadership included increasing "the capacity of the existing connection by 30 times to...a DS3 circuit, capable of transferring 45 Mbs of data, nearly 1,000 times the speed of a household modem." The improved technology network allowed all of Indiana University's campuses to be technologically interconnected.

Richardson is also the first leader at the university to have created a vision statement for it.

=== As Chancellor emeritus ===
As Chancellor Emeritus of the university, Richardson has remained involved in its activities. During the 2006–2007 academic year, a presentation titled, "Citizens Making a Difference in America," sponsored by the university's Common Experience Program, featured Richardson, among other leaders, as an event speaker to increase dialogue about diversity. In 2007, he gave a talk about his experiences with growing up in a segregated, rural community in Tennessee.

== Community involvement ==
Richardson is a board member of many organizations. Some of these organizations include The Negro Educational Review, Inc.; the Community Foundation of Southern Indiana; the Southern Indiana Chamber of Commerce; and the Louisville Ballet, Fund for the Arts.

Additional board memberships of Richardson include the Louisville Area Workforce Development Council; Kentuckiana Metroversity, Inc.; Greater Louisville, Inc.; Project E; the Federal Reserve Bank of Boston; and Health Enterprises Network.

Academic offices
Preceded by Leon Rand	Chancellor of Indiana University Southeast; 1996-2002	Succeeded by Barbara Bichelmeyer
Preceded by D. Bruce Johnstone	6th President of Buffalo State College; 1989-1996	Succeeded by Muriel A. Howard
