= Deborah F. Stanley =

President of State University of New York

Deborah Stanley

Chancellor of the State University of New York Acting
- In office January 14, 2022 – January 9, 2023
- Preceded by: Jim Malatras
- Succeeded by: John King Jr.

10th President of the State University of New York, Oswego
- In office August 1, 1997 – December 31, 2021
- Preceded by: Stephen Weber
- Succeeded by: Mary Toale (acting)

Personal details
- Born: Deborah Flemma Stanley Utica, New York, U.S.
- Education: Syracuse University (BA, JD)

Deborah Flemma Stanley is an American lawyer and academic administrator who served as president of the State University of New York at Oswego from August 1, 1997 until December 2021. In December 2022, she was awarded the honorary title of President Emeritus.

She also served as Interim Chancellor of the State University of New York from January 2022 to January 2023.

== Early life and education ==
Stanley was born and raised in Utica, New York. She earned a B.A. in English from Syracuse University and a JD from Syracuse University College of Law in 1977. She is admitted to the New York State Bar Association.

== Career ==
Stanley was appointed president at SUNY Oswego on August 1, 1997, after serving on an interim basis from 1995 to 1997. She previously served as vice president for Academic Affairs, Provost, and executive assistant to the president.

Stanley served as a commissioner for the American Council on Education, and was a member of American Association of State Colleges and Universities Women Presidents group.

She also sits on the Board of Directors of Alliance Bank and Metropolitan Development Association, and is Vice President of the Metropolitan Development Foundation of Syracuse. In 2019, Stanley was named as a co-chair of the Central New York Regional Economic Development Council, a division of the Empire State Development Corporation.

On December 20, 2021, the State University of New York Board of Trustees appointed Stanley as Interim Chancellor, after the resignation of Jim Malatras. She served in that position from January 2022 to January 2023, until a permanent chancellor could be hired.

== Awards ==
In 2022, she received the Donna Shavlik Award from the American Council on Education.
