= Lisa Vollendorf =

American academic

6th President of Empire State University
- Incumbent
- Assumed office July 1, 2022
- Preceded by: Beth Berlin (interim); Jim Malatras

Academic background
- Education: University of Pennsylvania; Colorado State University
- Thesis: The body imperiled: Violence against women in Maria de Zayas's novellas (1995)
- Doctoral advisor: Marina S. Brownlee

Academic work
- Discipline: Spanish literature
- Institutions: Empire State University; University of Northern Colorado; Sonoma State University; San Jose State University; California State University; Wayne State University; Miami University

Lisa Vollendorf is an American scholar of sixteenth and seventeenth century women's cultural history in Iberia and Latin America, and college administrator. She is currently the president of Empire State University.

== Academic career ==
She received BA in English and Spanish from Colorado State University in 1990, an MA in Spanish and Latin American Literatures from University of Pennsylvania in 1992, and a Ph.D. in Romance Languages from the University of Pennsylvania in 1995.

She began her teaching career at Miami University of Ohio where she taught from 1995 to 1997 and earned tenure at Wayne State University in Detroit, where she worked from 1997 to 2005.

She was department chair, senate chair, and professor of Spanish at California State University, Long Beach (2005–12).

Vollendorf was Dean of Humanities and the Arts at San José State University from 2012 to 2017, where she led efforts in collaboration with the city of San José to bring the Hammer Theatre to life. From 2017 to 2020, she was Provost and Executive Vice President of Sonoma State University in Rohnert Park, California. She left this position due to circumstances involving the husband of the then president of the university and students. She accepted a $600,000 payment by the CSU System to not investigate allegations and left Sonoma State University.

She was Interim Provost and Chief Academic Officer at the University of Northern Colorado, and Special Advisor for Academic Planning and Operational Continuity for the California State University system from 2020 to 2021.

In 2022, she became the sixth President of Empire State University, part of the State University of New York (SUNY).

== Bibliography ==
- Women Playwrights of Early Modern Spain, Ed. Nieves Romero-Díaz and Lisa Vollendorf. Trans. Harley Erdman (The Other Voice in early modern Europe Series, Iter Press and the Arizona Center for Medieval and Renaissance Studies, 2016)
- Theorising the Ibero-American Atlantic, Ed. Harald E. Braun and Lisa Vollendorf (Brill, 2013)
- Women, Religion, and the Atlantic World (1600–1800), Ed. Daniella Kostroun and Lisa Vollendorf (University of Toronto Press, July 2009)
- Literatura y feminismo en España: s. XV - XXI, Ed. and coord., Lisa Vollendorf (Barcelona: Icaria Press, February 2006)
- The Lives of Women: A New History of Inquisitional Spain (Vanderbilt University Press, 2005)
- Reclaiming the Body: María de Zayas's Early Modern Feminism (University of North Carolina Press, July 2001)
- Spain's Feminist Tradition (Publications of the Modern Language Association of America, 2001).
