= Jim Malatras =

American educator and university chancellor

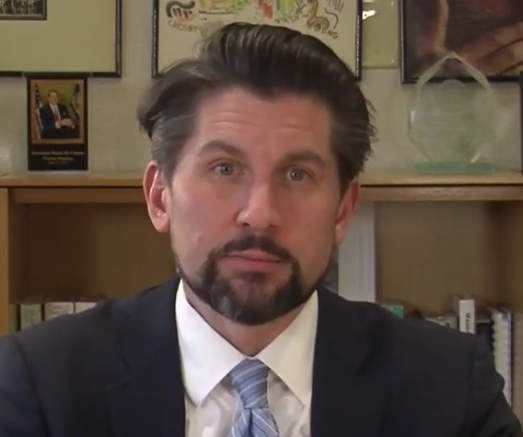
- Malatras in 2021

14th Chancellor of the State University of New York
- In office August 31, 2020 – January 14, 2022
- Preceded by: Kristina M. Johnson
- Succeeded by: Deborah F. Stanley (interim)

5th President of Empire State College
- In office July 15, 2019 – August 30, 2020
- Preceded by: Merodie A. Hancock; Mitchell Nesler (acting)
- Succeeded by: Beth Berlin (acting)

Personal details
- Born: 1977 or 1978 (age 48–49) Westwood, New Jersey, U.S.
- Education: University at Albany (BA, MA, PhD)
- Institutions: University at Albany, SUNY; Rockefeller Institute of Government; State University of New York
- Website: Official website

Academic background
- Thesis: A tale of two movements: Collective legal consciousness: Producing and employing the law (2008)
- Doctoral advisor: Scott Barclay
- Other advisor: Sally Friedman

James J. Malatras (born 1977) is an American former academic administrator. He served as the 14th chancellor of the State University of New York from August 2020 to January 2022 and as the 5th president of Empire State College from July 2019 to August 2020.

Malatras received a Ph.D from the Rockefeller College of Public Affairs and Policy. In 2017, Malatras was elected as a fellow of the National Academy of Public Administration.

== Early life and education ==
Malatras was born in Westwood, New Jersey and grew up in the Lower Hudson Valley region of New York. Graduating from the Ellenville Central School District. He studied at the University at Albany, earning bachelor's and master's degrees in political science. He then worked as a staff member for Assemblymember Richard L. Brodsky from 2000 to 2007. During that time, he earned a Ph.D. from Albany's Rockefeller College of Public Affairs & Policy.

== State government and SUNY ==
In 2007, he became a policy advisor for then-Attorney General of New York Andrew Cuomo. Following Cuomo's election as Governor of New York, Malatras was executive director of the New NY Education Reform Commission from 2012 to 2014. In July 2013, he became Vice Chancellor for Policy and Chief of Staff under then-SUNY Chancellor Nancy L. Zimpher, remaining in that role until August 2014. After leaving SUNY System Administration, he rejoined the Cuomo administration as director of state operations, serving until his appointment in 2017 as President of the Rockefeller Institute of Government, a SUNY-affiliated think tank.

In spring 2019, SUNY's board of trustees appointed Malatras as president of Empire State College in Saratoga Springs, New York. While president, he remained at the Rockefeller Institute as chair of the board of advisors. Following the outbreak of the COVID-19 pandemic in New York, Governor Cuomo appointed Malatras to chair the Reimagine Education Advisory Council, which consisted of education leaders from across the state.

=== Appointment as SUNY chancellor ===
On August 21, 2020, SUNY's board of trustees voted to name Malatras as the 14th chancellor of SUNY, effective August 31. He succeeded Kristina M. Johnson, who left to become President of the Ohio State University. and Cary Staller, both of whom disagreed with the lack of a national search. The two nonvoting members of the board, University Faculty Senate president Gwen Kay and Faculty Council of Community Colleges president Christy Fogal, announced in a joint statement that their respective organizations will vote on a motion of no confidence in the politically appointed trustees who had voted in favor of the appointment.

== SUNY Chancellor (2020–2022) ==
On June 17, 2021, Malatras approved pay raises for State University of New York Upstate Medical University nurses commending their resiliency during the COVID-19 pandemic. The increase is slated to be between $2,000 and $3,500 more per year in a deal negotiated between the university and union ultimately approved by Malatras.

After less than two years into the job, Malatras announced in December 2021 that he would resign amid furor over inappropriate private texts to friends, as well as comments he had made about a female colleague in 2019. On December 20, 2021, Deborah F. Stanley was appointed the Chancellor on interim basis.
