= Erick Johnson =

Erick Johnson may refer to:

- Erick H. Johnson, member of the Wisconsin State Assembly
- Erick Johnson (artist), American artist

== See also ==
- Eric Johnson (disambiguation)
