= Muriel A. Howard =

American academic administrator

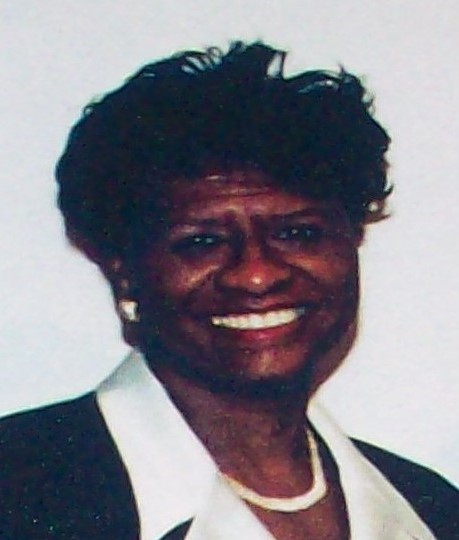

President, Buffalo State College
- In office 1996–2009
- Preceded by: F.C. Richardson
- Succeeded by: Aaron Podolefsky

Personal details
- Born: Wilson, North Carolina
- Spouse: Albert "Mickey" Howard
- Education: University at Buffalo, Richmond College
- Profession: Higher education, Academic administration

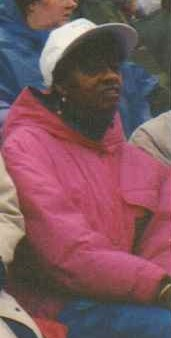
Muriel (Moore) Howard at University of Buffalo Football Game, 1992

Muriel A. Howard (b. 1947/1948) (formerly Muriel A. Moore) is the former president of the American Association of State Colleges and Universities (AASCU) in Washington, D.C., and served as the seventh president of Buffalo State College at the State University of New York (SUNY) system from 1996 to 2009. Prior to her presidency at Buffalo State College, she was the vice president for public services and urban affairs at the SUNY educational institution, the University at Buffalo, where she worked for 23 years. Howard was educated at public universities in New York State, as well as at Harvard University, where she graduated from the University's Institute of Management. Howard has been a leader and member of many corporate boards of directors; and councils and committees in higher education and city government. Further, she has been the recipient of many awards and honors throughout her career.

== Early life ==
Howard was born in Wilson, North Carolina, but lived some of her later childhood years and youth in Queens, New York. She moved to Buffalo, New York when she became a student at the University at Buffalo.

== Education and honorary degrees ==
She received her Bachelor of Arts in sociology from Richmond College, City University of New York; and her master's of education and doctorate in educational organization, administration, and policy from the University at Buffalo, She also graduated from Harvard University's Institute of Management.

Howard has received six honorary degrees, including, in part:

- Doctor of Humane Letters, Keene State College, Keene, New Hampshire, August 2010;
- Doctor of Humane Letters, College of Staten Island, Staten Island, New York, May 2010;
- Doctor of Humane Letters, Grambling State University, Grambling, Louisiana, May 2010; and
- Doctor of Humane Letters, New York City Technical College, City University of New York, May 2002.

== Academic interests ==
Howard's professional and scholarly interests include the support of education; educational leadership; and the representation of women and minorities in both the academy and public service.

== Vice Presidency at the University at Buffalo ==
Howard held the highest post at the University prior to becoming President of Buffalo State College. She was a member of UB President Bill Greiner's administrative team.

Upon being named to her position as vice president for Public Service and Urban Affairs at UB, Howard had much to share regarding her vision for UB.

In a December 2, 1992 Buffalo News article by Henry L. Davis, Howard is quoted, stating about UB upon her new appointment:

We will be out there on the front lines talking to community leaders and putting together ways to help the community on issues that have to do with the future of Buffalo, whether it's health care, housing, human services, education or architecture. We have a lot of talent here, and we can apply it to public service. We want to engage the community in discussions that lead to real action. We want to begin to make a difference. If you tap the talent here in the right way, it will work and respond.

== Presidency at Buffalo State College ==
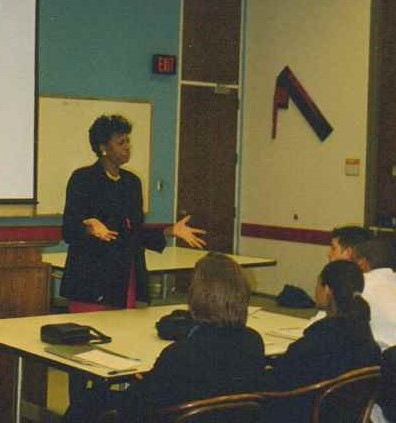
Muriel Howard Speaking at MOOG Leadership Weekend, East Aurora, New York, 2000

As the leader of Buffalo State College, Howard headed a campus of more than 11,000 students; approximately 1,700 faculty and staff; and a financial operation of more than $214 million. She is also the first woman to have led the college.

=== Appointment ===
Former New York State Assembly Member Sam Hoyt graduated from the College and the college was in his district; he shared his perspective about Howard's appointment.

Of Howard's appointment to the Buffalo State College presidency, Hoyt said of her in the December 12, 1995 city edition of The Buffalo News:

I think she's a terrific choice [to head Buffalo State College]. Muriel Moore [Howard] has shown incredible leadership.

Howard (then-Moore) began her leadership at the college as Interim President.

=== Leadership ===
Prior to coming to the college, Howard had little experience in interacting with faculty, however her organizational skills and ability to resolve conflicts were praised. Additionally, she was praised as a "tough administrator" who "knows the system" by former Buffalo Common Council President George K. Arthur; and it was said that she had the respect of students. The college had a reputation as a "tough place to manage," and was expected to have difficulty in attracting qualified candidates to the position of the presidency.

Quoted in an April 24, 1996 article by Karen Brady in The Buffalo News, Howard stated about the College:

I've found in Buffalo State an energetic, exciting and dedicated community. There is tremendous pride, determination and support in our faculty, staff, and students, as well as our alumni and community partners. It is inspiring to see so much potential here, and I am looking forward to being part of the college community and helping it pursue more fully its academic mission.

In her Inaugural Address, Howard focused on the diversity of the college as a strength.

In 1996, Howard is quoted in a November 2, 1996 edition of the Afro-American Red Star, a requite from her Inaugural Address, stating:

There is more in our diversity to hold us together than to pull us apart...We as a college and we as a society urgently need the strength of all of our people as we move toward the next century.

Within one month of assuming her leadership position at the college, Howard shared three short-term goals for strengthening it in an address to faculty. Those three goals included "increasing recruitment and retention of students; developing strategies to address the 1996-97 budget; [and] dealing with the 'institutional climate' that has emerged."

On the 125th anniversary of the college in 1996, Howard oversaw many events that celebrated the quasquicentennial event. On that day, there were proclamations issued by Buffalo Mayor Anthony Masiello as well as Erie County Executive Dennis Gorski. Celebrations included a cake in the shape of Rockwell Hall, a champagne toast, a big band, a chorale ensemble and additional wind ensembles, fireworks, tours of campus arts centers, exhibits, and a play area for kids.

=== Challenges ===
During her tenure as interim president, Howard's main goal is "dealing directly with allegations of racial and sexual discrimination" at the college. Howard stated in February 1996 that the college had held 60 programs on racial and cultural diversity, and gender during the previous fall. The Institute for the Healing of Racism began a two-month forum in the Spring 1996 semester at the college; and closed hearings on sexual harassment and gender bias were being held within the College Senate's Committee on the Status of Women. Howard stated her belief of the College being "a real role model for the community."

In the period from 1996 to 1998, there were a number of deans and administrators who had been on leave through an arrangement with the previous college president, F.C. Richardson, and SUNY, and/or who had resigned to take other posts or due to retirement. In 1996, as a result of those on leave or because of resignations, there was only one permanent academic post that had remained filled at the college. At that time, there were five top leaders at the College who were either on leave or who had resigned to take other posts. Howard was in the process of considering applicants in order to fill open and/or interim positions during that time. One dean who left to take another position stated that it was a time in the college's history in which important leadership choices were to be made that would take the institution into the next century.

=== Advanced telecommunications network ===
In 1997, through Buffalo Mayor Anthony Masiello's office and under the direction of Buffalo State College's Center for Applied Research in Interactive Technologies, CityNet, an advanced telecommunications network that links 14 educational and community sites in Buffalo was launched. For more than two years, Masiello and his team worked with NYNEX and Bell Atlantic to lay the foundation for the network, which is funded by Bell Atlantic for $1.9 million.

Of the launching of the telecommunications network, Howard stated in a November 25, 1997 Buffalo News article by Karen Brady:

We are delighted that, through CityNet, Buffalo State College has been able to join with the City of Buffalo to serve the educational needs of the people of New York State in new and exciting ways.

=== International distance learning partnership ===
In 1998, Howard made a personal effort to expand the Nurturing Initiative and Achievements (NIA) in Students Mentor Program at the college by offering a distance learning program at San José, Costa Rica. Howard went to Costa Rica in order to inaugurate a network that connects San Jose's Lincoln School with the college, as well as Clarence Central, Grover Cleveland, and City Honors high schools.

=== Revitalization of historic landmarks ===
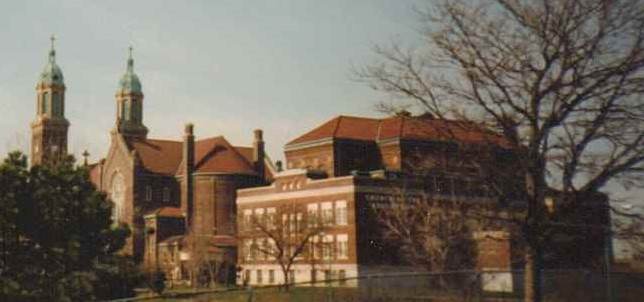
View of Richardson Olmsted Complex from Buffalo State College, 2000

Reported in a 1998 Buffalo News article was that Howard envisioned in 1995 that the Carriage House on the property of the President's Residence could be transformed into a guest house. The House had been used as servant's quarters after it was first built. The Junior League of Buffalo and Chase Pitkin contributed to the remodeling of the Carriage House, with the Junior League identifying it as its 1997 Decorator Show House. The Carriage House was built in 1912; and now serves as a guest house for visitors of the college, providing much lower rates for accommodation than hotels at which visitors would otherwise stay.

Howard participated in talks with the Buffalo Psychiatric Center, the Buffalo Mayor's Office, and others regarding usage expansion for the psychiatric center. Buffalo State College has occupied Buffalo Psychiatric Center lands since the 1960s; and phases of expansion have occurred in recent years that have revitalized and refurbished parts of the facility, including the Richardson Olmsted Complex, for different uses. One of the interests of the college was to use lands for expansion, and to build a new Burchfield Penney Art Center, a desire that was eventually achieved.

Regarding the College's interests for joint use of the psychiatric center land, Howard stated in a June 10, 1999 article by Kevin Collison in The Buffalo News: I think the answer to the property is to bring together the public needs of education and also have space for clean private enterprise to bring dollars into the community.

=== Campus bookstore controversy ===
During the Fall semester of 1998, controversy surrounding the campus bookstore contract was made public. Traditionally, Follett College Stores - the largest college bookstore company in the country - held the bookstore contract at the college. Concern by college administration that many college textbooks were being sold beyond the list price prompted the submission of a new bookstore contract with Barnes & Noble by Howard to the state comptroller, Carl McCall. Barnes & Noble is the largest book retailer in the United States. As a result, - and due to the college already maintaining a contract with Follett - the executive board of the college's Faculty Student Association (FSA) voted to withhold $25,000 in discretionary funds during that semester, funds that are traditionally issued to the college president for discretionary purposes. This move by the FSA was unprecedented; however the aim of involvement by FSA was to obtain a judicious decision about the matter from the state comptroller. The bookstore contract for 1998 also included that a new building to house it would be constructed.

Howard ended up contracting with Barnes & Noble amid appeals to the state comptroller by two of three bidders for the bookstore contract. In a 1998 article by FSA President Michael Paluch that appeared in The Buffalo News, Paluch stated that, as a result of the change, "Textbook prices will be higher, student wages will be lower, and the college will get substantially less construction dollars for a new store from Barnes & Noble than from the Faculty-Student Association."

=== Professional endeavors ===
In 1996, Howard spoke at a businesswomen's networking luncheon reception at the College that celebrated Women's History Month, and more specifically, Women's History Week.

In 1998, Howard attended the second conference of African-American college presidents, held in Washington, DC. The Washington Post article of June 14, 1998 by Peter S. Goodman stated that only 26 college presidents in the United States at the time were African-American, this number being reflective of the more than 1,800 colleges in America that are majority-white. The main purpose of the conference was to create dialogue about race in higher education and to increase the numbers of African-Americans holding top leadership posts in American academia.

=== Tenure culmination ===
When Howard announced that she was leaving the college to take on the national role of leading the AASCU, an organization that advocates for and promotes the interests of 430 public colleges and universities, Hoyt stated that her crowning achievement at the college was likely the Burchfield Penney Arts Center. Former New York State Assembly Member Sam Hoyt stated that Howard raised the college's stature both in the state and the nation. He additionally stated that she would be difficult to replace, and that she would be sorely missed. Her leadership of the College provided increased stability for it, as well as increased student enrollment during her 13 years there. During her last year as president of the college, Howard's salary was reported to be $220,000.

== Presidency of the American Association of State Colleges and Universities ==
=== Leadership ===
In 2009, it was announced that Howard would be leaving Buffalo State College to become the president of the AASCU in Washington, DC. From August 2009 to January 2018, she served in that capacity. She is the first African-American and first woman to be president of the organization.

In 2009, Howard was interviewed for an article that appeared in The Chronicle of Higher Education with regards to her appointment as president of the AASCU.

In her interview by Sara Hebel in 2009 that was published in The Chronicle of Higher Education, Howard stated regarding her leadership style:

I'm definitely a consensus builder, but I'm decisive. I enjoy working collegially with other people. I enjoy watching other people excel. I believe no one today should have to work for an institution that doesn't encourage professional development. Coaching and getting feedback on your work is critical, just like it is in the classroom. Someone needs to encourage you to try something for the first time, and someone needs to give you honest feedback. It's important to work with people on defining what really are your core values.

=== Support for comprehensive immigration reform ===
As AASCU president, Howard has shown support for comprehensive immigration reform. She has stated support for the Pass the Dream Act, for enhancing H1-B Visas, and for streamlining green cards. She states that all of these actions will support students in America who are undocumented, and will help maintain American competitiveness, as well as keeping "talent...at home."

=== Speeches ===
In 2013, Howard gave the keynote address at the State University of New York (SUNY) at Brockport's Annual Diversity Conference. The theme of the 2013 Conference was "Building Community through Diversity: Championing Access and Equity;" and Howard's speech was titled, "Community and the 21st Century Student." The focus of Howard's speech was on how public colleges and universities can achieve that objective.

In her 2013 keynote speech given at SUNY Brockport, Howard is quoted, stating about students, schools, and diversity:

I believe your students already understand that if they are to become successful leaders that they will have to engage constituencies of varied backgrounds. Diverse schools enrich the lives of all students and prepares them to be successful in a multicultural world.

=== Retirement ===
Howard retired as president of AASCU in January 2018, and Dr. Mildred García was appointed president of AASCU.

== Community involvement ==
=== As chair or member of organizational boards ===
Howard's community involvement included membership on the executive committee for the Buffalo Niagara Partnership, Niagara University Board of Directors, Buffalo Public Schools Foundation Board of Directors, and the King Urban Life Center Board of Directors. She also served on the corporate board of directors for the Farm Credit of Western New York, and the Fleet Bank Community Advisory Board. She continues to serve on the Merchants Insurance Company Board.

Active in the Buffalo Niagara Partnership, Howard advocated for improvement in the area's economy. Specifically, she stated that community projects such as building a new convention center may be completed, however the economy must improve in order for people to go to the convention center. Another concern of the group is that revitalization of the economy in the area must occur in addition to the completion of individual construction projects. Howard was also among leaders who supported the desire of younger leaders in having a stronger voice in community affairs, but was not successful in this regard due to the influence of the Old Guard.

She was a member of the State University of New York (SUNY) Advisory Council on Teacher Education, and served on the SUNY Board of Directors of the Center for Russia. She co-chaired the State University of New York Provost's Advisory Task Force on General Education, establishing guidelines for the institution of a general education curricula throughout the SUNY system, and was a member of the New York State Blue Ribbon Commission on Youth Leadership.

Howard was a member of the Erie Community College Board of Trustees search committee. She also served on the search committee for the Buffalo Public Schools Superintendent, and as co-chair for the City of Buffalo Mayoral Transition Team.

Howard is a former chair of the AASCU Board of Directors. She serves on the National Survey on Student Engagement Advisory Board, the Coalition of Urban and Metropolitan Universities Board of Directors, where she chairs the Communications and Public Relations Committee and the American Council on Education (ACE).

Howard is also a member of Delta Sigma Theta sorority and The Links, Incorporated. The sorority includes college-educated women who are geared toward programs for the African-American community. The Links is a non-profit organization composed primarily of professional African-American women who are dedicated to the ideals of community service and friendship.

=== As speaker at area events ===
Howard has been the keynote speaker at many events, including the 34th annual meeting of the fair housing agency, Housing Opportunities Made Equal, in 1997.

At the Buffalo Convention Center in 1998, Howard spoke at the eighth annual Dr. Martin Luther King Jr. breakfast, sponsored by the New Hope Missionary Baptist Church. Howard, in part, encouraged the 600 attendees of the breakfast to work toward achieving the ideals of King, as well as to strive to make a "racially harmonious world and a just society."

In 1998, Howard was the speaker for a meeting of the Women's Club of the University at Buffalo. In 1999, she chaired the United Way campaign for Buffalo and Erie County. She served on the board of directors of that organization, including as chair. She has also chaired the subcommittee on Youth Services and Education for the Erie County Executive's transition team.

== Awards and recognition ==
Howard received the Governor's New York State Division of Women Award for Excellence in Education; Citation Award from the National Conference for Community and Justice; American Jewish Committee Institute of Human Relations Award; and the University at Buffalo Graduate School of Education Distinguished Alumni Award. She also received the Staten Island College Distinguished Alumna Award; the Black Educators Association of Western New York Educator of the Year Award; and the Minority Bar Association of Western New York Award for Community Service.

Further, Howard received the SUNY at Buffalo, Newman Center, Catholic Campus Ministry, Distinguished Alumnus Award. She is a recipient of the SUNY Chancellor's Award for Excellence in Professional Service, and was a charter inductee in the Western New York Women's Hall of Fame. in 1997 at UB, she received the Bernice Poss Award from the Western New York Regional Committee of the American Council on Education/National Identification Program for the Advancement of Women in Higher Education.

Howard was listed in the Buffalo News 2001 Leadership Survey as the "Most Powerful Woman in Western New York." In April 2006, she received the Outstanding Alumni Community Leadership Medal from the University at Buffalo Alumni Association. She was also the recipient of the 2006 Athena Award. This award, sponsored by the Western New York Women's Fund and the Buffalo Niagara Partnership, honors women professionals who have attained and personify the highest levels of professional excellence, demonstrate support for the goals of women professionals, and provide significant and selfless assistance on their behalf.

Buffalo State College instituted the Muriel A. Howard All College Honors Program in 2013 in her honor.

== Personal life ==
Howard has lived near Washington, DC, in Inwood, West Virginia and Chevy Chase, Maryland, with her husband, Albert "Mickey" Howard.

Academic offices
| Preceded by F.C. Richardson | 7th President of Buffalo State College; 1996-2009 | Succeeded by Aaron Podolefsky |
