= Systemness =

Systemness is the state, quality, or condition of a complex system, that is, of a set of interconnected elements that behave as, or appear to be, a whole, exhibiting behavior distinct from the behavior of the parts. The term is new and has been applied to large social phenomena and organizations (healthcare and higher education) by advocates of higher degrees of system-like, coherent behavior for delivering value to stakeholders.

In sociology, Montreal-based Polish academic Szymon Chodak (1973) used "societal systemness" in English to describe the empirical reality that inspired Emile Durkheim.

The healthcare-related usage of the term was as early as 1986 in a Dutch psychiatric research paper. It was adapted to describe the sustainability efforts of healthcare institutions amidst budget cuts during the Great Recession.

The higher educational use appears to have featured in professional discussions between sociologist Neil Smelser and University of California Chancellor and President Clark Kerr in the 1950s or 60s; in the foreword to Kerr's 2001 memoir, Smelser uses the term in inverted commas in recalling such discussions.

The term's overt operationalization, however, was instituted by The State University of New York's (SUNY) Chancellor Nancy L. Zimpher in the State of the University Address on January 9, 2012. Zimpher noted systemness as "the coordination of multiple components that, when working together, create a network of activity that is more powerful than any action of individual parts on their own." The concept was later explored in the volume, Higher Education Systems 3.0, edited by Jason E. Lane and D. Bruce Johnston.

== Use in higher education ==
The term "systemness" has received widespread adoption in discussions within and among the leaders of multi-campus university systems to discuss the evolution of multi-campus collaboration and coordination in a range of different programmatic areas. The term was first coined by Nancy Zimpher, the former chancellor of the State University of New York. In 2019, Daniel Greenstein, chancellor of the Pennsylvania State System of Higher Education launched a blog, titled "Signs of Systemness," noting "Our universities will be stronger, better, and offer even greater value to their students and communities by working together." A 2020 review of the president of Washington State University, a developing multi-campus system, revealed that one of the core question facing the institution is how to develop "systemness," stating, "as Washington State University morphs from a single institution into a system, it is fair to say that it is in the process of figuring out what that equilibrium should be and how to get there." Futurist Bryan Alexander suggested that systemness is related to how "public university systems pool resources and expand their collaborative planning."

=== Adoption of the term by Nancy Zimpher ===
Chancellor Zimpher explained her initial use of the term in the January 2012 Address:

“The State University of New York has so many assets, but there is not one greater than our ‘systemness.' Beyond the individual strengths that each of our 64 campuses possess, there is a powerful and unmatched capacity to reach our most ambitious goals together and to realize our highest achievements. In 2012 and beyond, SUNY will tap into that power of ‘systemness’ to create a more affordable, productive, and accessible university, while doing its part to generate economic development, create jobs, and prepare the workforce of tomorrow for New York State."

In January 2012, The Nelson A. Rockefeller Institute of Government at the State University of New York at Albany published an explanation of Zimpher's application of the term to the SUNY system:

"Acting alone, each of our 64 campuses can and has made great achievements. But think of what can be accomplished when we leverage all of our individual strengths and act as one formidable force armed with an ambitious yet disciplined set of goals that promise to create not just a stronger public university system but also a better way of life for all of New York."

The term was again used in an address by Zimpher at the SUNY Conference on Instruction and Technology on May 30, 2012. It highlighted the value proposition made possible through the sixty-four SUNY campuses across the state, working together to produce better results than that of all of them working apart.

In her final State of SUNY address, Zimpher noted, "“We do better together than we can on our own. I’m often asked, ‘How do you run 64 campuses?’ And I always respond, ‘I don’t do it; we do it.’”

==== Principles of Systemness ====
In August 2012, gathered leaders from across the SUNY spectrum – crossing divisional, regional, and sector lines – developed these guiding principles in conjunction with their coursework and exercises at the SUNY Summer Leadership Development Program. The work here was done together, and we hope this assists SUNY in its Systemness.

Nelson Rockefeller's audacious vision of an educated New York led to the foundation of a 64 campus network of accessible public colleges and universities to educate the state. The time is now to extend that vision to the challenges of the modern age by drawing on the diversity of the distinct missions of the 64 campuses to collaborate, find new synergies, and to enhance and revitalize SUNY as the primary engine for New York's success. Systemness should be guided by the following five principles which, in part, owe themselves to Collins and Hanson (2011):

- Vision – The vision of SUNY is to be greater than the sum of any one of its parts. This vision embraces innovation, creativity, and growth. Systemness is a student-centered network that fosters collegiality, diversity, and economic growth for the greater New York community.
- Discipline – Discipline begins with a durable set of operating practices that leads to achieving consistently attainable and actionable goals.
- Empirical creativity – Systemness provides the opportunity to galvanize the efforts of many through evidence-based creativity for the good of the whole.
- Risk-taking – There is strength is Systemness. Calculated risk-taking by individual campuses will produce vastly superior results for the whole. This will happen in concert without the sacrifice of any campus identity.
- Return on luck – Another guiding principle of Systemness is being positioned to take advantage of our collective assets as a system and being prepared to respond to circumstances beyond our control.

==== Coverage by the news media ====
A newspaper article in the Albany Times Union (Hearst Corporation) run on January 9, 2012 calls the term "an overarching theme" of SUNY's future as outlined in Zimpher's State of the University Address.

The online publication Inside Higher Ed published an opinion piece by a professor at the University of Wisconsin-Madison on October 4, 2012 which noted the expanded usage of systemness and its application to higher education. The author states that systemness is an idea to promote "collaboration across campuses to coordinate program offerings and services, striving for common goals, and working together to count student successes as mutually beneficial."

=== State University of New York system early use ===
On February 1, 2012, the term was used by Zimpher as she spoke before New York State Senate and Assembly Committees about the 2012-13 Executive Budget Proposal to describe SUNY's systemness to "make the biggest possible impact for all New Yorkers."

SUNY has titled its annual Critical Issues in Higher Education Conference "Harnessing Systemness | Delivering Performance" slated for November 2012.

In Precipice or Crossroads?, the term is highlighted in a section titled "Cultivating systemness to take the land-grant mission to scale" where the term is used in its context to describe the modernization of the principle of land grant schools:

Between and among the land grants, there is no universal or agreed-upon curriculum, no transfer pipeline or assurances of articulation, no umbrella for administrative oversight or shared administrative functions. These schools were not originally designed to function thus; they were designed as individual and separate institutions to serve local needs and to bolster local agrarian and industrial economies.

== Use in healthcare ==
The term has been used ambiguously throughout healthcare until the Great Recession. At that period, professionals began to use systemness to describe their combination of IT assets and services to provide efficient healthcare.

The term was the centerpoint on August 20, 2007 at The Kaiser Permanente Institute for Health Policy's roundtable on “Improving Health Care ‘Systemness’: A Look at the Evidence and Policy Implications." The conference applied the term to describe how the Kaiser Permanente consortium can consolidate medical resources to achieve higher-quality output for all parties involved.

The Kaiser Permanente Institute names seven characteristics of systemness in healthcare: Governance, strong physician leadership, organizational culture, clear & shared aims, accountability & transparency, patient-centeredness and teams.

Similarly, the Governance Institute of California in 2005 explored systemness in healthcare in 'Pursuing Systemness: The Evolution of Large Health Systems':

"...Leaders generally use the term to define looking and acting more like a single integrated organization rather than a collection of independently functioning pieces. Systemness means being more tightly- knit, shifting decision-making responsibility and authority away from the subsidiary operating units to the corporate level, and centralizing or standardizing key management systems and processes. Systemness is consistent with the corporate enterprise model of governance."
