= UAW-Ford University =

The UAW-Ford University is an online program designed and implemented by the University of Michigan under contract with the National Program Center of the United Auto Workers Union and Ford Motor Company. Its goal is to facilitate the college educations of UAW bargained for employees using distance learning technologies and pedagogies developed at Michigan. The program began in 1999. Its innovative use of both synchronous and asynchronous technologies let to the award of Laureate status from the Computerworld/Smithsonian Honors Program.

The UAW-Ford University program has a partnership with the online Empire State College.
