= Sam Hoyt =

American politician

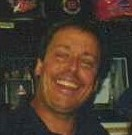

Member of the New York State Assembly from the 144th district
- In office 1992–2011
- Preceded by: William Hoyt
- Succeeded by: Sean M. Ryan

Personal details
- Born: William Ballard Hoyt III; January 9, 1962 (age 64) Buffalo, New York, U.S.
- Party: Democratic
- Spouse: Constance "Connie" (Gallivan) Hoyt
- Children: two
- Education: Buffalo State College
- Profession: Economic developmentalist

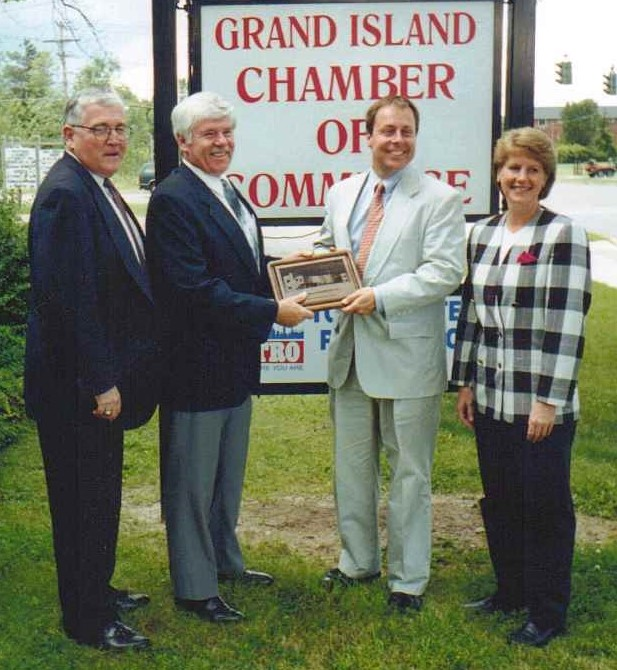
Sam Hoyt Receiving Award from Grand Island, NY Supervisors, 2000

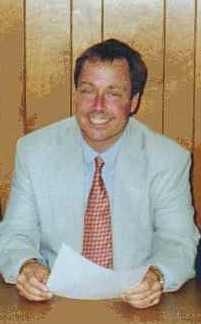
Sam Hoyt, Grand Island, NY, 2000

William Ballard "Sam" Hoyt III (born January 9, 1962) is an American politician from New York. A Democrat, Hoyt is an economic development professional and was a member of the New York State Assembly from 1992 to 2011. He represented the 144th Assembly district, consisting of part of Buffalo, New York, and all of Grand Island, New York, from 1992 to 2011. Hoyt was first elected to succeed his late father, William Hoyt. He resigned from office in 2011 after a sexual harassment suit and he previously was the subject of an ethics investigation in 2008 concerning a two-year sexual relationship with a 23-year-old assembly intern, named Lori Gradwell.

He was then appointed to an economic development position as Regional President of the Empire State Development Corporation in New York State Governor Andrew M. Cuomo's administration. He was also interim chairman of the Erie Canal Harbor Development Corporation, and Vice Chairman of the Buffalo and Fort Erie Public Bridge Authority.

Hoyt is founder and president of Upstate Strategic Advisors LLC, a full-service PR, lobbying, and government relations firm based in Buffalo, NY

== Early life and education ==
Hoyt grew up on Buffalo's west side and attended area schools, graduating from The Park School of Buffalo, and receiving a Bachelor of Arts degree in political science from Buffalo State College in 1992. He also attended Ohio Wesleyan University.

== Background ==
Prior to entering elected office, Hoyt served as Western New York regional director for U.S. Senator Daniel Patrick Moynihan, and was marketing and promotions director for the Buffalo Bisons minor league baseball team. He represented the 144th Assembly District, encompassing part of Buffalo, New York, and all of Grand Island, New York from 1992 to 2011.

== New York State Assembly career ==
=== Elections ===
Hoyt was first elected in a 1992 special election following the death of his father, William B. Hoyt, who held the office prior to him. From 1992 to 2010, Hoyt won all elections for his assembly seat with voting percentages between 51% and 79% in his favor.

=== Selected electoral history ===
Hoyt's complete electoral history has been tracked, online, at Our Campaigns, and a portion of it is reflected here.

New York State Assembly, 144th District, November 2, 2010 Election
Party	Candidate	Votes	%	±%
Democratic	Sam Hoyt	16,610	53.28	0
Republican	Brian R. Biggie	8,469	27.16	−26.11
Conservative	Joseph Golombek Jr.	6,068	19.46	−33.81

- There were also 31 write-in votes in this election, accounting for 0.10%.
- Hoyt also received votes on both the Independent and Working Family lines in this election.

New York State Assembly, 144th District, Special Election, May 5, 1992
Party	Candidate	Votes	%	±%
Democratic	Sam Hoyt	7,972	74.52	0
Republican	Killian Vetter	1,098	10.26	−64.26
Conservative	Alfred T. Coppola	1,628	15.22	−59.30

- Hoyt also ran on the Liberal ticket in this election.

=== Duties ===
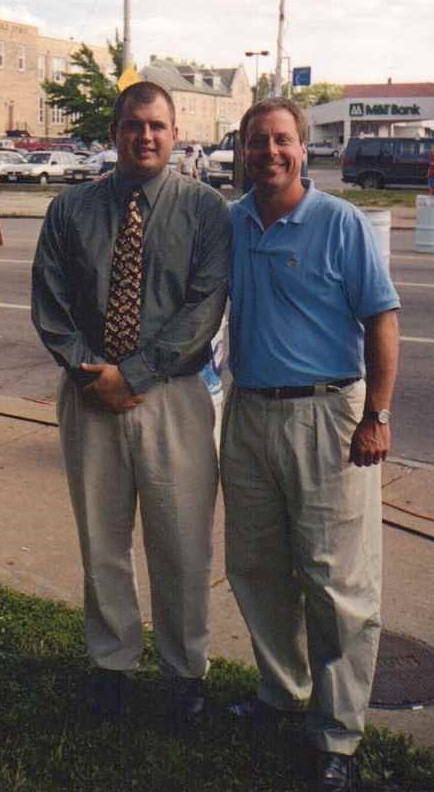
Sam Hoyt with Mark Davis, Buffalo, NY, 2000

In the Assembly, Hoyt served as Majority Whip. As a senior member of the Assembly, he chaired several Assembly committees. In 2007, Assembly Speaker Sheldon Silver appointed Hoyt as the chairman of the Assembly Local Governments Committee. Prior to becoming chairman of this committee, Hoyt was the chairman of the Assembly Oversight, Analysis and Investigations Committee. He is also both a former chairman of the Assembly Task Force on Demographics and Reapportionment, and the Assembly Alcoholism and Drug Abuse Committee. He also co-chaired both the Anti-Flipping and High Speed Rail Task Forces. Hoyt was also a member of the following committees: Ways and Means; Local Governments; Children and Families; Transportation; Energy; Tourism; Arts and Sports Development; Cities; Government Operations; Women's Issues Task Force; and the Puerto Rican/Hispanic Task Force.

=== Political interests ===
Some of Hoyt's political interests have included making state and local governments more efficient and accountable to taxpayers; revitalizing neighborhoods; increasing economic opportunity; and developing the Buffalo waterfront.

=== Political positions ===
Hoyt concentrated on the redevelopment of Upstate New York cities. The passage of the Smart Growth Public Infrastructure Policy Act; Land Bank Program; and State Historic Preservation Tax Credit are among his legislative accomplishments.

In 2009, Hoyt sponsored legislation that was passed to allow the City of Buffalo school district to start the fourth phase of its Joint Schools reconstruction project. As a lifelong environmentalist, in 2008, Hoyt passed a new law to protect old growth forests. The same year, Hoyt sponsored a new law that passed to fund bike paths across New York State, and has worked for their protection.

An advocate of marriage equality, Hoyt supported the Marriage Equality Act, which was passed in June 2011. This Act granted same-sex couples in New York State the freedom to marry under the law, as well as hundreds of rights, benefits, and protections that had been limited to married couples of the opposite sex.

In 2006, Hoyt proposed that a land-locked area between the Peace Bridge to Canada and Porter Avenue be transformed into a park. The strip of land was owned by the New York State Thruway Authority, and its scenic value had been lost due to the development of both the Peace Bridge toll plaza and Interstate-190. That area of land had previously been part of Front Park, designed by Frederick Law Olmsted.

Of his proposed creation of the park, Sam was quoted in an October 9, 2006 McClatchy - Tribune Business News article by Sharon Linstedt, stating:

This would not only offer fantastic views of the waterfront, the Canadian shoreline and sunsets, it will also be a great vantage point for watching West Side Rowing Club regattas. It will be like a natural grandstand.

Hoyt proposed in 2004 that a community-based group be created regarding the restoration of the H.H. Richardson Complex, historic buildings that are part of the Buffalo Psychiatric Center, for use as a center for cultural and educational activities. Hoyt proposed that $100 million be put toward the restoration, which was supported by New York State Governor George Pataki. In 2009, in relation to interests of Buffalo State College in desiring land use expansion of the psychiatric center grounds and vacant buildings, Hoyt stated that Buffalo was famous for its historic architecture.

In 2000, Hoyt, who is an advocate of college students, urged University at Buffalo (UB) leaders Bill Greiner (1934–2009) and Dennis Black to work with staff of the student newspaper, The Spectrum, after students were twice-arrested by campus police for remaining in the newspaper offices after hours to work. The involvement of Hoyt and UB English Department Chairwoman Barbara Bono succeeded in opening communications between UB leadership and the students.

Also active in the area of social justice, Hoyt joined other urban legislators in declaring a state of emergency in the fight against HIV/AIDS in minority communities.

Hoyt introduced legislation that went into effect in 1998 that guaranteed a tax-free week for college students in New York State for the purchase of their college textbooks.

In 1997, Hoyt worked with other legislators on a project aimed at expanding high speed rail in New York State, particularly to Buffalo.

Throughout his tenure, Hoyt was a strong supporter of his alma mater, Buffalo State College, as well as Muriel A. Howard, the president of the college from 1996 to 2009. When Howard took on the role as president of the college, Hoyt stated that she was an excellent choice. When Howard announced that she would be departing from the college, Hoyt stated that she would be difficult to replace and would be sorely missed.

=== Political controversy ===
In 2000, Hoyt was involved in an attempted political coup, led by former majority leader Michael Bragman, of Assembly Speaker Sheldon Silver, in order to oust him from his position. Following the coup, it was stated that Hoyt was unable to enter the circle of inner leadership in the Assembly, though he salvaged his political access to Silver when it was clear that the coup would be unsuccessful.

=== Honors ===
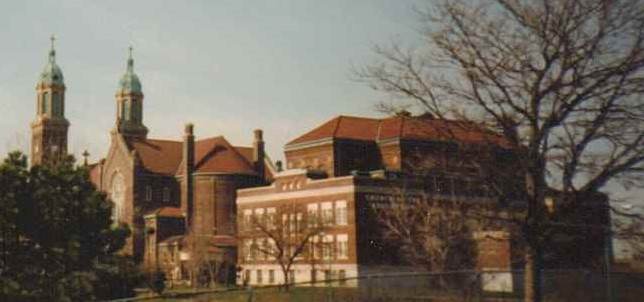
View of Richardson Olmsted Complex from Buffalo State College, 2000

Hoyt received numerous awards, including the 2011 Lifetime Achievement Award by the New York League of Conservation Voters; Elected Official of the Year in 2008 by both the State Historic Preservation Office and American Institute of Architects; the 1992 SUNY Chancellor's Recognition Award; and the 2001 William B. Hoyt Environmental Award from the National Audubon Society that was named in honor of his late father. Hoyt has been a proponent of preserving historical architecture, including the Buffalo Psychiatric Center and its Richardson Olmsted Complex administration building.

Hoyt has been recognized by the Western New York Chemical Dependency Consortium and New York Council on Problem Gambling for his efforts into creating awareness and funding for drug and gambling addiction treatment and prevention programs.

Hoyt has received "Public Citizen of the Year" aware by the New York State Chapter of the National Association of Social Workers and the "Creating a Greener New York Award" from the League of Conservation Voters (2001), as well as the National Family Planning and Reproductive Health Association's Distinguished Public Service Award (2000); the National Association for Mental Illness Public Service Award (2000); and the New York State Public Employees Federation (PEF) Quality Service Award in (1999).

== Relationship with Assembly intern ==
In September 2008, Hoyt was disciplined by New York State Assembly Speaker Sheldon Silver for an inappropriate relationship involving a participant in the Assembly Intern Program based on a report completed by the New York State Assembly Standing Committee on Ethics and Guidance. Silver announced that Hoyt had an "inappropriate personal relationship" with an Assembly intern, and issued a new "policy prohibiting fraternization with student interns." Hoyt was prohibited from future participation in "any student internship program."

The Buffalo News reported that the woman was 23 (Hoyt was 41 at the time) and had graduated from the University at Buffalo Law School. Hoyt did not break any law or Assembly rules, because prior to 2004 there no policy prohibiting relationships with interns (The affair occurred in 2003.) Hoyt said in a statement: "I am a public figure, but I've reconciled with my family, and I'm pleased to report I am happily married. No rules were broken; no laws were broken. I broke my marriage vows."

Information initially investigated by the Ethics Committee included e-mails by two women regarding personal information shared with them by Hoyt.

The second woman whose e-mails were provided to the Ethics Committee was a student assistant for two years, and later, was part of a federal student work program, though there was no evidence that definitively reflected that the two engaged in an affair.

== Empire State Development Corporation and other positions, 2011-2017 ==
In 2011, New York State Governor Andrew M. Cuomo announced Hoyt's appointment as Regional President for the Empire State Development Corporation,

In this position, Hoyt oversaw economic development efforts in the Western, Central, Finger Lakes, and Southern Tier regions of New York State.

In 2012, Hoyt was named interim chairman of the Erie Canal Harbor Development Corporation. He also served as chair of the Buffalo and Fort Erie Peace Bridge Authority.

=== Resignation and sexual-harassment lawsuit ===
Hoyt abruptly resigned in October 2017 amid a state investigation into an extramarital affair with a woman who was a fellow state employee. Hoyt had paid the woman $50,000 in exchange for her agreement to conceal the relationship. A spokesman for the governor said that "With the investigation still pending, Mr. Hoyt separated from state service." Hoyt issued a statement expressing regret for what he termed a "short term, consensual and inappropriate relationship" and stated that: "When I attempted to end the relationship, she threatened me. At that point, over a year ago, my wife and I agreed to a settlement to avoid public embarrassment to our family."

In November 2017, Lisa Marie Cater, a former State Department of Motor Vehicles employee, filed a federal lawsuit against Hoyt alleging sexual harassment. Cater alleges that Hoyt sexually harassed her starting in 2015, shortly after helping her gain employment. Hoyt denies wrongdoing.

==== Findings of New York Ethics Commission ====
On June 11, 2018, the New York State Joint Commission on Public Ethics cleared Hoyt on charges of sexual harassment and assault. The Committee said it reviewed hundreds of pages of records, including emails, employment records, and information from multiple witnesses, and stated that the Cater was uncooperative during the investigation.

== Personal life ==
Hoyt is married to wife, Connie, and has two sons, Clayton and Griffin.

New York State Assembly
Preceded by William Hoyt	New York State Assembly, 144th District; 1992–2011	Succeeded by Sean M. Ryan
