= Rockefeller Institute =

Rockefeller Institute may refer to:

- The Rockefeller Institute of Government
- Rockefeller University, previously known as The Rockefeller Institute for Medical Research
