= Merodie A. Hancock =

American academic administrator

Merodie Hancock

4th President of Thomas Edison State University
- Incumbent
- Assumed office March 5, 2018
- Preceded by: George A. Pruitt

4th President of Empire State College
- In office May 9, 2013 – March 3, 2018
- Preceded by: Alan Davis; Meg Benke (acting)
- Succeeded by: Mitchell Nesler (acting); Jim Malatras

Personal details
- Education: Scripps College (BA); Claremont Graduate University (MBA); Old Dominion University (PhD)

Merodie A. Hancock is an American academic administrator who has served as president of Thomas Edison State University since March 5, 2018. Hancock had previously served as the 4th president of Empire State College from 2013 to 2018.

== Early life and education ==
Hancock is one of 10 children. Her father was an engineer in the United States Air Force and went back to school to become an architect. Her mother earned a master's degree in social work. Hancock earned a bachelor's degree in economics, from Scripps College, an MBA from Claremont Graduate University, and a Ph.D. in urban services and education administration from Old Dominion University. She holds a certificate from the Institute of Educational Management from Harvard University; a certificate from the University Professional Continuing Education Association Leadership Academy at New York University; a certificate in Process Design and Implementation: Reengineering and Change Management from Michael Hammer and Company; and a certificate in Nonprofit Board Leadership from the Dorothy A. Johnson Center for Philanthropy from Grand Valley State University.

== Career ==
She previously served as vice president of Central Michigan University Global Campus. She has also held both teaching and administrative leadership positions at the University of Maryland University College and at Embry–Riddle Aeronautical University. In June 2013, she was appointed by the State University of New York Board of Trustees as the fourth president of Empire State College, and inaugurated on March 27, 2014 as the college's first female president. In December 2017, Hancock was announced as the new president of Thomas Edison State University. She took office in March 2018.

Hancock has been involved in several professional organizations, including the Inside Track Advisory Board, the Distance Education Commission Advisory Group, Council of College and Military Educators, League for Innovation, National Association of Institutions for Military Education Services (past president) and the National Commission on Online Learning Benchmarking Study. She has also served as an external reviewer for several universities and participated in numerous self-studies, reports and evaluation visits for regional accreditors, the Department of Defense, state approving agencies and specialized accrediting organizations, and has made presentations at professional conferences and meetings on topics such as strategic partnerships, pricing models and innovative teaching best practices.

In 2019 she served on the Innovation subcommittee of the United States Department of Education’s negotiated rulemaking committee to develop proposed regulations related to several higher education practices and issues, including accreditation; distance learning and educational innovation, TEACH grants; and participation by faith-based educational entities. Later that year, Hancock was a featured speaker at South by Southwest.

Hancock has served on the board of directors for Special Olympics Michigan, the United Way Worldwide of Isabella County, Michigan, and the United Way of the Greater Capital Region.

In 2020, Hancock was appointed corporate secretary to the Greater Trenton board of directors. She also serves on the board of the New Jersey Association of State Colleges and Universities and the New Jersey Chamber of Commerce.
