= Karl Grossman =

American journalist

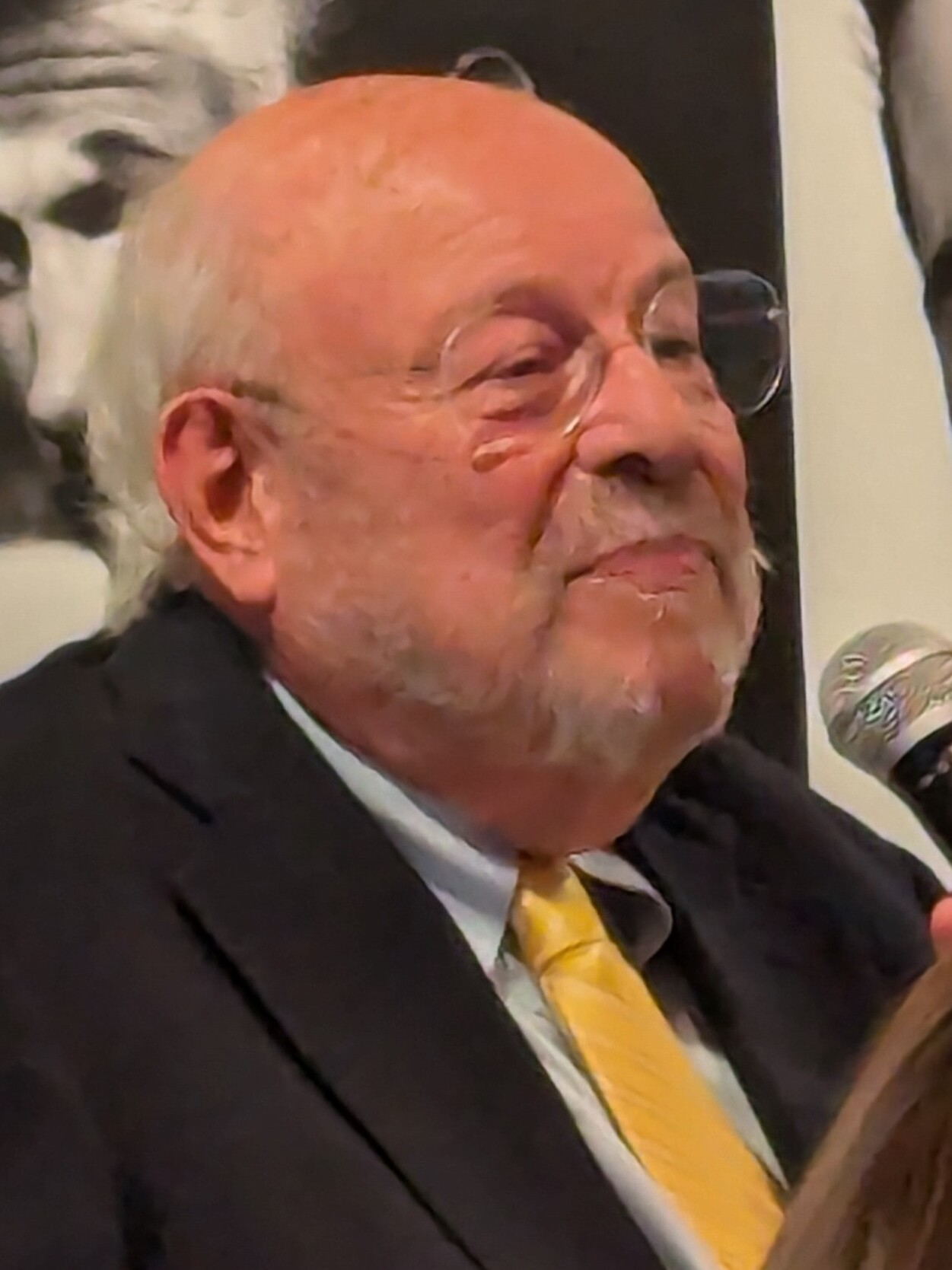
Grossman in 2025

Karl Grossman is an author, TV program host and professor emeritus of journalism at the State University of New York at Old Westbury. For 35 years, he has hosted the TV interview program Enviro Close-Up with Karl Grossman syndicated by Free Speech TV and broadcast on nearly 200 cable TV systems in 40 states, as well as satellite TV systems including Dish and DirecTV. He is the author of seven books.

Grossman attended Antioch College in Yellow Springs, Ohio, Adelphi-Suffolk College in Sayville, N.Y. and received a bachelor's degree with a social science concentration from Empire State College of the State University of New York. He is also the recipient of a master's degree in media studies from The New School for Social Research in New York City.

In 2024, he received the Horace Mann Award from the Antioch College Alumni Association for his work through the decades doing investigative journalism.

== Bibliography ==
=== Books ===
- Cover Up: What You Are Not Supposed to Know About Nuclear Power (1980)
- The Poison Conspiracy (1982)
- Nicaragua: America's New Vietnam? (1984)
- Power Crazy:Is LILCO Turning Shoreham Into America's Chernobyl? (1986)
- The Wrong Stuff: The Space Program's Nuclear Threat to Our Planet (1997)
- Weapons in Space (2001)
- "Cold War Long Island" (2021)
