= Richard P. Nathan =

American academic and writer (1935–2021)

Richard P. Nathan (November 24, 1935 – September 12, 2021) was an American writer who was the director of the Rockefeller Institute of Government and the Distinguished Professor of Political Science and Public Policy at the State University of New York at Albany. Nathan has written and edited books on the implementation of domestic public program in the United States and on American federalism. Prior to coming to Albany, he was a professor at Princeton University, the Woodrow Wilson School of Public and International Affairs. He served in the federal government as assistant director of the Office of Management and Budget, deputy undersecretary for welfare reform of the U.S. Department of Health Education and Welfare (now Department of Health and Human Services), and associate director for program research for the National Advisory Commission on Civil Disorders (the Kerner Commission). He graduated from Brown University (BA) and Harvard University (MPA, PhD). Nathan died on September 12, 2021, at the age of 85.
