= James J. LeCleir =

United States Air Force general

James J. LeCleir was a major general in the United States Air Force.

== Early life ==
LeCleir was born in Chippewa Falls, Wisconsin, in 1941. He attended Empire State College and Troy State University.

== Career ==
LeCleir originally enlisted in the Air Force in 1960. He was commissioned an officer the following year. Later he served in the Vietnam War and attended the Air Command and Staff College, the Industrial College of the Armed Forces, and the Air War College. In 1985 he was given command of the 834th Airlift Division and in 1991 was given command of the Inter-American Defense College. His retirement was effective as of July 1, 1992.

Awards he has received include the Defense Superior Service Medal, the Legion of Merit with oak leaf cluster, the Distinguished Flying Cross, the Defense Meritorious Service Medal, the Meritorious Service Medal with three oak leaf clusters, the Air Medal with two silver oak leaf clusters, and the Parachutist Badge.
