= Kathy Muehlemann =

American abstract painter (1950–2026)

Hypnotic Flight by Kathy Muehlemann, 1986, oil on linen, Honolulu Museum of Art

Kathy Muehlemann (February 9, 1950 – July 9, 2026) was an American abstract painter.

== Early life and education ==
Muehlemann was born in Austin, Texas, on February 9, 1950. She earned a B.F.A. from State University of New York, Empire State College in 1978. Muehlemann also studied fresco painting in Italy.

== Artistic career ==
Muehlemann was chair of the Art Department and professor of art at Randolph College.

The artist described her style as "metaphoric abstraction". It consists of an allover deployment of geometric images, often suggesting celestial objects, as in Hypnotic Flight, from the collection of the Honolulu Museum of Art. The Ackland Art Museum (Chapel Hill, NC), the Albright–Knox Art Gallery (Buffalo, NY), the Cleveland Museum of Art, the Grey Art Gallery (New York City), the Honolulu Museum of Art, the Maier Museum of Art (Lynchburg, VA), the Milwaukee Art Museum, the Museum of Contemporary Art (Miami, FL), the Nelson-Atkins Museum of Art (Kansas City, MO), and The Phillips Collection (Washington, D.C.) are among the public collections holding works by Muehlemann.

== Personal life and death ==
Her husband, Jim Muehlemann is also an artist and professor at Randolph College. She died on July 9, 2026, at the age of 76.
