= County and City Hall =

Building in Buffalo, New York, US

- U.S. National Register of Historic Places
- New York State Register of Historic Places
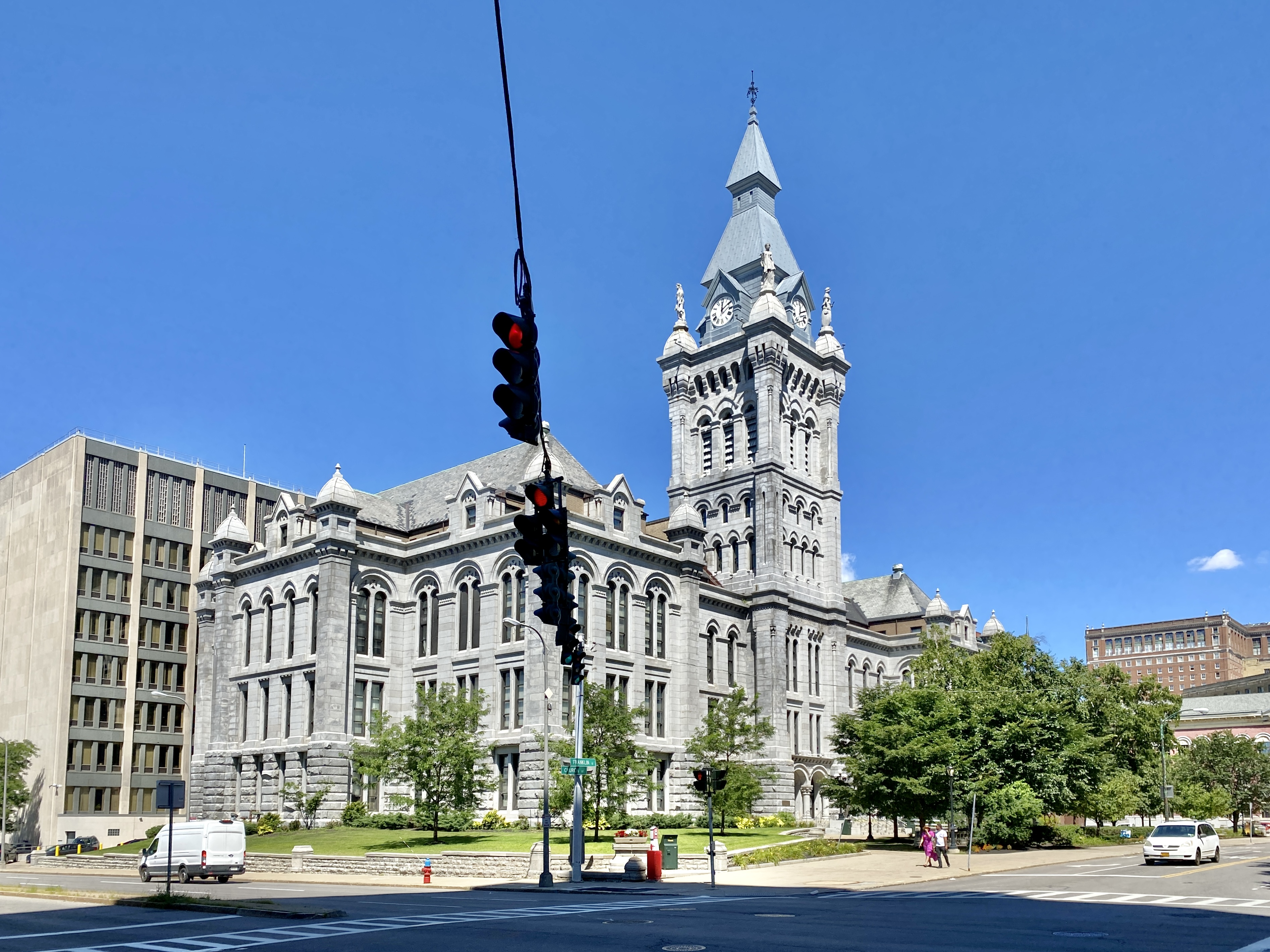
- Interactive map showing the County and City Hall, Buffalo
- Location: 100 Franklin St., Buffalo, New York
- Coordinates: 42°53′3″N 78°52′42″W
- Area: 3 acres (1.2 ha)
- Built: 1871–1875
- Architect: A. J. Warner & Company
- NRHP reference No.: 76001216
- NYSRHP No.: 02940.002979

Significant dates
- Added to NRHP: May 24, 1976
- Designated NYSRHP: June 23, 1980

County and City Hall, also known as Old Erie County Hall, is a historic city hall and courthouse building located at Buffalo in Erie County, New York. It is a monumental granite structure designed by Rochester architect Andrew Jackson Warner and constructed between 1871 and 1875, with its cornerstone being laid on June 24, 1872. The building has four floors and features a 270-foot high clock tower.

The County and City Hall building originally held offices for the City of Buffalo and Erie County. City offices moved to the Buffalo City Hall as it was being constructed starting in 1929, and the building now houses Erie County court offices and records.

It was listed on the National Register of Historic Places, maintained by the National Park Service of the U.S. Department of the Interior in 1976. It is located within the Joseph Ellicott Historic District.

== Gallery ==
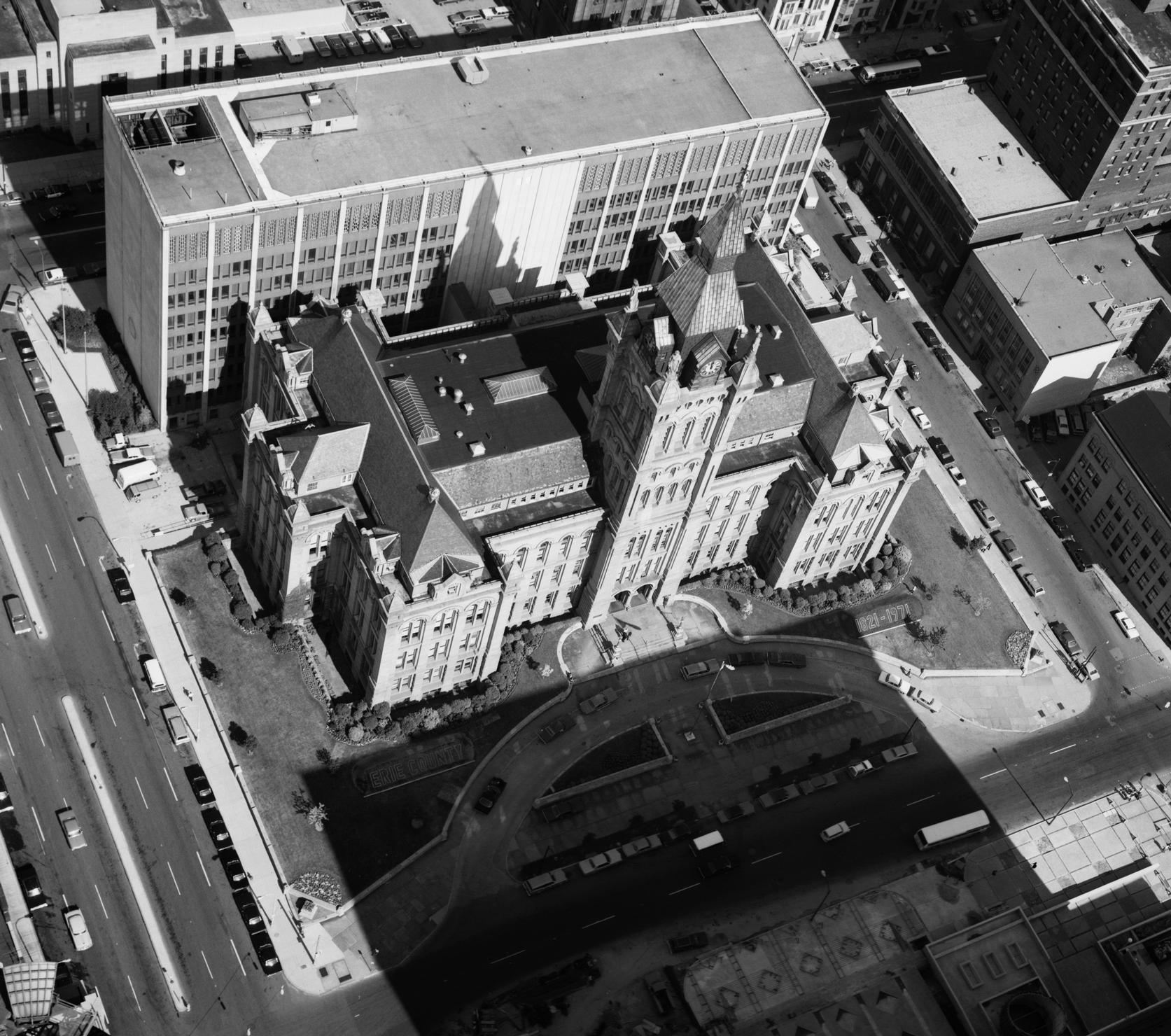
Aerial view, July 1971

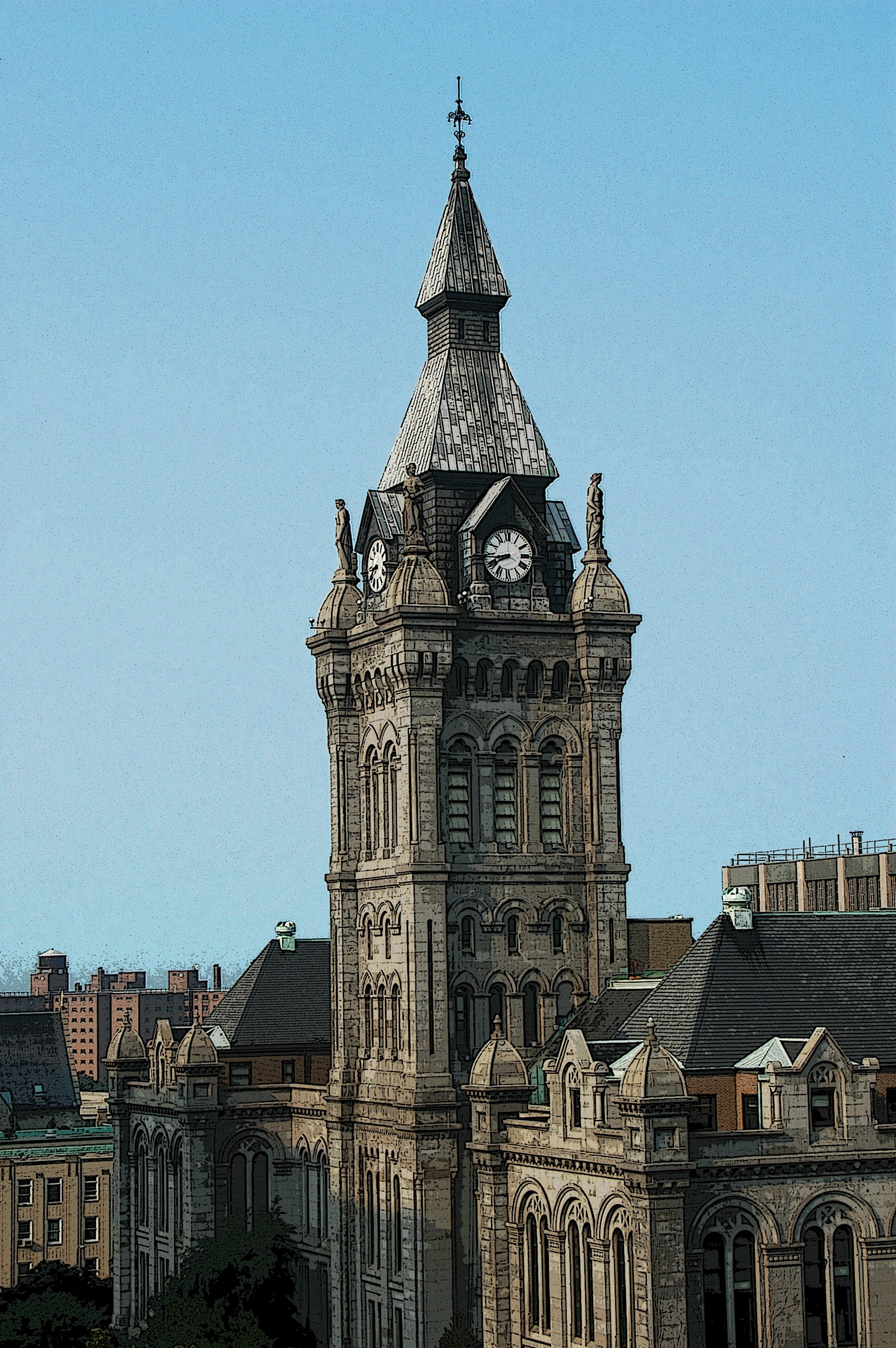
Tower detail, July 2005

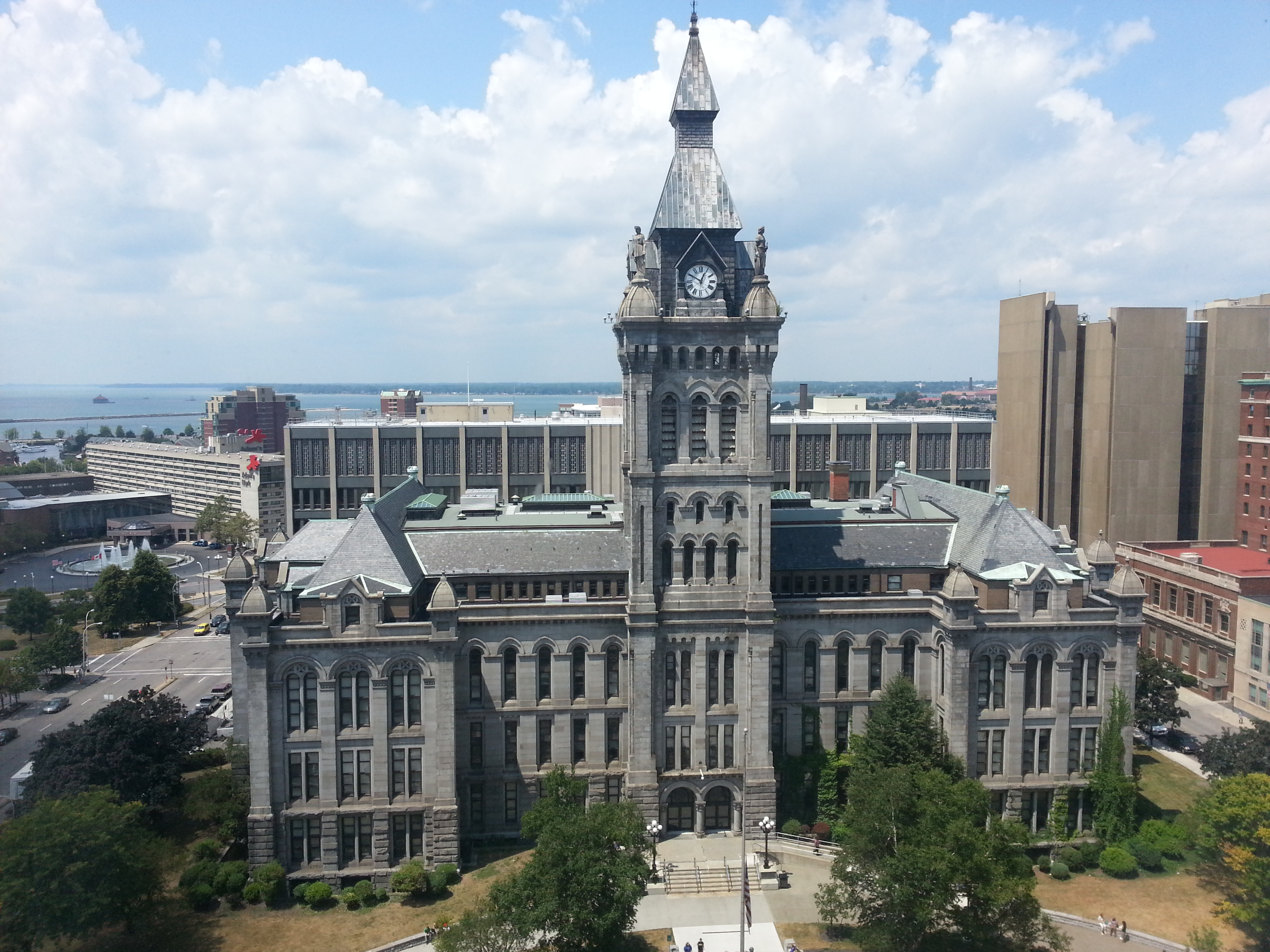
July 2012

== See also ==
- List of tallest buildings in Buffalo, New York

Preceded by Buffalo Psychiatric Center – Administration Building	Tallest building in Buffalo; 1876–1912; 82m	Succeeded by Electric Tower Building
