= Thomas A. Bartlett =

American academic

8th Chancellor of the State University of New York
- In office 1994–1996
- Preceded by: D. Bruce Johnstone
- Succeeded by: John W. Ryan

9th Chancellor of the Oregon University System
- In office 1989–1994
- Preceded by: William E. Davis
- Succeeded by: Joseph Cox

2nd Chancellor of the University of Alabama System
- In office 1982–1987
- Preceded by: Joseph F. Volker
- Succeeded by: Philip E. Austin

1st President of the Association of American Universities
- In office 1977–1982
- Succeeded by: Robert M. Rosenzweig

11th President of Colgate University
- In office 1969–1977
- Preceded by: Vincent MacDowell Barnett Jr.
- Succeeded by: George D. Langdon, Jr.

4th President of American University in Cairo
- In office 1963–1969
- Preceded by: Raymond F. McLain
- Succeeded by: Christopher Thoron

Personal details
- Born: March 24, 1930 (age 96) Salem, Oregon, United States
- Spouse: Mary (Molly) Louise Bixby (1954)
- Education: Willamette University; Stanford University (AB, 1951); Oxford University (MA); Stanford University (PhD, 1959)

Thomas Alva Bartlett (born August 20, 1930) is an American educator who is most notable for having served as president of several universities and university systems.

Bartlett was born in Salem, Oregon, and was youngest of three sons of Cleave Bartlett, an auditor-bookkeeper and real estate broker, and the former Alma Hanson, a housewife. In 1947, he graduated from Salem High School. He attended Willamette University for two years, where he joined Beta Theta Pi fraternity, before transferring to Stanford University, where he was elected to Phi Beta Kappa society. After graduating in 1951 with a bachelor's degree in political science, he attended Oxford University as a Rhodes Scholar, earning a master's degree. In 1959 he was awarded a Ph.D. degree from Stanford University. While still in graduate school, he was recruited to join the United States Permanent Mission to the United Nations to work on Arab-Israeli relations. From, there, he became the president of the American University in Cairo.

From 1969 to 1977, he assumed the presidency of Colgate University as well as the chancellorships of the University of Alabama System and the Oregon State System of Higher Education from the 1970s to the 1980s. He also served as president of the Association of American Universities. He was called out of a brief retirement to head the State University of New York System in 1994, but conflicts with George Pataki appointees on the university's board of trustees led to his resignation after just 17 months on the job.

After SUNY, he became chairman of the board of trustees of the United States-Japan Foundation, leaving after seven years to re-assume the Presidency of the American University in Cairo on an interim basis.

The Thomas A. Bartlett Chair of English at Colgate University is named after him.

Academic offices
Preceded by Raymond F. McLain	President of the American University in Cairo; 1963–1969	Succeeded by Christopher Thoron
Preceded by Vincent M. Barnett, Jr.	President of Colgate University; 1969–1977	Succeeded by George D. Langdon, Jr.
Preceded by New office	President of the Association of American Universities; 1977–1982	Succeeded by Robert M. Rosenzweig
Preceded by Joseph F. Volker	Chancellor of the University of Alabama System; 1982–1987	Succeeded by Philip E. Austin
Preceded by William E. Davis	Chancellor of the Oregon University System; 1989 – July, 1994	Succeeded by Joseph Cox
Preceded by Joseph C. Burke (acting)	Chancellor of the State University of New York; December 1, 1994 – June 30, 1996	Succeeded by John W. Ryan
Preceded by John D. Gerhart	Interim President of the American University in Cairo; 2002–2003	Succeeded by David D. Arnold
Non-profit organization positions
Preceded by William D. Eberle	Chairman of the Board of Trustees of the United States-Japan Foundation; 1994–2002	Succeeded by Thomas A. Johnson
