= Kristina M. Johnson =

American former government official, academic, engineer, and business executive

Kristina Johnson
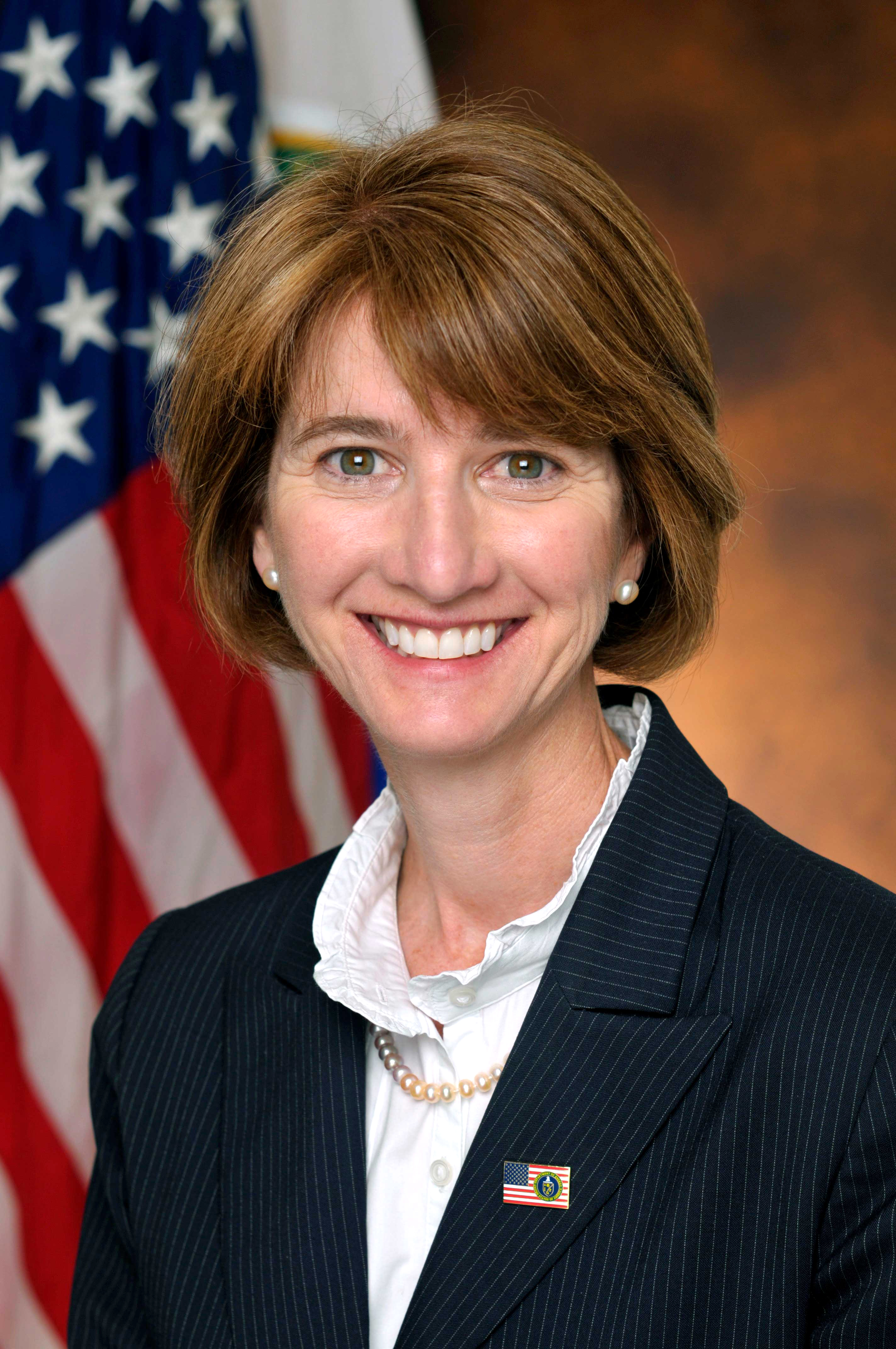
- Johnson in 2009

16th President of The Ohio State University
- In office August 24, 2020 – May 7, 2023
- Preceded by: Michael V. Drake
- Succeeded by: Walter E. Carter Jr.

13th Chancellor of the State University of New York
- In office September 2017 – June 2020
- Preceded by: Nancy L. Zimpher
- Succeeded by: Jim Malatras

12th Provost of Johns Hopkins University
- In office 2007–2009
- Preceded by: Steven Knapp
- Succeeded by: Lloyd B. Minor

7th Dean of the Pratt School of Engineering
- In office 1999–2007
- Preceded by: Earl H. Dowell
- Succeeded by: Robert L. Clark

Personal details
- Born: May 7, 1957 (age 69) St. Louis, Missouri, U.S.
- Spouse: Veronica Meinhard
- Education: Stanford University (BS, MS, PhD)
- Scientific career
- Awards: International Dennis Gabor Award (1993); National Academy of Engineering; National Inventors Hall of Fame; National Medal of Technology and Innovation
- Fields: Electrical engineering
- Workplaces: University of Colorado Boulder; Duke University; Johns Hopkins University; State University of New York; Ohio State University
- Thesis: Holographic Reciprocity Law Failure, with Applications to the 3-D Display of Medical Data (1984)
- Doctoral advisor: Joseph W. Goodman

Kristina M. Johnson (born May 7, 1957) is an American electrical engineer. She served as the 16th president of Ohio State University from 2020 to 2023 and as the 13th chancellor of the State University of New York from 2017 to 2020.

She has knowledge in the development of optoelectronic processing systems, 3-D imaging, and color-management systems. She was elected to the National Academy of Engineering.

== Early life and education ==
Johnson was born in St. Louis, Missouri, and grew up in Denver, Colorado. As a senior at Thomas Jefferson High School, she won the Denver City and Colorado State science fair competition, and placed second in the Physics division and a first place award from the Air Force at the International Science Fair for her project entitled, "Holographic Study of the Sporangiophore Phycomyces". Johnson grew up in a large, athletic family. She competed in Tae Kwon Do and learned to play lacrosse on the boys' lacrosse team. Her paternal grandfather, Charles W. Johnson, attended the Ohio State University and played football for the Buckeyes in 1896; Johnson would eventually become president there.

As an undergraduate at Stanford University, Johnson founded the women's club lacrosse team (now varsity) and played on the field hockey team, trying out for the U.S. Team in 1978. In 1979, Johnson was diagnosed with Hodgkin's disease and turned her focus to an academic career. Johnson received her B.S., M.S., and Ph.D. degrees in electrical engineering from Stanford, and was a postdoctoral fellow at Trinity College Dublin.

== Career ==
After the postdoctoral fellowship, Johnson was appointed assistant professor of electrical and computer engineering at the University of Colorado Boulder in 1985, where she co-founded the National Science Foundation (NSF) Engineering Research Center (ERC) for Optoelectronic Computing Systems and spun off several companies from her research laboratory including ColorLink, Inc which was later sold to RealD, responsible for the technology that helped re-launch the 3D movie industry. Additionally, she co-founded the Colorado Advanced Technology Institute Center of Excellence in Optoelectronics. In 1999, Johnson was appointed Dean of the School of Engineering at Duke University, which would be later named for distinguished alumnus, Edmund T. Pratt Jr., CEO emeritus of Pfizer Corporation.

In 2007, Johnson became the Senior Vice-President and Provost of Johns Hopkins University. In 2009, Johnson was appointed by President Obama as the Under Secretary of Energy for Energy and Environment at the United States Department of Energy with the unanimous consent of the United States Senate.

She is the founder of Enduring Hydro, a hydropower-focused energy firm. The firm has a joint venture with the New York City-based private equity firm I Squared Capital (called Cube Hydro Partners), that owns and operates 19 hydropower plants in the Eastern United States.

Johnson was elected a member of the National Academy of Engineering in 2016 for the development and deployment of liquid crystal on silicon display technologies, the basis for high-speed optoelectronic 3D imaging.

Johnson received the National Medal of Technology and Innovation for the contributions she made to optoelectronic imaging (3D imaging), and color technology. She founded ColorLink, which was made to improve 3D movie images. Johnson also advocated for women and groups in STEM that were underrepresented saying, "if you can see it, you can believe it".

Johnson has been a director of Minerals Technologies Inc., Nortel, Guidant Corporation, AES Corporation, and Boston Scientific. She is currently a member of the Board of Directors of Cisco Systems. In 2019, she resigned from the board of AES Corporation amid criticism of the company's pollution in Puerto Rico.

=== State University of New York ===
In April 2017, Johnson was appointed chancellor of the 64-school State University of New York, assuming the role in September. On June 3, 2020, it was announced that Johnson would resign from her position at the State University of New York to become the next president of Ohio State University.

=== Ohio State University ===
Under her presidency at Ohio State, research spending increased by 42%, and faculty attrition was reversed. In addition, significant funds were raised for the university and scholarships increased.

In 2023, Johnson "shocked the Ohio State University community" when she resigned from her position as president "just halfway through her contract". According to The Columbus Dispatch, this was due to Johnson deciding "she could no longer work with Les Wexner and certain trustees who are loyal to him and who push for his interests". Sources told The Columbus Dispatch that "Johnson and university leaders agreed not to speak publicly about the details surrounding her resignation", and she was replaced by Walter E. Carter Jr. the following school year.

== Personal life ==
Johnson is married to Veronica Meinhard, Founder and President of Juniper Philanthropy Partners.

== Awards and honors ==
- 1993, first woman awarded the International Dennis Gabor Award for creativity in modern optics.
- 2003, Fellow of the IEEE "for contributions to optoelectronic processing systems and liquid crystal devices".
- 2004, Society of Women Engineers Achievement Award, the highest honor of the Society.
- 2008, John Fritz Medal.
- 2010, ABIE Award for Technical Leadership from the Anita Borg Institute.
- 2014, inducted into the Colorado Women's Hall of Fame.
- 2015, elected to the National Inventors Hall of Fame for her work developing polarization-control technologies.
- 2016, elected to the National Academy of Engineering.
- 2017, awarded an honorary doctorate by NUI Galway.
- 2021, received the IEEE Mildred Dresselhaus Medal, recognizing outstanding technical contributions in science and engineering of great impact.
- 2025, recipient of the National Medal of Technology and Innovation.

Academic offices
Preceded by Nancy L. Zimpher	13th Chancellor of the State University of New York; 2017 – 2020	Succeeded by Jim Malatras
Preceded by Michael V. Drake	16th President of Ohio State University; 2020 – 2023	Succeeded by Peter J. Mohler
Incumbent
