= William B. Hoyt =

American politician

William B. Hoyt II

Member of the New York State Assembly from the 144th district
- In office January 1, 1975 – March 25, 1992
- Preceded by: Albert J. Hausbeck
- Succeeded by: Sam Hoyt

Personal details
- Born: William Ballard Hoyt II; June 20, 1937
- Died: March 25, 1992 (aged 54) Albany, New York, U.S.
- Party: Democratic
- Spouse: Susan Curran
- Children: 4, including Sam
- Education: The Park School of Buffalo
- Alma mater: Hamilton College

William Ballard Hoyt II (June 20, 1937 – March 25, 1992) was an American politician from New York.

== Early life and education ==
He was born on June 20, 1937, the son of Capt. John Davidson Hill Hoyt (1898–1943), who served with the 307th Bomb Group, 372d Bombardment Squadron and was killed in a crash off the coast of Kauai, Hawaiian Islands. His paternal grandparents were William B. Hoyt, an executive with the Pierce-Arrow Motor Car Company and founder of The Cornell Daily Sun at Cornell University, and Esther Lapham (née Hill) Hoyt.

His aunt, Esther Hoyt, was the wife of Ansley Wilcox Sawyer, a nephew of Ansley Wilcox, a friend of Theodore Roosevelt whose home on Delaware Avenue was the site of Roosevelt's inauguration following the assassination of President William McKinley.

Hoyt was educated at The Park School of Buffalo before attending Hamilton College in Clinton, New York.

== Career ==
After his graduation from Hamilton, Hoyt taught history for 11 years at his alma mater, the Park School, before entering politics. Hoyt entered politics as a Democrat, and was a member of the Buffalo Common Council from 1970 to 1974. He was a member of the New York State Assembly from 1975 until his death in 1992, sitting in the 181st, 182nd, 183rd, 184th, 185th, 186th, 187th, 188th and 189th New York State Legislatures.

In 1989, he ran on the Liberal Party line for Buffalo Mayor, but was defeated by incumbent James D. Griffin, who had defeated him in the Democratic primary.

== Personal life ==
Hoyt was married twice, secondly to Susan Curran. From his first marriage, he was the father of four children, including William "Sam" Ballard Hoyt III (b. 1962), who also served in the New York State Assembly. In 2011, Governor Andrew Cuomo appointed Sam to serve as a regional vice president of the state's economic development agency.

On March 25, 1992, he suffered a heart attack during a debate in the Assembly, and died soon after in Albany Medical Center. He was 54 years old.

=== Legacy ===
Hoyt Lake in Delaware Park in Buffalo is named after Hoyt.

New York State Assembly
Preceded by Albert J. Hausbeck	New York State Assembly; 144th District; 1975–1992	Succeeded by Sam Hoyt
