= Ita Aber =

American artist (1932–2025)

- Born: Ita Hershcovich; March 27, 1932; Montreal, Quebec, Canada
- Died: April 17, 2025 (aged 93); New York City, U.S.
- Education: Empire State College
- Known for: Textiles, conservation, curatorial

Ita Aber (née Hershcovich; March 27, 1932 – April 17, 2025) was a Canadian-born American feminist multimedia textile artist, art conservator, and curator.

== Life and career ==
Ita Aber was born in Montreal, Quebec, Canada as Ita Hershcovich to Fannie (née Zabitsky) and Tudick Hershcovich. Her grandparents were of German, Polish, Russian, and Romanian Bukhara ancestry.

Her first exposure to feminism was by her grandmother, an early suffragette in Canada, and her mother, who founded the Milk Fund of Canada. She took courses in Jewish history, archaeology, art, and textile conservation at Queen's College, Columbia University, the Jewish Theological Seminary, and New York University. She completed a bachelor's degree in Cultural Studies from Empire State College and carried out graduate-level studies at The Valentine Museum (Richmond, Virginia), and the Metropolitan Museum of Art, earning a master's degree equivalent in Jewish Art.

In 1964, Aber became politically active, specifically in the Reform Democratic movement. Through her early political involvement, she sought to abolish laws in New York restricting abortion. She helped found Women Strike for Peace, and also became active in the environmental movement, speaking out against the pollution in the Hudson River. At this time, she also became active in equal rights activism, and minority and elder rights.

Aber was a founding member of the New York Feminist Art Institute and the founder of the Pomegranate Guild of Judaic Needlework. Starting in 1972, she taught needlework at the Jewish Museum, the Cooper-Hewitt Museum and other venues throughout the eastern United States.

Aber's artistic-related archives are held at the Archives of American Art, with other archival collections being held by the National Museum of Women in the Arts. Her family's papers are held at Yeshiva University.

Aber died on April 17, 2025, at the age of 93.

== Exhibitions ==
- 2001: "55 Year Retrospective Exhibition", Broome Street Gallery
- 2007: "Ita B'Ita: Ita Aber in Her Time: 60 Years of Creativity and Innovation by Ita Aber", Yeshiva University Museum

== Bibliography ==
- The art of Judaic needlework: traditional and contemporary designs, Scribner, 1979, ISBN 978-0-684-16239-3;
- Art of Judaic Needlepoint, Simon & Schuster, 1982, ISBN 978-0-684-17684-0
- Ita H. Aber, Frann S. Addison, Katya Apekina, Beverly Auerbach, Tradition today: modern Judaica and folk art, Jewish Arts Foundation, 1990
