= Erick Johnson (artist) =

American contemporary artist

- Born: 1959 (age 66–67); San Francisco, CA
- Education: Milton Avery School for the Arts, Bard College; Empire State College
- Known for: Abstract Painting
- Website: https://erickjohnson.com

Erick Johnson (born 1959) is an American contemporary artist living and working in New York City. His primary media are oil painting, drawing and photography.

Johnson was born in San Francisco and grew up in Los Angeles, CA and New Jersey. He attended the School of Visual Arts and received his B.A. from Empire State College and his M.F.A. from the Milton Avery School of the Arts at Bard College.

Johnson's work has been featured in the New York Times, The Washington Post, Time Out New York, The New York Observer, Artcritical.com, The Brooklyn Rail, and artnet.

== Selected solo exhibitions ==
- 2022 - Chroma Chord: New Paintings by Erick Johnson, Kathryn Markel Fine Art, NYC
- 2021 - Double Take, Brattleboro Museum & Art Center, Brattleboro, VT
- 2018 - (Inside) Out: New Work by Erick Johnson, Gallery Neptune & Brown, Washington DC
- 2016 - Streets for Evermore, Gallery Neptune & Brown, Washington DC
- 2015 - Colorvane, IUCA+D Gallery, Indiana University, Columbus, IN
- 2012 - New Work, Heskin Contemporary, NYC
- 2010 - Parallelogram Paintings, Heskin Contemporary, NYC
- 2000 - Erick Johnson, Recent Paintings and Drawings, Salena Gallery, Long Island University, Brooklyn, NY

== Selected group exhibitions ==
- 2022 - Soho Artist History Walk, Pt 1, CITYarts, New York, NY
- 2021 - Odd Couple, Curated by Max Zlotsky Seiler, Kathryn Markel Fine Art, New York, NY
- 2020 - 10 X Relay, Indiana University J. Irwin Miller Architecture Program Gallery, Columbus, IN
- 2019 - You Are Not Alone, Casimir Effect, (Chashama space) 1022 Lexington Avenue, New York, NY
- 2019 - Double Vision: Artists who Instagram, The Teaching Gallery, Hudson Valley Community College, Troy, NY (co-curated with Janice Caswell)\
- 2018 - Erick Johnson/Malcolm Wright, Cynthia Reeves Gallery, The Barn at 28 Main St. Walpole NH
- 2017 - Double Vision: Artists who Instagram, LABspace Gallery, Hillsdale, NY (co-curated with Janice Caswell)
- 2016 - Machines of Paint and Other Materials, 72 Front Street, Brooklyn NY
- 2014 - Out of Bounds, Neptune Fine Art, Washington DC
- 2013 - Abstract Gambol, Heskin Contemporary, NYC
- 2013 - Interior Space: Small Scale Abstract Painting, Salena Gallery, Long Island University, Brooklyn, NY
- 2012 - Abstract Gambol, Heskin Contemporary, NYC
- 2011 - Double Vision, Geoffrey Young Gallery, Gt. Barrington, MA
- 2010 - Casheesh 4, Geoffrey Young Gallery, Gt. Barrington, MA
- 2008 - It's Gouache & Gouache Only, Andrea Meislin Gallery, NYC
- 2006 - Exquisite Abstraction, Whitespace Gallery, Atlanta, GA
- 2005 - NY Loves LV, Dust Gallery, Las Vegas, NV (curated by Lisa Stefanelli)
- 2002 - Jump, The Painting Center, NYC (curated by Ross Neher)
- 2001 - The Hard & the Soft, Thomas Korzelius Gallery, NYC (curated by Claire Jervert)

== Grants & fellowships ==
- 2019 - Vermont Studio Center Fellowship
- 2004 - Artist in Residence, St. Mary's College, MD
- 2001 - Virginia Center for the Creative Arts Fellowship
- 1988 - Vermont Studio Center Fellowship
- 1982 - Foreign Study Scholarship, Cleveland Institute of Art/ Lacoste, France
