= Jerome B. Komisar =

American economist

Jerome Bertram Komisar (born 1937) is an American economist and academic administrator most notable for serving as President of the University of Alaska.

== Biography ==
Komisar was born in Brooklyn, New York. He received a bachelor's degree in economics from New York University in 1957, master's and Ph.D degrees in economics from Columbia University in 1959 and 1968, respectively. His dissertation committee included two winners of the Nobel Prize in economics, Gary Becker and Jacob Mincer. He began at the City College of New York in 1959 and moved to Hamilton College in 1961. In 1966, he joined Binghamton University, where he held a number of faculty and administrative positions, most notably acting Chancellor in 1987 and 1988.

In 1990, he assumed the Presidency of the University of Alaska system, serving in that role for eight years.

== Selected publications ==
- Komisar, Jerome B. (1959), The Economic Factors Affecting the Development of the American Shoe Factory, New York: Columbia University, OCLC 56144104
- Komisar, Jerome B.; Gambs, John S. (1968) [1964], Economics and Man, Homewood, Illinois: R. D. Irwin, Inc., OCLC 517436
- Komisar, Jerome B. (2012) [2012], The Last Believer, Jerome B. Komisar, ISBN 978-0985858407

Academic offices
Preceded by Stanley K. Coffman	President (acting) of the State University of New York at New Paltz; July 1979 – June 1980	Succeeded by Alice Chandler
Preceded by Clifton R. Wharton, Jr.	Chancellor (acting) of the State University of New York; February 1, 1987 – July 31, 1988	Succeeded by D. Bruce Johnstone
Preceded by Donald D. O'Dowd	President of the University of Alaska; August 1990 – June 30, 1998	Succeeded by Wendy Redman (acting)
