= Empire State University =

Public university in Saratoga Springs, New York, US

Coordinates: 43.0777°N 73.7826°W

State University of New York, Empire State University
- Former name: Empire State College
- Type: Public university
- Established: 1971; 55 years ago
- Parent institution: State University of New York
- President: Lisa Vollendorf
- Faculty: 160 full time and 490 part time
- Students: 11,404 (fall 2025)
- Undergraduates: 9,039 (fall 2025)
- Postgraduates: 2,365 (fall 2025)
- Location: Saratoga Springs, New York, U.S.
- Colors: Orange, blue, black
- Nickname: Bluebirds
- Mascot: Blue the Bluebird
- Website: sunyempire.edu

The State University of New York, Empire State University (also referred to as Empire State University or SUNY Empire) is a public university headquartered in Saratoga Springs, New York. It is part of the State University of New York (SUNY) system.

Empire State University is a multi-site institution offering associate, bachelor's, master's, and doctoral degrees, as well as distance degrees through the Center for Distance Learning. The university has approximately 12,000 undergraduate students and has an acceptance rate of 51%. The university is accredited by the Middle States Commission on Higher Education.

== History ==
Empire State College was designed by then SUNY Chancellor Ernest Boyer in a document titled "Prospectus for a New University College." In 1971, Ernest L. Boyer, chancellor of the State University of New York, conceived a new college for the state's public university: a college dedicated to adult student-centered education. Empire State College was designed removing impediments to access such as time, location, institutional processes, and curricular customs. In this design, students would individually define their academic needs, purposes, and efforts. The college would be flexible in supporting them through its faculty, policies, and procedures, to achieve college-level learning.

=== Mascot ===
In 2020, Empire State University named its first-ever mascot, Blue the Bluebird. A campus-wide vote took place and Blue the Bluebird beat out other finalists, Cam the Chameleon and Van the Vanguard. Students, faculty, staff, and alumni cast 9,922 total votes in the finals. The bluebird is New York's state bird.

=== Presidents ===
Name	Tenure
James W. Hall	1971–1998
Jane Altes (interim*)	January 1998 – September 2000
Joseph B. Moore	September 2000 – June 2007
Kimberly Cline (acting*)	June 2007 – October 2007
Joyce Elliott (interim*)	October 2007 – July 31, 2008
Alan Davis	August 1, 2008 – July 31, 2012
Meg Benke (acting*)	August 1, 2012 – May 8, 2013
Merodie A. Hancock	May 9, 2013 – March 3, 2018
Mitchell Nesler (Officer-in-Charge*)	March 3, 2018 – July 14, 2019
Jim Malatras	July 15, 2019 – August 30, 2020
Beth Berlin (Officer-in-Charge*)	August 31, 2020 – June 30, 2022
Lisa Vollendorf	July 1, 2022 – present
*title designates acting/interim leaders

== Academics ==
Undergraduate demographics as of Fall 2023
Race and ethnicity	Total
White	49%
Black	15%
Hispanic	15%
Unknown	13%
Asian	3%
Two or more races	3%
Economic diversity
Low-income (Note: The percentage of students who received an income-based federal Pell grant intended for low-income students.)	38%
Affluent (Note: The percentage of students who are a part of the American middle class at the bare minimum.)	62%

The university offers undergraduate and graduate distance education, extensive transfers of credits from other universities, prior-learning assessment for knowledge gained through independent studies, standardized evaluations, and the opportunity to design one's own degree with an academic advisor or mentor.

=== Rankings ===
Academic rankings

Regional
- U.S. News & World Report: 151-165

In 2024, U.S. News & World Report ranked Empire State University No.151-165 out of 171 Regional Universities North, No.57-60 in Top Public Schools, tied at No.392 in Nursing, and No.161 in Top Performers on Social Mobility.

== Notable alumni ==
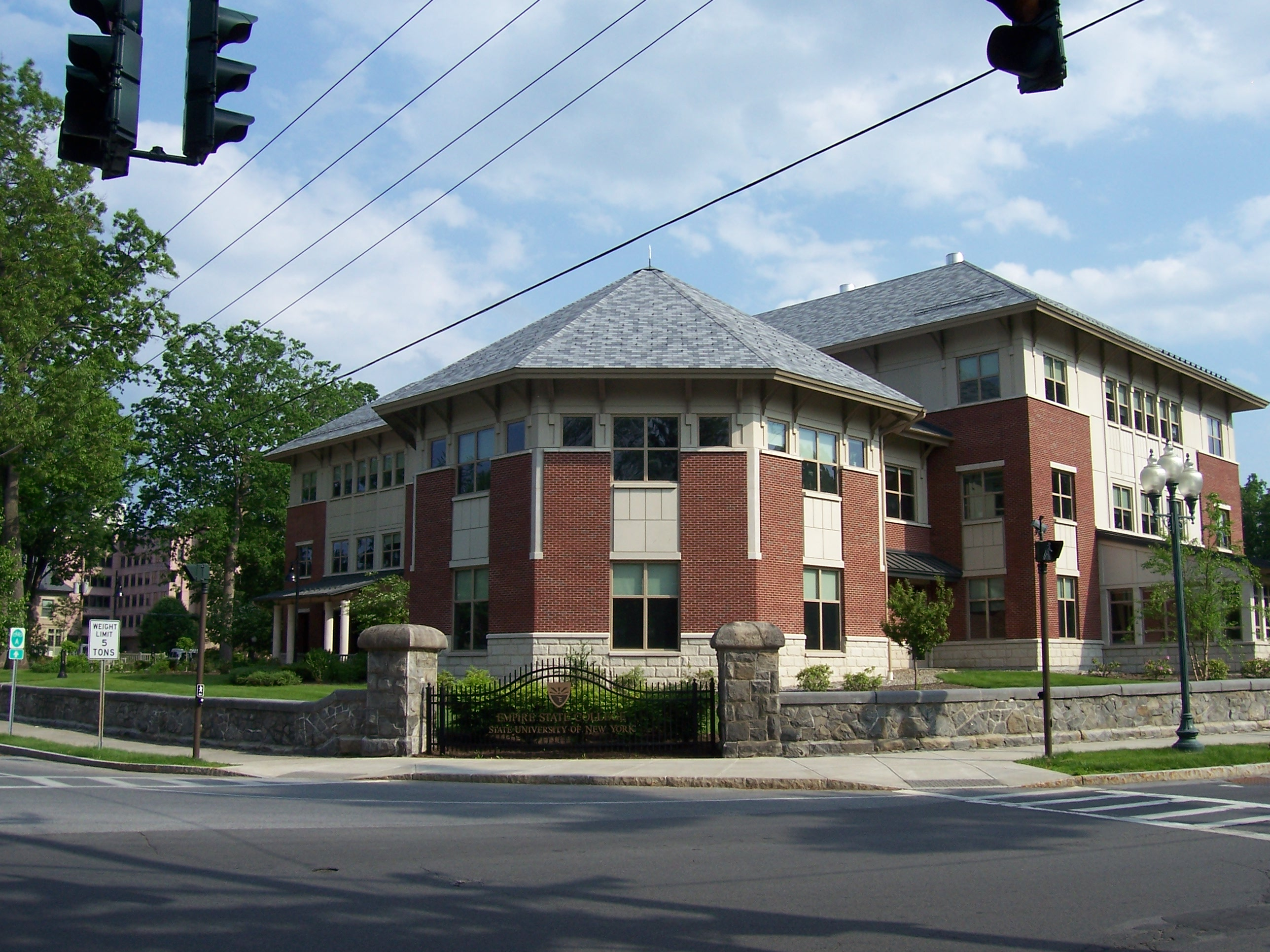
The Coordinating Center at Saratoga Springs, New York

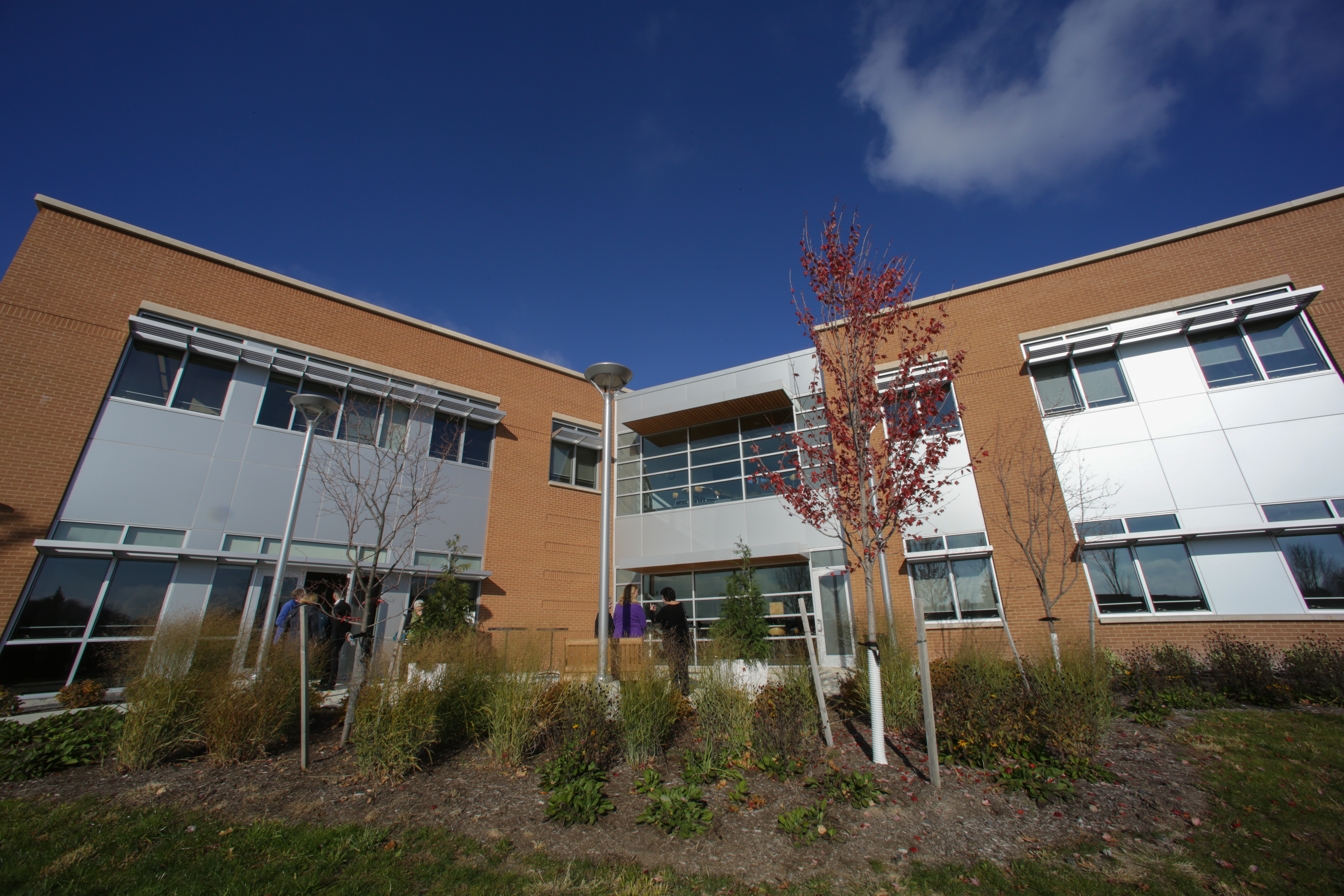
Rochester, New York location

- Stephen Chan (American politician), NY State Senator
- Amy Arbus (2003), photographer
- Ita Aber, artist and curator
- Kenny Barron (1978), jazz pianist
- Ginny Brown-Waite (1976), former member U.S. House of Representatives
- Herman Benson (1975), Union Reformer
- Dawoud Bey (1990), photographer
- Frank Enea (1993), musician and composer
- Alice Fulton (1978), English professor, winner of the 1991 MacArthur Fellows Program Award, commonly referred to as the "genius" award, for poetry
- Susan Gibney, actress
- Deborah Gregory (1986), author of Cheetah Girls
- Karl Grossman (1976), professor of journalism SUNY Old Westbury, author, TV program host
- Bob Herbert (1988), The New York Times columnist
- Rich Hickey (1992), creator of Clojure programming language
- Erick Johnson, American contemporary artist
- Bernard Kerik (2002), former Commissioner of the New York Police Department
- James J. LeCleir (1974), U.S. Air Force Major General
- Steven McLaughlin, member of the New York State Assembly, County Executive of Rensselaer County, New York
- Kathy Muehlemann (1978), abstract painter & professor
- Elliott Murphy (1988), singer-songwriter & author
- Mae Ngai (1992) historian, Columbia University
- Alan Rachins (1974), television actor
- Mark J.F. Schroeder (1982), New York Commissioner of Motor Vehicles
- Norman Seabrook, former president Of New York City Correction Officers' Benevolent Association (1995–2016), convicted on corruption charges
- James M. Sheppard (1999), chief of the Rochester Police Department and member of the Monroe County Legislature
- Randall Terry (2006), anti-abortion activist and Constitution Party nominee for the 2024 United States presidential election
- Melba Tolliver (1998), journalist, reporter, and news anchor
- Herb Trimpe (1997), artist on "The Incredible Hulk" comic series
- Bob Watson (1999), major league baseball player and executive
- David C. Webster, member of the Maine House of Representatives
- Reggie Witherspoon (1995), college basketball coach

== See also ==
- University of New York, Tirana
- University of New York, Prague
- SUNY Learning Network
- Non-traditional student
