= Nancy L. Zimpher =

American educator and university chancellor (born 1946)

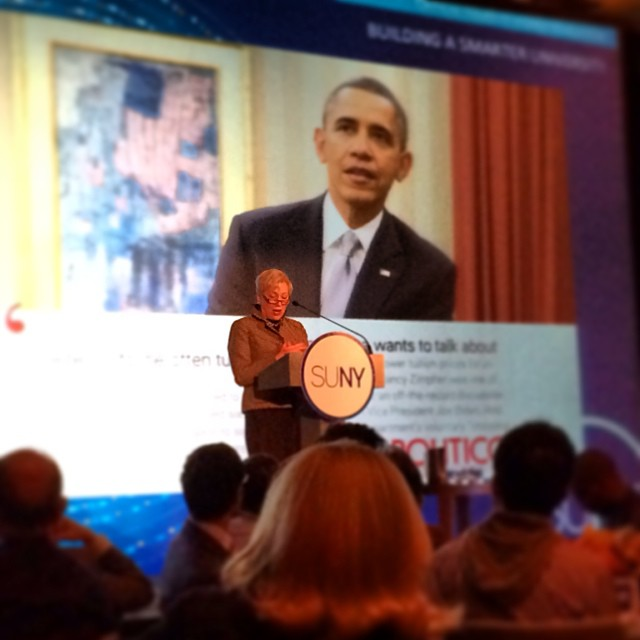
- Zimpher in 2013

12th Chancellor of the State University of New York
- In office June 1, 2009 – September 4, 2017
- Appointed by: David Paterson
- Preceded by: John J. O’Connor (Officer in Charge)
- Succeeded by: Kristina M. Johnson

Personal details
- Born: October 29, 1946 (age 79) Gallipolis, Ohio, U.S.
- Spouse: Kenneth R. Howey
- Education: Ohio State University
- Profession: Educator
- Institutions: Ohio State University; University of Wisconsin–Milwaukee; University of Cincinnati; State University of New York
- Salary: $545,400
- Website: Office of the Chancellor

Nancy Lusk Zimpher (born October 29, 1946) is an American educator, state university leader, and former Chancellor of the State University of New York (SUNY). Prior to her service at SUNY, Zimpher was a dean and professor of education at Ohio State University (where she had earned her bachelors, master's and doctoral degrees); then Chancellor of the University of Wisconsin–Milwaukee between 1998 and 2003; and President of the University of Cincinnati from 2003 through May 2009. Zimpher was the first woman to serve as Chancellor of SUNY, UWM's first woman chancellor, and UC's first female president. Zimpher is a native of the village of Gallipolis in southern Ohio.

== Administrative career ==
=== University of Wisconsin–Milwaukee ===
At UWM (where she was the first female chancellor of that university), Zimpher created the now-defunct "Milwaukee Idea", a deliberately derivative variation on the historical Wisconsin Idea that "the University's boundaries are the State's boundaries", with a strategic plan that tied UWM, with its faculty knowledge base and research facilities, to the economic health and strength of the Greater Milwaukee area, and raised the profile of UWM in the region vis-a-vis crosstown rival Marquette University.

=== University of Cincinnati ===
At UC, she worked to eliminate the previous divisions among the colleges (such as by creating a single university commencement) and continuously championed UC|21, an academic plan which redefined UC as a "new urban research university" for the 21st century. It has also positioned Cincinnati as a candidate for AAU status. Her work was complicated by controversy over her ousting of longtime basketball coach Bob Huggins. Shortly after her arrival at UC, Huggins had been arrested for driving under the influence. This arrest, combined with the poor performance of Huggins' players in the classroom, were among many factors that led Zimpher to force Huggins to resign in 2005.

=== State University of New York ===
Soon after taking over at SUNY, Zimpher promised to visit all 64 campuses in the sprawling system—the largest university system in the nation under a single governing board.

Eight months after being sworn in, Zimpher had to deal with another athletic controversy, this time at Binghamton University. After a rash of incidents involving the school's basketball team, Zimpher ordered an audit of Binghamton's athletic department—to be overseen by the SUNY board of trustees, not Binghamton. The resulting report tallied what the New York Times described as "a litany of transgressions, including lowered admission standards and changed grades." In its wake, Binghamton president Lois B. DeFleur retired in July, athletic director Joel Thirer resigned and basketball coach Kevin Broadus, was placed on paid administrative leave and ultimately stripped of coaching duties.

Zimpher eventually assigned SUNY’s interim provost, David K. Lavallee, to lead an overall effort for the SUNY system to ensure that academics remain the highest priority; and Charles R. Westgate, a professor in the Department of Electrical and Computer Engineering at Binghamton, as a special adviser for academics and athletics for the SUNY system: moves some critics of the over-emphasis on athletics decried as insufficient.

Zimpher advocated the use of systemness to begin overhauling SUNY in her January 9, 2012 State of the University address.

On May 31, 2016, Zimpher announced her intention to step down as SUNY chancellor on June 30, 2017.

== Family ==
Zimpher's husband is Kenneth R. Howey, Senior Fellow at the Rockefeller Institute of Government, a public policy research institute at the University at Albany. She was also married to Craig Zimpher, Director of OSU residence hall Scott House, while studying for their advanced degrees at The Ohio State University from c: 1968 through the early 1970s.

== Key works ==
- Percy, Stephen L., Nancy L. Zimpher, and Mary Jane Brukardt, eds. 2006. Creating a New Kind of University: Institutionalizing Community-University Engagement. Bolton, MA: Anker Publications. ISBN 9781882982882
- Zimpher, Nancy L., and Kenneth R. Howey, eds. 2004. University Leadership in Urban School Renewal. Westport, CT: Praeger. ISBN 9780275980955
- Zimpher, Nancy L., Stephen L. Percy, and Mary Jane Brukardt. 2002. A Time for Boldness: A Story of Institutional Change. Bolton, MA: Anker Publications. ISBN 9781882982547

Academic offices
Preceded by John H. Schroeder	Chancellor of the University of Wisconsin–Milwaukee; 1998–2003	Succeeded by Carlos E. Santiago
Preceded by Joseph A. Steger	President of the University of Cincinnati; October 2003 – April 2009	Succeeded by Monica Rimai (Interim)
Preceded by John J. O'Connor (Officer in Charge)	Chancellor of the State University of New York; June 2009 – September 2017	Succeeded by Kristina M. Johnson
