= Buffalo Psychiatric Center – Administration Building =

1871 building in Buffalo, New York

Coordinates: 42.92905°N 78.88041°W

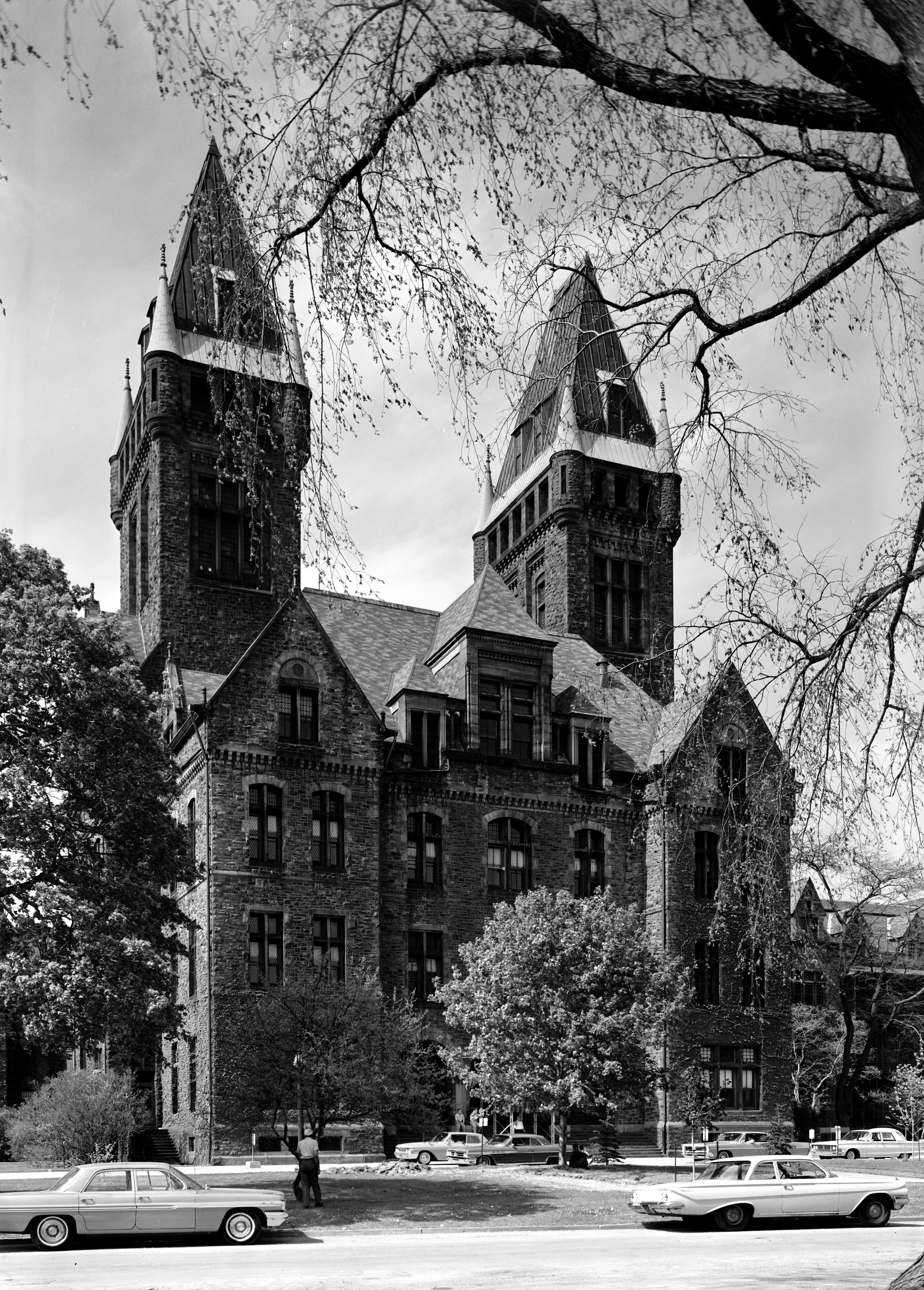
The H. H. Richardson Complex – Administration Building, in 1965

The Former Administration Building of the Buffalo Psychiatric Center is the central building of the Richardson Olmsted Complex in Buffalo, New York.

The administration building has monumental, medieval, double, identical towers (each 185 feet tall), each with four corner turrets and dramatically steep copper roofs punctuated with dormered windows, all of which gave the administration building an imposing appearance. These great paired towers make the Richardson Olmsted Complex one of the most striking public buildings in America. The towers were never intended to house any functions and to this day are unfinished. This building once housed officers and their families on the second and third floors, and a large chapel occupied space on the fourth floor.

Today, Buffalo Psychiatric Center services are located in the nearby Strozzi Building and the former administration building is currently being redeveloped as the home of Hotel Henry and the future Buffalo Architecture Center.

== See also ==
- List of tallest buildings in Buffalo, New York

Preceded by Unknown	Tallest building in Buffalo; 1871–1876; 49m	Succeeded by Erie County Hall
