= Joseph C. Burke =

American educator and academic (1932–2018)

Joseph C. Burke (1932 – August 3, 2018) was an American educator and academic best known for serving as President of the State University of New York at Plattsburgh and Acting Chancellor of the State University of New York.

Burke earned a bachelor's degree in History and Philosophy from Bellarmine College and Master's and Ph.D. degrees in Legal History from Indiana University Bloomington.

Burke began his career at Ohio Wesleyan University and Duquesne University. He assumed the position of Academic Vice President Loyola College (Montreal) and negotiated its merger with Sir George Williams University to form Concordia University in 1974. He then moved to the State University of New York at Plattsburgh, serving as its President for twelve years. Burke became Provost and Vice Chancellor for Academic Affairs of SUNY in 1986 and was asked to assume the chancellorship when his predecessor resigned due to failing health.

Burke was a Senior Fellow with the Rockefeller Institute's Higher Education Program until his death in 2018.

SUNY Plattsburgh's Burke Gallery is named after him.

Academic offices
Preceded by George W. Angell	President of the State University of New York at Plattsburgh; 1974–1986	Succeeded by Charles O. Warren
Preceded by D. Bruce Johnstone	Chancellor (Acting) of the State University of New York; March 1, 1994 – November 30, 1994	Succeeded by Thomas A. Bartlett
