= American Association of State Colleges and Universities =

- Formation: 1961
- Headquarters: Washington, D.C.
- Location: United States
- Members: over 500
- President: Charles L. Welch
- Website: aascu.org

The American Association of State Colleges and Universities (AASCU) is an organization of state-supported colleges and universities that offer degree programs leading to bachelor's, master's or doctoral degrees. AASCU grew out of the Association of Teacher Education Institutions that had been organized in 1961 to serve public comprehensive institutions. Most of the original member institutions began as single-purpose institutions, most commonly normal schools.

In 2009, the association chose its first African American and first woman president: Muriel A. Howard, and she led the association until January 2018.

Since January 2024, the association has been led by Charles L. Welch, former president of the Arkansas State University System.

== Purpose ==
The AASCU has a four-fold purpose:

- To promote appreciation and support for public higher education and the distinctive contributions of our member colleges and universities;
- To analyze public policy, and to advocate for member institutions and the students they serve;
- To provide policy leadership and program support to strengthen academic quality, promote access and inclusion, and facilitate educational innovation; and
- To create professional development opportunities for institutional leaders, especially presidents, chancellors and their spouses.

== Membership ==
There are over 300 member institutions of AASCU. AASCU represents the sector of 500 regional public universities.

== See also ==
- List of higher education associations and organizations in the United States
