= Rockefeller Institute of Government =

Political research institute

The Rockefeller Institute of Government
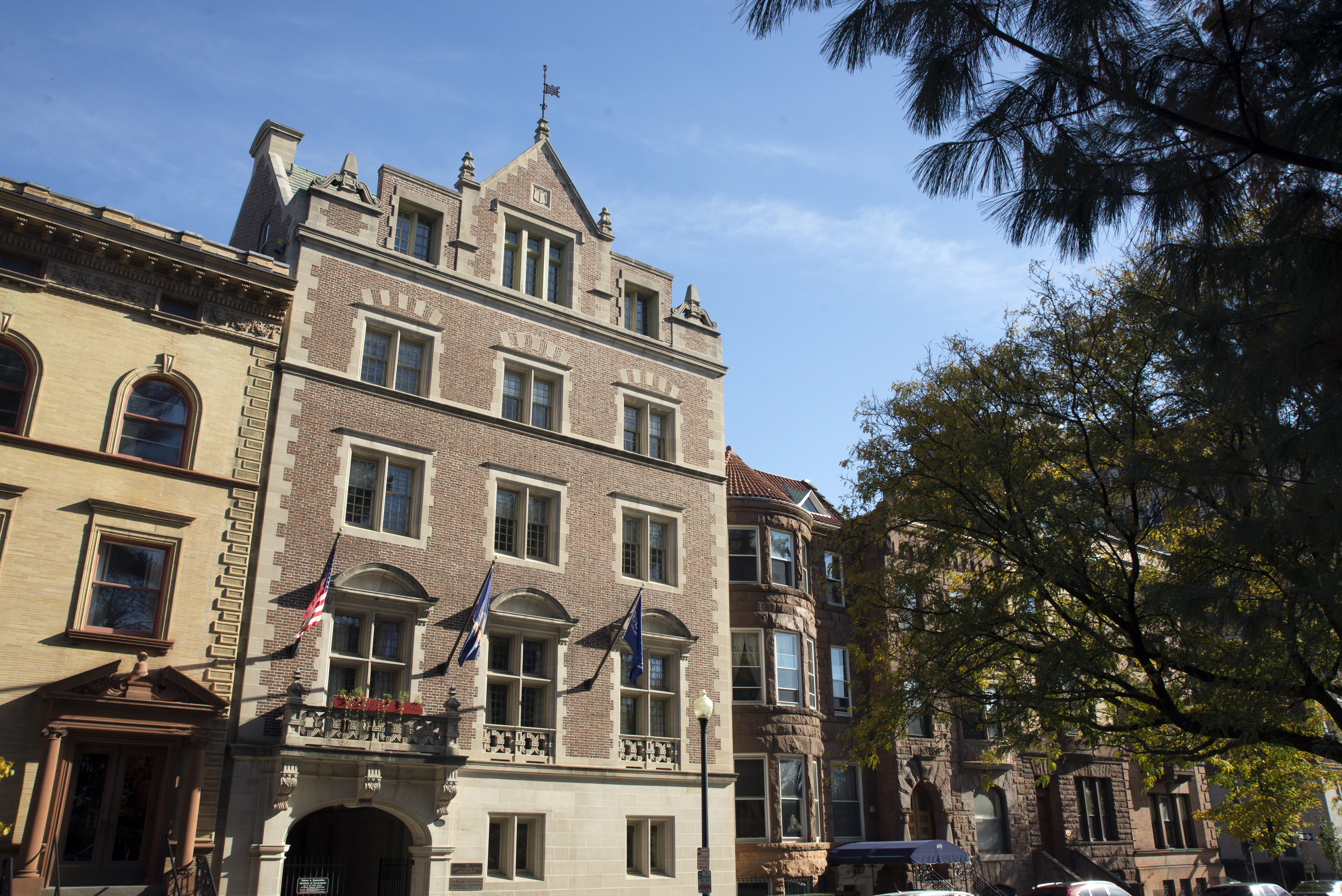
- Type: Think tank
- Location: 411 State Street, Albany, New York 12203
- Services: Research and analysis in economic development, education, federalism, fiscal policy, government reform, health, and state and local government; open data services.
- Executive Director of Research: Laura Schultz
- Parent organization: State University of New York
- Website: www.rockinst.org

The Rockefeller Institute of Government is the public policy research arm of the State University of New York. The institute conducts nonpartisan research and analysis on state and local government and finance, American federalism, public management, and New York State issues. The institute is located in Albany, New York, United States.

== History ==
The Rockefeller Institute was founded in 1981, at the same time as the Nelson A. Rockefeller College of Public Affairs and Policy at the University at Albany, as a proposal by then-SUNY chancellor Clifton Wharton to acknowledge the role that Governor Rockefeller played in expanding the state and city universities.

Warren Ilchman was the first director of the Institute until 1987, at which time David Andersen was named interim director. In 1989, Richard P. Nathan became the institute's second director. Prior to coming to Albany, Nathan was a professor at Princeton University, worked at the Brookings Institution, and served in the first Nixon administration. From 2005 to 2009, the Institute had two co-directors, Richard Nathan and Thomas Gais. On October 23, 2009, Richard Nathan retired, after leading the Institute for 20 years. On July 1, 2010, Thomas Gais became the third director.

== Research and programs ==
The primary research areas of the Rockefeller Institute include economic development, education, federalism, fiscal policy, and healthy policy. The Institute runs the Empire State Fellows Program to prepare participants for future work in the New York State government.
