= D. Bruce Johnstone =

Chancellor, State University of New York
- In office August 1, 1988 – February 28, 1994
- Preceded by: Jerome B. Komisar (Acting)
- Succeeded by: Joseph C. Burke (Acting)

President, Buffalo State College
- In office August 16, 1979 – July 31, 1988
- Preceded by: E.K. Fretwell, Jr.
- Succeeded by: F.C. Richardson

Personal details
- Born: January 13, 1941 (age 85) Minneapolis, Minnesota, U.S.
- Spouse: Gail Johnstone
- Children: 2
- Education: Harvard University; University of Minnesota
- Profession: Higher education Academic administration

Donald Bruce Johnstone, also known as D. Bruce Johnstone, (born January 13, 1941) is an American educator who served as Chancellor of the State University of New York (SUNY), headquartered in Albany, New York; and President of Buffalo State College, in Buffalo, New York. Johnstone is also Professor Emeritus at the University at Buffalo (UB). He was named SUNY Chancellor Emeritus in 2014.

== Background and education ==
Johnstone was born in Minneapolis, Minnesota, and earned degrees in Economics and Education at Harvard University. He also earned a Ph.D. in Higher Education at the University of Minnesota in 1969. He is married to wife, Gail, and has two adult children, a son and daughter.

=== Honorary degrees ===
Johnstone also holds honorary doctoral degrees from American institutions of higher education, including:

- D'Youville College;
- Towson State College; and
- California State University at San Diego.

== Career ==
In Westport, Connecticut, Johnstone worked as a high school economics and American history teacher.

After working as an administrative assistant to former United States Senator Walter F. Mondale and a project specialist at the Ford Foundation, Johnstone took academic and administrative positions at the University of Pennsylvania.

At the University of Pennsylvania, he was Executive Assistant to the President and Vice President for Administration.

In 1979, Johnstone became the President of Buffalo State College.

Johnstone was chosen to head the State University of New York System (SUNY) in 1988.

Johnstone resigned as Chancellor in 1994 after experiencing pancreatic cancer, and later, returned to education at University at Buffalo.

=== Accomplishments as SUNY Chancellor ===
Johnstone was the first SUNY System president to be named as a SUNY chancellor.

As SUNY Chancellor, Johnstone oversaw the largest and most comprehensive university system in the United States. In 1993, the SUNY System included 64 college campuses with an enrollment of more than 400,000 students, as well as a budget of $4.5 billion.

Johnstone commissioned an influential support to spur lawmakers to enable the SUNY System to adapt to the changing needs of New York State, specifically, the need to educate older and more ethnically diverse students and to supply the State healthcare system with an ample supply of healthcare workers.

=== International endeavors ===
Johnstone currently serves as Distinguished Service Professor Emeritus of Higher and Comparative Education and Director of the International Comparative Higher Education Finance and Accessibility Project at UB. The Project examines the worldwide responsibility change in higher education costs from taxpayers and governments to students and their parents. The Project has been active in sponsoring or co-sponsoring higher education financing conferences, internationally, in Moscow, Russia; Prague, Czech Republic; Dar es Salaam, Tanzania; Nairobi, Kenya; Wuhan, China; and Arusha, Tanzania.

Johnstone has been a consultant to the World Bank in Kenya, Romania, and Morocco. For Kenya, he headed a team on university finance reform there.

Following 2007, Johnstone has been an Erasmus Mundus lecturer at the Universities of Tampere, Finland and Oslo, Norway, speaking on topics in higher education administration. During 2007-2008, he was also the Distinguished Scholar Leader of the Fulbright New Century Scholars Program. This group is composed of 32 international and 12 American scholars who examine access to higher education through international viewpoints.

== Professional interests and scholarship ==
Johnstone's interests include economics and finance in higher education. Additional interests are in the areas of student finance and loans; governance and leadership in higher education; international comparative higher education finance and governance; federal and state policies for higher education; college-level learning in high school; and learning productivity.

Johnstone has authored several books and many articles, mostly in the area of student finance. He has also written or edited books, book chapters, articles, and/or monographs. Other authorship topics have included student financial assistance policy; international comparative higher education finance; learning productivity; higher education's financial condition; and system governance.

=== Books ===
- Johnstone, D.B., & Marcucci, P. (2010). Financing higher education in international perspective: Who pays? Who should pay? Baltimore, MD: The Johns Hopkins University Press.
- Johnstone, D.B, d’Ambrosio, M., & Yakoboski, P. (Eds.), (2010). Higher education in a global society. New York, NY/Northampton, MA: Edward Elgar Publishing.
- Johnstone, D.B. (2006). Financing higher education: Cost-sharing in international perspective. Boston, MA: Boston College Center for International Higher Education; and Rotterdam, Holland: Sense Publishers.
- Texeira, P., Johnstone, B., Rosa, M.J., & Vossensteyn, H. (Eds.), (2006). Cost-sharing and accessibility in Western higher education: A fairer deal? Dordrecht, The Netherlands: Springer.
- Johnstone, D.B. (1986). Sharing the costs of higher education: Student financial assistance in the United Kingdom, the Federal Republic of Germany, France, Sweden, and the United States. New York, NY: College Entrance Examination Board.
- Johnstone, D.B. (1972). New patterns for college lending: Income contingent loans. New York, NY, & London, England: Columbia University Press.

Academic offices
Preceded by E. K. Fretwell, Jr.	President of Buffalo State College; August 16, 1979 – July 31, 1988	Succeeded by F.C. Richardson
Preceded by Jerome B. Komisar (Acting)	Chancellor of the State University of New York; August 1, 1988 – February 28, 1994	Succeeded by Joseph C. Burke (Acting)
