= Margaret Ely Webb =

American illustrator

- Born: March 27, 1877; Urbana, Illinois
- Died: January 12, 1965 (aged 87); Santa Barbara, California
- Known for: Illustrator
- Notable work: The House of Prayer by Florence Converse
- Movement: Arts and Crafts

Margaret Ely Webb (1877–1965) was an American illustrator, printmaker, and bookplate artist. She was part of the Arts and Crafts movement of the early 1900s.

== Early life ==
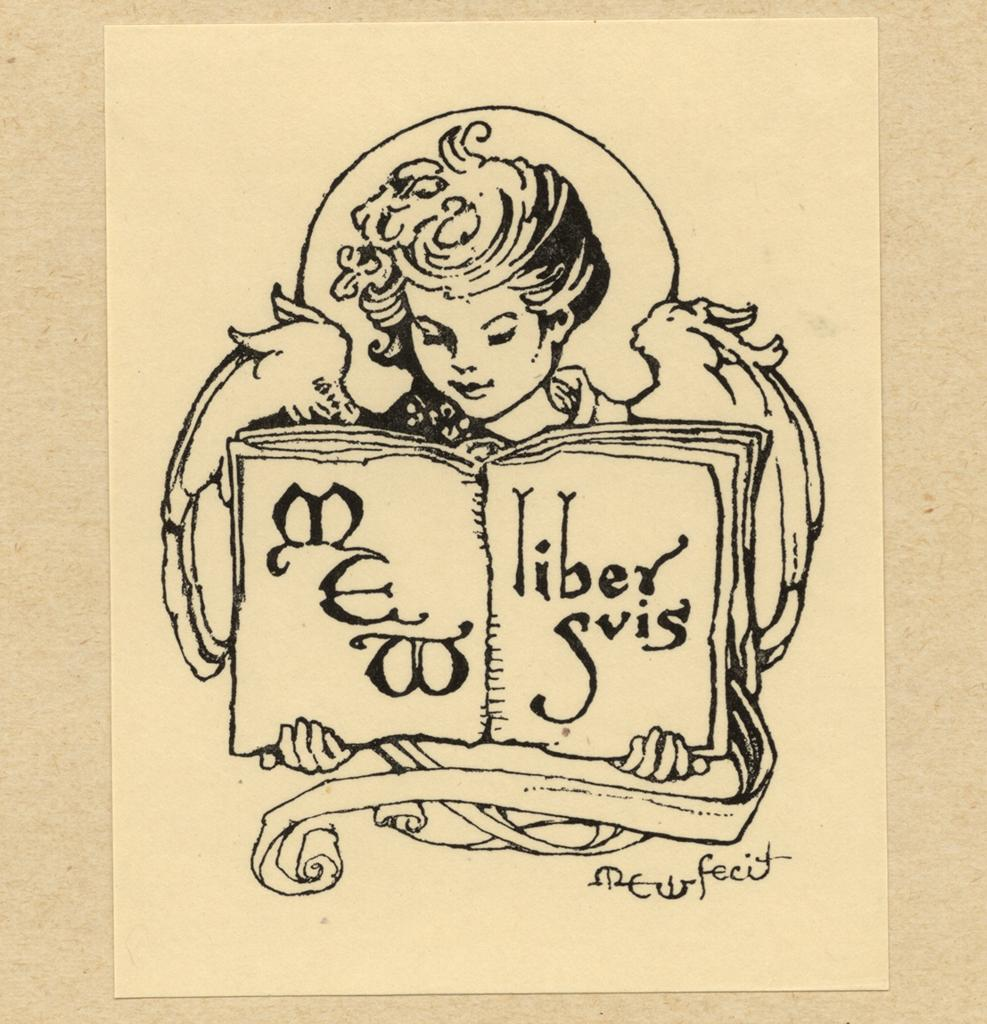
One of Webb's self-made bookplates.

Margaret Ely Webb was born in Urbana, Illinois, on March 27, 1877, the daughter of Mary Emeline Gregory and John Burkitt Webb. She was the eldest (and only daughter) of five other siblings. Her father died in 1912 and in 1917 Webb's mother married Charles Albert Storke, a prominent citizen of Santa Barbara, California and mayor from 1898 to 1901.

Webb was encouraged to read and draw as a child by her mother: "Indeed, as soon as her mother realized that the one thing she was going to do was to draw she made up her mind to see that the child's imagination got its proper food, and every sort of good imaginative literature and picture was quietly paid where she would stumble upon it." As a child, she drew on anything she could find.

At age thirteen she started regular drawing lessons with Lucy Tye Fenner. At sixteen Webb studied in New York at the Art Students' League but because of an illness it wasn't until three years later that she started regular study at Cooper Union and then later at the Arts Students' League. Her teachers at the League included J. Alden Weir, Kenyon Cox and John Henry Twachtman. Webb said "the Composition Class under Mr. Cox was both illuminating and inspiring." Her early works were produced for St. Nicholas Magazine, The School Journal and The Primary School, The Century, Youth Companion and The Churchman. She lived in Boston and New Jersey, before settling in Santa Barbara in 1922.

== Illustration ==
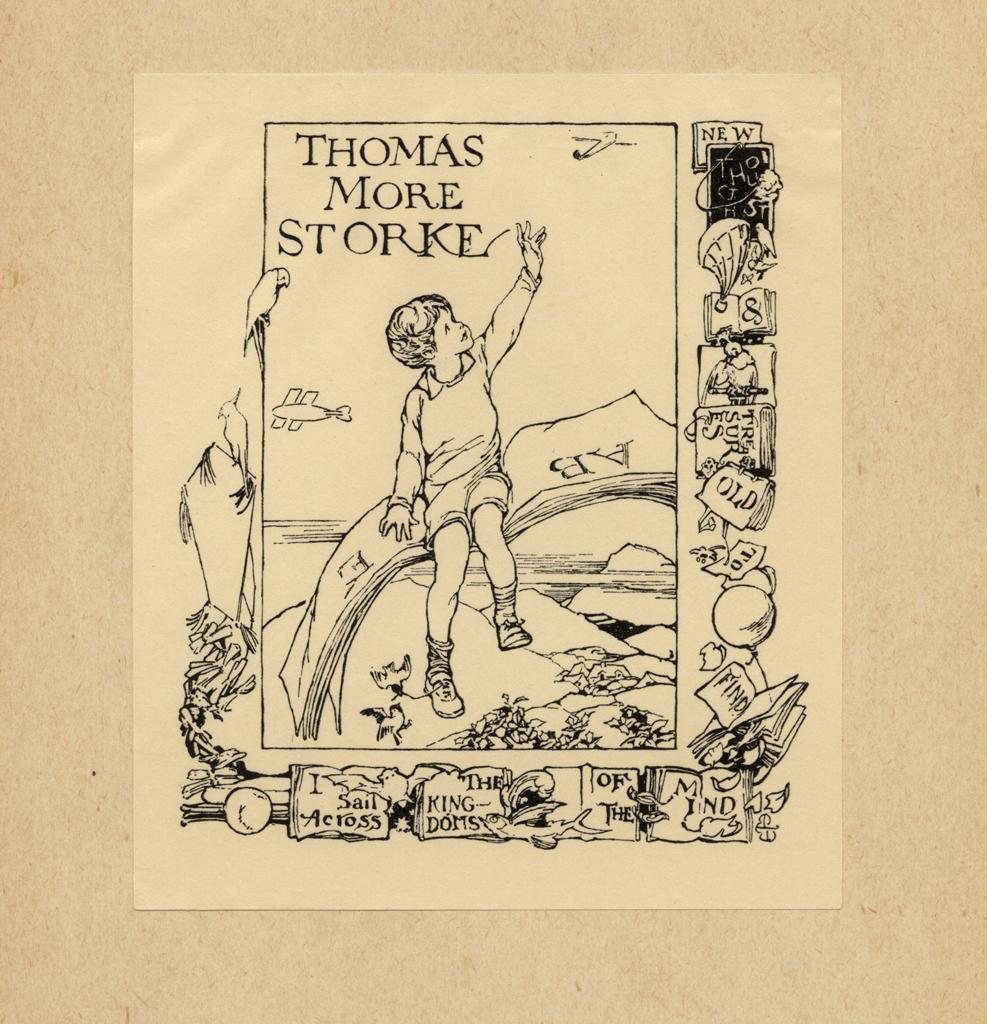
A bookplate by Webb for her stepbrother, Thomas Storke.

Webb was an important figure in the Arts and Crafts movement of the early 1900s. She was known for her intricate, pen-and-ink bookplate designs. According to the Santa Barbara Independent, "one critic, writing in August 1908, confessed that the beauty of Webb’s plates had shattered his prejudice against women artists." Webb created bookplates for notable Santa Barbarans, including her step-brother, Thomas M. Storke.

She made the illustrations for Florence Converse's The House of Prayer (1908) which was reprinted numerous times as well as the Aldine Readers and Primer series. Unfortunately due to ill-health extra designs were added from other artists like Sarah Noble Ives.

In the 1940s, Webb took up woodblock printing as a medium for bookplates. She also painted watercolors and oils. Webb is primarily remembered for her work as an illustrator of children's literature

=== Memberships and awards ===
- Member of the American Artists Professional League.
- Member of the American Society of Bookplate Designers and Collectors
- Member of the Museum of Comparative Oology
- Vice President of the California Bookplate Society
- In 1923, Ninth Annual Exhibit of Contemporary Bookplates for a bookplate for a child
- In 1954, Webb's bookplate art was honored by the Dutch Bookplate Society.

== Personal life ==
Webb was also a talented musician and a horticulturalist. The gardens at her home in Santa Barbara were admired throughout the South Coast.

== Death and legacy ==
In 1950, Webb sold her longtime home on West Micheltorena Street and moved to Mountain Drive, where she converted the garage into her studio. She died in 1965. A collection of her watercolors of wildflowers was given to the Santa Barbara Museum of Natural History, and her illustrations would eventually become part of the collections of the Library of Congress and the British Museum.

=== Bookplates ===
Some of Margaret Ely Webb's bookplates are held in the William Augustus Brewer Bookplate Collection at the University of Delaware.

Bookplates by Margaret Ely Webb

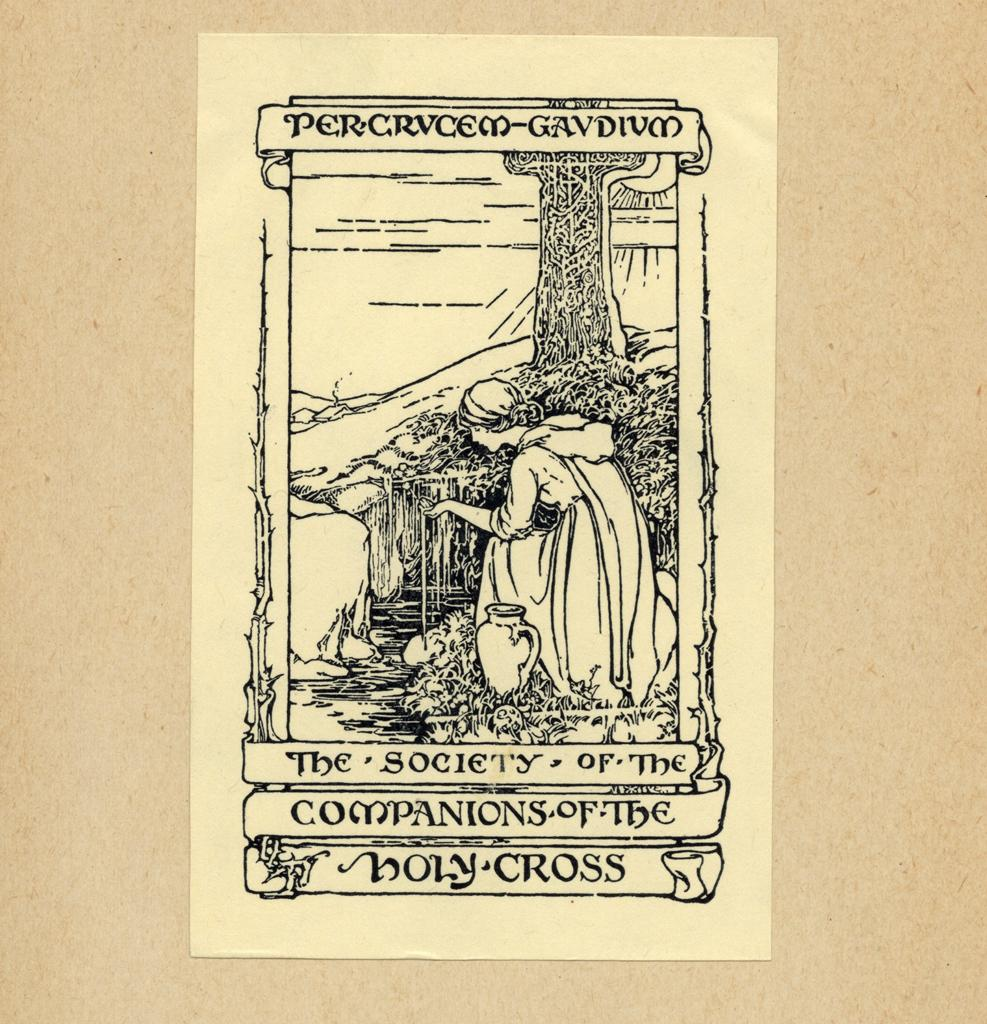
Bookplate for the Society of the Companions of the Holy Cross

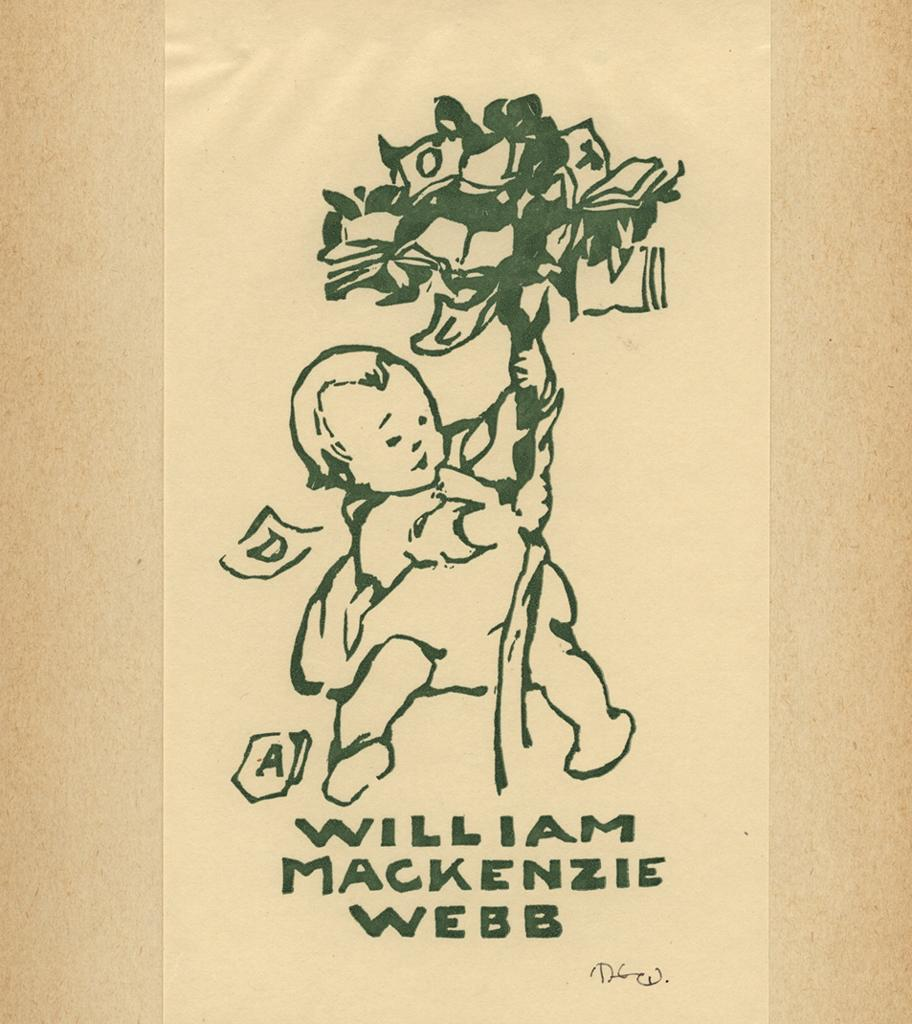
Bookplate for relative William Mackenzie Webb

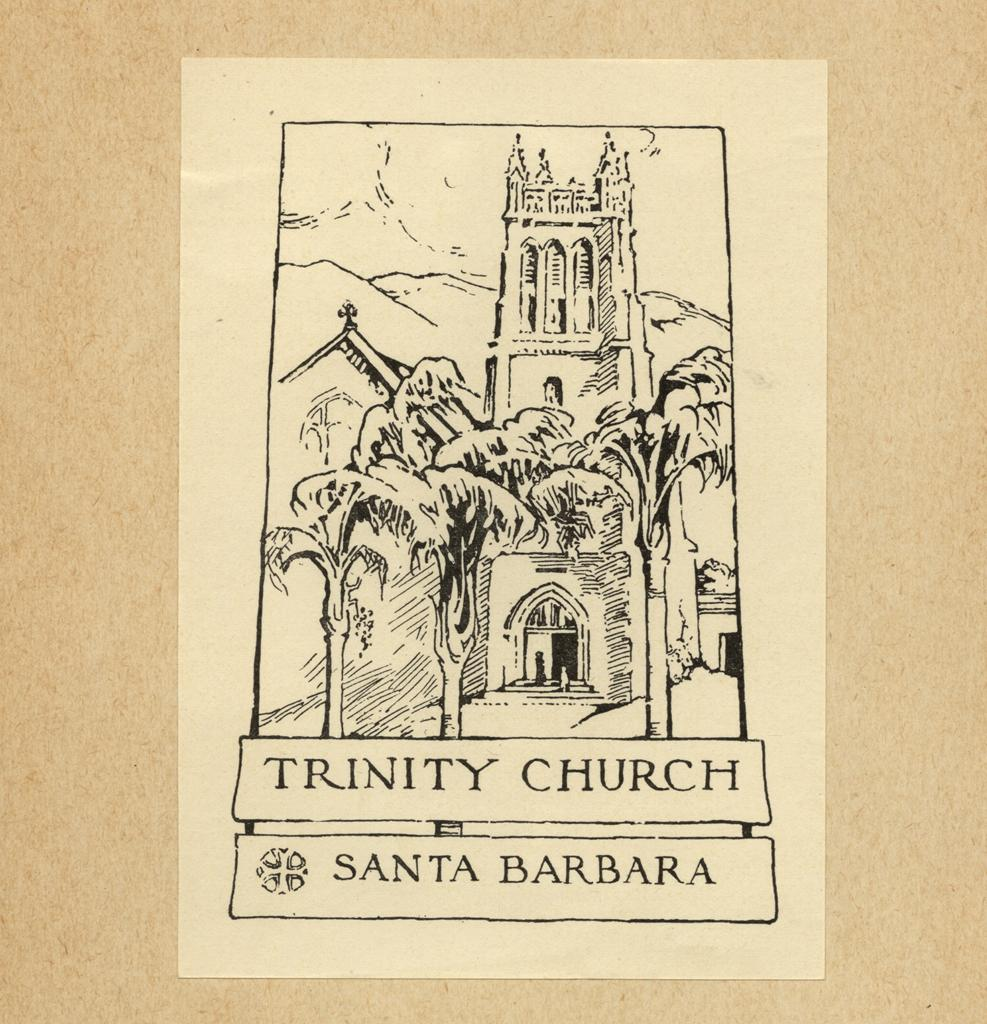
Bookplate for Trinity Church, Santa Barbara

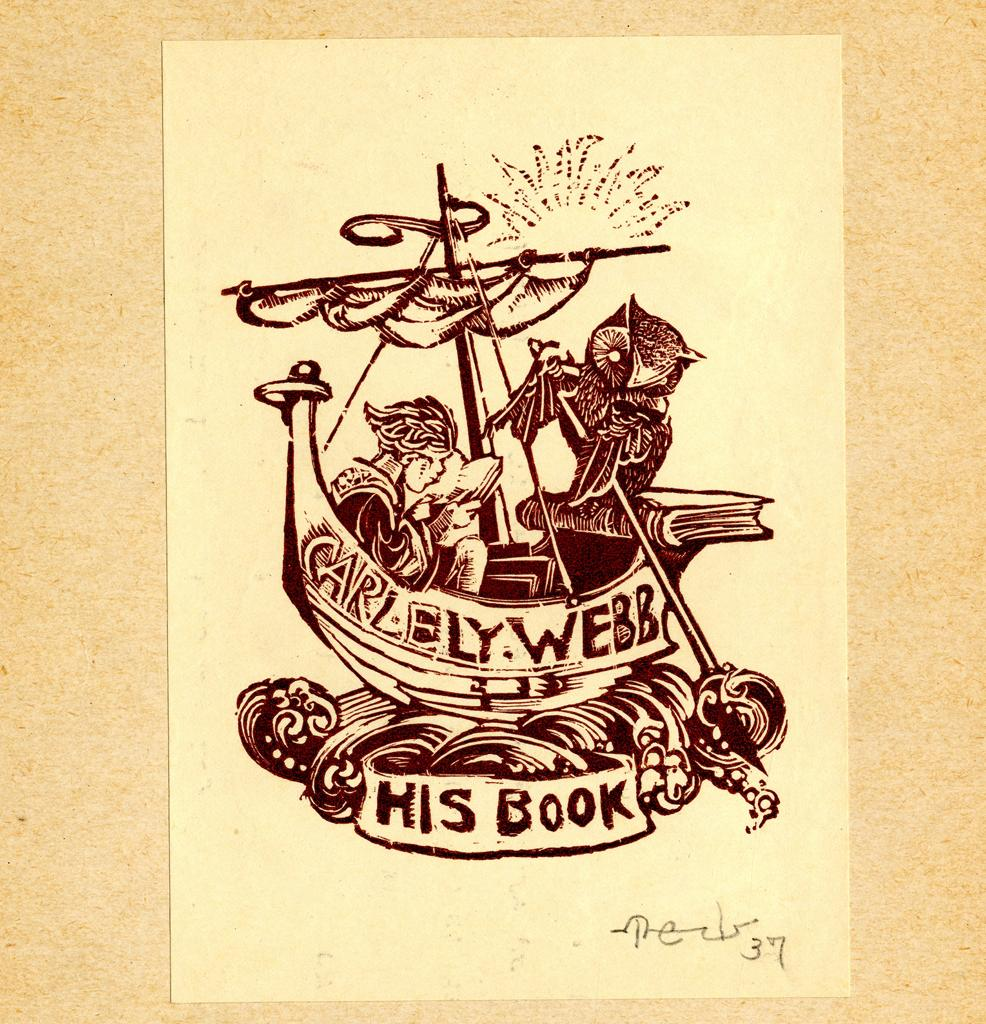
Bookplare for relative Carl Ely Webb

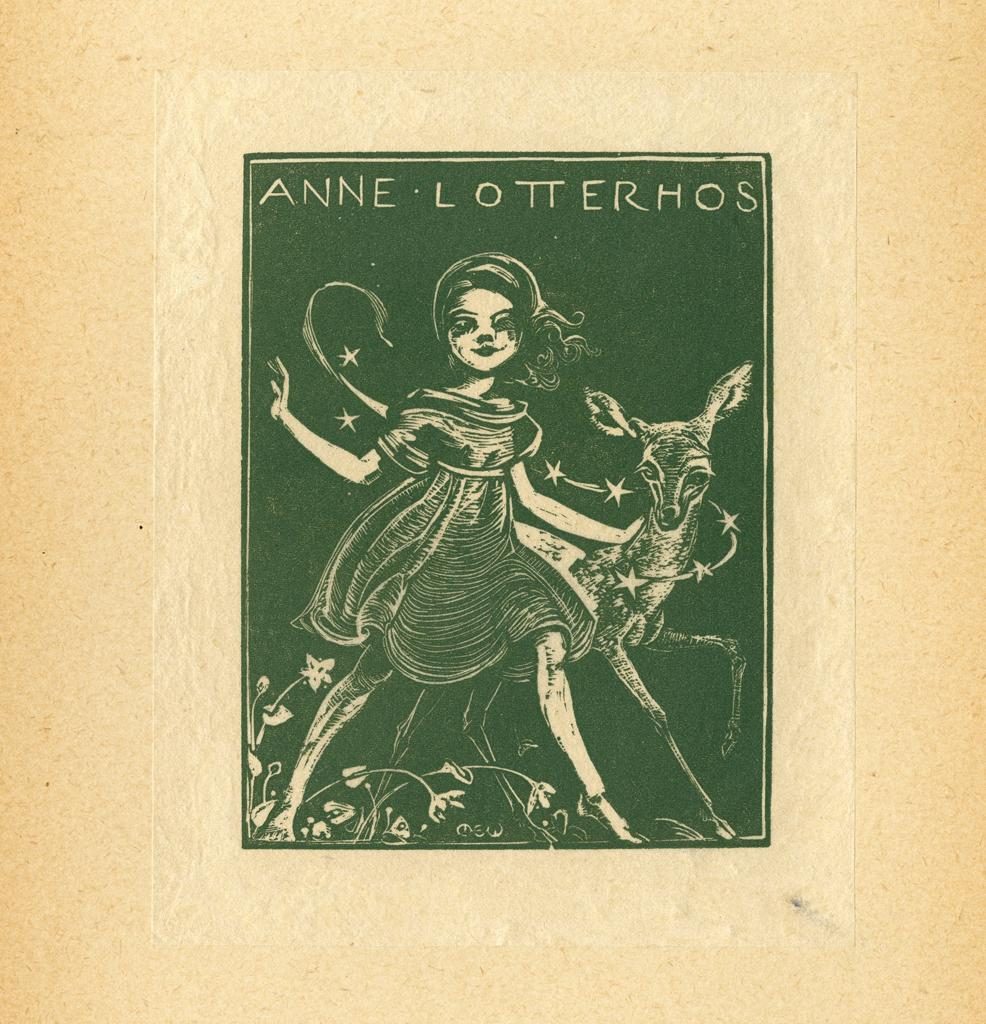
Bookplate for Anne Lotterhos
