= Grant Jackson (attorney) =

American judge (1866–1925)

Grant Jackson (1866–1925) was an attorney in Santa Barbara, California, and later a Los Angeles County Superior Court Judge, 1906–1915.

While practicing law in Santa Barbara, California, he gained a notorious reputation when he represented Yda Addis in her divorce from Charles A. Storke. The Daily Independent reported on July 11, 1898: "Grant Jackson and Yda Addis, the present warriors of Santa Barbara, were at one time dear friends, but their hearts no longer beat as one, but corporeally speaking, they beat at each other." When Addis discovered Jackson's duplicity between him and her husband, Addis broke into his home one night, and threatened him with a gun. Two bullets were fired. Jackson overpowered Addis and called for the police, and Addis was placed in jail. She also claimed to have been married to him under a contract in January 1895.

Jackson later left Santa Barbara for Los Angeles, where he became a community pillar and a judge. Jackson never married.
