= Thomas M. Storke =

American journalist (1876–1971)

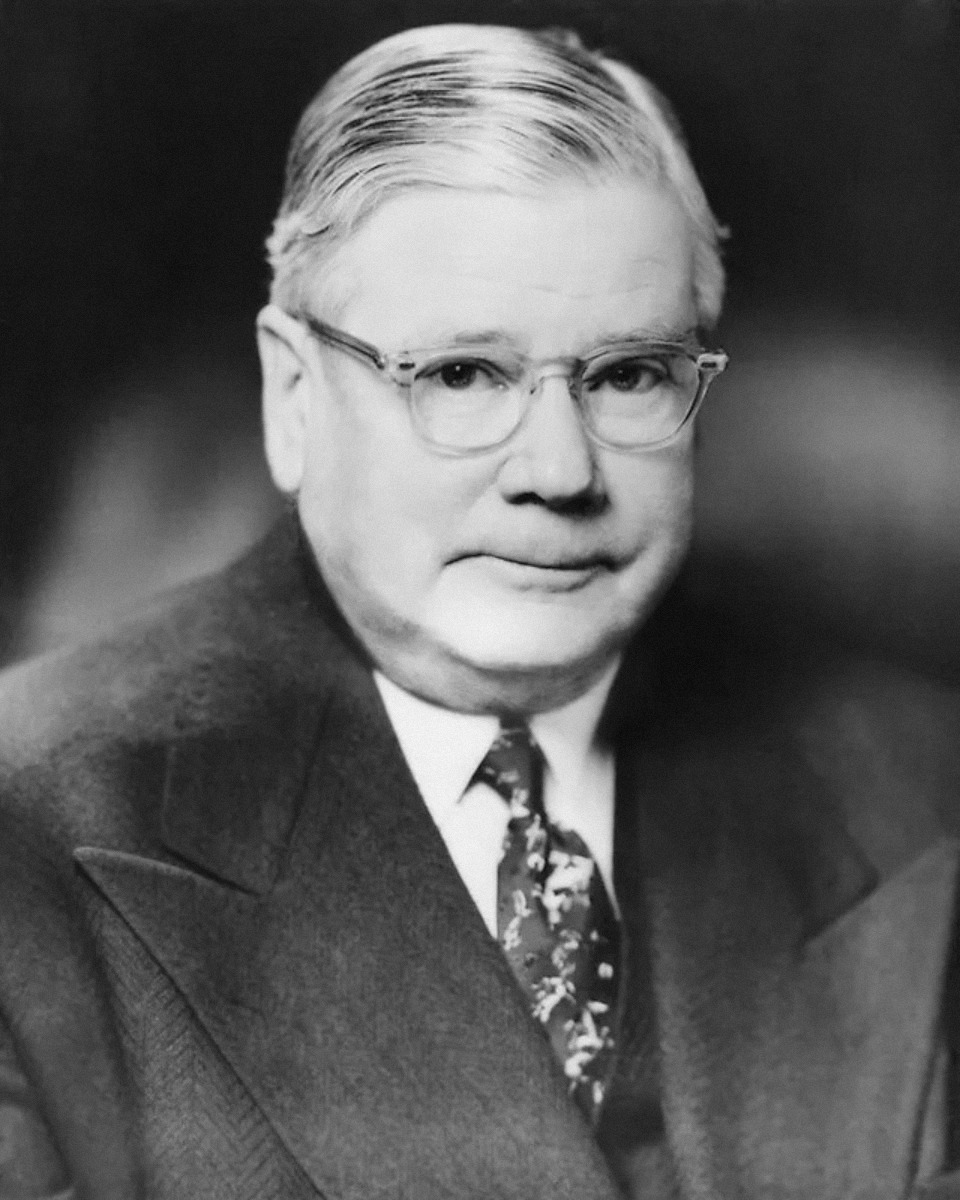

United States Senator from California
- In office November 9, 1938 – January 3, 1939
- Appointed by: Frank Merriam
- Preceded by: William Gibbs McAdoo
- Succeeded by: Sheridan Downey

Personal details
- Born: Thomas More Storke; November 23, 1876 Santa Barbara, California, U.S.
- Died: October 12, 1971 (aged 94) Santa Barbara, California, U.S.
- Resting place: Santa Barbara Cemetery, Montecito, California, U.S.
- Party: Democratic
- Spouse(s): Elsie Smith (m. 1904; died 1916) Marion Elizabeth Day (m. 1920)
- Children: 5
- Relatives: Charles A. Storke (father); Yda Hillis Addis (stepmother)
- Education: Stanford University
- Occupation: Politician; newspaper publisher; editor

Thomas More Storke (November 23, 1876 – October 12, 1971) was an American journalist, politician, postmaster, and publisher. He won the Pulitzer Prize in 1962. Storke also served as an interim United States senator, appointed to serve between the resignation of William Gibbs McAdoo in November 1938 and the January 1939 swearing-in of Sheridan Downey, who had been elected to succeed McAdoo.

== Early life and journalism career ==
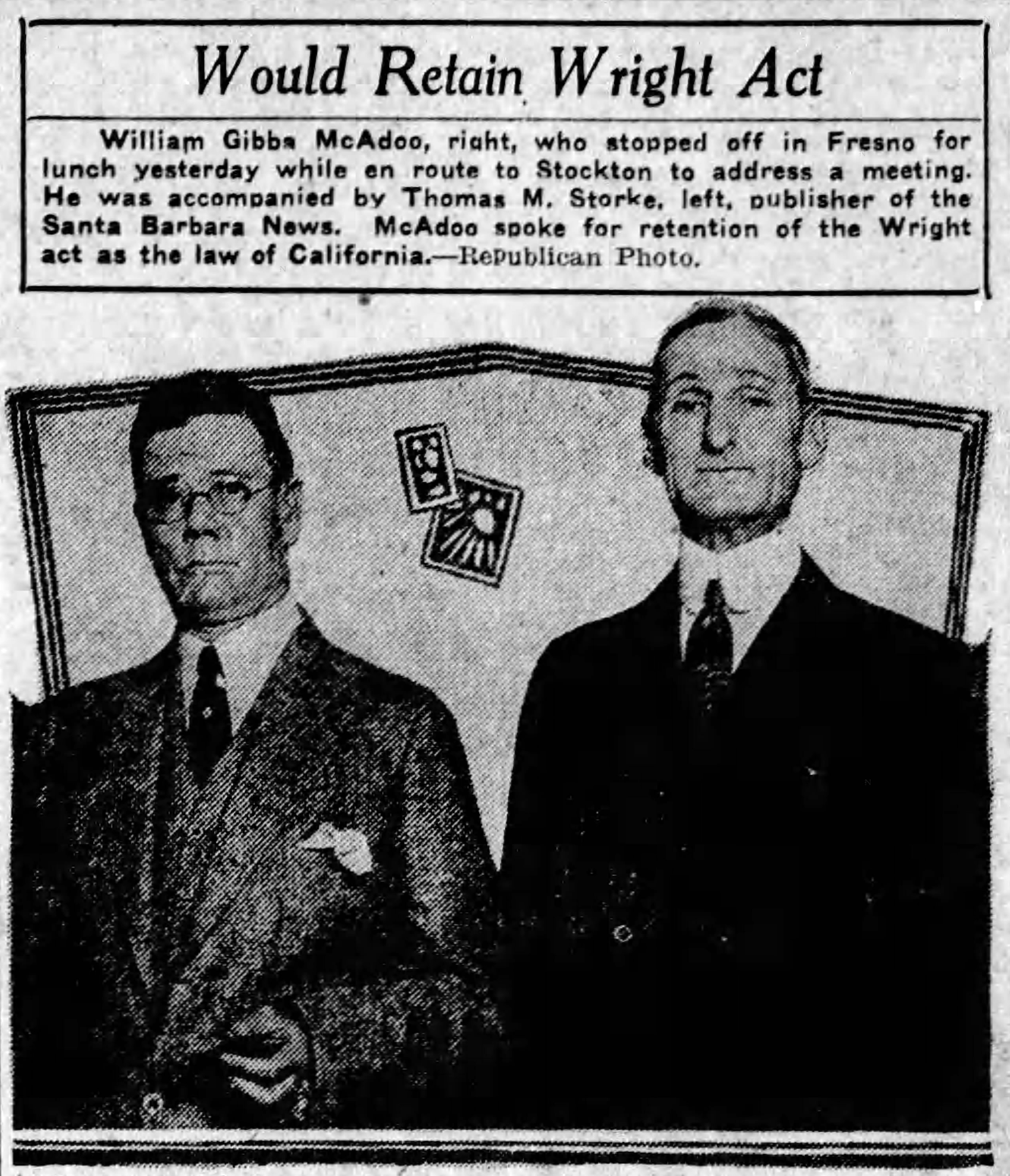
Storke and William Gibbs McAdoo in a clipping from the Fresno Morning Republican, October 23, 1926

Born and raised in Santa Barbara, Storke grew up bilingual in Spanish and English. His parents were eminent local citizen and politician Charles A. Storke and his wife, the former Martha "Mattie" More. His maternal grandmother was Rafaela Ortega, a Mexican from Santa Barbara, who in turn was the granddaughter of early Alta California settler José Francisco Ortega. As a child, he attended public schools in Santa Barbara. He moved on to Stanford University one year early, and graduated with a degree in economics in 1898 at age 21.

In 1900, Storke borrowed $2,000 (equivalent to $80,000 in 2025) and bought the Santa Barbara Daily Independent, the least favored newspaper in town. In 1909, he sold the outlet to get into the oil business and purchased the Santa Barbara Daily News in 1913. The spring prior, he was appointed as the Santa Barbara postmaster. Storke readopted the Daily Independent and combined that with the Daily News to birth the Santa Barbara Daily News & Independent. Years later, Storke bought The Morning Press, Santa Barbara's third paper. He later combined the two to create The Santa Barbara News-Press. After 23 years, it was sold for nearly $10 million to the publisher of The Philadelphia Bulletin.

== Later life and political career ==
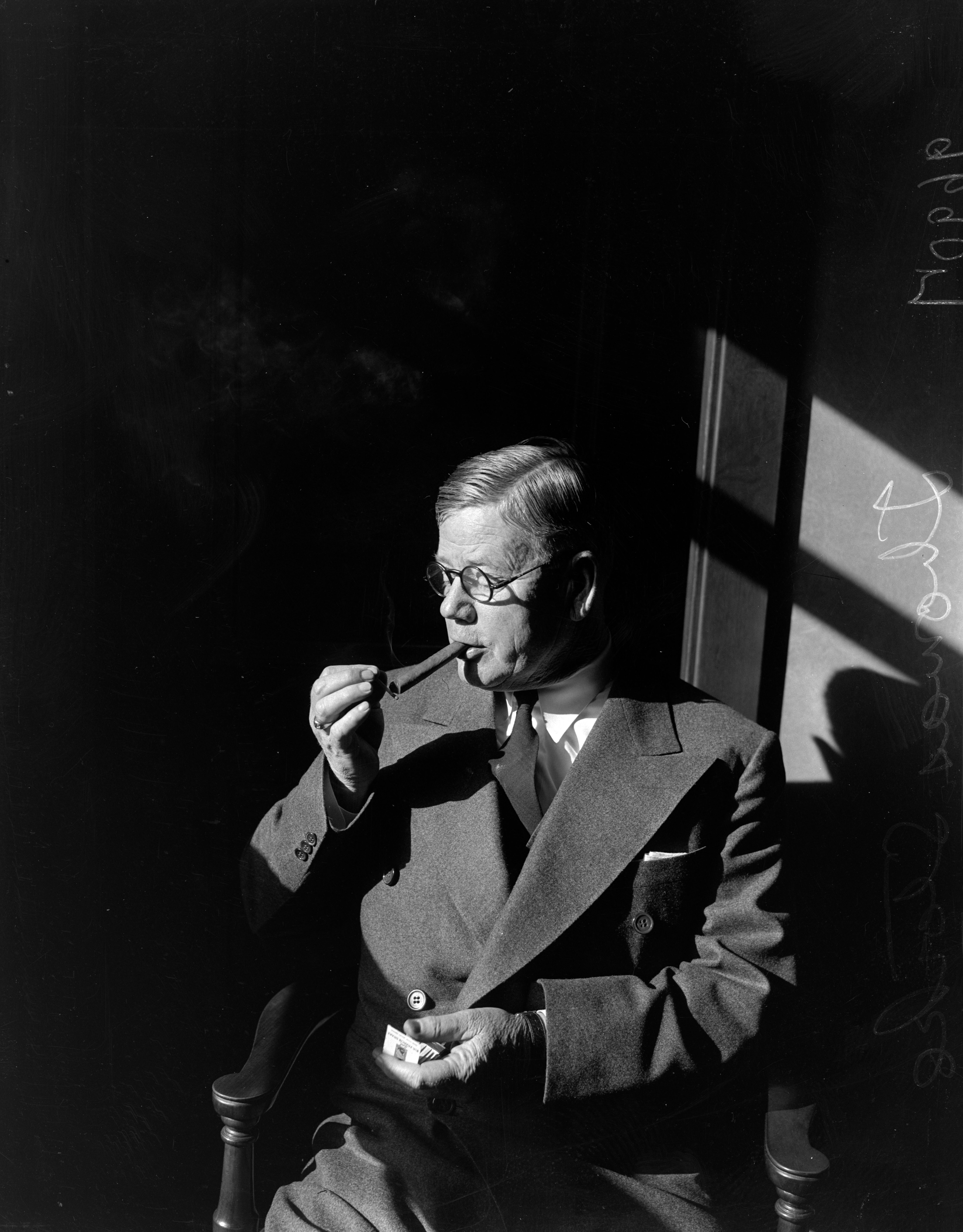
Storke shortly after his appointment, November 14, 1938

A Democrat in politics, Storke was appointed to the United States Senate by Republican California Governor Frank F. Merriam on November 9, 1938, to fill the vacancy caused by the resignation of William Gibbs McAdoo the day before. McAdoo had lost his bid for re-nomination, and he resigned his seat the day of the general election, won by Sheridan Downey, who had beaten McAdoo in the primary. Storke had not been a candidate for the seat, and served until the beginning of Downey's term on January 3, 1939. Storke flew to Washington and was sworn in by Edwin H. Halsey, the Secretary of the Senate. However, Congress was not in session during the time he was in office, so Storke never authored any legislation or cast a Senate vote.

He returned home and resumed working in the media, merging his newspaper the Santa Barbara News with the Morning Press to create the Santa Barbara News-Press. He also founded AM radio station KTMS. He was a member of the California Crime Commission from 1951–1952, and the Board of Regents of the University of California from 1955 until 1960.

In 1958, Storke wrote California Editor, a lengthy memoir rich in local Santa Barbara history.

In 1961, the John Birch Society attacked the Eisenhower administration and U.S. Chief Justice Earl Warren as being communists. Storke responded with a caustic series of editorials in the News-Press which won him popular acclaim as well as a number of prizes. These included the Pulitzer Prize in Journalism, for Editorial Writing in 1962, the Elijah Parish Lovejoy Award, and an honorary Doctor of Laws degree from Colby College.

Storke died of a stroke in 1971 at age 94, having had 10 grandchildren and 9 great-grandchildren. In 1973, Storke was posthumously inducted into the California Newspaper Hall of Fame.

== Contributions ==
Storke used his political clout to help obtain the present UCSB campus, over 900 coastal acres (3.6 km^{2}) and a former military installation, from the U.S. Government under the college land-grant program.

Part of Storke's lasting legacy is Storke Tower, a 190-foot structure in the center of the UCSB campus, being the tallest tower in the county as well as the only five-octave chromatic-bell system.

Beneath Storke Tower is the Storke Communication Plaza, which houses the offices of the campus Daily Nexus newspaper and the studios of community radio station KCSB-FM.

== See also ==
- History of Santa Barbara, California
- List of Hispanic and Latino Americans in the United States Congress

== Notes ==
U.S. Senate
| Preceded by William Gibbs McAdoo | U.S. Senator (Class 3) from California; 1938–1939 | Succeeded by Sheridan Downey |
