= Los Angeles Herald Examiner =

Newspaper in California, US (1963–1989)

- Cover of Los Angeles Herald Examiner (14 October 1966)
- Type: Evening Daily newspaper (Mondays to Fridays); Mornings (Saturday and Sunday)
- Format: Print
- Publisher: Hearst Corporation
- Founded: 1962–November 2, 1989; As a result of a merger of Los Angeles Herald-Express (1931–1962) and Los Angeles Examiner (1903–1962)
- Language: English

Los Angeles Herald Examiner Building
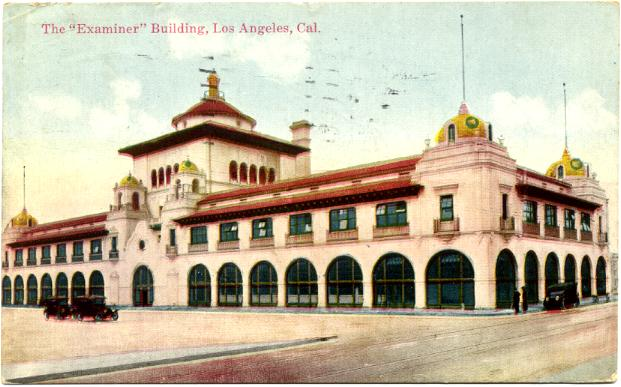
- Location: 146 W. 11th Street, Downtown Los Angeles.

Los Angeles Historic-Cultural Monument
- Designated: 18 August 1977
- Reference no.: 178

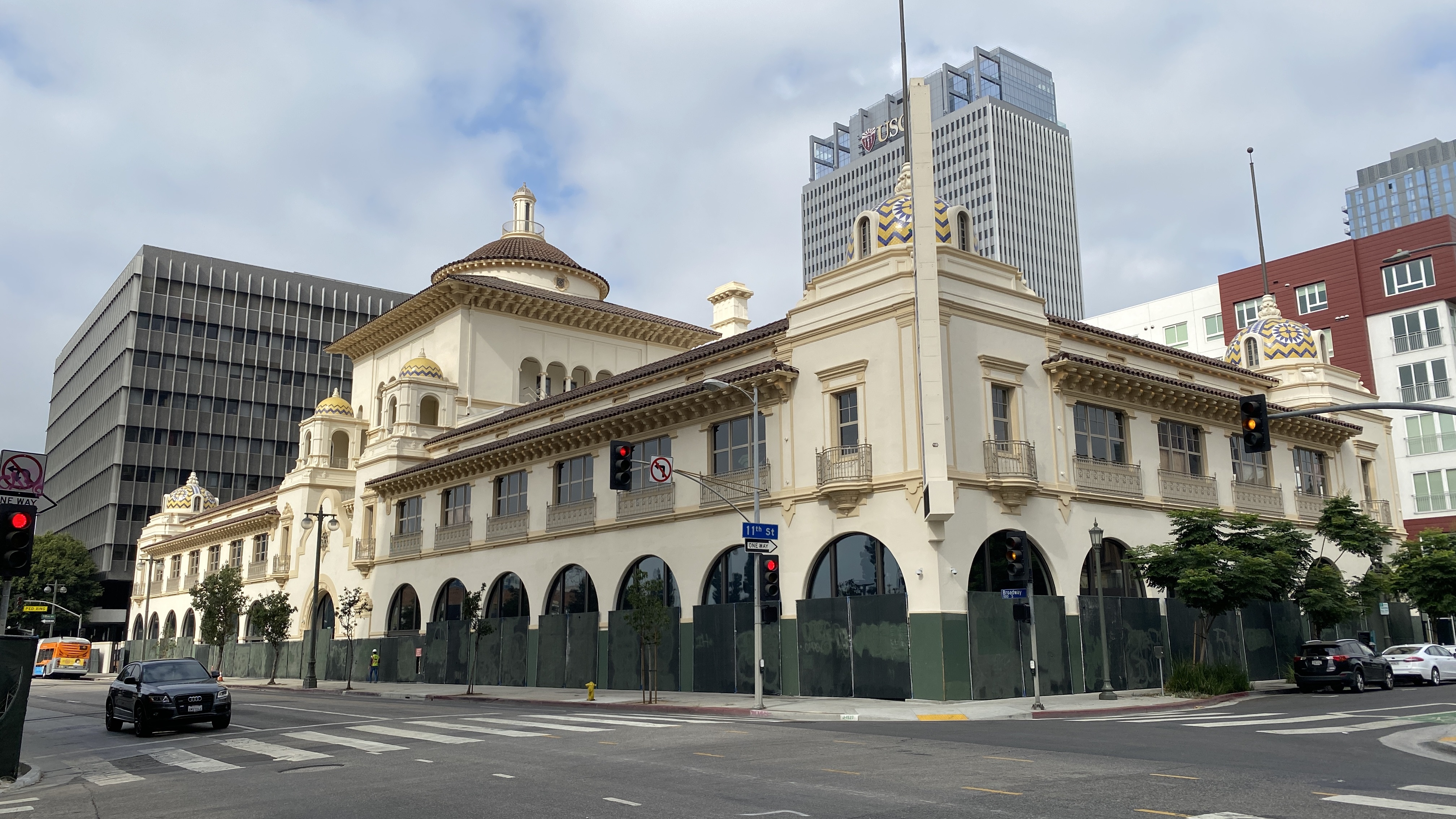
Herald Examiner Building, September 2020

The Los Angeles Herald Examiner was a major Los Angeles daily newspaper, published in the afternoon from Monday to Friday and in the morning on Saturdays and Sundays. It was part of the Hearst syndicate. It was formed when the afternoon Herald-Express and the morning Los Angeles Examiner, both of which had been published there since the turn of the 20th century, merged in 1962.

For a few years after the merger, the Los Angeles Herald Examiner had the largest afternoon-newspaper circulation in the US. It published its last edition on November 2, 1989.

== Early years ==
William Randolph Hearst founded the Los Angeles Examiner in 1903, in order to assist his campaign for the presidential nomination on the Democratic ticket, complement his San Francisco Examiner, and provide a union-friendly answer to the Los Angeles Times. At its peak in 1960, the Examiner had a circulation of 381,037. It attracted the top newspapermen and women of the day. The Examiner flourished in the 1940s under the leadership of the city editor James H. Richardson, who led his reporters to emphasize crime and Hollywood scandal coverage.

The Los Angeles Herald Examiner was the result of a merger with the Los Angeles Herald-Express in 1962. In turn, the Herald-Express had been the result of a merger between the Los Angeles Evening Express and Evening Herald in 1931. The Herald-Express was also Hearst-owned and excelled in tabloid journalism under City Editor Agness Underwood, a veteran crime reporter for the Los Angeles Record before moving to the Herald-Express first as a reporter and later its city editor. With the merger in 1962, the newspaper became an afternoon-only newspaper.

The Examiner, while founded as a pro-labor newspaper, shifted to a hard-right stance by the 1930s, much like the rest of the Hearst chain. It was pro-law enforcement and was vehemently anti-Japanese during World War II. Its editorials openly praised the mass deportation of Mexicans, including U.S. citizens, in the early 1930s, and was hostile to liberal movements and labor strikes during the Depression. Its coverage of the Zoot Suit Riots in Los Angeles during World War II also was particularly harsh on the Mexican-American community.

Much of its conservative rhetoric was minimized when Richardson retired in 1957. Underwood remained on the staff following the merger in an upper management position, leaving the day-to-day operations to younger editors.

The Hearst Corporation decided to make the new Herald Examiner an afternoon paper, leaving the morning field to the Los Angeles Times (which at the same time had ceased publication of the evening Mirror). However, readers' tastes and demographics were changing. Afternoon newspaper readership was declining as television news became more prominent, while expanding suburbs made it harder to distribute papers during the rush hour. The fact that sports leagues were playing more night games also meant that evening newspapers were no longer able to print full results. Indeed, by the 1950s Hearst's morning papers such as the Examiner had their income siphoned off merely to support the chain's faltering afternoon publications. Following the merger between the Herald-Express and Examiner, readership of the morning Los Angeles Times soared to 757,000 weekday readers and more than 1 million on Sunday. The Herald Examiner's circulation dropped from a high of 730,000 in the mid-1960s to 350,000 in 1977. By the time it closed in 1989 its circulation was 238,000.

== Strike and closure ==
On December 15, 1967, Herald Examiner employees began a strike that lasted almost a decade and resulted in at least $15 million in losses. At the time of the labor strike, the paper's circulation was about 721,000 daily and it had 2,000 employees. The strike ended in March 1977, with circulation having dropped to about 350,000 and the number of employees to 700.

Owner William Randolph Hearst, Jr.'s confrontational response prolonged the unrest. He hired a number of strike-breakers to keep the paper going, as well as Pinkerton guards to maintain security, protect the strike-breakers and harass the strikers. Numerous violent incidents took place between pickets and strike-breakers, as well as confrontations between the guards and the Los Angeles Police Department.

=== Final years ===
The paper enjoyed a journalistic and spiritual renaissance beginning in 1978, when Jim Bellows was hired as its editor. "On January 1, Jim Bellows came to Los Angeles as editor of the worst urban daily newspaper in America, the Los Angeles Herald Examiner," read a profile in Esquire magazine, in 1978. Bellows and his successor, Mary Ann Dolan, brought an infusion of new talent, youth and energy to the newsroom. The excitement of rejuvenating a newspaper in Los Angeles with a storied past attracted a stream of young journalists, many with Ivy League credentials. The paper's scrappy, no-holds-barred, often unconventional coverage repeatedly challenged the dominant Los Angeles Times on stories about City Hall, local politics, the Los Angeles Police Department, the arts and sports, and its coverage was recognized repeatedly for its excellence by the Los Angeles Press Club. The paper was also slightly eclectic: its entertainment section was hip, its sports section was blue-collar and its news hole straddled the tabloid and muckraking journalism genres. However, as an after-effect of the 10-year long strike, advertising and circulation continued to decline.

The paper switched back to a morning publication in 1982, 20 years after the merger; this did little to improve sagging revenue and readership. Furthermore, having two editions led to higher production costs. The afternoon edition was dropped during 1989.

In 1989, the Hearst Corporation attempted to sell the moribund newspaper, but found no suitable buyers (News Corporation intended to buy the paper and turn it into a tabloid, but backed out). This led to the company's shutting down the newspaper.

On November 2, 1989, the paper printed its last edition, with a banner head saying "SO LONG, L.A.!" One factor behind the shutdown was increased pressure from the competing Los Angeles Times, whose circulation was, at the time of the Herald Examiner's shutdown, about four times larger.

Editorial writer Joel Bellman recalled that by then the newspaper's

once-splendid 1913 Julia Morgan-inspired Mission Revival building had gone to seed, the ground-floor arched windows long since covered over as a result of vandalism . . . . Its beautiful lobby and graceful staircase to the second-floor newsroom were virtually all that was left of the original interior; the rest looked like a cheap 1950s-era retrofit.

== Notable cases ==
=== Black Dahlia coverage ===
This specific section relates to the period when the newspaper was known as the Los Angeles Examiner

The Examiner was the first newspaper to break the story of the 1947 dismemberment murder of 22-year-old Elizabeth Short, who was ultimately dubbed the Black Dahlia by Los Angeles Herald-Express crime reporter Bevo Means.

Examiner news reporter Will Fowler was on another assignment with photographer Felix Paegel on January 15, 1947, when they heard a radio call of a mutilated female body found in a vacant lot on Norton Avenue in the Leimert Park area of Los Angeles. Fowler and Paegel arrived before police and observed the female body. Fowler claimed in his autobiography that he knelt down to close the victim's eyes before Paegel began shooting photographs. City editor Richardson in his own autobiography had another, more mundane version of the Examiner obtaining the story. He said that reporter Bill Zelinsky called the city desk from Los Angeles Police headquarters to report the discovery of the body and a reporter and photographer were dispatched to the lot where a crowd of newsmen was already assembled.

Whatever the facts were, the morning Examiner scooped the other Los Angeles newspapers by publishing an extra edition two hours before any of the afternoon newspapers hit the streets.

By the late afternoon of January 15, an autopsy on the female victim was completed by the Los Angeles County Coroner's Office. The victim's fingerprints were scheduled to be airmailed to the FBI fingerprint identification division in Washington, D.C. Examiner Assistant Managing Editor Warden Woolard suggested to Los Angeles police Capt. Jack Donahoe, who was chief of the department's homicide division, that the victim's fingerprints be transmitted to the FBI by using the Examiner's new soundphoto machine. During the early morning hours of January 16, the International News Photo wire service received the prints via photo transmission from the Examiner. Soon afterward, the FBI identified the victim as Elizabeth Short.

In the early afternoon of January 16 an Examiner extra hit the streets, again beating the competition. The Examiner identified Short and provided details of her life growing up in Massachusetts, and details of her adult life in Santa Barbara and later in Los Angeles. The Examiner noted that Short had lived in Los Angeles for a period of time before moving to various other cities in the pursuit of jobs and men. She returned to Los Angeles in 1946 and lived in hotels and rooming houses while visiting a man she had met while living in Florida.

Following Short's identification, a team of reporters from the Examiner contacted her mother, Phoebe Short, in Boston over the phone. Wain Sutton spoke with Short's mother while City Editor Jimmy Richardson and Jim Murray sat next to him. Sutton intentionally deceived Phoebe and told her that her daughter had won a beauty contest. It was only after prying as much personal information as they could from Phoebe that the reporters revealed that her daughter had in fact been murdered.

Jim Murray would recount the infamous phone call to journalist Larry Harnisch in an interview decades later:

“Wain called the mother and asked all these questions and took all these notes,” Murray recalled. “I sat there and listened to the poor, dear mother telling him about her school-day triumphs. I can still see him put his hand over the mouthpiece of the old-fashioned upright phone and say, ‘Now, what do I tell her?’

Richardson screwed up his one good eye and said, ‘Now tell her’

“’You son of a bitch,’” Murray said, imitating Sutton.

Murray told Harnisch in the same interview that he was “still appalled” and that the “incident was sharply etched in his memory.” Phoebe Short initially could not believe what the reporters had told her. She refused to believe that her daughter had been murdered until eventually she received confirmation from the Los Angeles Police through her local police department.

The newspaper offered to pay her air fare and accommodations if she would travel to Los Angeles to help with the police investigation. That was yet another ploy, since the newspaper kept her away from police and other reporters to protect its scoop.

Each day the Examiner came up with more details of Short's murder, and painted her as a lovelorn woman searching for a husband. The Los Angeles Daily News was getting hammered daily by the Examiner. The newspaper's editors were so desperate for fresh stories that they sent rookie reporter Roy Ringer to the Examiner's offices on Broadway. Ringer was new and unknown to Examiner newsmen. He walked into the Examiner's composing room from off the street and lifted the Black Dahlia story proofs off the spikes and walked out. The Daily News city desk then rewrote the Examiner's stories. After three days of stealing Examiner copy, Ringer walked into the composing room on the fourth day for a fresh batch of Black Dahlia stories. As he was about to grab a handful of proofs from the spike, someone from behind grabbed his shoulder. Behind Ringer was Examiner city editor James Richardson. "Nice try", said Richardson, as he sent Ringer back to the Daily News empty-handed.

At one point an anonymous tip led Examiner reporters to the Greyhound bus station in downtown Los Angeles, where a steamer trunk owned by Short was discovered. Inside were letters, photographs and clothing belonging to the victim. The Examiner obtained the contents and led coverage of Short's life leading up to her death based on her own personal records and in her own voice. In another instance, more photos, newspaper clippings and letters were anonymously mailed to the Examiner. Richardson often said in subsequent interviews about his years at the Examiner that he believed the letters were from Short's killer.

The Black Dahlia case was never solved, but for three months it led most of the Los Angeles newspaper's front pages until other sensational homicides replaced it.

=== Jailing of William Farr ===
During the 1970 Los Angeles murder trial of Charles Manson and his followers, who were charged with the 1969 murders of actress Sharon Tate and six others, Herald Examiner reporter William Farr reported in an article that Manson had planned to murder Elizabeth Taylor and Frank Sinatra.

Farr was summoned by judge Charles Older to divulge his sources for the article. Farr refused. But at that time, Farr had already left the Herald Examiner to work for the Los Angeles County District Attorney's Office and later for the Los Angeles Times. Farr cited the California reporters shield law that protected him from revealing his sources, but Older ruled that since Farr was no longer a journalist he was required to hand over his notes.

Farr continued to refuse to reveal his sources and was jailed for 48 days from 1972 to January 11, 1973, on a contempt of court citation. Although he was released from custody by order of U.S. Supreme Court Justice William O. Douglas while the decision was on appeal, his case dragged through the courts for several years. The courts, however, recognized that a journalist could spend the rest of his life in jail if he refuses to divulge his sources on moral principle. In 1974, a California State Court of Appeal determined in In re Farr (36 C.A. 3d 577, 1974) that a procedure had to be adopted that allowed the courts to hold a hearing to consider a contempt of court citation involving the shield law. The first issue was whether a reporter was refusing to reveal sources by invoking the shield on "moral principle". The second consideration by the court was whether incarcerating the reporter would likely induce him or her to reveal the sources. In 1976, the state appellate court finally set aside the contempt citation.

The Farr case in effect strengthened the California shield law and served as a precedent in future shield law cases involving journalists.

== Building ==
The Los Angeles Herald Examiner Building is at the southwest corner of Broadway and 11th Street in southern Downtown Los Angeles. Hearst paid $1 million in 1913 for the parcel, which was part of railroad magnate Henry Huntington's land holdings. The building was designed in the Mission Revival and Spanish Colonial Revival styles, largely by San Francisco architect Julia Morgan, then associated with Los Angeles architects J. Martyn Haenke and William J. Dodd, whose contributions have not yet been determined by scholars. It was completed in 1914, and is a Los Angeles Historic-Cultural Monument.

After the newspaper closed in 1989, the building remained in use as a popular filming location for 26 years, with its ornate, period appropriate lobby to 15 standing sets ranging from a modern police station, a courtroom, a hospital, to an industrial basement perfect for horror. It was once the second-most-filmed location in Los Angeles having hosted over 1,250 individual productions as of 2013, ranging from Hollywood blockbusters such as Short Cuts (1993), The Usual Suspects (1995), the Academy Award winner, Dreamgirls (2006), to its last production, the indie film Fixed (2017), produced by longtime property manager Bryan Erwin. It was also featured in television series as varied as Murder, She Wrote, Brooklyn Nine-Nine, and It's Always Sunny in Philadelphia. The property hosted its last production in July 2015.

Georgetown Co., a New York real estate developer, obtained control of the site in 2015. Plans for an $80-million renovation by architecture firm Gensler included restaurants and shops on the ground floor and offices in the remaining space. Walter and Margarita Manzke were planning a restaurant there. In 2019, Arizona State University announced plans to locate its Los Angeles campus in the building, which was eventually opened in 2022.

== Earlier publication ==
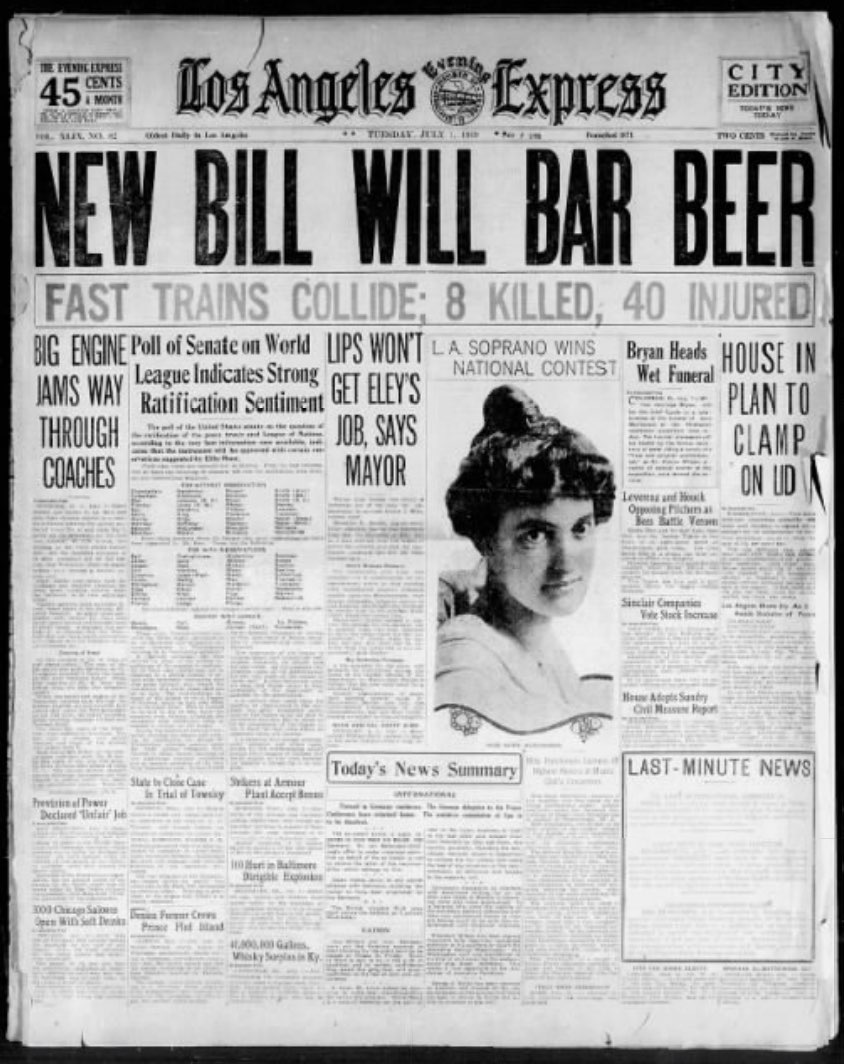
The cover of the Los Angeles Express detailing the start of the Wartime Prohibition Act on July 1, 1919

Los Angeles Herald front page (May 30, 1916

=== Los Angeles Express ===
The Los Angeles Express was Los Angeles's oldest newspaper published under its original name until it merged with the Herald. It was established on March 27, 1871.

=== Los Angeles Herald ===
Established in 1873, the Los Angeles Herald or the Evening Herald represented the largely Democratic views of the city and focused primarily on issues local to Los Angeles and Southern California. The Los Angeles Daily Herald was first published on October 2, 1873, by Charles A. Storke. It was the first newspaper in Southern California to use the innovative steam press; the newspaper's offices at 125 South Broadway were popular with the public because large windows on the ground floor allowed passersby to see the presses in motion. In 1922, the Herald officially joined the Hearst News empire.

=== Los Angeles Herald-Express ===
In 1931, Hearst merged the Los Angeles Daily Herald with the Los Angeles Evening Express to form the Los Angeles Evening Herald and Express, which was then the largest-circulating evening newspaper west of the Mississippi.

== Notable staff members ==
=== Writers and editors ===
- James Bacon, entertainment reporter; author
- Jim Bellows, editor; later developed Entertainment Tonight
- Winfred Blevins, entertainment editor; author of 40 books and screenplays
- Alex Ben Block, reporter; later editor of The Hollywood Reporter
- Denis Boyles, entertainment writer, 1979–1981
- Jim Burns, travel editor; later newspaper adviser for "The Occidental Weekly"
- Harrison Carroll, entertainment writer, 1925–1969
- Ruben Castaneda, reporter; author of S Street Rising
- Stanley Cloud, executive editor, 1982–1986
- Jim Cramer, obituary writer; author and host of CNBC's Mad Money
- Francis L. Dale, final publisher of Herald Examiner; also part-owner of the Cincinnati Reds
- Mel Durslag, sports columnist; also columnist for TV Guide
- Donald Forst, editor; also editor of Newsday and The Village Voice
- Andy Furillo, reporter, author of the book The Steamer: Bud Furillo and the Golden Age of L.A. Sports
- Bud Furillo, sports editor and columnist, actor; host of Sportstalk on KABC Talkradio
- John Tracy Gaffey, first Herald editor, 1893; City Council member who helped develop the Port of Los Angeles
- Carl Greenberg, reporter; later political editor of the Los Angeles Times
- Harold A. Henry, reporter; later a community journalist and City Council member
- L. D. Hotchkiss, editor
- Bob Hunter, baseball writer, 1943–1977
- David Israel, columnist; later a television writer and producer
- Andrew Jaffe, business editor; later executive with Adweek
- James Kinsella, president and founding general manager of MSNBC
- Christopher Knight, art critic
- Doug Krikorian, sports columnist
- Rian Malan, reporter from South Africa; later author of the book My Traitor's Heart
- Gardner McKay, literary critic, 1977–1982; actor
- Gilmore Millen, novelist, rewriteman on the Los Angeles Herald-Express
- Joe Morgenstern, film critic; later won a Pulitzer Prize with The Wall Street Journal
- Jim Murray, reporter on the Los Angeles Examiner; later legendary Pulitzer Prize-winning sports columnist at the Los Angeles Times
- Scot J. Paltrow, financial journalist
- Rip Rense, critic and author
- James H. "Jimmy" Richardson, legendary city editor of the Los Angeles Examiner
- John Schwada, City Hall reporter; later with the Los Angeles Times and Fox 11 News
- Mark Schwed, TV critic
- Jack Smith, reporter on the Los Angeles Herald-Express; later renowned city columnist at the Los Angeles Times
- Al Stump, sportswriter; later a biographer of Ty Cobb
- Ken Tucker, rock critic
- Agness Underwood, reporter and then one of the first female city editors of a major metropolitan daily, at the predecessor Herald-Express; later an editor at the Herald Examiner
- Nicole Yorkin, reporter; later television writer, producer
- Gene Youngblood, critic

=== Photographers ===
- Chris Gulker
- Sam Sansone

=== Cartoonists ===
- Karl Hubenthal
- Bill Schorr
- Bob Bentovoja

== See also ==
- Los Angeles Examiner
- Los Angeles Express
- Los Angeles Herald
- Los Angeles Herald-Express
