= John Schwada =

John Schwada may refer to:

- John Schwada (journalist), reporter for KTTV Fox 11 News in Los Angeles
- John W. Schwada, first chancellor of the University of Missouri in Columbia, Missouri
