= Herald-Examiner =

Herald Examiner or Herald-Examiner may refer to the following newspapers:

- Chicago Herald-Examiner
- Los Angeles Herald-Examiner
