= Yda Hillis Addis =

American writer (1857–after 1902)

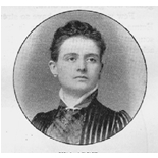
- Born: 1857 Leavenworth, Kansas, U.S.
- Died: after 1902
- Occupation: Writer
- Spouse: Charles A. Storke (m. 1890; div. 1894); no children
- Parents: Alfred Shea Addis
- Other names: Yda Addis Storke

Yda Hillis Addis (born 1857, (Note: Her death certificate indicates her birth was October 3, 1857. However, one authority suggests 1859 as the year of her birth. See "Addis, Alfred Shea", in Palmquist; et al. (2005). Pioneer Photographers from the Mississippi to the Continental Divide. p. 68. ISBN 9780804740579.) disappeared 1902 in California, U.S.) was the first American writer to translate ancient Mexican oral stories and histories into English, some of which she submitted to San Francisco-based newspaper The Argonaut. The most widely popular of her more than 100 stories are Roman's Romance and Roger's Luck.

== Early life ==
Addis was born in 1857 in Leavenworth, Kansas, and moved with her family to Chihuahua, Mexico, at the start of the American Civil War. The daughter of an itinerant photographer, Alfred Shea Addis, she roamed the Western frontier and Mexican wilderness, into indigenous villages, miners' camps, and other locations, mostly in Mexico and California, assisting her father. When she was 15, Addis and her family moved to Los Angeles, where she graduated with the first class of Los Angeles High School, a graduating class of seven students. She also began teaching seven-year-olds.

== Career ==
=== Fiction-writing ===
Addis wrote many short stories, drawn from Mexican oral sources, as well as original fiction. Her writings included ghost stories, visitations of the unseen, tragic love triangles, and stories that presaged American feminism. In 1880 Addis submitted her stories of heroines, such as Poetic Justice and Señorita Santos, to The Argonaut, a bi-monthly San Francisco journal founded by Frank M. Pixley. Soon, her work was printed in other publications such as The Californian, The Overland Monthly, Harper's Monthly, the San Francisco Chronicle and Examiner, the Los Angeles Herald, the St. Louis Dispatch, the Chicago Times, the Philadelphia Press, McClure's magazine, and many Mexican newspapers and periodicals.

=== Travel writing ===
When the editors of the various publications to which Addis was connected discovered that she was often going out of the country, they took advantage of the opportunity to employ her as a travel writer. Most 19th century readers were unfamiliar with her travel dispatches; her travel literature and articles have only resurfaced of late.

== Personal life ==
Pixley introduced Addis to his good friend John G. Downey, a former governor of California, in his late sixties. When Downey's sisters discovered that he and Addis had become engaged, they shanghaied Downey to Ireland, leading Addis to sue for breach of promise. Before the trial date, Addis left San Francisco for Mexico City to write for the bilingual newspaper Two Republics, owned by J. Magtella Clark. When the editor, Theodore Gesterfeld, reportedly became distracted by Addis' wit and charm, the editor's wife, Ursula, sued for divorce and named Addis a co-defendant. In Gesterfeld's testimony, he admitted to committing adultery, but not with Addis.

With this unfavorable publicity, Addis left Mexico for Santa Barbara, California, and began collecting material about prominent people of the area for a book of biographies to be published by Lewis Publishing Company. During one of her interviews, she met Charles A. Storke, a local attorney and owner of the Santa Barbara News-Press, whom she married shortly thereafter. Storke was reportedly attracted to Addis for her quick mind, her good social standing and her fame as a writer. Addis may have viewed Storke as a man who could offer her financial security. They were married on September 10, 1890.

Addis' history of Santa Barbara, her only book, was published in 1891. However, Addis claimed she was treated badly by both Storke and his teenage son Tommy, accusing Storke of peculiar intimate behaviors and violence toward her. Storke retaliated with a divorce complaint on the grounds that Addis was insane. On January 24, 1894 she was involved in a trial with Cottage Hospital over the sum of $225.00 (equivalent to $8,177 in 2024) for medical treatment which she lost. On December 28, 1894, in the divorce suit of Charles Storke vs Yda Storke, the trial was resolved in favor of the plaintiff.

During the divorce Addis discovered that her attorney, Grant Jackson, was assisting Storke. Addis subsequently broke into Jackson's home one night carrying two .38 revolvers and threatened to shoot him. One bullet was fired, which passed through the floor. Jackson overpowered Addis and called for the police, and she was placed in jail. Addis spent eight months in prison. In February 1900, she was sentenced to serve a year in the Santa Barbara County Jail in a libel case. After serving ten months she was released in May 1900 with two months credit time. In June 1901 in the case of C.A. Storke vs Ada Storke order dismissing motion for new trial.

When Addis was released from jail, her divorce from Storke was not final and she requested alimony. At this time Clara Shortridge Foltz stepped in briefly to defend Addis. Storke refused to pay the $500 a month that Addis requested and instead had Addis committed to an insane asylum. Addis later escaped from the asylum, and disappeared.

While it was long assumed that Addis disappeared in 1901, with some sources claiming she was committed by Storke to an asylum, from which she escaped, research by Ashley C. Short suggests that Addis reinvented herself as Adelayda Hillis Jackson, taking a name from her mother's family and that of her purported second husband Grant Jackson while tacking on "Yda" to her new first name, and spent nearly thirty years in Texas (after perhaps living in San Francisco and México). Mainly residing in San Antonio, Adelayda Hillis Jackson spent the last decade of her life committed in the state hospital in that city and died in 1941.

== See also ==
- List of people who disappeared mysteriously (pre-1910)
