= University of California, Santa Barbara campus =

General information
- Type: University campus
- Location: Santa Barbara, California, United States

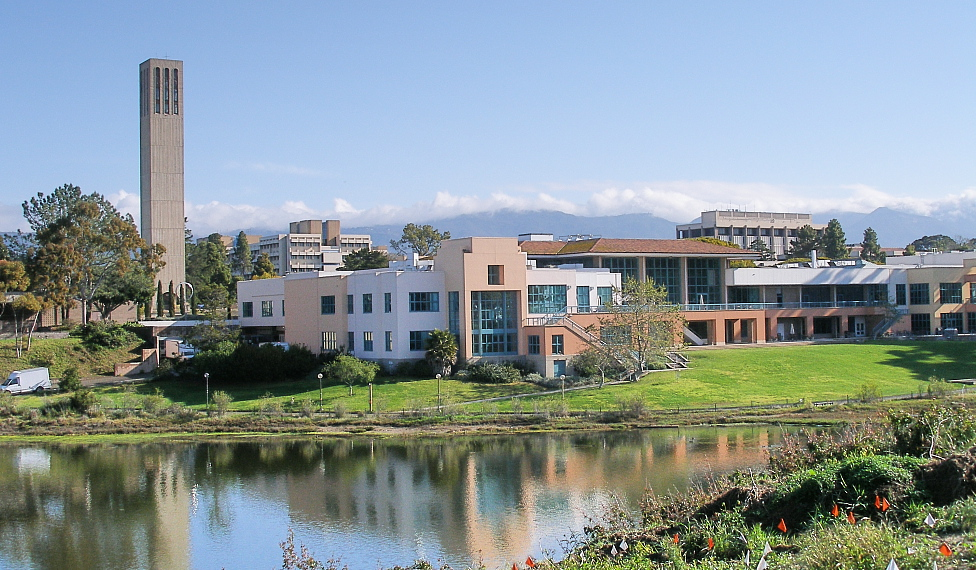
The Storke Tower and the University Center in front of the UCSB Lagoon.

The University of California, Santa Barbara (UCSB) campus is located around 10 miles west of downtown Santa Barbara in Santa Barbara County, California.

== Overview ==
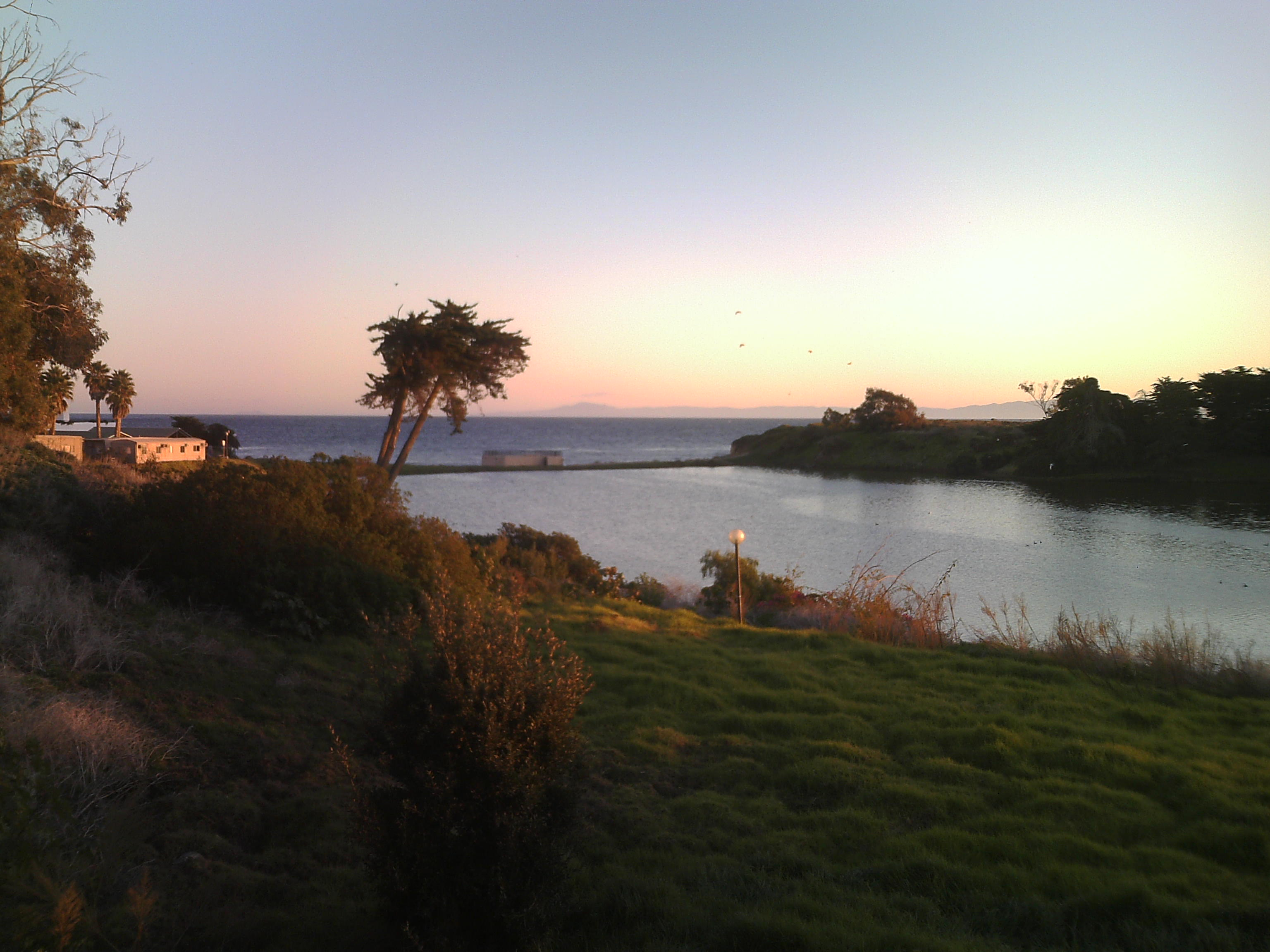
A view over the school's lagoon to one of the Channel Islands

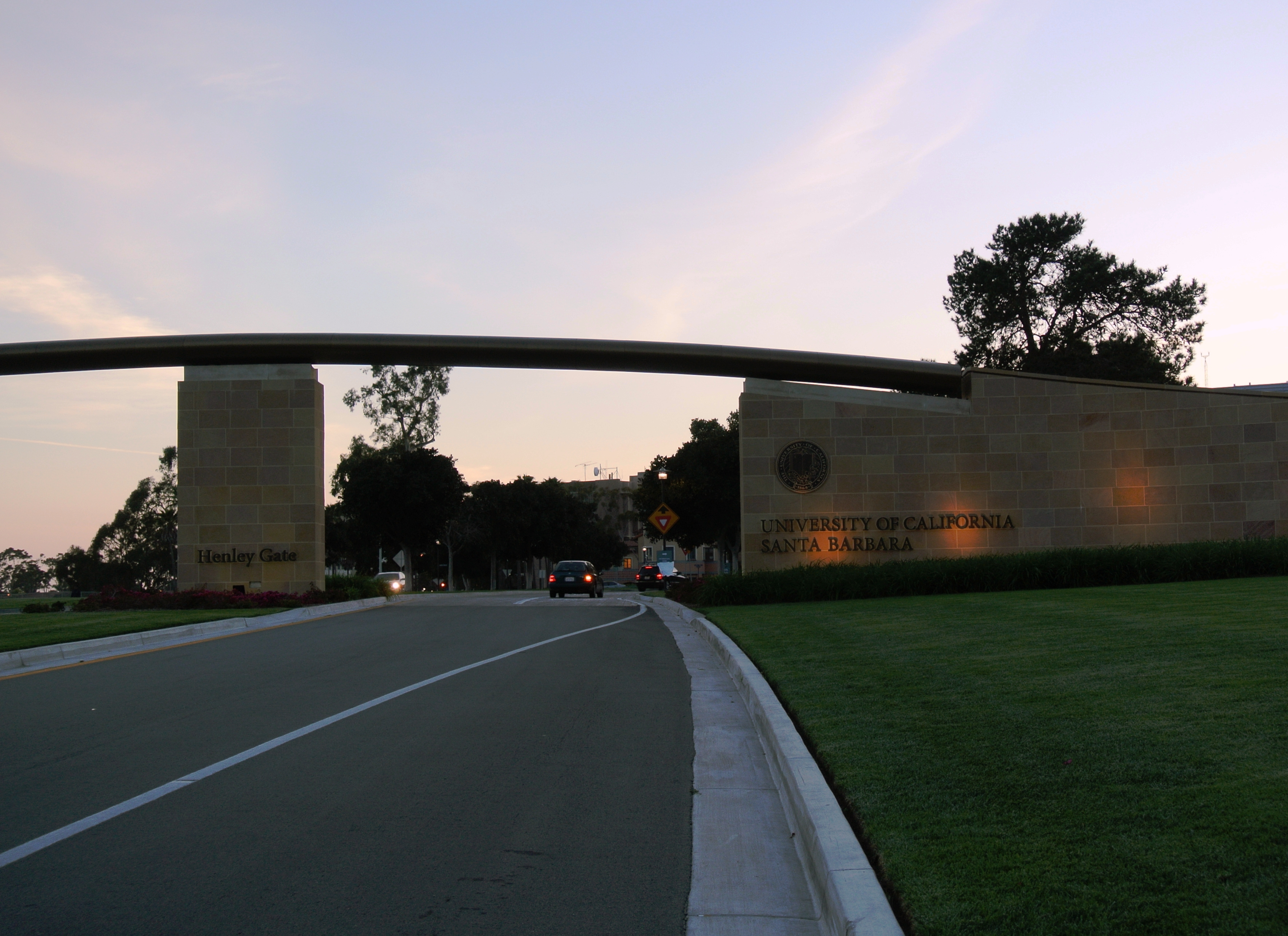
Henley Gate (eastern entrance) at dawn

The University of California, Santa Barbara is located on cliffs directly above the Pacific Ocean. UCSB's campus is autonomous from local government and has not been annexed by the city of Santa Barbara. A parcel of the City of Santa Barbara that forms a strip of through the ocean to the Santa Barbara airport, runs through the west entrance to the university campus. UCSB has a Santa Barbara mailing address, as do other unincorporated areas around the city. The campus is divided into four parts: the Main (East) Campus of 708 acres (287 ha), which houses all academic units plus the majority of undergraduate housing, Storke Campus, West Campus, and North Campus. The campuses surround the community of Isla Vista.

UCSB is one of the few universities in the United States with its own beach. The campus, bordered on three sides by the Pacific Ocean, has miles of coastline as well as its own lagoon. Goleta Point, also known as Campus Point, is a rocky extension into the ocean. The campus has numerous walking and bicycle paths across campus, around the lagoon, and along the beach.

Much of the campus's early architecture was designed by architect William Pereira and his partner Charles Luckman, and made heavy use of custom tinted and patterned concrete blocks. This design element was carried over into many of the school's subsequent buildings. Many of the older campus buildings are being replaced with newer, more modern facilities.

The lagoon is a large body of water adjacent to the coastline, between San Rafael and San Miguel Residence Halls. It was created from a former tidal salt marsh flat and is fed by a combination of run-off and ocean water used by the Marine Science Building's aquatic life tanks; thus, it is a combination of fresh and salt water.

=== Layout ===
The university is divided into two physical campuses, a West Campus and East Campus. The vast majority of university facilities, including all lecture halls and laboratories, are in the East Campus. The two campuses are connected by a large strip (known as the North and Storke Campuses) to the north which contains university housing and athletic fields. Thus, the university surrounds Isla Vista on three sides.

West Campus, aside from a few buildings dedicated to faculty housing, has largely been leased out to private organizations and includes a school for the mentally disabled and a large nature preserve. The largest sand dunes on the south-facing coast of the Santa Barbara Channel are located here.

The East Campus centers around two quadrangles, separated from each other by the main library and bus circle, and the life sciences buildings. Along the western quad are Storke Plaza and buildings housing the various arts, social sciences, and humanities departments. The Student Resource Building and the Events Center are also located along this quad. Surrounding the wider, park-like eastern quad are buildings housing the physical sciences departments and the College of Engineering. Directly to the south of, but not adjacent to, the eastern quad are the life sciences and psychology departments, as well as most of the on-campus housing. The southernmost section of the campus is dominated by the lagoon. The peninsula extending from the beach into the lagoon contains an elaborate labyrinth.

=== Bicycles ===
UCSB is known for its extensive biking system. Bicycles have exclusive right of way on paths throughout East Campus. Bicycle stands and lockers are ubiquitous. UCSB is unique among bicycle-heavy areas in that most travel is done within a small radius.

== Buildings and structures ==
=== Davidson Library ===
The UCSB Libraries, consisting of the Davidson Library and the Arts Library reached 3 million bound volumes in 2010. The Donald C. Davidson Library is named after Donald C. Davidson, who was a University Librarian from 1947 to 1977. It is UCSB's main library, holding the general collection and several special collections: The Sciences and Engineering Library, the Map and Imagery Laboratory, the Curriculum Laboratory, the East Asian Library, and the Ethnic and Gender Studies Library. The university's Department of Special Collections is also part of the Davidson Library. The Special Collections hold rare books and manuscripts and several collections, which include the Performing Arts Collection, the Wyles Collection on the American West, the Skofield Printers' Collection, and the California Ethnic and Multicultural Archives.

=== Storke Tower ===
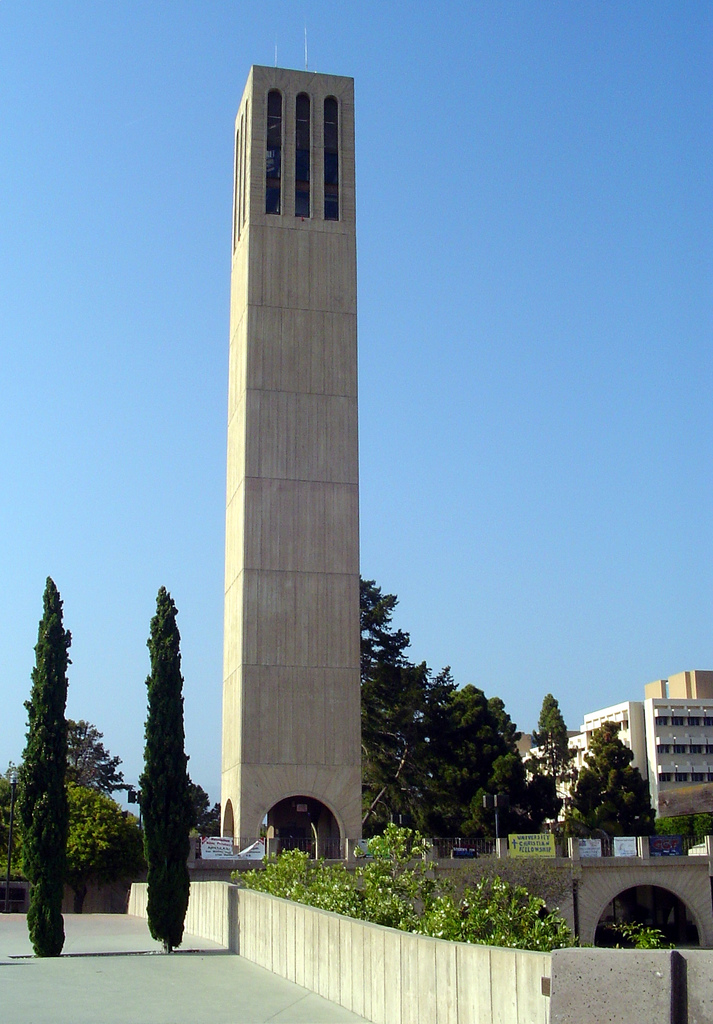
Storke Tower

Storke Tower is a landmark campanile (bell and clock tower) located in the center of the UCSB campus. It can be seen from most places on campus, and it overlooks Storke Plaza. Dedicated for use on September 28, 1969, the 61-bell carillon tower stands 175 ft (53 m) tall. The bells range in size from 13 to 4,793 pounds, with the largest bell carrying the university seal and university motto.

Storke Tower is the tallest steel/cement structure in Santa Barbara County.

=== Ocean Science Education building ===
The new Ocean Science Education building will house the Outreach Center for Teaching Ocean Science (OCTOS) and incorporate the educational outreach program of UCSB's Marine Science Institute (MS) and the Channel Islands National Marine Sanctuary (CSMS) OCTOS is designed to expand science education for kindergarten through 12th graders. It will also provide opportunities for undergraduate and graduate students, who will be voluntary guides, to learn about teaching science.

The project will cost an estimated $20 million, $8 million of which has already been provided by the federal government. The remaining $12 million will reportedly be made available through private funds raised by the university. The building was supposed to be completed in August 2011 but the university terminated their contract with their contractor because he was many months behind schedule and did not complete the building by the projected date. So at this time, the project remains unfinished.

=== Art, Design and Architecture Museum ===
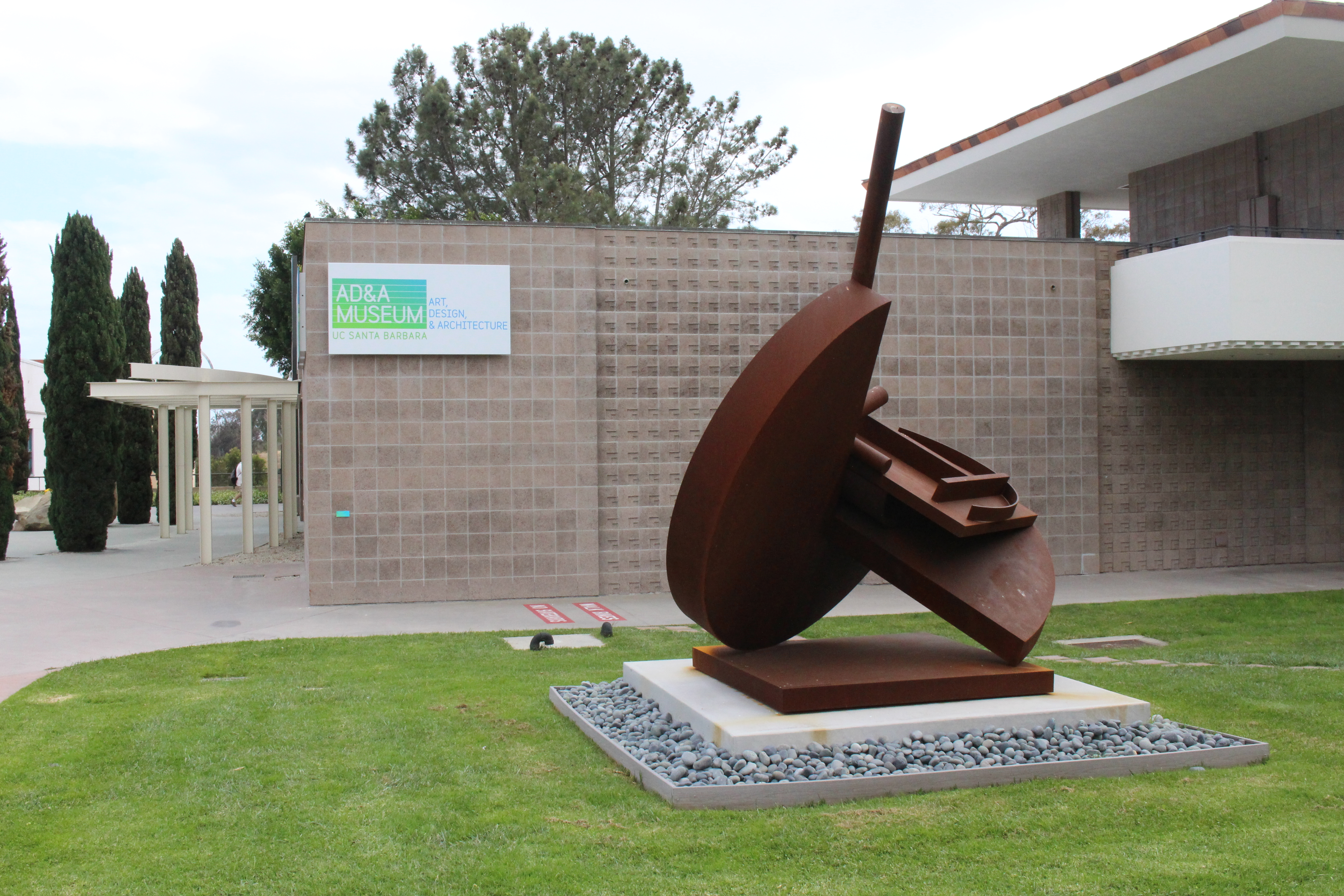
Art, Design and Architecture Museum

The Art, Design and Architecture Museum was built in 1959, the museum was originally a gallery for art education at UC Santa Barbara. Today the AD&A contains a fine art collection of over 8,500 works.

Other than the 8,500 original works the AD&A also possesses over 1,000,000 architectural drawings, historic photographs, writings, scrapbooks, and three-dimensional objects in the Architecture and Design Collection.

The museum's digital collections were enhanced during the COVID-19 crisis so they were accessible while quarantine was in place.
