= Ruben Castaneda =

Reporter and author

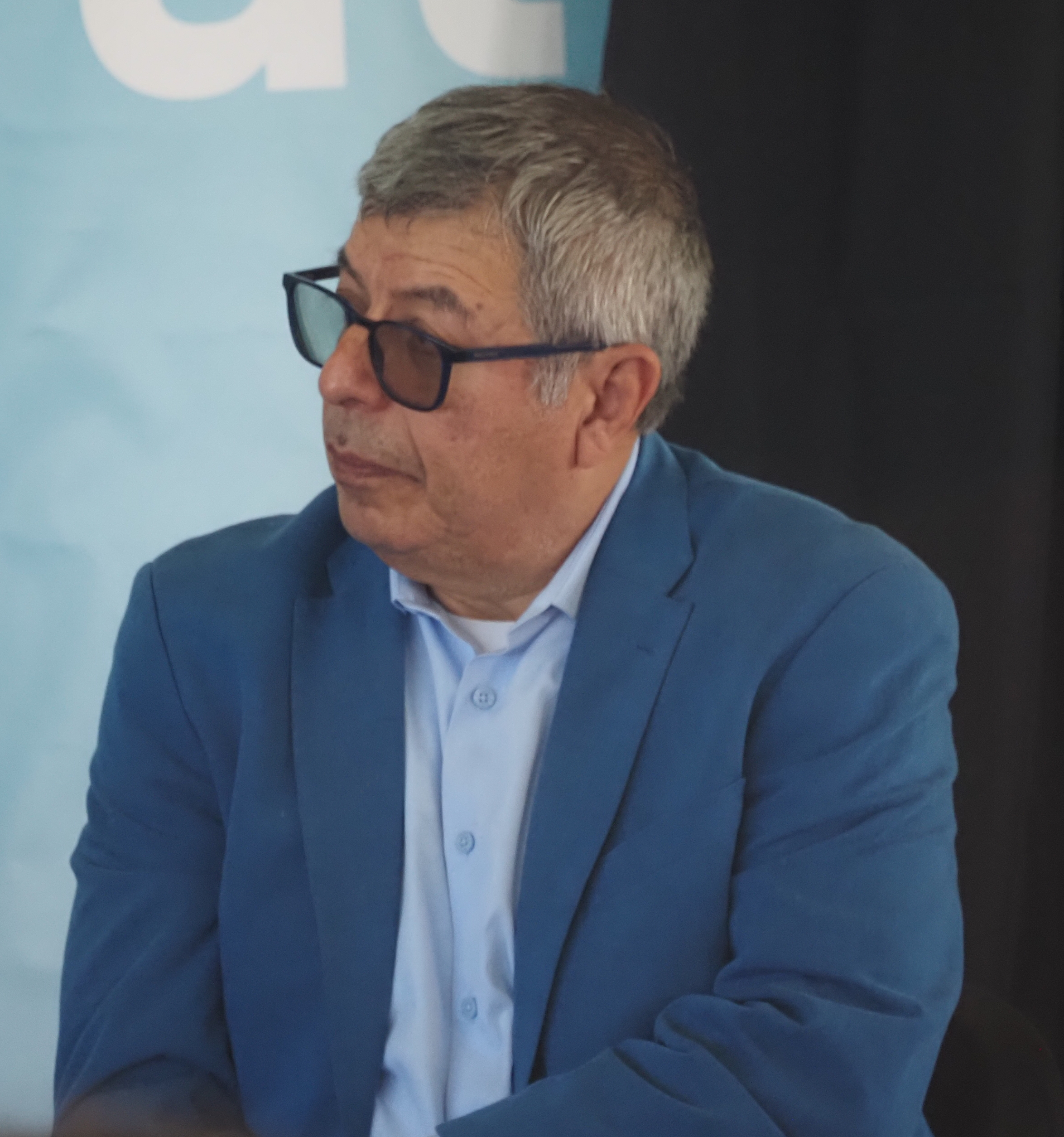
- at the 2026 Gaithersburg Book Festival
- Born: 1961 (age 64–65); Los Angeles
- Occupations: Journalist, author

Ruben Castaneda (born 1961) is a former reporter for the Washington Post and author of the memoir S Street Rising: Crack, Murder, and Redemption in D.C.

== Life ==
Castaneda was born and raised in Los Angeles, the son of a gas company worker and a homemaker. He is the eldest of five children.

After working at the Los Angeles Herald Examiner he was hired by the Washington Post in 1989 where he became a crime beat reporter in Washington, D. C. There he covered the height of DC's crack epidemic which saw over 400 murders a year, among the highest murder rate in the country. Castaneda later moved to cover Prince George's County, Maryland court room stories where he was instrumental in exposing widespread police brutality by the Prince George's County Police Department.

Castaneda left the Post in 2011 and worked on his memoir S Street Rising: Crack, Murder, and Redemption in D.C. (2014). In the memoir Castaneda explains that while he was working as a journalist for the Post he was also secretly buying and using crack himself, often from the same neighborhoods and people he was reporting on during the day. Castaneda has been clean since 1992.

He was a writer for US News and World Report. He is an editor at The Baltimore Sun.

Castaneda has won or shared in several journalism awards. He was one of two first-place winners for "Feature Writing" in the Washington-Baltimore Newspaper Guild's Front Page Awards (2007), for "Cracked" published in the Post.

== Works ==
- "Coyote Hunt" in D.C. Noir (2006)
- S Street Rising: Crack, Murder, and Redemption in D.C. (2014)
