= Alfred Shea Addis =

American photographer (1832–1886)

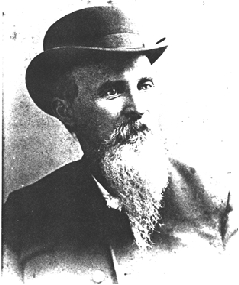
- Born: c. 1832; Philadelphia, Pennsylvania, U.S.
- Died: September 10, 1886 (aged 53–54); Chihuahua, Mexico
- Cause of death: Gunshot wound
- Occupation: Photographer
- Spouse: Sarah Short
- Children: Yda Hillis Addis, Judge Addis

Alfred Shea Addis (c. 1832 – September 10, 1886), also known as A.S. Addis, was an American Western itinerant photographer, mostly known for photographs of Kansas, Mexico, and the American Southwest.

== Early life ==
Born in Philadelphia, Pennsylvania in about 1832, Addis migrated to Lawrence, Kansas in 1850. He worked as a photographer's assistant for Thomas Short, learning the art of photography and gradually securing his own clients under Short's guidance. Addis later married Short's daughter, Sarah. They had two children, Yda Hillis Addis (born 1857) and Judge Addis (1862–1908). The families were Confederate sympathizers. When the situation in Lawrence became too violent, the Addis's and the Shorts moved to Leavenworth, Kansas, where they lived near the protection of the fort.

== Fort Leavenworth ==
Addis started his own photography business. He advertised "Photographs, Ambrotypes, Melainotypes. Photographs framed in Superior style. Pins and Lockets filled in best style. Call and give me a trial." At night he managed the Union Theater which he later purchased. As the potential for civil war heated up, the abolitionists increased their stronghold in Leavenworth and violence broke out there when Missouri seceded from the Union in November 1862, prompting Brigadier General James G. Blunt to proclaim martial law. In August 1863 the pro-slavery bushwhacker William Quantrill led a massacre of pro-Union citizens at Lawrence. Addis gave a benefit performance at the Union Theater, with the proceeds to go to the Lawrence victims. In January 1864, abolitionists burned down the Union Theater. The Shorts and the Addises, along with their slaves, fled to northern Mexico.

== Mexico ==
The Addises and Shorts first went to Chihuahua, where they found other Confederate sympathizers. Addis took photographs of the Mexican landscapes and the indigenous people and sold his cartes de visit to art dealers in New York. When he scouted for wilderness landscapes and exotic vistas to photograph, he often took along his daughter Yda to translate the Indian and Spanish languages to English. Addis moved his family further south into Mexico, looking for new views of native people and the country. By mule train the family migrated to Mazatlán and Hermosillo. After the Civil War ended, Addis took his family aboard the sailing ship The Orizaba for California.

== Return to the US and appointment as Deputy United States Marshal ==
In California, the Addises and the Shorts lived in a house located on Bunker Hill in Los Angeles. Yda and her younger brother attended school in the small Los Angeles School House. The women kept house and took in boarders.

When Addis heard of veins of gold and silver discovered in New Mexico and Nevada, he left Los Angeles for the mines, on the way, he photographed Indian tribes and bought real estate. When he moved to Tucson, Arizona, he was appointed United States Territorial Marshal. His son Charles also known as Judge, then a young man, joined his father in Tucson. An individual, Mr. Hutchinson, who worked with Addis and had gained his confidence, later swindled Addis and ran away to the Mexican State of Durango. Addis reported "I am after him and will put him in quad." Addis was shot by the thief and died.

== As a writer ==
Alfred Shea Addis a.k.a. A. S. Addis the well known itinerant photographer also wrote travel dispatches for several newspapers. He expressed strong opinions and observations of the people and the politics he experienced while traveling throughout the American Southwest; currently some could consider his language bigoted or even racist. Nevertheless, A. S. Addis ridiculed, and scolded the politicians and the American military. But in the late 19th century the manly use of language discussing politics, and society was different from the current "politically correct" point of view. The following example of A. S. Addis's travel writing was published in the book Evening Express (Los Angeles, California) January 26, 1880:

THE RED DEVILS Are again at their favorite work of killing and robbing. Major Morrow, with the colored troops, is after them, but as the noble reds don't fear the Buffalo Soldiers, as they call them, nobody will get "muchly" hurt. The universal opinion of those who live on the frontier is that colored troops are unfit for Indian service. Major Morrow, who is known by those who have been with him in action, to be a brave officer, has no chance whatever with the wily foe. For instance, a short time since, knowing himself to be near the foe, he gave the order to advance, and led off himself, when upon coming within sight of the reds, he turned to order an advance, and found that all his troops had found cover—he alone being exposed to fire; I imagine he felt as I did while traveling in Mexico. Some ninety persons thirsty being eighty miles in a desert, no water, no shelter to serve as refuge—nothing good worked out of it. The raids result from Indian agents' dishonesty and the difficulty appointing an honest man. This may seem harsh language, but 'tis true, as can be proven by late exposures in Arizona. Even Commissioner Hoyl had laws passed to work a mine on the reservation of San Carlos. They had one honest agent there—John Clum—who took the agency when in its worst plight, who fearlessly went to work and brought order out of chaos, compelled the Indians to behave themselves, organized Indians to fight Indians, fought and killed many of the bad ones, gave them what they were entitled to in annuities, and had peace for many months; but he was harassed by jealousy on the part of those who wanted his place until he resigned. Another was appointed to his place who in a few months, was court-martialed for dishonest. Immediately after the ejection of Clum….

== Legacy ==
Addis was a prolific photographer and his work appears in many private and public collections; however, cartes de visites, cabinet cards, stereographs and photographs with his imprints are relatively uncommon.
