= Scot J. Paltrow =

American journalist

Scot J. Paltrow is an American journalist. In a career devoted to investigative reporting, Paltrow worked for the Washington bureaus of The Los Angeles Times, The Wall Street Journal, then Reuters global investigative group.

Paltrow is from New York. He received his bachelor's degree from the Cornell University College of Arts and Sciences and a master's degree from the London School of Economics.

Paltrow's journalism career began in 1977 when he joined the Memphis Commercial Appeal as a reporter. The following year, he joined the Los Angeles Herald-Examiner, where his investigative series on corruption in Industry, California, "The City of Insiders," resulted in federal and state criminal probes and several convictions.

In 1981, Paltrow moved to the Washington Star, where he covered federal courts. After the Star shut down the same year, Paltrow moved to the Wall Street Journal, where he was a reporter in the Los Angeles bureau. In 1985, Paltrow became a European correspondent for the Journal based in Brussels. In April 1988, Paltrow returned to the United States as New York financial bureau chief for the Los Angeles Times. During this period he did numerous investigative stories on Wall Street investment banks, markets and the insurance industry." While at the Times, Paltrow won a 1993 George Polk Award for Financial Reporting. Paltrow returned to the Wall Street Journal in May 1997 and served as senior special writer based in New York and writes for the paper's Washington bureau.

In 2007, following Rupert Murdoch's purchase of Dow Jones & Company (which owns the Wall Street Journal), Paltrow left the paper and joined Condé Nast's Portfolio.com as a contributing editor, starting September 1, 2007, following another longtime Journal journalist who moved to Portfolio.com, Peter Waldman.

In September 2010, Paltrow moved to Reuters, where he and fellow financial journalist Mark Hosenball were brought on as "key hires" in an effort to expand Reuters' "coverage of business, Wall Street and Washington." Paltrow joined Reuters to cover "financial crimes, specifically covering criminal and civil investigations related to the 2008 financial crisis, as well as the effort to more closely regulate and police the financial world." In 2012, Paltrow won a Society of American Business Editors and Writers Best in Business Awards in the Explanatory/News Agency category for his investigation into banks' use of robo-signing.

Paltrow has written a report, The Case for a Stronger Federal Role in Insurance Regulation: Weak State Regulation Highlights the Need for Federal Oversight of Health Premiums, for the Center for American Progress Action Fund.

Paltrow has received the 1994 Gerald Loeb Award for Large Newspapers for an investigative series on Prudential Securities. Paltrow won 1992 and 1993 John Hancock Awards for Excellence in Business & Financial Journalism, the 1994 Los Angeles Times Editorial Award, the Unity Award in Media, and a 2001 Deadline Club Award from New York City Chapter of the Society of Professional Journalists.
