= Gilmore Millen =

William Gilmore Millen was an American newspaper reporter, copy editor, and later novelist. His novel, Sweet Man won significant acclaim when it was published in 1930.

== Early life ==
Millen was born October 22, 1896, in Memphis, to James Knox Millen Sr. and Matilda Haupt Millen. He was one of five children; his brother James Knox Millen was a playwright whose works "Never No More" (1932) and "The Bough Breaks" (1937) were produced in New York.

Before moving to Los Angeles in 1923, he wrote for the Memphis newspaper The Commercial Appeal.

== Newspaper career ==
As a newspaper reporter and rewrite man, Millen worked for the Los Angeles Herald and later for the Los Angeles Herald-Express.

== Sweet Man and other works ==
Millen's first and only novel, Sweet Man, was published in 1930 by Viking Press. A picaresque novel with a mixed race protagonist, it explored controversial themes of miscegenation and economic exploitation under Jim Crow. It was praised at the time for its depiction of Black communities and its use of what was deemed to be accurate African-American dialect.

In late 1930, Millen was hired as a contract writer by Metro-Goldwyn-Mayer. During his tenure, he is known to have collaborated with Lou Edelman and Edgar Allen Woolf on the screenplay for a vehicle for Buster Keaton. The script survives but was never produced.

He married Phyllis Holton in mid-1937, less than a month before his death.

== Death ==
On May 26, 1937, Millen is believed to have fallen asleep while smoking in bed; in the resulting apartment fire, he sustained critical third degree burns. He died at age 40 on June 5, 1937, in Los Angeles. His body was transported to Memphis, where it was buried at Forest Hill Cemetery.
