= Mexican Herald =

English-language daily newspaper in Mexico City (1895–1915)

The Mexican Herald
- Masthead of the second issue, September 2, 1895
- Type: Daily newspaper
- Founder: Frederic R. Guernsey (Note: Knudson gives his name as Frederick J. Guernsey; Fernández Fernández gives Frederic R. Guernsey.)
- Publisher: Mexican Publishing Company
- President: Paul Hudson (from 1908)
- Editor: Frederic R. Guernsey
- General manager: Paul Hudson (from 1896)
- Founded: September 1, 1895
- Ceased publication: October 29, 1915
- Language: English
- Headquarters: Mexico City (Veracruz, April–August 1914)
- Circulation: 10,000 (estimate)
- Sister newspapers: El Heraldo Mexicano (Spanish-language evening edition, 1910)
- OCLC number: 310357205

The Mexican Herald was an English-language daily newspaper published in Mexico City from 1895 to 1915. It was founded by the American journalist Frederic R. Guernsey and managed from 1896 by Paul Hudson. Its readers were mainly the American business community in Mexico, and during the Porfiriato it was closely aligned with the government of Porfirio Díaz. It opposed the government of Francisco I. Madero, welcomed the coup of Victoriano Huerta in 1913, and was closed on the orders of Venustiano Carranza in October 1915.

== History ==
=== Founding ===
Guernsey had worked for the Boston Herald and came to Mexico with the Boston investors who financed the Mexican Central Railway. The first issue of the Mexican Herald appeared on September 1, 1895. It carried the full Associated Press service from the start, the first newspaper in Mexico to do so, and in 1906 it joined El Diario and El Imparcial in setting up the agency's bureau in the capital. It usually ran to four pages, with few advertisements.

Most of its readers were Americans living in Mexico, who numbered 20,639 in the census of 1910. With an estimated circulation of 10,000, the paper may have reached nearly every American household in the country. By 1910 Hudson claimed that a third of its readers were Mexican. Its English-language rival in the 1890s was The Two Republics. During the Spanish–American War of 1898, when the newspapers of the Spanish community and the French-language Courier du Mexique attacked the United States, the American community replied through the Herald, The Two Republics, The Evening Telegram and The Mexican Financier.

=== Under Paul Hudson ===
Paul Hudson arrived in Mexico in October 1896 to manage the paper and became president of the company in 1908. Guernsey was still chief editor in 1908. Under Hudson the Herald took on a semi-official character, speaking for both the American colony and the Díaz government. According to Fernández Fernández, it received a government subsidy of US$12,000 a year. The British writer Henry Baerlein in 1914 and the American journalist Carleton Beals in 1932 also described it as subsidized, while the historian Charles C. Cumberland wrote that the allegations were never proved. The Council of Administration of the American Colony, an unofficial governing body of the community, met in the paper's club room.

On February 28, 1908, the Herald became the first newspaper in Mexico City to reprint James Creelman's interview with Díaz from Pearson's Magazine, in which Díaz said he would welcome an opposition party and would not run again in 1910; El Imparcial published a Spanish translation on March 3. The journalist John Kenneth Turner worked as a reporter for the paper in the spring of 1909.

=== Revolution ===
Front page of February 19, 1913, reporting the overthrow of Madero

In 1910 a crowd stoned the paper's building. That autumn, shortly before the outbreak of the Mexican Revolution, the Herald launched a Spanish-language evening edition, El Heraldo Mexicano. (Note: Knudson dates its first issue to October 24, 1910; Fernández Fernández places it in November 1910.) After Madero came to power and withdrew the subsidy, the paper turned against his government. Emiliano Zapata was a frequent target. The Herald ran banner headlines such as "Zapata Is Rearming" (June 20, 1911) and, after the Plan of Ayala, "Troops Ordered to Fight Zapata to a Finish Now" (November 14, 1911). It also printed atrocity stories about the Zapatistas, some of them of the kind that, according to historians, Morelos landowners paid writers to invent.

During the Ten Tragic Days of February 1913 Hudson and his family took refuge in the newspaper's offices; the paper missed only the issue of February 13. According to Knudson, it greeted Huerta's coup with the words "After a year of anarchy, a military dictator looks good to Mexico". The Zapatista paper El Renovador later alleged that Hudson had been paid to lobby in Washington for recognition of the Huerta government, and that he had signed, with some thirty other American residents, a petition urging that recognition.

The Herald welcomed the United States occupation of Veracruz in April 1914 and called for American forces to occupy the rest of the country. It stopped publishing in the capital in late April and from April 25 was printed in Veracruz on the presses of the Catholic newspaper La Opinión, returning to Mexico City on August 1. (Note: Fernández Fernández gives April 23 as the date of the last issue in the capital; Knudson writes that the paper did not publish from April 21 to 25.) After Huerta's fall its tone towards the Zapatistas softened, and it described their entry into the capital in November 1914 as orderly.

=== Closure ===
The last issue, October 29, 1915

Hudson was arrested in December 1914 and released after diplomatic intervention. In July 1915 Zapatista troops occupied the Herald building and used its presses to print El Renovador. After Carranza's forces took the capital, he ordered the paper closed for having supported Huerta and declared Hudson persona non grata. The last issue, 21st year, No. 7,344, is dated October 29, 1915. (Note: Fernández Fernández gives the date of the last issue as Friday, October 25, 1915; the surviving issue is dated Friday, October 29, and the New York Times reported the closure on October 31.) Hudson asked for permission to resume publication in 1917 but did not receive it.

== Assessment ==
The journalism historian Jerry W. Knudson described the Herald as an "outpost of empire" that existed to attract and protect American investment and never understood the Revolution; he notes that it came to share William Randolph Hearst's call for the annexation of Mexico. Joshua Salyers argued that its editors promoted a picture of Mexico as a modern nation modelled on the United States, within a Pan-American "community of modern nations". Íñigo Fernández Fernández called it the most important foreign-language newspaper in the country, and found that between 1911 and 1913 its editorial line moved towards calls for American intervention.

== Archives ==
The Library of Congress holds the paper on microfilm. The Center for Research Libraries has digitized the run from September 1895 to October 1915, which is also available through NewsBank's World Newspaper Archive.

== See also ==
- The Two Republics
