= Mark Schwed =

American journalist

Mark Schwed (September 24, 1955 – January, 31 2008) was an American television critic, journalist and actor. He worked for The Palm Beach Post for 11 years and also as a critic for the Los Angeles Herald Examiner. Associate editor of The Palm Beach Post Jan Tuckwood said Schwed "Had a great instinct for what we call the quick-turn human-interest story".

Schwed died on January 31, 2008, of undisclosed causes. Schwed appeared fine until the beginning of the week when he called in work ill.
