= Lin Loring =

- College: University of California, Santa Barbara

Coaching career (1973–2017)
- UC Santa Barbara (1973–1977); Indiana Hoosiers (1977–2017)

Coaching awards and records
- Awards National Coach of the Year (x2); 1982 AIAW National Champions Records NCAA D–I women's tennis career wins leader (846)

Lin Loring is a former college tennis coach. He is the winningest head coach in NCAA Division I women's tennis history and was twice named national coach of the year. He started his collegiate coaching career with the UC Santa Barbara Gauchos and spent five decades with the Indiana Hoosiers. He was inducted into the ITA Women’s Collegiate Tennis Hall of Fame.

== Early life and education ==
Loring attended the University of California, Santa Barbara. While enrolled, he was a sportswriter for El Gaucho, the campus newspaper, and was a member of Phi Sigma Kappa.

== Coaching career ==
=== UC Santa Barbara ===
Loring became the part-time head coach of the UC Santa Barbara Gauchos women's tennis team in 1973. He led UCSB to national prominence, despite the program not having full scholarships. He was controversially not renewed by athletic director Al Negratti while he and the women's team was away at a regional tournament in 1977. When Negratti made the head coaching position full time, he instead hired Darlene Koenig. He finished his UCSB career with a 42–17 coaching record.

=== Indiana University ===
Following his departure from UC Santa Barbara, Loring was named head coach of the Indiana Hoosiers women's tennis team later that year. He led the team to the 1982 Association for Intercollegiate Athletics for Women championships, the first women's national championship for the university. He retired from his position in 2017 as the all-time winningest coach in NCAA Division I women's tennis history with 846 wins, all but 42 of them with Indiana. Upon his retirement, athletic director Fred Glass said Loring had "...one of the most exemplary careers in the storied history of IU Athletics."

Loring was named as an inductee to the 2021 class of the ITA Women’s Collegiate Tennis Hall of Fame.
