= Two Republics =

English-language newspaper in Mexico City (1867–1900)

The Two Republics
- Masthead, January 1, 1870
- Type: Weekly, later also daily
- Founder: George W. Clarke
- Publisher: George W. Clarke; later J. Mastella Clarke
- Editor: George W. Clarke; J. Mastella Clarke (1880s)
- Founded: July 1867 (Note: The Library of Congress gives July 27, 1867 as the date of the first issue; the Center for Research Libraries record says the paper began with the issue for July 1, 1867. The second issue is dated August 4, 1867. Costeloe dates its appearance to 1868.)
- Ceased publication: 1900
- Language: English, with some Spanish
- Headquarters: Mexico City
- Circulation: 150 subscribers (as of 1869)
- OCLC number: 456575959

The Two Republics was an English-language newspaper published in Mexico City from 1867 to 1900. It was founded by George W. Clarke after the fall of the Second Mexican Empire, and was later owned and edited by J. Mastella Clarke. It was printed mostly in English, with some content in Spanish.

== History ==
The original masthead, August 4, 1867

The paper first appeared in July 1867. According to the historian Michael Costeloe, its launch was at least partly a response to the arrival of English-speaking engineers and others who came to work for the newly established railway and other companies. It was published on Saturdays, and its masthead carried the motto "A free press is the most certain promoter, as it is the safest guardian of a healthy public opinion". In 1870 a year's subscription cost $10 in the city and $12 by mail, and the publisher's address was Capuchinas No. 14. Library catalogues record a semiweekly schedule between 1868 and 1869 and a daily edition, but do not give dates for the daily.

Terms of publication, January 1, 1870

Under George W. Clarke the paper carried regular reports on the matches of the Mexico City Cricket Club, which many of the newly arrived English speakers had joined, as well as announcements of fixtures and published score sheets. In 1869 the paper had about 150 subscribers, against 400 for the French-language Le Trait d'Union and about 1,000 each for El Monitor Republicano and La Opinión Nacional. By 1887 it was printing about 800 copies.

In the early 1880s The Two Republics was owned and edited by J. Mastella Clarke. Frederick A. Ober, writing in 1884, counted 283 newspapers in Mexico in 1882, two of them in English: The Two Republics and the bilingual weekly The Mexican Financier. The historian Lilia Vieyra Sánchez has studied the paper's commercial advertising during the presidency of Manuel González (1880–1884).

In the 1890s the paper published a column of foreign news under the heading "Special Services of The Two Republics", with cables from Europe received by way of Galveston; in 1895 it used them to report on the trials of Oscar Wilde. During the Spanish–American War in 1898, when parts of the capital's foreign-language press, among them the French Courier du Mexique, attacked the United States, the American community replied through The Mexican Herald, The Two Republics, The Evening Telegram and The Mexican Financier.

The Two Republics ceased publication in 1900. The holdings of the Center for Research Libraries end with the issue of November 17, 1900.

== Archives ==
Issues are held on microfilm by the Library of Congress and the University of Illinois Urbana-Champaign library. Digitized issues are available through the Center for Research Libraries and NewsBank's World Newspaper Archive, and issues from the 1890s through the Hemeroteca Nacional Digital de México of the National Autonomous University of Mexico.

== See also ==
- Mexican Herald
