= Los Angeles Herald =

Newspaper in California, US (1873–1931)

Los Angeles Evening Herald
- Los Angeles Herald front page (May 30, 1916)
- Type: Evening daily newspaper
- Format: Print
- Founder: Charles A. Storke
- Founded: Los Angeles Herald (1873–1931).; Merged with Los Angeles Express (1871–1931) to form Los Angeles Herald-Express (1931–1962).; In 1963, Los Angeles Herald Express merged with Los Angeles Examiner (1903–1962) to form Los Angeles Herald Examiner (1963 – November 2, 1989)
- Language: English
- ISSN: 2166-5494
- OCLC number: 10846394
- Free online archives: cdnc.ucr.edu (1873-1927)

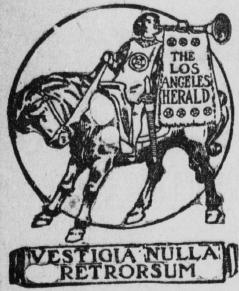
A herald on horseback representing the Los Angeles Herald (March 16, 1909 morning edition, page 4)

The Los Angeles Herald or the Evening Herald was a newspaper published in Los Angeles in the late 19th and early 20th centuries. Founded in 1873 by Charles A. Storke, the newspaper was acquired by William Randolph Hearst in 1931. It merged with the Los Angeles Express and became an evening newspaper known as the Los Angeles Herald-Express. A 1962 combination with Hearst's morning Los Angeles Examiner resulted in its final incarnation as the evening Los Angeles Herald-Examiner.

== History ==
Established in 1873, the Los Angeles Herald represented the largely Democratic views of the city and focused primarily on issues local to Los Angeles and Southern California. Appealing to a mostly working-class audience during its 116 years of publication, the Herald evolved from a primary focus on agriculture to reporting extensively on Hollywood gossip and local scandal, reflecting the transformation of Los Angeles itself during the twentieth century.

The Los Angeles Daily Herald was first published on October 2, 1873, by Charles A. Storke. It was the first newspaper in Southern California to use the innovative steam press; the newspaper's offices at 125 South Broadway were popular with the public because large windows on the ground floor allowed passersby to see the presses in motion.

Storke lost the paper to creditors, who together formed the Los Angeles City and County Publishing Company in 1874. The Herald continued to focus on local news, including agriculture, business, and culture.

Under the leadership of Robert M. Widney, the paper dramatically increased its circulation. Widney interviewed local farmers and business owners for his reports. The Los Angeles Weekly Herald, making use of this material, sold more than a thousand copies a week.

Beginning in 1913 and guided by Hearst-trained editors Edwin R. Collins and John B. T. Campbell, the local coverage for which the Herald was known began to emphasize scandal, crime, and the emerging motion-picture industry. By the 1920s, editors Wes Barr and James H. Richardson were so well known for their investigative reporting that they became the prototypes for the morally ambiguous, chain-smoking reporters who figured in so many film noir movies of the 1930s.

In 1922, the Herald officially joined the Hearst News empire, although several sources suggest that Hearst had secretly purchased the paper in 1911, when Collins and Campbell took the helm.
