= Storke Tower =

Bell tower in Santa Barbara, California, US

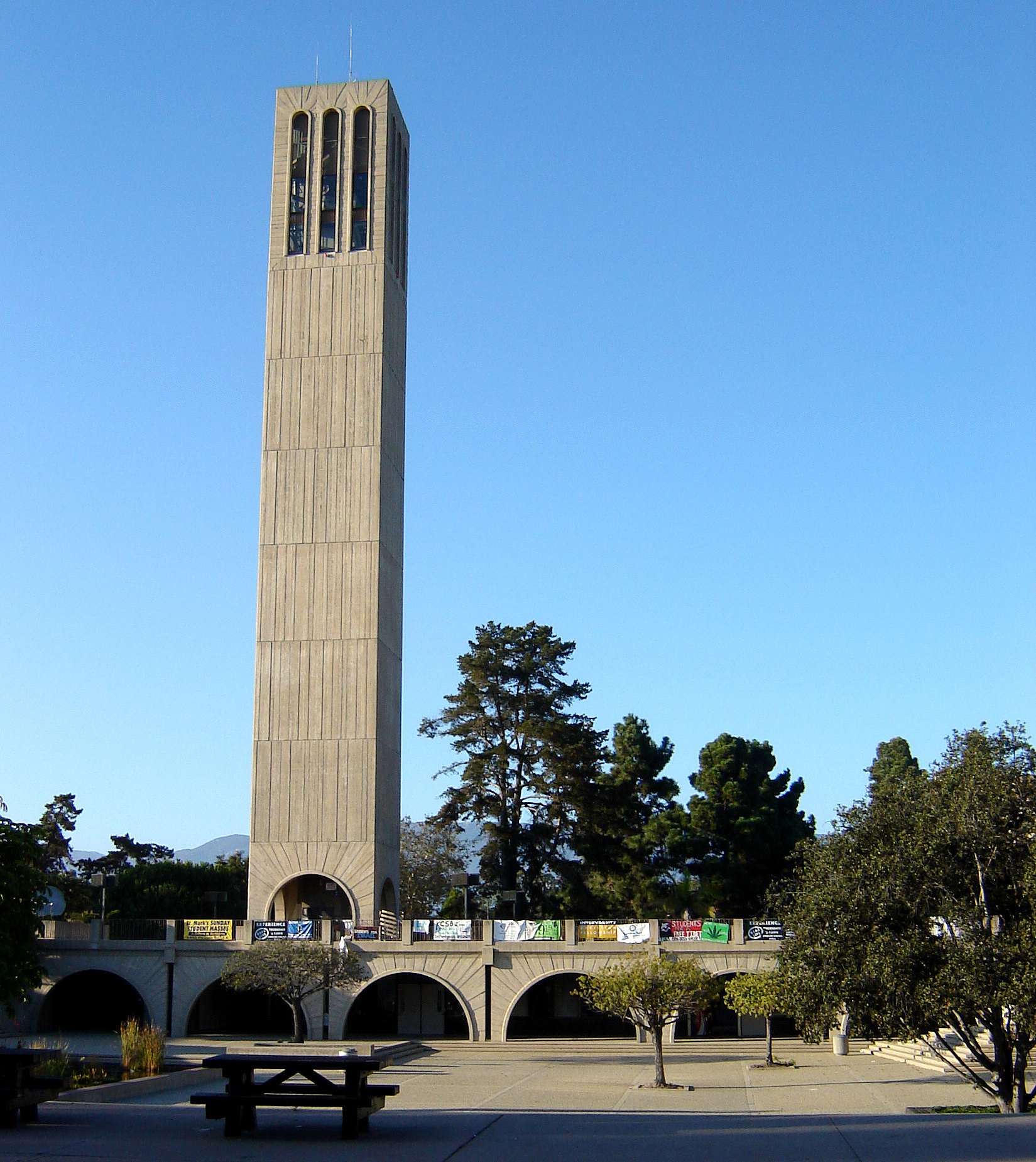
- Storke Tower seen from the UCen

General information
- Type: Campanile (bell tower)
- Location: University of California, Santa Barbara, Santa Barbara County, California
- Coordinates: 34.41260°N 119.84825°W
- Named for: Thomas M. Storke
- Completed: 1969
- Opened: September 28, 1969 (dedicated)
- Owner: University of California

Height
- Height: 175 ft (53 m)

Design and construction
- Architecture firm: Clark and Morgan

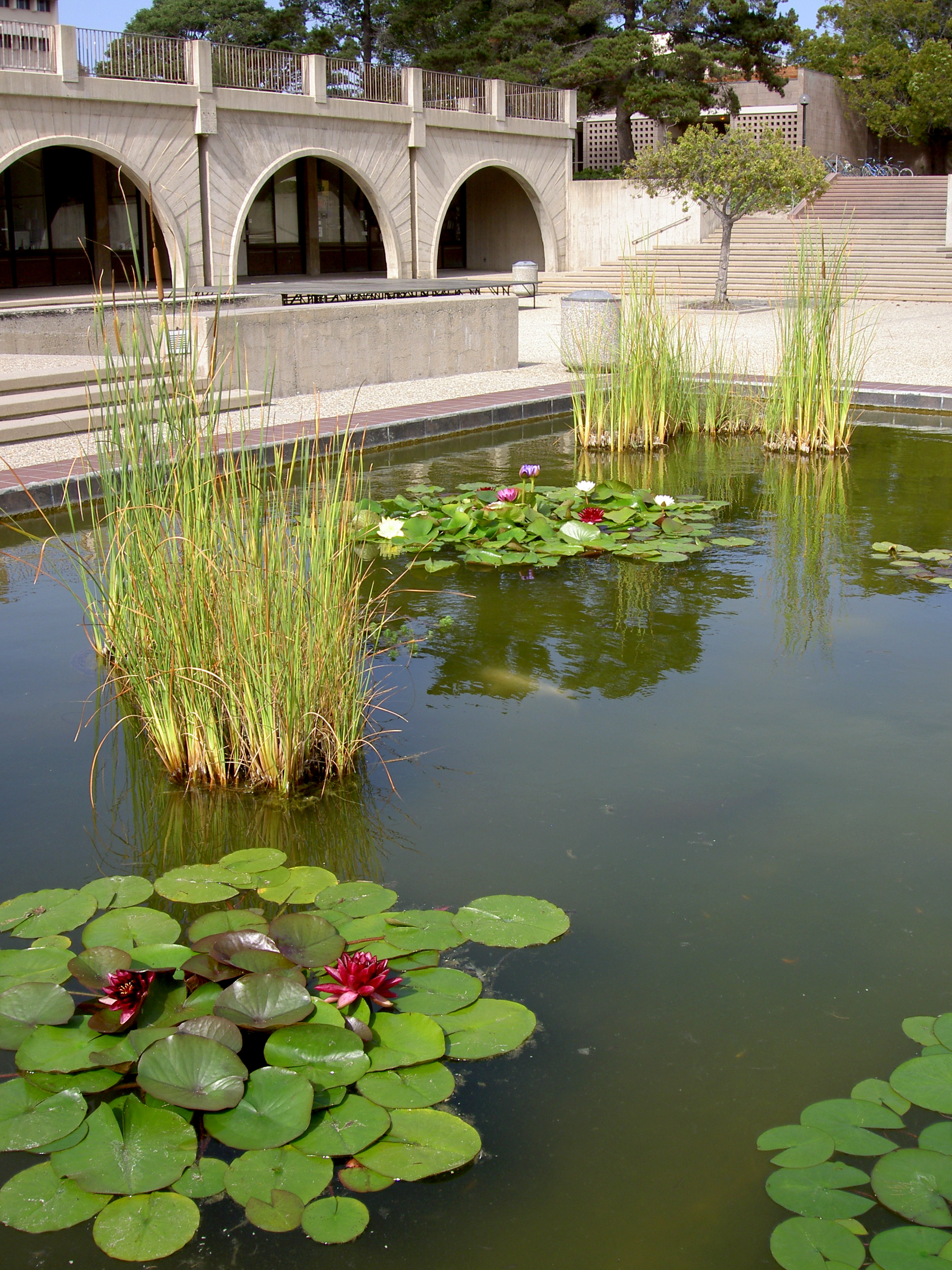
Storke Plaza pond, with koi and water lilies in a partially self-sustaining aquatic ecosystem

Storke Tower is a landmark campanile (bell tower) located on the campus of the University of California, Santa Barbara in the United States. Dedicated for use on September 28, 1969, the 61-bell carillon tower stands 175 ft (53 m) tall. It was designed by the San Francisco architecture firm Clark and Morgan.

== Structure ==
The bells range in size from 13 to 4,793 pounds, with the largest bell carrying the university seal and university motto. Other bells carry quotes and dedications, including "The University is not engaged in making ideas safe for students. It is engaged in making students safe for ideas" (Clark Kerr) and "These bells ring for the freedom of the press and in tribute to Editor-Publisher Thomas More Storke, whose affection for the University made this building possible." The tower has been affectionately known as "Storke's last erection" by students, reflecting both its unique profile and Thomas Storke's age at the time of its construction.

At every hour, an electronic control system plays the Westminster Quarters. The system also strikes a sequence at 10 minutes to every hour which spells out the university motto, "Let There Be Light" (with each of the 10 largest bells assigned a letter of the alphabet). The carillon suffered technical difficulties from 1994 to 1999, in 2004, and again in 2007.

Storke Tower is the tallest steel/cement structure in Santa Barbara County.

== History and use ==
The architects were the San Francisco firm Clark and Morgan, which was likely the firm of Hervey Parke Clark at the time. The tower is named for Thomas M. Storke, a Pulitzer Prize-winning journalist and U.S. senator who resided in Santa Barbara and helped found UCSB. He also contributed funds to the building of the tower and the Storke Communications Plaza, which is situated at the base of the tower.

The Plaza houses the university paper (the Daily Nexus), the radio station (KCSB-FM), and the yearbook office (La Cumbre Yearbook); the top of the tower supports cell phone signal transmitters and a KCSB radio antenna. The open-air area of the Plaza contains a large rectangular pond that functioned as a reflecting pool until 2003, when it was transformed into a cost-saving and partially self-sustaining aquatic ecosystem including koi and water lilies.

There have been occasional carillon recitals and courses in how to play the carillon. The tower has also been part of performance art projects.

Until 2008, UC Santa Barbara ROTC cadets used Storke Tower for mountaineering training, rappelling down the tower as a culmination exercise. This practice was discontinued by campus administrators for liability reasons citing student safety and ROTC policies prohibiting the physically disabled from participating in the exercise.

== See also ==
- List of carillons in the United States
