= John Schwada (journalist) =

American journalist

John Schwada is an American political-government and investigative reporter. After he won the Los Angeles Press Club's Lifetime Achievement Award in 2001, the Los Angeles City Council declared August 12, 2011 as John Schwada Day in the City of Los Angeles, although in July 2011, Schwada's contract with KTTV expired and was not renewed.

== Early life and education ==
Schwada was born in Columbia, Missouri. He earned a bachelor's degree in 1970 and a master's degree in history in 1975 from the University of California, Berkeley.

== Career ==
He began his career in journalism covering the Imperial Valley for the San Diego Union. After completing his master's degree he worked as a freelancer in the San Francisco Bay Area, then after moving to Los Angeles, worked at the Riverside Press-Enterprise for a year before being hired by the Los Angeles Herald-Examiner, where he was a political and City Hall reporter until the paper folded in November 1989. He was then hired by The Los Angeles Times, where he helped develop a weekly political column for the Valley Edition and covered politics and City Hall. He joined KTTV in 1996.

== Honors ==
While a freelancer, Schwada won the San Francisco Press Club award for best investigative story of the year for a San Francisco Bay Guardian piece on a CIA listening post in the Bay Area.

He was awarded a Los Angeles-area Emmy award in 2002 and 2003 and Golden Mikes in 2003 and 2010 for investigative reports. The LA Chapter of the Society of Professional Journalists named Schwada as its 1989 newspaper journalist of the year.

In the spring of 2009, Schwada and producer Pete Noyes were honored by The Sidney Hillman Foundation for their investigative reporting that led to the arrest of a con-man who was preying on victims of the 2008 Mortgage Crisis. Schwada was awarded the Associated Press TV and Radio Artists award for the best "light" blog of the year on a TV station website.

In the 1980s, Schwada won LA Press Club awards for his series investigating Councilman Richard Alatorre's illegal use of campaign money in his 1985 council race and for his investigation of Mayor Tom Bradley's questionable ties to Far East National Bank.

In 2011, he was honored with the LA Press Club's Lifetime Achievement award, and the Los Angeles City Council declared August 12, 2011 John Schwada Day. However, just days before he received his Lifetime Achievement Award, KTTV Fox 11 news director Jose Rios told Schwada his contract would not be renewed. Station General manager Kevin Hale declined to comment, but a source familiar with management's position said it wanted someone more "versatile", capable of anchoring and adept at the innumerable "live shots" that fill the news, particularly with the addition of a 5 p.m. show.
