= Daily Nexus =

Campus newspaper of UC Santa Barbara

Coordinates: 34°24′45.34″N 119°50′52.73″W

- Masthead for the Daily Nexus
- Type: Weekly student publication
- Format: Broadsheet
- School: University of California, Santa Barbara
- Editor-in-chief: Anusha Singh and Shayla Prasad
- Founded: 1931; 95 years ago (as The Eagle)
- Language: English
- Headquarters: Storke Tower plaza Santa Barbara, California, U.S.
- City: Santa Barbara, California
- Country: United States
- Website: dailynexus.com
- Free online archives: dailynexus.com/archives

The Daily Nexus is a campus newspaper at the University of California, Santa Barbara (UCSB).

Daily Nexus lineage can be traced to the Santa Barbara State College student newspaper, The Eagle, of the 1930s. After the college became part of the UC system in 1944, The Eagle evolved under different names — The Roadrunner, El Gaucho, The University Post and The Daily Gaucho. The modern Daily Nexus emerged from the activism and civil protests of the 1960s-1970s. The newspaper's editors changed the publication's name in 1970 to the Daily Nexus to "keep with the changing nature of the university" after protesters burned down the Bank of America building in Isla Vista, a UCSB community neighboring the campus. The 1970-71 editorial board drew inspiration from a quote by Robert Maynard Hutchins: "A free press is the nexus of any democracy".

Since then, the Daily Nexus has covered campus-related and county-wide news, sports, and arts. Students run the editorial side of the paper, independent of faculty or administration input or guidance. The editor-in-chief hires editorial staff and has the final word on what goes to print. Editors train and supervise staff writers and reporters. UCSB students work on the advertising and business side.

The Daily Nexus office is situated in the Storke Communications Plaza, beneath Storke Tower and next to the offices of KCSB-FM, the campus radio station. The Daily Nexus receives about two-thirds of its funds from advertising revenue. The other one-third is derived from a quarterly lock-in fee of $3.85 per student during the regular school year and $1.00 per student during the summer session. The lock-in fee is voted upon by students every two years.

== Publication history ==
The first iteration of the newspaper, The Eagle, was founded by Everett Gamage for the 1921–22 Santa Barbara State Teachers' College school year. It had a rocky start, highlighted by months of suspended publications, and faced a lack of funding and cooperation from the student body. The first year saw the paper use a mimeograph duplication process, which was changed in the second year for a printing process.

In 1986, while the paper was under the guidance of Editor-in-Chief William Diepenbrock, News Editor Steve Elzer broke the story that UCSB Chancellor Robert Huttenback was under investigation for misappropriating university funds. What initially had begun as an article on the sudden departure of a UCSB vice chancellor eventually ended in an exposé of Huttenback's financial activities. The Daily Nexus story drew other media coverage and intense university pressure for Huttenback to resign, which he did months later on July 11, 1986. Huttenback was convicted in 1988 for embezzling more than $170,000, primarily used for improvements to his home which he claimed was used for entertaining donors. A review of the incident by the UC President was declared moot and never officially released. The story was followed by newspapers throughout California, including the Los Angeles Times.

In 1996, while the paper was under the guidance of Editor-in-Chief Suzanne Garner, an investigation by campus editor Tim Molloy into the UC Regents' controversial vote to end Affirmative Action evolved into a lawsuit against California Governor Pete Wilson and the UC Regents. Represented by the ACLU, the Daily Nexus and Molloy alleged that the governor had initiated secret discussions among the Board to secure the outcome of the vote, in violation of the Bagley-Keene Open Meeting Act. The Nexus argued that its investigation was delayed because the governor had illegally denied requests for public information – but the suit finally was dismissed by the California Supreme Court for failure to file within the statute of limitations. No court ever reviewed the merits. Newspapers across the country followed the story.

On April 5, 2001, Brendan Buhler (editor in chief 2002–2004) interviewed The Hitchhiker's Guide to the Galaxy author Douglas Adams in what turned out to be Adams' final interview before he died. After being published in the Nexus, selections from Buhler's interview were published in Douglas' final book, The Salmon of Doubt. The excerpts were noted as having come from the Daily Nexus.

In 2002, Nexus staff writers Marisa Lagos and Jennifer B. Siverts provided daily coverage of the quadruple murder trial of David Attias, who, as a UCSB freshman on February 23, 2001, sped a car through the streets of Isla Vista, killing four people. In July 2002, a Santa Barbara jury found Attias guilty of second-degree murder but legally insane at the time of the incident. The Attias case was also covered by newspapers such as the Los Angeles Times and the San Francisco Chronicle. It also has been featured in multiple installments of the Dateline NBC news show.

The Daily Nexus publishes daily via its website; in 2014, it reduced its print edition to once a week.

== Awards and honors ==
Throughout its history, the Daily Nexus has earned awards and top rankings. In 2009, the Nexus was acknowledged by the California College Media Association in several areas, most notably ranking first for "Best Back to School/Orientation Issue". Nexus writer Evan Sherwood was acknowledged in the "Best Breaking News" category, and Allison Bailey and Evan Wagstaff took second place in the "Best Editorial" category. Sports writer Matt Connolly was also awarded third place in the category of "Best Sports Story". In 2011, Nexus managing editor Lexi Pandell received the California College Media Association's "Best Feature Story" award for a piece about five students who died from drug and alcohol-related accidents during an 18-month span.

In 2012 and 2013, the Daily Nexus placed 9th on The Princeton Review's list of "Best College Newspapers". It was the only UC newspaper on the list.

== Notable alumni ==
Some notable alumni of the Nexus (Position at Nexus):

- Steve Czaban - Radio personality. (Sports)
- Josh Elliott - ESPN SportsCenter anchor and former Sports Illustrated writer. (sports editor)
- Morgan J. Freeman - Director (ArtsWeek)
- Kazu Kibuishi - Graphic novel author and illustrator. (Art Director)
- Lin Loring - Winningest head coach in NCAA Division I women's tennis history. (sports writer)
- Jeff Nathanson - Screenwriter and film director
- Jason Ross - Emmy award-winning writer for The Daily Show. (News Editor/Editor in Chief)
- Christopher Scheer - Former editor at the San Francisco Examiner, managing editor of the alternative news site Alternet.
- Bob Sipchen - Former Los Angeles Times editor, winner of the Pulitzer Prize, adjunct professor at Occidental College's Dept. of English, UCSB's Distinguished Alumnus Award in 2006, author.
