= Charles A. Storke =

American politician

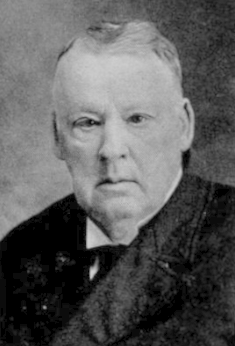

Member of the California State Assembly from the 74th district
- In office January 7, 1889 - January 5, 1891
- Preceded by: Russell Heath
- Succeeded by: W. A. Hawley

Member of the California State Assembly from the Santa Barbara County and Ventura County district
- In office January 8, 1883 - January 5, 1885
- Succeeded by: abolished

Personal details
- Born: November 19, 1847 Branchport, New York, US
- Died: December 6, 1936 (aged 89) Santa Barbara, California, US
- Party: Democratic
- Spouses: Martha Mary "Mattie" (m. 1873, unknown) Yda Hillis Addis (m. 1890; div. 1894)
- Children: Thomas M. Storke
- Education: Cornell University

Military service
- Branch/service: United States Army
- Battles/wars: American Civil War

Charles Albert Storke (November 19, 1847 – December 6, 1936) was a prominent lawyer in 19th century California.

== American Civil War ==
Charles Albert Storke was a soldier in the Union Army. He survived "the terrible slaughter of Cold Harbor, where, out of four companies, sixty-nine percent were killed, and the rest captured. The prisoners were sent to Libby, Andersonville, Savannah, and other prisons ...." Storke was discharged on May 26, 1865. He graduated from Cornell University in 1870.

== Early career ==
=== Teaching ===
After teaching for two years in Brooklyn, Storke moved to Santa Barbara, California, as a teacher on the bequest of Thomas Wallace More, a cattleman who had made his fortune during the California Gold Rush selling food to gold miners and who owned Rancho Sespe. Storke taught mathematics and Latin to local children, including More's daughter, Mattie. Impressed with the teenaged Mattie's good looks and her family's wealth, Storke proposed to her, and the two were married September 10, 1873. Storke lost interest in teaching once he realized he would never make much money in the occupation.

=== Newspaper publishing ===
Having worked as a printer's devil while attending Cornell, Storke understood that publishing was a lucrative and growing field. He borrowed money from his wealthy father-in-law to start a newspaper in Los Angeles. When the enterprise failed, he returned to Santa Barbara. He did not have money to start a new business and he owed his father-in-law a large sum of money. Having run out of options, he devoted his time to reading the law and became an attorney. He handled his father-in-law's legal affairs including drafting his will. Storke saw to it that upon More's death, the majority of his estate would go to Mattie.

== Political career ==
Storke was elected to the California State Assembly in 1882, serving from 1883 to 1885, and elected again in 1888 for the 74th district, serving from 1889 to 1891. He opposed the Southern Pacific Railroad because he was not a part of the so-called political machine. Storke explained:

The railroad refused to pay its taxes. So, during 1884, a special session of legislature was called, for the purpose of devising ways and means to enforce payment. ... Various measures were introduced, including one ... which provided that, ... stocks and bonds of railroad corporations were to be assessed on market value as shown by state stock exchange quotation. This was intended ... as a method of arriving at the real worth of the railroad, so it could be properly assessed. ... The estimate cost ... was more than $20,000.00 in bribes. Then we went home. The people of California were disgusted with us, and seemingly the railroad's grip was as strong as ever.

When Storke discovered that Luther Ingersol was compiling a biographical book about the prominent citizens of Santa Barbara and nearby counties, Storke was pleased to be interviewed by the well-known writer Yda Addis. Storke was attracted to Addis for her quick mind, her good social standing and her fame as a writer. Addis, on the other hand, saw Storke as a man who could offer her financial security. They were married on September 10, 1890. The marriage was not a good match. A divorce followed, and in the subsequent lawsuit Addis accused Storke of "sexual perversion". Storke was acquitted. Later Addis tried to kill her attorney believing him to be working with her husband against her. After an eight-month sentence she was released from prison, found a new lawyer to defend her, and demanded alimony from Storke. Subsequently, Storke had Addis committed to an insane asylum where she later escaped never to be heard from again.

Charles A. Storke later remarried in 1917 to Mary Emeline Gregory Webb. He continued to practice the law and helped his son Thomas to enter the publishing of the Santa Barbara News-Press, then called the Santa Barbara Post.

He died in 1936, at the age of 89.

== See also ==
- History of Santa Barbara, California
- List of mayors of Santa Barbara, California
