= History of the University of California, Santa Barbara =

The University of California, Santa Barbara (UCSB) traces its roots back to the 19th century when it (as well as Santa Barbara City College) emerged from the Santa Barbara School District, which was formed in 1866 and celebrated its 145th anniversary in 2011. UCSB's earliest predecessor was the Anna S. C. Blake Manual Training School, named after Anna S. C. Blake, a sloyd-school which was established in 1891. From there, the school underwent several transformations, most notably its takeover by the University of California system in 1944.

== Early years ==
Anna S. C. Blake founded the Anna S. C. Blake Manual Training School in 1891 and offered home economics and industrial arts courses. Blake, who modeled her curriculum after the sloyd method, would ultimately rely on her neighbor, Ednah Rich, to run the school after sending Rich to study the sloyd method in Boston, Sweden, and Germany. Rich would become principal of the school in 1896. In May 1898, Blake, nearing the end of her life, deeded the school to the city of Santa Barbara, California as part of the Santa Barbara public schooling system. The deed was officially transferred on July 1, 1899, just months after Blake's death.

The Anna Blake School was taken over by the state in 1909 and became the Santa Barbara State Normal School of Manual Art and Home Economics. The campus was on the Riviera in Santa Barbara, portions of which house today's Riviera Theatre. By 1913, the Riviera neighborhood was established, and housing for up to 40 faculty and students was built. (This housing is today's El Encanto Hotel.)

In 1921, it was renamed Santa Barbara State Teachers College. It began to expand its curriculum to become a more liberal arts college and was authorized to grant four-year degrees. Then, in 1935 the college changed its name again and became known as the Santa Barbara State College, offering broader curricula in teaching and the liberal arts.

Growth was so rapid that a new campus was needed. When the 1925 Santa Barbara earthquake destroyed Dibblee's imposing stone mansion, Punta Del Castillo, on the cliff overlooking the harbor, land was available, and, by 1932, it had been purchased for the college. The remains of the mansion were cleared and the stone was used to build the retaining wall on Cliff Drive. The first building was completed in 1941.

== Takeover by the University of California ==
Intense lobbying by an interest group in the City of Santa Barbara, led by Thomas Storke and Pearl Chase, persuaded the state legislature, Governor Earl Warren, and the Regents of the University of California to move the state college over to the more research-oriented University of California system in 1944. The State College system sued to stop the takeover, but the Governor did not support the suit. A state initiative was passed, however, to stop subsequent conversions of state colleges to University of California campuses. From 1944 to 1958 the school was known as Santa Barbara College of the University of California, before taking on its current name.

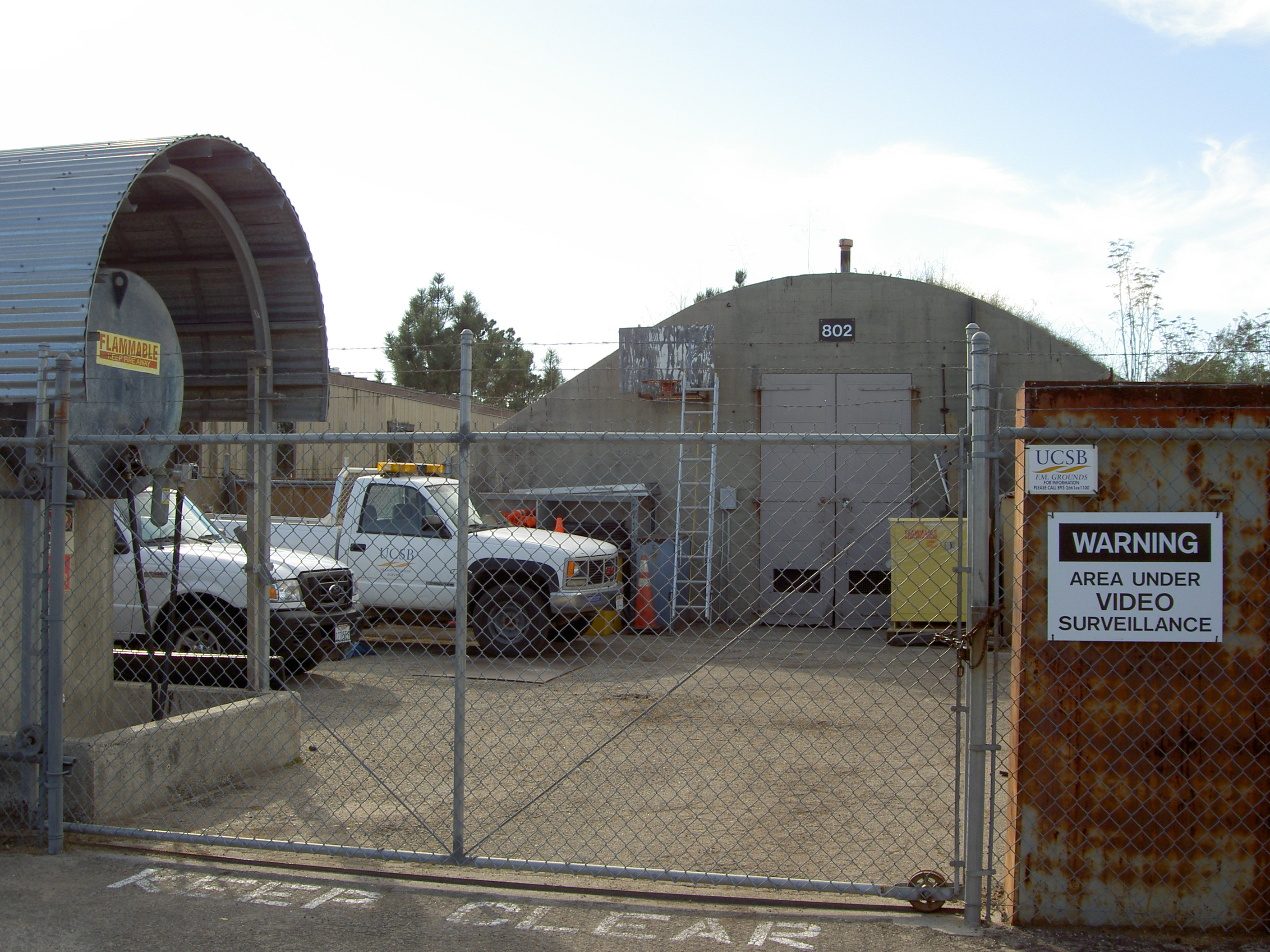
Former MCAS Santa Barbara munitions bunker currently being used as storage by UCSB

Originally, the regents envisioned a small, several thousand-student liberal arts college, a so-called "Williams College of the West", at Santa Barbara. Chronologically, UCSB is the third general-education campus of the University of California, after Berkeley and UCLA (the only other state campus to have been acquired by the UC system). The original campus the regents acquired in Santa Barbara was located on only 100 acres (40 ha) of largely unusable land on a seaside mesa. The availability of a 400-acre (160 ha) portion of the land used as Marine Corps Air Station Santa Barbara until 1946 on another seaside mesa in Goleta, which the regents could acquire for free from the federal government, led to that site becoming the Santa Barbara campus in 1949.

== Unstable campus leadership ==
During UCSB's first 50 years after joining UC, a recurring theme in its history was a pronounced lack of stability in campus leadership. The transfer of the state college to UC had been driven primarily by the Santa Barbara community and was accepted with great reluctance by the Board of Regents. The existing UC faculty looked down upon the state college faculty and recommended to the regents that Santa Barbara could only join UC under harsh conditions: Santa Barbara was to remain a small "regional college" with a separate and lower salary scale for its faculty, who would not be allowed to join the Academic Senate. Clarence L. Phelps, the president of the state college, stayed on as the first provost of the new Santa Barbara campus. Unfortunately, Phelps was badly hampered by the change in management and the regents' desire to keep Santa Barbara small, as well as World War II and its attendant constraints on construction. He retired in 1946.

The regents allowed the new campus to languish for almost a decade under its second provost, J. Harold Williams, who infuriated the faculty at Santa Barbara by refusing to move to the campus he was supposed to be managing. Williams continued to maintain his home in Los Angeles and stayed in an apartment in Santa Barbara on weekdays. In public, Williams was bland and "remote," which caused the news media to claim he "lacked color." However, in private, he got along well with his closest advisers at the Santa Barbara campus, and helped the campus learn how to deal with the UC bureaucracy.

In 1955, Williams was succeeded as provost by Clark G. Kuebler, but Kuebler resigned after only nine months, when he was accused of propositioning a male detective he had just met while visiting New York City to recruit faculty members. He was arrested by the New York City Police Department on suspicion of assault and loitering in a public place to solicit "a crime against nature". Kuebler maintained his innocence and the charges were later dropped, but his academic career was over. In the conservative 1950s, a mere accusation of homosexuality "regardless of ... veracity or outcome" was often fatal to an academic career.

The campus then cycled through two acting provosts. The combination of Phelps's lame-duck wartime management, followed by Williams's indifferent long-distance management from Los Angeles, and then rapid local turnover meant there was no stable leader in residence at Santa Barbara from 1944 to 1959. One positive development during these dark years was that the Academic Senate finally allowed the Santa Barbara faculty to join in 1956.

None of these issues went unnoticed by Storke, the publisher of the local newspaper, who was appointed to the Board of Regents in 1955 and was finally in a position to do something about them. In October 1957, Clark Kerr was selected by the regents as the next UC president, and after that fateful board meeting at Davis, Storke said twice to Kerr for emphasis: "Don't forget Santa Barbara." Kerr replied, "Tom, I can't forget Santa Barbara and I won't. The university needs Santa Barbara now." At that time, Santa Barbara was primarily known for being a "party school" with its "ocean beach and surfing." There was little research output, there were no doctorate programs, the campus library only had 101,000 volumes, and admissions requirements were not as stringent as other UC campuses (an issue belatedly fixed in 1959). On September 19, 1958, the regents voted to accept Kerr's recommendation: "The Santa Barbara campus will become a general campus of the university ... with graduate programs leading to the highest degrees." The campus name was changed to the University of California, Santa Barbara (UCSB).

As of 1958, the campus's strongest and most famous program was its Department of Industrial Arts. The regents saw "shop work" as beneath the dignity of a research university and made sure it was eliminated, despite protests from its counterparts at other colleges and universities as well as California high schools (who considered it an excellent source of industrial arts teachers). The UCSB College of Letters and Science was created in 1961. This was followed in 1962 by the creation of education and engineering schools. According to Kerr, the objective "was to expand as fast as possible" to surround and overwhelm the old state college faculty with new university faculty.

== From state college to research university ==
Samuel B. Gould was appointed as UCSB's first chancellor in 1959, but lasted only until 1962. Although Gould was gregarious and had excellent public relations skills, the faculty was greatly disappointed to not get an academic superstar of the caliber of Nobel laureate Glenn T. Seaborg (then serving as chancellor at Berkeley), and Gould was disappointed when he realized he would not be immediately promoted to lead a more prestigious campus like Berkeley or UCLA.

In 1959, UCSB Professor Douwe Stuurman hosted the English writer Aldous Huxley as the university's first visiting professor. Huxley delivered a lecture series called "The Human Situation".

Vernon Cheadle served as UCSB's second chancellor from 1962 to 1977. He initially provided needed stability and able leadership, and gave Storke and other Santa Barbara boosters what they had desired for so long: the transformation of the state college into a research university.

== Anti-Vietnam Hotbed ==
During the late 1960s and early 1970s, UCSB became nationally known as a hotbed of anti-Vietnam War activity as well as radical activity in general. In 1968, twelve black students occupied North Hall — temporarily renaming it Malcolm X Hall — to force the administration to acknowledge the needs of black students. The university answered the demands of the group by creating the Department of Black Studies. On April 11, 1969, a bombing at the school's faculty club killed the caretaker, Dover Sharp. In 1970, the campus and surrounding community were ravaged by protests and associated violence and arson. On February 25, William Kunstler spoke to an audience of several thousand students in Harder Stadium about his defense of the Chicago Seven at their recent trial (in which the verdicts had just come in a week earlier), and finished by calling upon the students: "Fill the streets so they can see you! Power to the People!" During the ensuing unrest that afternoon and evening, the Bank of America branch building in the student community of Isla Vista was burned down on the third attempt. In response, Governor Ronald Reagan flew to Santa Barbara the next day and declared a state of emergency. He imposed a curfew and ordered the National Guard to enforce it. Weapon-carrying guardsmen were a common sight on campus and in Isla Vista during this tense period. Bank of America refused to leave Isla Vista and established a temporary branch in a trailer, which became the site of further demonstrations. At one of those, on April 17, 1970, a male student, Kevin Moran, was shot and killed by a deputy sheriff.

The burning of Bank of America was a watershed moment in UCSB history that changed the university's public image forever. From 1969 to 1972, enrollment dropped from 13,254 to 11,828, and the political alignment of UCSB's student body rapidly shifted from the right to the left. After Bank of America belatedly departed Isla Vista in 1981, UCSB later bought its former building and renovated it into a state-of-the-art lecture venue now known as Embarcadero Hall.

According to future UC President David P. Gardner (who was working at UCSB at the time), Cheadle had started as a strong and decisive leader, but was severely traumatized by these developments and became much more passive in the later years of his chancellorship. From 1972 to 1977, the campus was administered by Vice Chancellor Alec Alexander. Alexander, an economist, reallocated faculty appointments from departments in decline to up-and-coming departments, which helped lay the foundation for UCSB's long-term success.

With time, other flaws in Cheadle's chancellorship became clear. Incompetent long-range planning both on- and off-campus squandered the magnificent architectural possibilities afforded by the only UC beachfront campus location, which is why today, both the campus and Isla Vista are notorious for a hodgepodge of architectural styles and disorganized layouts. UCSB's "party school" image was magnified by the excessive proportion of undergraduates, which in turn arose from Cheadle's failure to establish graduate schools in law, business, and medicine during the 1960s when it would have been most financially feasible to do so.

== The 1980s and 1990s ==
Chancellors Robert Huttenback (1978–1986) and Barbara Uehling (1987–1994) both lost the confidence of the UCSB faculty and did not leave office at times of their choosing. Huttenback came to UCSB from Caltech and was credited with recruiting high-quality faculty in engineering and physical sciences. One such recruit later recalled that Huttenback insisted on personally picking him up at Los Angeles International Airport, in order to personally deliver the hard sell while driving back to Santa Barbara along the picturesque Pacific Coast Highway. Ironically, Huttenback was a specialist on the history of British imperialism who alienated the faculty, the student body, and much of the community with his imperial arrogance. Huttenback's downfall occurred when he was accused in April 1986 of embezzlement of university funds for remodeling his off-campus residence the year before. UC Presidents Gardner and David S. Saxon both testified at Huttenback's trial that he did not have their authorization to spend university funds on such a personal expense, and as a result, Huttenback and his wife Freda were both convicted by a Santa Maria jury in July 1988. In the meantime, at Gardner's request, UC Irvine's founding chancellor Daniel Aldrich served as UCSB's acting chancellor while a search was conducted for Huttenback's replacement.

Uehling and Rosemary S. J. Schraer (at UC Riverside) were the first women to serve as UC chancellors. Uehling's reputation was damaged when she was arrested for driving under the influence the week before she was to become chancellor (although the criminal charge was later reduced to reckless driving). Unlike Huttenback, she was able to maintain good community relations, but ended up resigning to avoid an impending vote of no confidence by the UCSB Academic Senate.

In contrast to all the drama that preceded him, Chancellor Henry T. Yang (1994- ) was praised a year after his inauguration by the Santa Barbara Independent for his "effort to heal the campus soul." Yang's chancellorship has been remarkably stable in comparison to all his predecessors as chancellor (and before that, provost); by 2015, he had become the longest-serving chancellor of any UC campus.

== Recent history ==
=== Academic Excellence Recognized ===
In 1995, UCSB was elected to the Association of American Universities, the most prestigious alliance of research universities in the United States and Canada. The difficult process of AAU admission had been initiated by Chancellor Uehling and was completed by her successor, Chancellor Yang.

Since 2000, UCSB faculty have won five Nobel Prizes, significantly strengthening the academic profile and image of the university.

=== Abortion protest incident ===
In March 2014, an associate professor of feminist studies, Mireille Miller-Young, was charged with battery, theft, and vandalism after she allegedly stole and destroyed a sign from an anti-abortion demonstrator, who was protesting in an area of the UCSB campus designated as a "free speech zone." The sign depicted graphic imagery of aborted fetuses, and Professor Miller-Young responded by allegedly stealing the sign from one of the demonstrators, a 16-year-old girl who was identified as a member of the group Survivors of the Abortion Holocaust, and when the girl tried to take the sign back, the professor allegedly pushed and scratched her. The university initially stated that it would not publicly comment on personnel matters. However, UCSB's Vice Chancellor of Student Affairs, Michael D. Young, issued a statement supporting free speech on campus, while also accusing outside groups of trying to create divisions in the campus community. Although Miller-Young initially pleaded not guilty, she changed her plea to no contest in July 2014, and was sentenced to three years probation; 108 hours of community service; and 10 hours of anger management classes. In November 2014, the anti-abortion group involved in the incident filed a civil lawsuit against the University of California Santa Barbara and against Mireille Miller-Young. The complaint reportedly was filed to "vindicate [the plaintiff's] own rights and rights of others" with the anti-abortion group claiming that the university failed to discipline Professor Miler-Young, who as of the filing of the civil lawsuit remains employed by UCSB.

=== 2014 Isla Vista killings ===
On May 23, 2014, six students were killed after an attacker, later identified as 22-year-old Elliot Rodger, embarked on a killing spree in Isla Vista, a community located near the UCSB campus. The first three students, 20-year-old Cheng Yuan "James" Hong, 19-year-old George Chen, and 20-year-old Weihan Wang, were all stabbed to death in an apartment they shared with Rodger. The remaining three students were all shot and killed during a series of drive-by shootings; these victims were identified as 22-year-old Katherine Cooper, 19-year-old Veronika Weiss, and 20-year-old Christopher Michael-Martinez. Cooper and Weiss, both members of the Delta Delta Delta sorority, were killed in front of an Alpha Phi sorority house, while Michael-Martinez was killed in front of the Isla Vista Deli Mart.

Three days after the killing spree, UCSB canceled its classes for May 27 and scheduled a memorial service for the victims on that same afternoon. In regards to the killings, the university released a statement, saying, "Our campus community is shocked and saddened by the events that occurred last night in the nearby community of Isla Vista. Our thoughts and prayers are with the victims and their families who are grieving and mourning as a result of this tragedy."

== Campus development ==
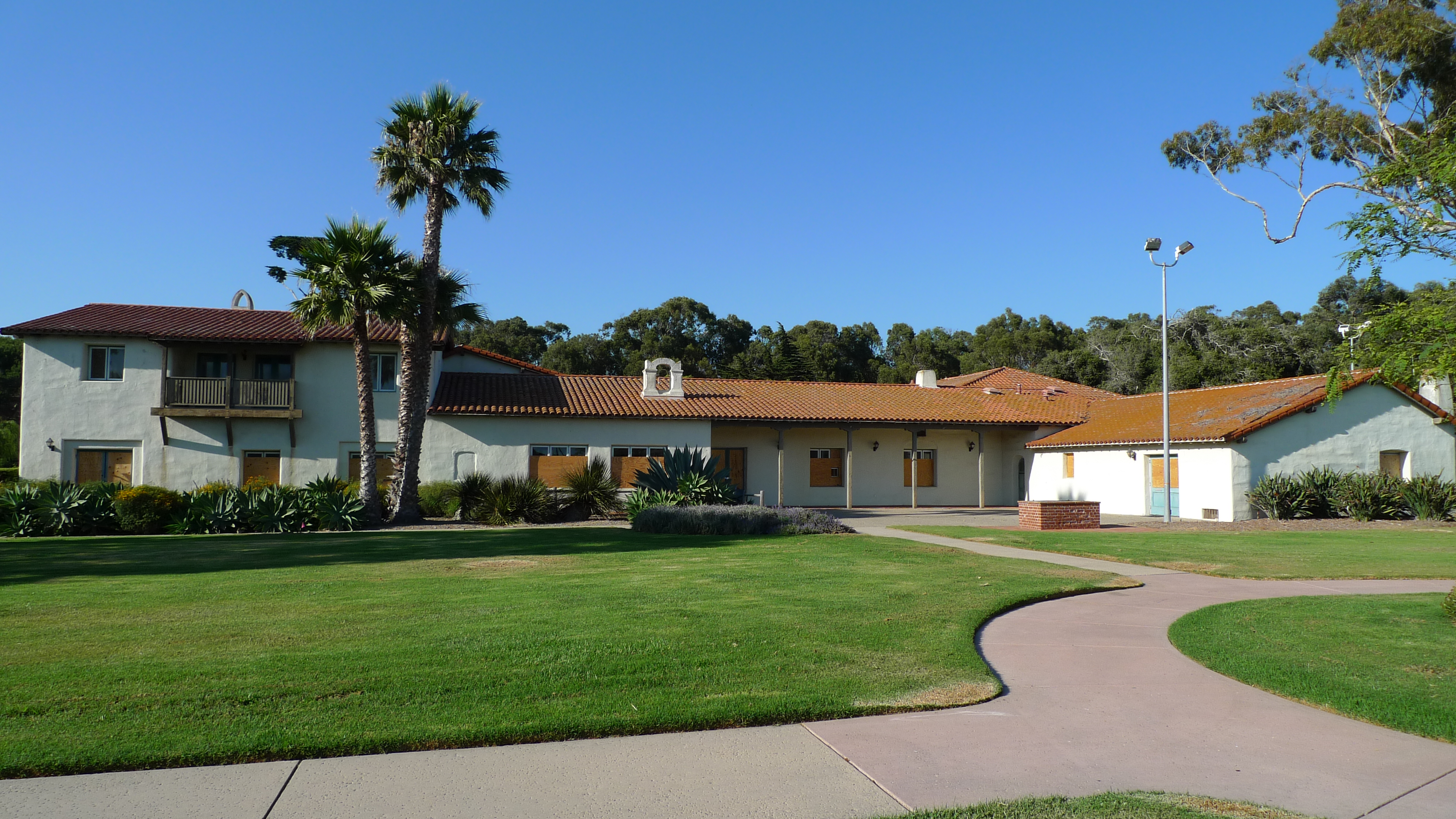
Devereux Hall, formerly the Campbell Mansion, in 2010, after this campus was closed as a Devereux school and sold to University of California, Santa Barbara.

The campus has expanded by purchasing property in the surrounding area, in particular a large portion of a ranch owned by the Powys Campbell family. The university's West Campus includes the Orfalea Family Child Care Center, university stables, and West Campus Point faculty housing. The university purchased 221.5 acres of land owned by the Devereux Foundation in 1967 and the right of first refusal on the remaining 33 acres, which it bought in 2007. Land was placed permanently in nature preserve at Coal Oil Point, along the bluffs by the ocean, and the open field between the bluffs and West Campus Point faculty housing units.

The Campbell ranch was purchased and developed starting in 1919 by Colonel Powys Campbell and his wife Nancy Leiter Campbell, who bought the property when they arrived from England. It had been part of Rancho Dos Pueblos, a Mexican land grant from the 1840s. The 500-acre Campbell Ranch was a significant property in its heyday, one of the largest in Santa Barbara County. The property remained in the family's hands until after World War II, with a large portion bought by Helena T. Devereux in 1945 for $100,000. She built a second facility for mentally disabled individuals, which operated until the early 2000s. The University of California bought the last 33 acres in 2007. Remnants of the Campbell family's ownership are seen in the Celtic cross at Cliff House, which marks the family's former burial site. The now-unused historic redwood barn still stands by the university stables. It was designed by architect Mary Craig.

The university purchased privately owned dormitories at the corner of Storke Road and El Colegio in 2003. The university had attempted to buy the 19-acre property previously. Renamed the Santa Catalina Residence Halls, the property has housed UCSB students. In early 2015, the university has begun an expansion of the residence halls.

Affordable housing for faculty was a priority to recruit and retain faculty. In December 1986, 65 two- and three-bedroom faculty housing units at West Campus Point were completed. For this and subsequent planned unit developments, the university selects qualified buyers who are offered a unit at a price the university determines. The buyer must sell the unit back to the university at a price it sets and it is then offered for sale to another university-determined qualified buyer. The university planned to build more faculty housing at its North Campus. Originally planned in 2004 to be 236 units of faculty and 151 units of family student housing, the California Coastal Commission required modifications to reduce the number of faculty housing to 172 units. A 70-acre parcel of the North Campus land was to be placed in a conservation easement with public access.

In an effort to protect the environment, the university has teamed up with the Trust for Public Land (TPL) to restore the Ocean Meadows Golf Course to wetlands. The property around the Devereux Slough had been partially filled in. Seventy acres of land were added to the over 500 acres already put in nature-protected status. The 70 acres were purchased by the TPL for $7 million in March 2013. The university will manage the property as a steward; the land will be accessible to the public for recreation. Restoration of the land will need further funds, estimated at $10 million, which the TPL has begun raising.

Facilities developed on campus were building projects funded by student fees, including the Student Resource Building, which opened in 2007.

In 2021, plans for a largely windowless dormitory drew criticism from architects.
