= List of chancellors of the University of California, Santa Barbara =

The following is a list of chancellors of the University of California, Santa Barbara, as well as leaders of the university's predecessors.

The earliest predecessor, Santa Barbara State College, was under the supervision of a president. In 1944, when the college became affiliated with the University of California, the title of the chief executive was changed to Provost. In September 1958, the Regents of the University of California established Santa Barbara as a full campus of the University of California, with the official title of the campus chief executive being changed to Chancellor.

== List ==
No.	Image	Name	From	To	Length	Ref.
President, Santa Barbara State Normal School / Santa Barbara State College
1	–	Clarence L. Phelps	1918	1944	26 years	
Provost, Santa Barbara College of the University of California
1	–	Clarence L. Phelps	1944	1946	2 years	
2	–	J. Harold Williams	1946	1955	9 years	
3	–	Clark G. Kuebler	1955	December 16, 1955 (Note: Resigns shortly after arrest in New York City on unsubstantiated morals charges in which he was exonerated.)	<1 year	
acting	–	John C. Snidecor	February 1956 (Note: There might be newspaper evidence that Snidecor might have "unofficially" served as acting provost while Kuebler was away trying to exonerate himself in New York and possible after Kuebler's resignation but before Snidecor was formally named acting provost.)	June 30, 1956	<1 year	
acting	–	Elmer Noble	July 1, 1956	September 1958	2 years	
Chancellor, University of California, Santa Barbara
acting	–	Elmer Noble	September 1958	June 30, 1959	1 year	
1	–	Samuel B. Gould	July 1, 1959	June 30, 1962 (Note: Resigned to oversee New York educational television.)	3 years	
2	–	Vernon Cheadle	July 1, 1962	June 30, 1977	15 years	
3	–	Robert Huttenback	July 1, 1977	December 31, 1986 (Note: Huttenback resigned on July 11, 1986, and then he was granted a leave of absence from September 1, 1986, to July 31, 1987. Huttenback's resignation followed several months of controversy. The chancellor had inappropriately charged $174,087 of improvement and maintenance costs for his home to University accounts. He had chosen not to live in the chancellor's residence on campus. Huttenback has agreed to pay back the whole amount. In July 1988, Huttenback and his wife were convicted by a Santa Maria jury.)	9 years	
acting		Daniel G. Aldrich	September 1, 1986 (Note: Huttenback resigned on July 11, 1986, and then he was granted a leave of absence from September 1, 1986, to July 31, 1987. Daniel Aldrich was appointed as the acting chancellor of UC Santa Barbara until a permanent replacement was found.)	June 30, 1987	1 year	
4	–	Barbara Uehling	July 1, 1987	June 30, 1994 (Note: Originally scheduled to leave the chancellor's office before June 23, 1994, Barbara Uehling did not leave the office until July 1, as they were negotiating for the high-priced final extended leave package with the University of California system.)	7 years	
5		Henry T. Yang	June 23, 1994 (Note: In March 1994, Yang was scheduled to assume office on June 23, 1994. However, in April, Uehling renegotiated her leaving package and extended her nominal tenure until June 30.)	July 14, 2025	>31 years	
interim	–	David Marshall	July 15, 2025	August 31, 2025	1.5 months	
6		Dennis Assanis	September 1, 2025	incumbent		

== See also ==
- List of presidents of the University of California
- List of chancellors of the University of California, Berkeley
- List of chancellors of the University of California, Davis
- List of chancellors of the University of California, Irvine
- List of chancellors of the University of California, Los Angeles
- List of chancellors of the University of California, Merced
- List of chancellors of the University of California, Riverside
- List of chancellors of the University of California, San Diego
- List of chancellors of the University of California, San Francisco
- List of chancellors of the University of California, Santa Cruz
