= Kubler =

Kubler or Kübler may refer to:

== People with the surname Kubler ==
- Françoise Kubler (born 1958), French operatic soprano
- George Kubler (1912–1996), American art historian
- Ida Ivanka Kubler (born 1978), visual artist
- Jason Kubler (born 1993), Australian tennis player
- Tad Kubler, American guitarist

== People with the surname Kübler ==
- Andreas Kübler (born 1963), West German-German slalom canoeist
- Elisabeth Kübler-Ross (1926–2004), Swiss-born psychiatrist and the author of the groundbreaking book On Death and Dying
- Felix Kübler (born 1969), German economist
- Ferdinand Kübler (1919–2016), retired Swiss cyclist
- Jannis Kübler (born 1999), German footballer
- Jürgen Kübler, West German slalom canoeist
- Klaus Kübler (born 1959), German triple jumper
- Ludwig Kübler (1889–1947), German General of the Mountain Troops during World War II
- Lukas Kübler (born 1992), German footballer
- Maria Susanna Kübler (1814–1873), Swiss writer
- Stella Kübler (1922–1994), Jewish woman who collaborated with the Nazis
- Ursula Kübler (1928–2010), Swiss ballerina and actress

== Other uses ==
- Kübler Absinthe, a Swiss anise-flavored spirit
- Kübler-Ross model, the five stages of grief

== See also ==
- Kuebler
- Kuffner (surname)
