= Kuebler =

Kuebler is a surname. Notable people with the surname include:

- Clark G. Kuebler (1908–1974), American professor and educator
- William C. Kuebler (1971–2015), American lawyer

== See also ==
- Keble
- Kübler
