= Keble =

Keble is both a surname and a given name. Notable people with the name include:

- Bernard Keble Sandwell (1876–1940), Canadian newspaper editor
- Edward Keble Chatterton (1878–1944), English writer
- Henry Keble (?–1517), Lord Mayor of London
- John Keble (1792–1866), English churchman and founder of the Oxford Movement
- Joseph Keble (1632–1710), English barrister
- Keble Howard, pen name of John Keble Bell, (1875–1928), English writer and journalist
- Keble Munn (1920–2008), Jamaican politician
- Richard Keble (fl. 1650), judge, and a supporter of the Parliamentarian cause during the English Civil War
- Thomas Keble (1793–1875), English clergyman
- William Keble Martin (1877–1969), British botanist

== See also ==
- Keble College, Oxford, one of the constituent colleges of the University of Oxford
- Keble Hills, hill range in Antarctica
- Keble Road, a street in Oxford
- Keble School, a preparatory school
