= John W. Schwada =

American educator (1919–1990)

13th President of Arizona State University
- In office 1971–1981
- Preceded by: Harry K. Newburn
- Succeeded by: J. Russell Nelson

Personal details
- Born: September 23, 1919 Oklahoma, U.S.
- Died: April 19, 1990 (aged 70) Phoenix, Arizona, U.S.
- Education: Northeast Missouri State Teachers College; University of Missouri; University of Texas at Austin
- Profession: University President

John W. Schwada (September 23, 1919 – April 19, 1990) was an American educator. He served as the chancellor of the University of Missouri in the 1960s and as the president of Arizona State University in the 1970s.

== Life ==
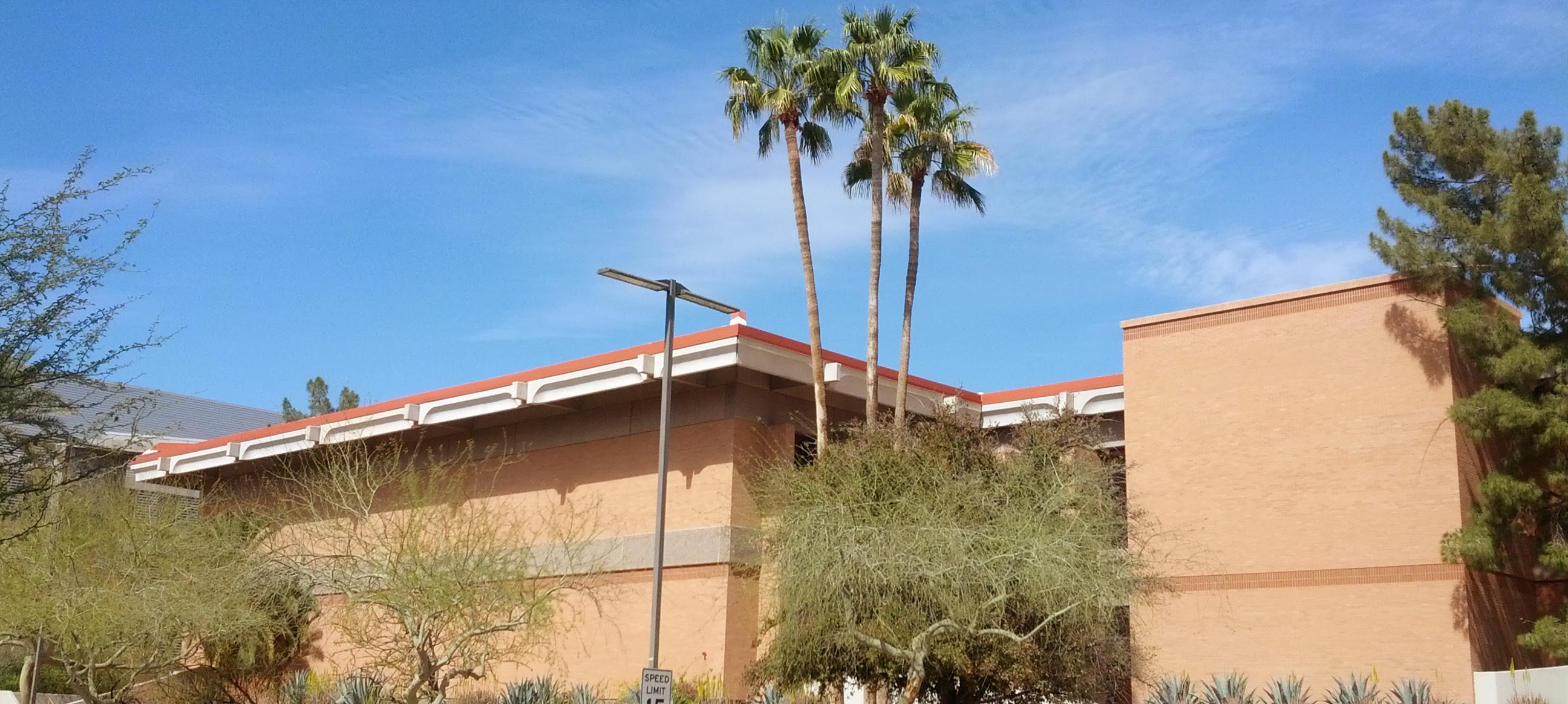
The Classroom Office Building, constructed in 1979, was renamed for Schwada in February 1995

Schwada was born on September 23, 1919, in Oklahoma. His family moved to north of Clarence, Missouri, where he graduated from high school in 1937. In 1941 he graduated from Northeast Missouri State Teachers College with a bachelor's degree. During World War II, Schwada served in the Army Air Forces and rose to the rank of captain. After the war, he continued his studies, earning a master's degree in political science from the University of Missouri in Columbia in 1947 and a doctorate in 1951 from the University of Texas at Austin.

In the early 1950s, Schwada became an associate political science professor at Missouri. During this time, he received a grant from the Ford Foundation to study the development of teaching material in the field of international relations. In June 1957, he became a consultant to the state of Missouri's Division of Budget and Comptroller and helped it revise its budget policies; the next year, he was appointed by Governor James T. Blair, Jr. as state comptroller and director of Missouri's budget. He resigned from the position in 1961 to return to the faculty of the university.

In 1964, Schwada returned to Columbia to serve as the chancellor of the University of Missouri. He was the 15th chief executive of the Columbia campus and the first to bear the title chancellor after the creation of the four-school University of Missouri System. In Schwada's final year at Missouri, on May 8, 1970, a student revolt prompted by the murder of four students at Kent State University stormed his office and briefly took over campus.

In December 1970, Schwada announced his resignation from the University of Missouri, in order to become the thirteenth president of Arizona State University beginning in July 1971. His inauguration, in March 1972, was marked by yet more student protests when MEChA led 80 students in a demonstration against what they believed to be discriminatory university policies. During his decade-long administration, university enrollment jumped from 26,000 to 40,000. Schwada supervised the construction of new athletic venues including the University Activity Center and Packard Stadium, and during his tenure ASU joined the Pacific-10 Conference. Academically, new buildings for life sciences, physical sciences and communication arts were also erected, and the College of Public Programs was established. During Schwada's decade as president, ASU awarded more degrees than it had in its entire previous history. In 1981, Schwada retired and was succeeded by J. Russell Nelson.

Schwada died on April 19, 1990, in Phoenix, after a brief illness. He had two children with his wife Wilma, a daughter and a son. In 1995, a building on campus, the Classroom Office Building which houses lecture halls and some offices, was renamed in his honor.

== See also ==
- History of the University of Missouri
- History of Arizona State University

Academic offices
Preceded by Elmer Ellis	Chancellor of the University of Missouri; 1964-1970	Succeeded by Herbert W. Schooling
Preceded by Harry K. Newburn	President of Arizona State University; 1971-1981	Succeeded by J. Russell Nelson
