= Herbert W. Schooling =

Dr. Herbert W. Schooling (November 5, 1912 – April 1987) was an American educator and former chancellor of the University of Missouri in Columbia, Missouri. He is the 16th chief executive officer of the Columbia campus and second since the creation of the University of Missouri System. Before becoming chancellor Schooling served as dean of faculties and Dean of the college of education. During his tenure the Hearnes Center was constructed.

== See also ==
- History of the University of Missouri

Academic offices
Preceded by John W. Schwada	Chancellor of the University of Missouri; 1971-1978	Succeeded by Barbara Uehling
