= Lattie F. Coor =

American academic and university administrator (1936–2026)

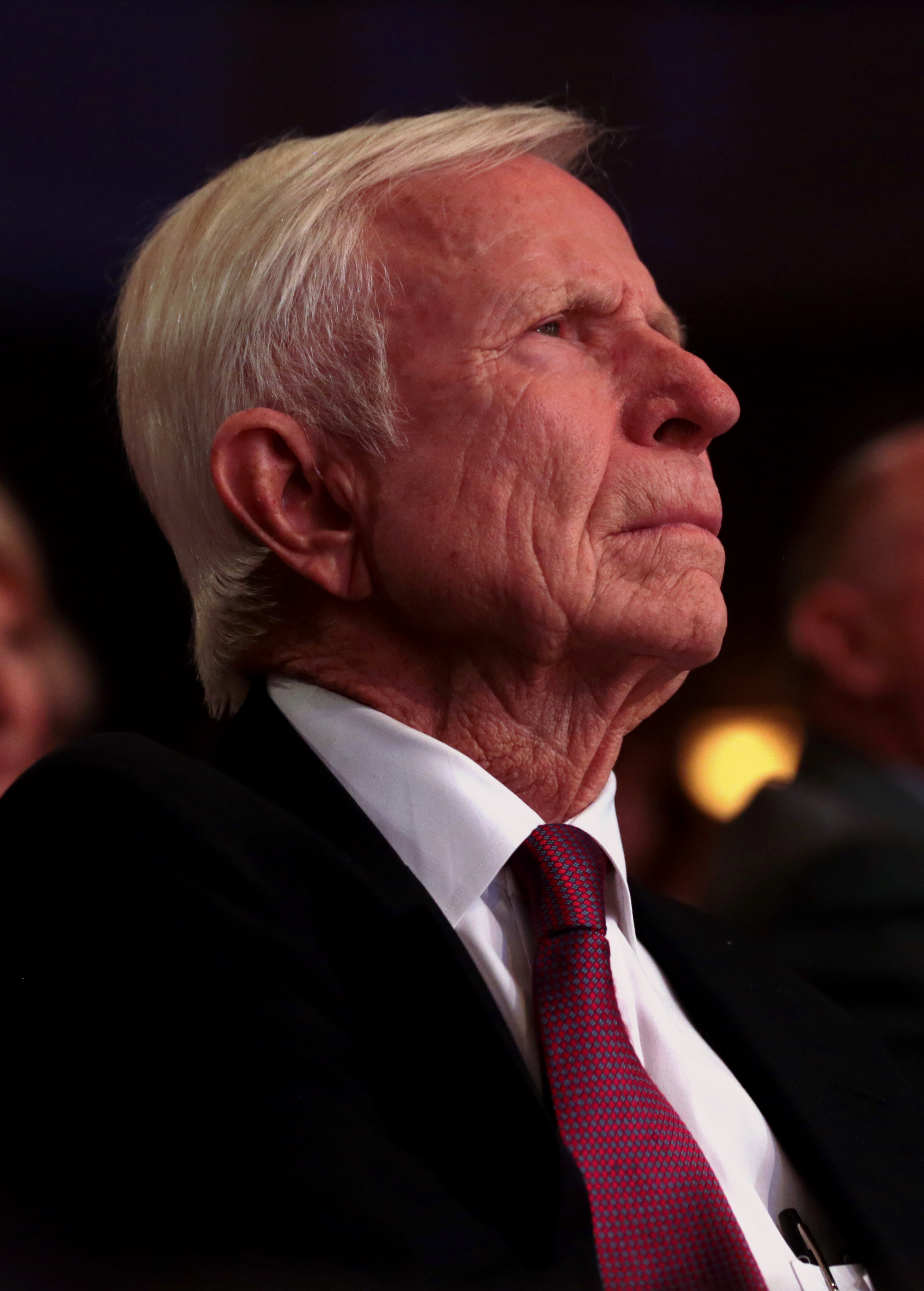

15th President of Arizona State University
- In office 1990–2002
- Preceded by: J. Russell Nelson
- Succeeded by: Michael M. Crow

21st President of the University of Vermont
- In office 1976–1989
- Preceded by: Edward C. Andrews
- Succeeded by: George H. Davis

Personal details
- Born: September 26, 1936 Phoenix, Arizona, U.S.
- Died: July 16, 2026 (aged 89)
- Spouse: Elva Wingfield Coor
- Education: Northern Arizona University (BA); Washington University in St. Louis (MA, PhD)
- Profession: Professor of Public Policy
- Website: Center for the Future of Arizona

Lattie Finch Coor Jr. (September 26, 1936 – July 16, 2026) was an American academic specializing in public policy and the president of two universities. He was the 21st president of the University of Vermont (1976–1989) and 15th president of Arizona State University (1990–2002).

== Early life and career ==
Lattie Finch Coor Jr. was born in Phoenix, Arizona, on September 26, 1936, the son of Lattie Finch Coor Sr. and Elnora (née Witten) Coor. His father was a prominent local educator who was the teaching Principal of Avondale Elementary School in 1936 and later became the first Superintendent of the Avondale Elementary School District.

Coor graduated from Northern Arizona University in 1958 with a BA in political science. He received his MA and PhD from Washington University in St. Louis, where his 1964 doctoral dissertation was titled The Increasing Vulnerability of the American Governor. He remained at Washington University for the next ten years as a faculty member and eventually as its vice chancellor. He left in 1976 when he became the 21st president of the University of Vermont. He served in that capacity until 1989 and then moved to Arizona State University, where he became its 15th president. He was an active member of the NCAA Presidents Commission during the battle for control of college sports.

After his retirement from the presidency of ASU in 2002, he stayed on as professor and Ernest W. McFarland Chair in Leadership and Public Policy in the university's School of Public Affairs. In 2002 he also co-founded a "do tank", the Center for the Future of Arizona, and served as chairman and founding director.

== Personal life and death ==
Coor married Dr. Ina Alexis Fitzhenry (deceased) in 1964. He had three children from his first marriage to Ina Fitzhenry-Coor. In 1994, he was re-married to Elva Wingfield. Coor has three grandchildren.

Coor died on July 16, 2026, at the age of 89.

== Legacy ==
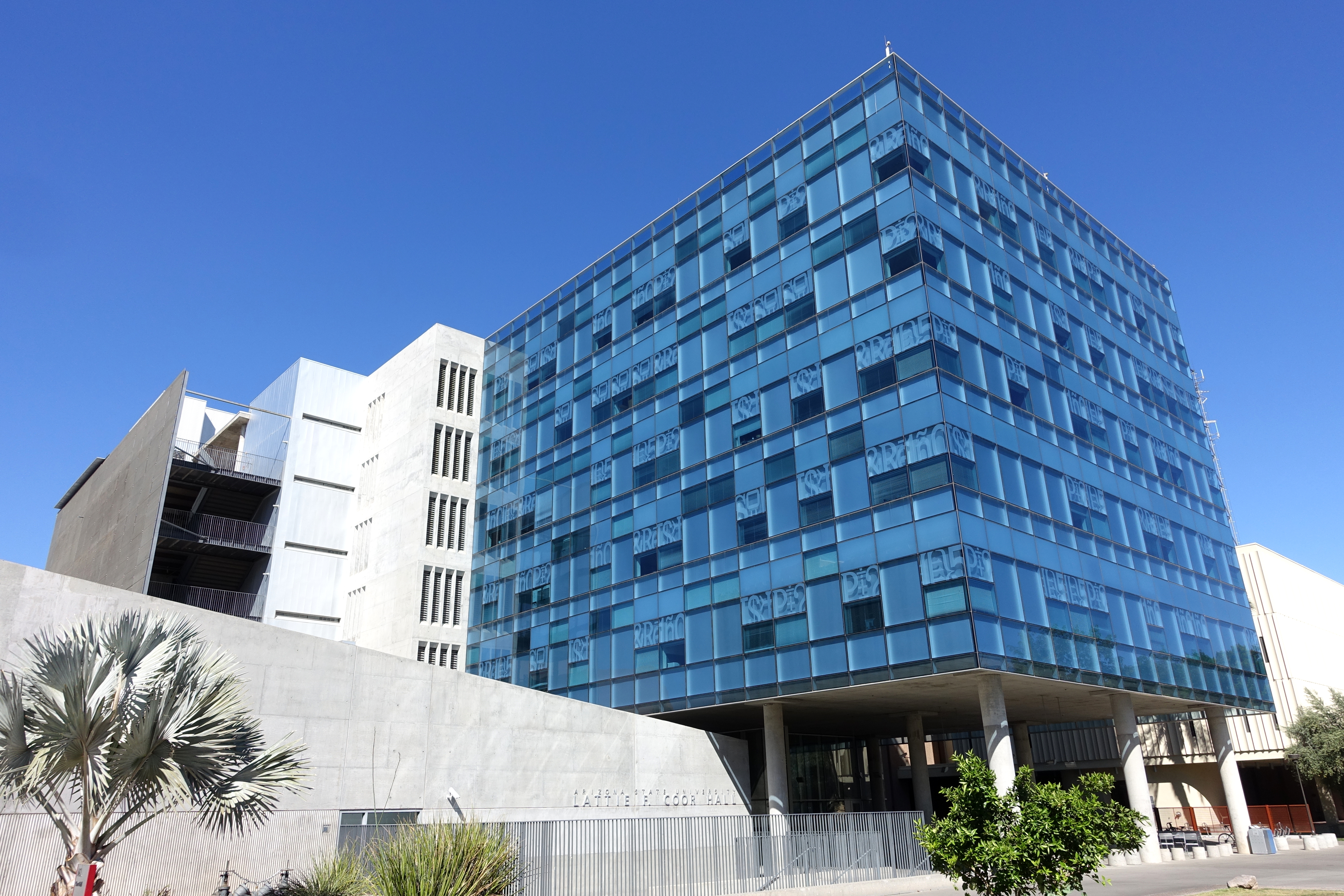
Lattie F. Coor Hall at ASU

The six-story Lattie F. Coor Hall, located in the northwestern portion of Arizona State University, was dedicated January 7, 2004. It is one of the largest campus buildings and houses a variety of programs and classrooms. The Lattie F. Coor House at the University of Vermont was dedicated May 16, 2013, and houses the university's College of Arts and Sciences administrative offices.
