= Johannes Scherr =

German writer (1817–1886)

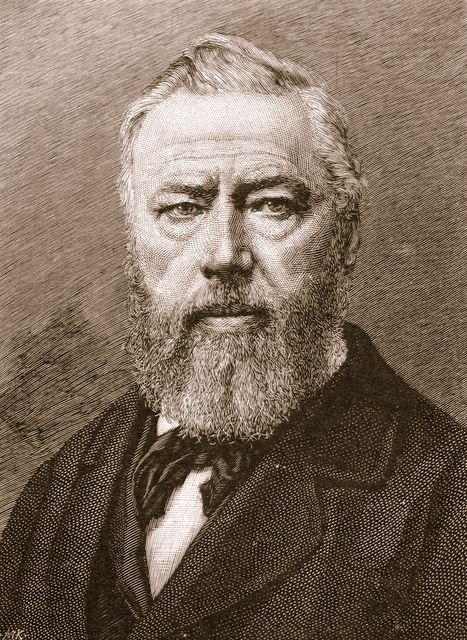
Johannes Scherr

Johannes Scherr (3 October 1817 – 21 November 1886) was a German-born cultural historian, writer, literary critic, educator and politician who spent most of his working life in Switzerland.

== Biography ==
Scherr was born in Hohenrechberg (today part of Schwäbisch Gmünd), Württemberg in October 1817. After studying philosophy and history at the University of Tübingen (1837–1840), he became master in a school conducted by his brother Thomas in Winterthur. In 1843 he moved to Stuttgart, and, entering the political arena with a pamphlet Württemberg im Jahr 1843, was elected in 1848 a member of the Württemberg House of Deputies; became leader of the democratic party in south Germany and, in consequence of his agitation for parliamentary reform in 1849, was obliged, to take refuge in Switzerland to avoid arrest. Condemned in contumaciam to fifteen years hard labor, he established himself in Zürich as Privatdozent in 1850, but moved in 1852 to Winterthur. In 1860 he was appointed professor of history and Swiss literature at the Polytechnicum in Zürich, in which city he died on 21 November 1886.

== Personal life ==
In 1845, Scherr married the Swiss writer Maria Susanna Kübler who is remembered for her early cookbooks and household guides.

== Works ==
Scherr was a voluminous writer in the field of historical investigation into the civilization, literature, and manners and customs of his country. His works, characterized by their caustic wit and many peculiarities in point of diction, have largely a political bias, but are characterized by clearness of exposition and careful research. Noteworthy among his books are the following:

- Deutsche Kultur-und Sitten-Geschichte ("History of German culture and customs," 1852–1853, new ed. 1897)
- Schiller und seine Zeit ("Shiller and his times," 1859, new ed. 1876)
- Geschichte der deutschen Frauenwelt ("History of German women," 1860, 4th edition 1879)
- Allgemeine Geschichte der Literatur ("A history of literature," 1851, 9th edition 1895–1896)
- Geschichte der englischen Literatur ("History of English literature," 1854, 2nd edition 1883)
- Blücher, seine Zeit und sein Leben ("Life and times of Blücher," 1862, 4th edition 1887)
- Germania. Zwei Jahrtausende deutschen Lebens ("Germania. Two millennia of German life," 1879, 6th edition by Hans Prutz 1905)

Scherr also wrote the humorous Sommertagebuch des weiland Dr Gastrosophiae, Jeremia Sauerampfer (1873); as a novelist he published the historical novels, Schiller (1856), and Michel, Geschichte eines Deutschen unserer Zeit (1858) which have passed through several editions.

With the exception of some of his stories (Novellenbuch, 10 volumes, 1873–1877) Scherr's works have not appeared in a collected edition.
