= Ernest L. Boyer =

American educator (1928–1995)

Ernest Boyer

United States Commissioner of Education
- In office March 31, 1977 – June 30, 1979
- President: Jimmy Carter
- Preceded by: Edward Aguirre
- Succeeded by: William Smith

Personal details
- Born: Ernest LeRoy Boyer; September 13, 1928 Dayton, Ohio, U.S.
- Died: December 8, 1995 (aged 67) Princeton, New Jersey, U.S.
- Education: Messiah College; Greenville College (BA); Ohio State University; University of Southern California (MA, PhD)

Ernest LeRoy Boyer (September 13, 1928 – December 8, 1995) was an American educator who most notably served as Chancellor of the State University of New York, United States Commissioner of Education, and President of the Carnegie Foundation for the Advancement of Teaching. Boyer was recipient of numerous awards, including over 140 honorary doctorates.

== Early life and education ==
Boyer was born on September 13, 1928, in Dayton, Ohio, to Clarence and Ethel Boyer. He was one of three males in his family. His father worked in the basement of their home managing a wholesale book store and running a mail-order greeting-card and office-supply. William Boyer, Ernest's paternal grandfather, was said to be the most influential figure in his younger years. William Boyer was head of the Dayton Mission of the Brethren in Christ Church and directed Ernest toward "a people-centered life". He taught Ernest, primarily through his own life, that service to others was a high calling and obligation. Boyer believed deeply in the connectedness of all things. That was a primary reason why he would later propose the connection of teaching, service, and research in Scholarship Reconsidered. He worried that research had trumped the roles of teaching and service in the university and that faculty roles were lesser for it.

Boyer attended Messiah College where he met his future wife and the mother of his four children, Kathryn Garis Tyson; in subsequent years, he would return to Messiah to serve as chairman and as a member of its board of trustees. After two years at Messiah College he transferred to and graduated from Greenville College. He began graduate studies at the Ohio State University, but left for the University of Southern California, where he earned his master's and doctoral degrees in speech pathology and audiology. He was a post-doctoral member in medical audiology at the University of Iowa Hospital.

== Career ==
He began his teaching career at Loyola Marymount University in California while a graduate student, and then served as a professor of speech pathology and audiology at Upland College. At Upland College, he introduced the idea of a program that would give students a period in which they would not attend class during the mid-year term, and the students would take on individual projects. When he was at Upland, he decided that he wanted to devote his career to educational administration.

In 1960 Boyer accepted a position with the Western College Association, as director of the Commission to Improve the Education of Teachers. Two years later he became the director of the Center for Coordinated Education at the University of California, Santa Barbara. In this position Boyer was free to administer projects for the improvement of the California education system, from kindergarten to college.

In 1965, he moved east to join the State University of New York system as its first executive dean. He became Chancellor of the institution five years later.

In his seven-year term, he founded the Empire State College at Saratoga Springs and four other locations as non-campus SUNY schools in which adults could study for degrees without attending classes. He also set up an experimental three-year Bachelor of Arts program; established a new rank, Distinguished Teaching Professor, to reward faculty members of educational distinction as well as research, and established one of the first student-exchange programs with the Soviet Union.

Dr. Boyer served on commissions to advise President Richard M. Nixon and President Gerald R. Ford. In 1977, he was appointed by President Jimmy Carter to lead the United States as Commissioner of Education.

Toward the end of the Carter Administration, Dr. Boyer followed Alan Pifer as president of the Carnegie Foundation for the Advancement of Teaching. He expanded his position to go beyond the study of higher education bringing more attention to education at every level with concentration on the earliest years of a child's education. In the power struggle for control of college sports Dr. Boyer advised the NCAA Presidents Commission, "There are presidents whose institutions are so deeply involved in athletics that their own institutional and personal futures hang in the balance. They feel they must resist such change because athletics are bigger than they are." He served the Foundation from 1979 to his death in 1995. Dr. Boyer died on December 8, 1995. During his three-year struggle with cancer, he never stopped working. He took telephone calls the day before he died.

== Reports ==
One of Boyer's major accomplishments was creating a dialogue between teachers and administrators about teaching methods and programs. He wrote many reports that changed the face of education during his time at the Carnegie Foundation. Boyer addressed issues of secondary and primary education and created discussions about issues in education reform.

After working on a fifteen-month study of the nation's high schools, Boyer wrote High School: A Report on Secondary Education in America (1983). Boyer recommended adopting a "core curriculum" for all students and tougher foreign language and English requirements. He stressed the need for community service before graduation and excellence for all students and teachers.

Boyer's next report stated how many faculty members of undergraduate institutions put more emphasis on research than on actual teaching. His report College: The Undergraduate Experience in America, was published in 1987. Boyer declared that the students were not getting the full attention of their instructors, stressing the importance of directing more resources into undergraduate education programs, expanding orientation and faculty mentoring for new students, and creating community service programs for students. Boyer connects teachers with students and professors in both high school and college on a more personal basis. Community service programs with high schools and college benefit all who are involved.

Scholarship Reconsidered: Priorities of the Professoriate challenged the then current views of faculty priorities and the true meaning of scholarship. Boyer classified four kinds of scholarship: discovery, integration, application, and teaching. This report has created debates around the country and has influenced many colleges and universities to evaluate their faculty differently.

In Ready to Learn: A Mandate for the Nation (1991), Boyer makes a strong point about the importance of preparing young children for school. Education of the parents of preschoolers was essential so that they might know "all of the forces that have such a profound impact on the children's lives and shape their readiness to learn." This study led to landmark legislation such as the Ready to Learn Act of 1994.

In 1995 the Carnegie Foundation published, The Basic School: A Community for Learning. This report talked about the importance of the first years of formal learning. The main point of the report was to help the public understand that the school is a community with a vision, "teachers as leaders and parents as partners." He also wanted a "powerful voice for the arts in education". This report led to the Basic School Network. The trial program was made up of sixteen schools, public and private. Boyer worked with school administrators and staff on the beliefs of the Basic School. This included new ways to create a curriculum, the importance of language and the arts, and the involvement of parents. The Basic School Network now has centers and affiliates around the country and is successful in improving elementary education.

== Awards ==
Awards and recognitions of Ernest Boyer include:

- Charles Frankel Prize in the Humanities, 1994 (Presidential Award)
- James B. Conant Education Award, 1994
- President's Medal, Tel Aviv University
- Distinguished Service Medal, Teachers College, Columbia University
- Horatio Alger Award
- Educator of the Year, 1990, U.S. News & World Report
- Medalist, New York Academy of Public Education
- Friend of Education Award, National Education Association
- 1995 Education Leadership Award, Council for Advancement of Private Education
- Britannica Achievement in Life Award
- The Harold W. McGraw, Jr., Prize in Education
- Honorary Doctor of Humane Letters (L.H.D.) degree from Whittier College.
- Golden Plate Award of the American Academy of Achievement, 1984

== Works ==
- The Basic School: A Community for Learning. The Carnegie Foundation for the Advancement of Teaching, 1995
- College: The Undergraduate Experience in America. New York: Harper & Row, 1987.
- High School: A Report on Secondary Education in America. New York: Harper & Row, 1983.
- Ready to Learn: A Mandate for the Nation. The Carnegie Foundation for the Advancement of Teaching, 1991.
- Scholarship Reconsidered: Priorities of the Professoriate. The Carnegie Foundation for the Advancement of Teaching, 1990.
- Boyer, Ernest L., Philip G. Altbach, and Mary Jean Whitelaw. The Academic Profession: An International Perspective. The Carnegie Foundation for the Advancement of Teaching, 1994. ISBN 978-0-931050-47-3.
- Boyer, Ernest L. and Fred M. Hechinger. Higher Learning in the Nation's Service. The Carnegie Foundation for the Advancement of Teaching, 1981.
- Boyer, Ernest L. and Arthur Levine. A Quest for Common Learning: The Aims of General Education. A Carnegie Foundation Essay. Washington, D.C.: The Carnegie Foundation for the Advancement of Teaching, 1981.
- Boyer, Ernest L. and Lee D. Mitgang. Building Community: A New Future for Architecture Education and Practice. The Carnegie Foundation for the Advancement of Teaching, 1996.

Academic offices
Preceded by Samuel Gould	Chancellor of the State University of New York; 1970–1977	Succeeded by Clifton Wharton
Political offices
Preceded by Edward Aguirre	United States Commissioner of Education; 1977–1979	Succeeded by William Smith
