= Harry K. Newburn =

American educator and university president (1906–1974)

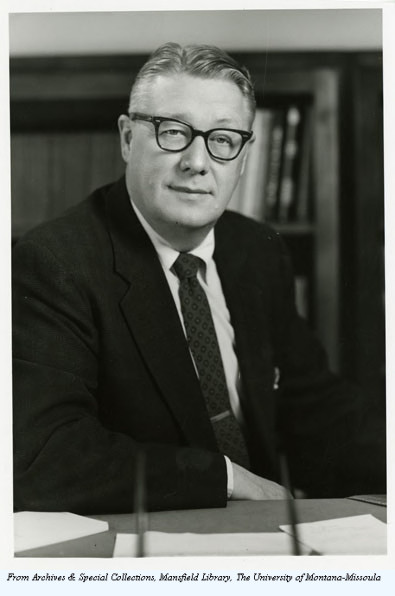
- Newburn during his tenure as president of the University of Montana

12th President of Arizona State University
- In office 1969–1971
- Preceded by: G. Homer Durham
- Succeeded by: John W. Schwada

President of the University of Montana

President of the University of Oregon

Personal details
- Born: January 1, 1906 Cuba, Illinois, U.S.
- Died: August 25, 1974 (aged 68) Phoenix, Arizona, U.S.
- Education: Western Illinois University; University of Iowa; University of Texas at Austin
- Profession: University President

Harry Kenneth Newburn (January 1, 1906 – August 25, 1974) was an American educator. He served as the president of various universities during the mid-20th century.

== Life ==
Newburn was born on January 1, 1906, in the town of Cuba, Illinois. He attended Western Illinois State Teachers College, earning his bachelor's degree in education there and later earning his master's and Ph.D from the University of Iowa. After earning his Ph.D, he remained at Iowa as an assistant professor, rising to the position of dean of its College of Liberal Arts.

In 1945, he became President of the University of Oregon. At Oregon, Newburn confronted a growing university on an understaffed and underbuilt campus. To attract new faculty to replace the many retiring longtime members, Newburn convinced the state legislature to allow salary increases and thus be more competitive in seeking highly qualified professors. To address the inadequate physical plant, temporary buildings were erected, including quonset huts used as classrooms, and other, more permanent structures, such as Emerald Hall, Erb Memorial Union, Carson Hall and Allen Hall. Under Newburn, the university also increased its library holdings and its production of graduate degrees.

Newbury resigned from Oregon in 1953 to serve as the first president of the Educational Television and Radio Center, a project of the Ford Foundation, and served as a consultant to the foundation in 1958. In 1959, he arrived at the University of Montana. During his four-year tenure in Missoula, Newburn orchestrated several projects, including a reorganization of staff, the demolition of older buildings, and increasing pay for faculty and allotments for research. In 1963, he left Montana when he was asked to reorganize Arizona State University's Center for the Study of Higher Education.

While remaining on ASU's faculty, Newbury served as the interim president of Cleveland State University from 1965–66, a position he would return to in 1972–73. He was named dean of ASU's college of education in 1968 and was brought on as acting president in 1969 after the resignation of G. Homer Durham as president. He became the permanent president of ASU in 1970, a year in which he bucked with university administration and the Arizona Board of Regents by refusing to support the termination of Morris Starsky. Nearing the end of his academic career, Newburn did not desire to take on another presidency position, but he agreed to serve as ASU's president until a more permanent replacement was named. In 1971, John W. Schwada became ASU's 13th president, and Newburn conducted an eight-month-long study of the structure of British universities for the Carnegie Corporation of New York.

After his second yearlong tenure as interim president of Cleveland State University, Newburn returned to the Phoenix area, where he died of a heart attack on August 25, 1974.
