= Jenijoy La Belle =

American professor of English (1943–2025)

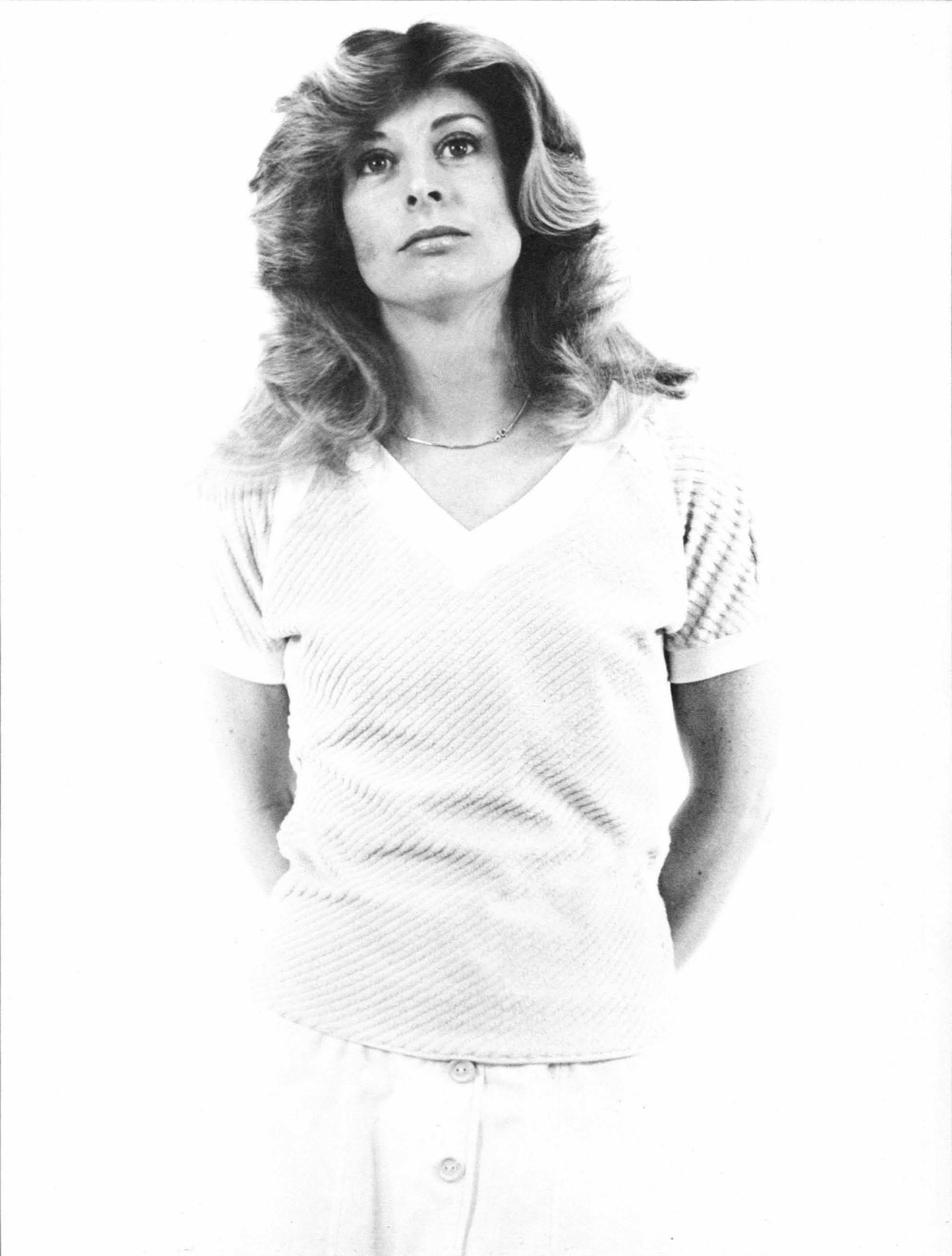
- Jenijoy La Belle in 1978
- Born: November 5, 1943; Olympia, Washington
- Died: January 28, 2025 (aged 81)
- Occupation: Professor of English
- Partner: Robert N. Essick

Academic background
- Education: University of Washington, University of California, San Diego

Jenijoy La Belle (November 5, 1943 – January 28, 2025) was a professor of English at the California Institute of Technology (Caltech). Her scholarship included published work on William Blake, William Shakespeare, and Theodore Roethke among others. She is also noted for work on "women's identity and physical appearance in 19th- and 20th-century literature". When appointed as an assistant professor in 1969, she was the first woman hired to join the tenure-track faculty at Caltech. She received tenure in 1979 after a contentious legal process, and retired as a full professor in 2007.

== Early life ==
La Belle was born to Carlye (née Vieth) and Joseph Joy La Belle, a meter reader for Puget Sound Power and Light and raised in Olympia, Washington. La Belle attended Olympia High School. La Belle attended the University of Washington in Seattle. She met Theodore Roethke there, and later wrote a doctoral thesis about his poetry. She received a Bachelor of Arts in English in 1965, and then commenced doctoral work at the University of California, San Diego as a Woodrow Wilson Fellow. In 1969, she was awarded a Ph.D. in English for a dissertation on the poetry of Theodore Roethke. In 1969, she was hired as a tenure-track assistant professor at Caltech.

== Caltech tenure case ==
In 1969, La Belle began teaching at Caltech. Caltech had not yet admitted women undergraduates, and she was the first woman appointed as a tenure-track professor at Caltech. Olga Taussky-Todd had been tenured as a professor in 1963, but had initially been hired as a research associate. In 1974, the English department recommended La Belle for tenure unanimously. Princeton University Press had recently contracted to publish her book The Echoing Wood of Theodore Roethke. The department's recommendation was rejected by the Humanities and Social Sciences Division, then chaired by economic historian Robert Huttenback. La Belle was denied tenure.

La Belle explored several avenues to protest her declination, and in January 1976 she filed a formal complaint of sex discrimination in employment with the federal Equal Employment Opportunity Commission (EEOC). In the summer of 1976 La Belle accepted a teaching position at California State University, Northridge. In January 1977 The EEOC issued a finding of sex discrimination that was very critical of Caltech, and expressed a willingness to bring a class-action lawsuit against Caltech. This action by the EEOC was one its earliest findings of sex discrimination although the underlying federal legislation had been passed in 1964.

Caltech's position ultimately emerged from consideration by Lew Wasserman for the Board of Trustees and Robert Christy, the provost. Caltech initiated several measures to reduce sex discrimination and acceded to La Belle's reinstatement with promotion to associate professor in 1977 and with reconsideration for tenure in 1979. Years later, La Belle reflected in a Los Angeles Times column on the implications of her history in the larger context of sex discrimination in employment.

== Books ==
- (with Edward Young and Robert N. Essick) Night Thoughts or the Complaint and the Consolation Illustrated by William Blake. Mineola, New York: Dover Publications. 1975. ISBN 9780486292144. OCLC 34410814.
- The Echoing Wood of Theodore Roethke. Princeton University Press. 1976. ISBN 978-0691063126. OCLC 795313716.. The book was very favorably reviewd by Charles Altieri in Criticism.
- (With Robert N. Essick) Flaxman's Illustrations to Homer. New York: Dover Publications. 1977. ISBN 9780486234779. OCLC 715416618.
- Herself Beheld: The Literature of the Looking Glass. Cornell University Press. 1988. ISBN 978-0801422027. OCLC 18072158.. The book was reviewed by Mary Barber in The Los Angeles Times, by Alison Townsend in The Georgia Review, and by Daniel R. Schwarz in The D.H. Lawrence Review.

== Los Angeles Times columns ==
La Belle was a columnist for the Los Angeles Times for several years in the 1990s. The list of her columns includes:

- "Mirror, Mirror on the Wall : Retin-A or face-lift? Diet or liposuction? Eyelids or chin? Reflections on being an age that dares not speak its name". October 6, 1993.
- "Ask Not for Whom La Belle Scolds : Keeping prepositions and infinitives in their place signals respect for rules of grammar and of life". June 15, 1994.
- "A Life Defined by Famous Men". August 3, 1994.
- "Seeing 'Eternity in an Hour' : An unexpected side of the post-Enlightenment poet who wanted to turn the world upside down to get it right". October 26, 1994.
- "Not to Twilight, but to Midnight : Lost words, forgotten memories; then the thief that is Alzheimer's takes even the consciousness of the life that once was". January 25, 1995.
- "PERSPECTIVES ON AFFIRMATIVE ACTION : Is It an Institutional Crutch or Essential to Women's Progress? : A case study from the trenches shows why strong enforcement of non-discrimination must be protected". April 19, 1995.
- "Two Roads Converged in a Wood : A simple life, communing with and communicating through nature, is a quiet man's road less traveled by". June 7, 1995.

== Personal life ==
By 2007, La Belle had lived in one of Dr. A. Schutt's 1927 Pasadena art colony bungalows for a decade. The Los Angeles Times published two stories about the home after La Belle bought it.

== External media ==
"All men have faces, but many women are their faces" — Jenijoy La Belle

- Jenijoy La Belle By Caltech Photographer Floyd Clark. September 1969
- Jenijoy La Belle 1969 California Institute of Technology Image Archive
- Jenijoy La Belle teaches her class in the Millikan Library reflective pool Caltech . May 1970 in Engineering and Science (March 1971), "When the weather gets really hot, you’re liable to find almost anything in the water."
- Hallett Smith and Jenijoy La Belle at the Caltech Athenaeum at Hallett Smith's retirement party Caltech Photographer. May 14, 1971
- Jenijoy La Belle and Robert Christy (in chair) in Caltech’s production of the musical "Fiorello". La Belle plays a chorus girl; Robert F. Christy, plays a radio announcer. Caltech. February 1978
- Jenijoy La Belle (as chorus girl) in "Fiorello". and Richard Feynman (playing a gangster) Caltech . February 1978
- Jenijoy La Belle speaking about William Blake to alums at Seminar Day in San Francisco. Caltech Photographer. October 1979
- Jenijoy La Belle Photographer: Greg Gilbert. 1990s Caltech Archives
- Air Talk with Jenijoy La Belle and John D. Roberts. 19 July 1989 from 6 to 7 PM on KPCC, the National Public Radio affiliate of Pasadena City College
- Night of Stars Part 4 Jenijoy La Belle May 2009 — Olympia High School Alumni via YouTube
- Jenijoy La Belle Oral History Interview
