= Barbara Uehling =

American educator (1932–2020)

4th Chancellor of the University of California, Santa Barbara
- In office 1987–1994
- Preceded by: Robert Huttenback; Daniel G. Aldrich (interim)
- Succeeded by: Henry T. Yang

3rd Chancellor of the University of Missouri
- In office 1978–1987

Personal details
- Education: Wichita State University; Northwestern University (PhD)
- Scientific career
- Fields: Psychotherapy; Clinical psychology
- Thesis: Frequency of associations and similarity of meaning (1958)

Barbara Staner Uehling Charlton (June 12, 1932 – January 2, 2020) was an American psychologist and academic administrator. She served as the 4th chancellor of the University of California, Santa Barbara from 1987 to 1994, as the 3rd chancellor of the University of Missouri Columbia campus from 1978 to 1987, and as the 6th provost of the University of Oklahoma Norman campus from 1976 to 1978.

== Biography ==
Uehling received her undergraduate degree in psychology from Wichita State University in 1954.

She received a PhD in experimental psychology at Northwestern University in 1958.

Uehling served as provost for the University of Oklahoma Norman campus from 1976 to 1978. She served as the 3rd chancellor of the University of Missouri Columbia campus from 1978 to 1987. Then, she served as a senior visiting fellow on the American Council of Education in Washington D.C.. Afterward, she served as 4th chancellor of the University of California, Santa Barbara from 1987 to 1994.

She died from complications of Alzheimer's disease on January 2, 2020. She was 87 years old.

== See also ==
- History of the University of Missouri

Academic offices
Preceded by Herbert W. Schooling	3rd Chancellor of the University of Missouri; 1978-1987	Succeeded by Haskell Monroe
Preceded by Daniel G. Aldrich	4th Chancellor of the University of California, Santa Barbara; 1987–1994	Succeeded by Henry T. Yang
