= Thomas H. Hamilton =

American academic administrator (1914–1979)

Thomas Hale Hamilton (August 4, 1914 – December 25, 1979) was an American academic administrator who served as president of the State University of New York and the University of Hawaii.

A native of Marion, Indiana, Hamilton received his A.B. (1936) from DePauw University and his A.M. (1940) and Ph.D. (1947) from the University of Chicago. While a student at DePauw, he was initiated into the Phi Kappa Psi fraternity. He headed the State University of New York system from 1959, leaving in 1963 to assume the Presidency of the University of Hawaii. Hamilton resigned his presidency in Hawaii over a tenure scandal in 1967.

Thomas Hamilton married the former Virginia Prindiville on June 1, 1940, and raised a son and a daughter. He died in Honolulu at the age of 65. The University of Hawaii's Hamilton Library is named in his honor.

Academic offices
Preceded by William S. Carlson	President of the State University of New York; August 1, 1959 – December 31, 1962	Succeeded by Samuel B. Gould
Preceded by Laurence H. Snyder	President of the University of Hawaii; September, 1963 – December 23, 1967	Succeeded by Robert W. Hiatt
