= John C. Snidecor =

American professor and educator

John Clifton Snidecor (18 October 1907 – 14 December 1983) was an American professor and educator.

== Career ==
He joined the faculty at Santa Barbara College of the University of California (now UCSB) in 1940 and served as acting provost from February to June 1956.

He received his A.B. degree from University of California, Berkeley and his M.A. and Ph.D. degrees from the University of Iowa.

Dr. Snidecor was a specialist in the application of scientific methods to speech and hearing problems. He published widely in speech journals and was the editor and main author of the book, Speech Rehabilitation of the Laryngectomized. He was honored by the California Speech and Hearing Association for his research and elected Fellow of the American Speech and Hearing Association.
