= Kuffner (surname) =

Küffner or Kuffner is a surname. Notable people with the surname include:

- Aaron Kuffner (born 1975), American artist
- Andreas Kuffner (Luftwaffe), recipient of Knight's Cross of the Iron Cross
- Andreas Kuffner (rower) (born 1987), German rower
- James Kuffner (born 1971), Robotics Professor and Researcher
- Joseph Küffner (Kueffner, 1776–1856), German musician and composer
- Moriz von Kuffner (1854–1939), Jewish-Austrian industrialist, art collector, mountaineer and philanthropist
- Ryan Kuffner (born 1996), Canadian ice hockey player
- William Kueffner (1840–1893), officer in the Union Army during the American Civil War
