= Joseph Keble =

Joseph Keble (1632 – 28 August 1710) was an English barrister and law reporter. As well as recording more than four thousand sermons preached in the chapel of Gray's Inn, Keble reported every case heard by the Court of King's Bench from 1661 until his death. Although he was in court every day, he was never known to have had a brief to represent a client.

== Life ==
Keble was the son of Richard Keble, Commissioner of the Great Seal from 1649 to 1654. He was born in 1632 in the parish of St Giles-in-the-Fields, London and educated at the parish school in Holborn. He became a member of Gray's Inn in 1647. He attended the University of Oxford, matriculating from All Souls College in 1651 and obtaining a Bachelor of Civil Law degree in 1654. He was also made a Fellow of Jesus College, Oxford by the Parliamentary commissioners in 1648. He was called to the bar in 1653.

After becoming a barrister, he was never known to have a brief to represent a client in court. However, because the "disease of reporting was so strong upon him", he went to the Court of King's Bench every day from 1661 until his death in 1710 and wrote reports on the cases heard by the Court. He was regarded as a law reporter of considerable note "and of almost incredible industry." Many of his case reports were published as Reports in the court of king's bench...from the 12th to the 30th year of the reign of Charles II (1685). More than 150 handwritten folios and quartos of case reports were left unpublished at his death. His other writings included An Explanation of the Laws against Recusants (1681), and An Assistance to Justices of the Peace (1683). He also recorded more than four thousand sermons preached in the chapel of Gray's Inn.

Keble had one of the first homes at North End, Hampstead, where he lived for part of the week to benefit from the clean air. He died on 28 August 1710 in Holborn and was buried at Tuddenham, Suffolk where he was a property owner.
