= Vernon Cheadle =

American botanist and university administrator

2nd Chancellor of the University of California, Santa Barbara
- In office 1962–1977
- Preceded by: Samuel B. Gould
- Succeeded by: Robert Huttenback

Personal details
- Education: Miami University (BS); Harvard University (PhD)
- Scientific career
- Fields: Botany
- Thesis: Investigations in the anatomy of the liliaceae and the amaryllidaceae (1936)

Vernon Irvin Cheadle (February 6, 1910 – July 23, 1995) was an American botanist who served as the second chancellor of the University of California, Santa Barbara from 1962 to 1977.

He was born in Salem, South Dakota. He graduated magna cum laude from Miami University in Ohio with a bachelor's degree in botany in 1932, and a master's degree and a PhD in botany from Harvard University. His doctoral dissertation in botany was titled Investigations in the anatomy of the liliaceae and the amaryllidaceae (1936).

He was an active masters athlete and held the M75 world record in the shot put, set at his home track at the University of California, Santa Barbara (UCSB) for over a decade.

Cheadle became UCSB's second chancellor at a time when local leaders in Santa Barbara, California had already been fighting tenaciously for several decades to establish a research university in their community. Cheadle gave them what they had desired for so long: the transformation of UCSB from a small liberal arts college into a research university. However, Cheadle was severely traumatized by the turmoil of the anti-Vietnam War era of the late 1960s, when Governor Ronald Reagan declared martial law and deployed heavily armed California National Guard troops to the UCSB campus. As a result, Cheadle became so passive for the remainder of his chancellorship that from 1972 to 1977, real power on campus lay in the hands of Vice Chancellor Alec Alexander.

Academic offices
Preceded by Samuel B. Gould	Chancellor of the University of California, Santa Barbara; 1962–1977	Succeeded by Robert Huttenback
