= Robert Huttenback =

Robert A. Huttenback

3rd Chancellor of the University of California, Santa Barbara
- In office 1977–1986
- Preceded by: Vernon Cheadle
- Succeeded by: Daniel G. Aldrich (acting); Barbara Uehling

Personal details
- Born: March 8, 1928 Frankfurt am Main, Germany
- Died: June 10, 2012 (aged 84) Camarillo, California, U.S.
- Spouse: Freda
- Education: University of California, Los Angeles (BA, PhD)
- Scientific career
- Fields: Modern history
- Thesis: British relations with Sind, 1799–1843: a case study in the dynamics of imperialism (1959)

Robert Arthur Huttenback (March 8, 1928 – June 10, 2012) was the third chancellor of UC Santa Barbara from 1977 to 1986. He was ousted from the post in July 1986 after allegations surfaced that he and his wife Freda had embezzled US$174,087 from the university to perform renovations on their home. After two University of California presidents (David P. Gardner and David S. Saxon) testified against him, Huttenback and his wife were convicted by a Santa Maria jury in July 1988.

Huttenback was a German Jew whose family fled to England in 1933 when he was a young boy. Although his family lived in England for only about six years before moving again to the United States, Huttenback spoke English with a British accent for the rest of his life.

Huttenback received a Bachelor of Arts in 1951 and a Doctor of Philosophy with a historical dissertation in 1959, both from the University of California, Los Angeles. Before returning to UCLA to earn his doctorate, Huttenback served in the U.S. Army during the Korean War. His doctoral dissertation in modern history was titled British relations with Sind, 1799–1843: a case study in the dynamics of imperialism (1959).

From 1960 to 1977, he was a professor at the California Institute of Technology. He was a lifelong specialist in the history of British imperialism. Huttenback blocked the tenureship of Jenijoy La Belle multiple times, who became Caltech's first female professor when his decision was overturned.

Academic offices
Preceded by Vernon Cheadle	Chancellor of the University of California, Santa Barbara; 1977–1986	Succeeded by Daniel G. Aldrich
