= Samuel B. Gould =

American educator

Samuel Gould

1st Chancellor of the University of California, Santa Barbara
- In office 1959–1962
- Preceded by: Elmer Noble (acting)
- Succeeded by: Vernon Cheadle

Samuel Brookner Gould (1910–1997) was the 1st chancellor of the University of California, Santa Barbara from 1959 to 1962.

== Early life ==
Samuel Gould was born in Shelton, Connecticut, on October 11, 1910. He attended Bates College in Maine, graduating in 1930. He then attended Oxford University briefly in 1931 but left due to financial difficulties. He next worked for New England Telephone and Telegraph until accepting a teaching position in English at William Hall High School in West Hartford, Connecticut (1932–38). From 1938 to 1947, Gould headed the department of speech at Brookline High School in Massachusetts while working on his Ph.D. at Harvard University. He had previously completed his M.A. at New York University.

== Career ==
He served in the Navy as a Lt. Commander, PTD, during World War II. After the war, he helped establish Boston University's Communications Department and served as an assistant to the president from 1951 to 1953. In 1954, Gould became president of Antioch College in Ohio, a position he held until he was appointed 2nd Chancellor of the University of California, Santa Barbara in 1959. UCSB expanded its academic program under his leadership. In July 1962, Gould became president of the Educational Broadcasting System in New York with the flagship station, WNDT-TV, channel 13.

In 1964, Gould was appointed President of the State University of New York. During his administration, SUNY underwent its greatest physical and academic expansion and consolidation. Gould's vision for SUNY went beyond a desire to establish a traditional university system. He included in the university system new technologies such as television and non-traditional study opportunities such as those provided by the Empire State College teacher-mentor system. In 1967, his title was changed to Chancellor of the State University of New York. Under his tenure, the concept of granting academic credit for non-academic experience was initiated.

In 1970, Gould retired from SUNY, became Chancellor Emeritus and served briefly as a director at McKinsey and Company. From 1971 to 1974, he served as the chairman of the Carnegie Commission on Non-Traditional Study which attempted to modify and set new goals for education. During the 1970s Gould worked periodically with the Venezuelan Ministry of Education in developing that nation's university system. He accompanied Vice President Nelson Rockefeller, a close personal friend, on his 1977 tour of Latin America. From 1976 to 1977, he served as interim chancellor for higher education for the State of Connecticut. He has also served as a trustee of the Teachers Insurance and Annuity Association and on the Commission for Post-Secondary Educational Planning in Florida.

== Death and legacy ==
Gould died on July 11, 1997.

Academic offices
Preceded by Douglas McGregor	President of Antioch College; 1954 – 1959	Succeeded by James P. Dixon
New office	Chancellor of the University of California, Santa Barbara; 1959 – 1962	Succeeded by Vernon Cheadle
Preceded by Thomas H. Hamilton	President of the State University of New York; September 1, 1964 – January 11, 1967	Office abolished
New office	Chancellor of the State University of New York; January 12, 1967 – January 11, 1967	Succeeded by Ernest L. Boyer
