= Richard Keble =

English lawyer and judge (died 1683/84)

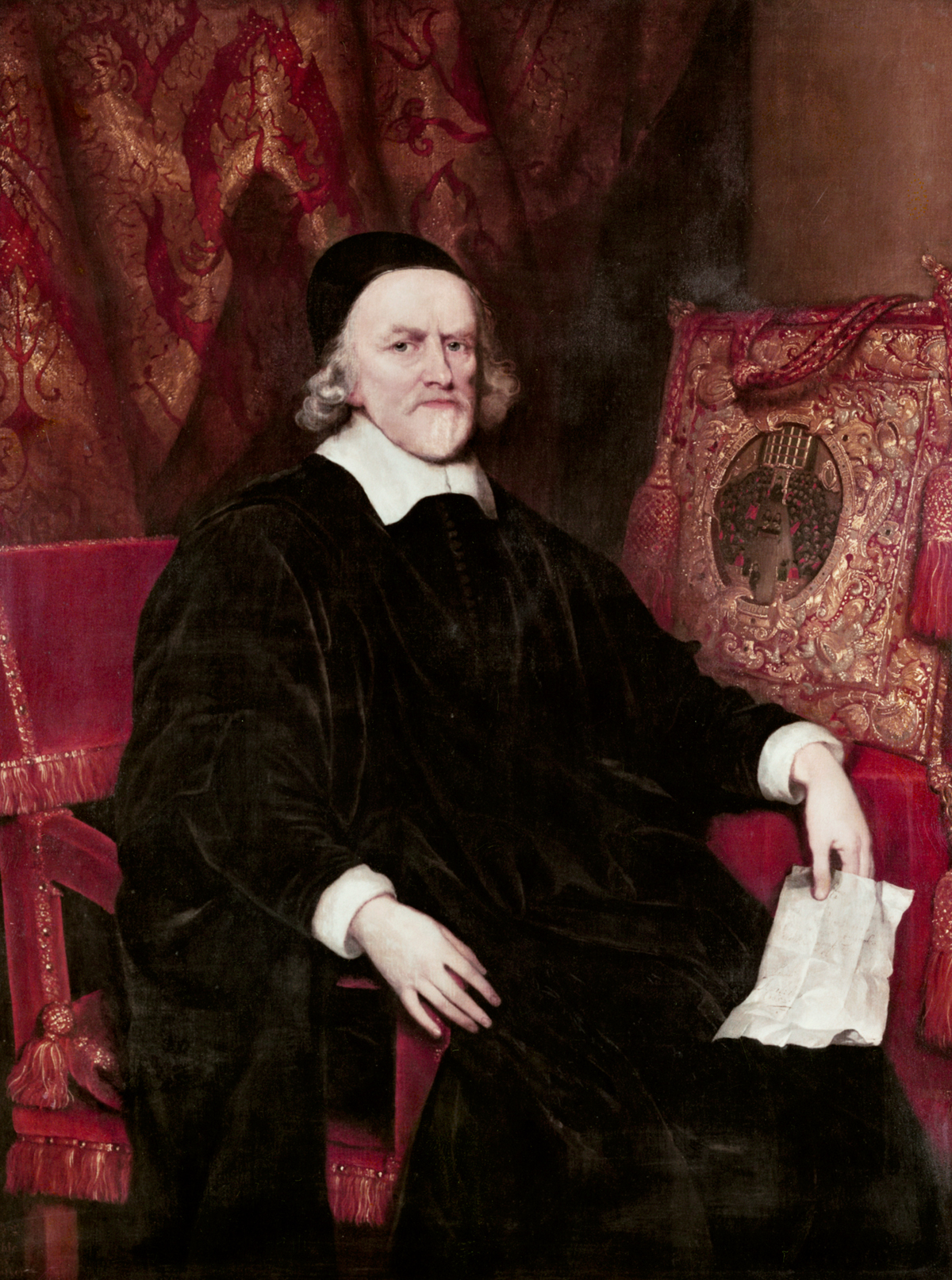
Keble as Lord Commissioner

Richard Keble (died 1683/84) was an English lawyer and judge, a supporter of the Parliamentarian cause during the English Civil War. During the early years of the Interregnum he was a Keeper of the Great Seal. He was also an active judge who presided at several high-profile trials. At the Restoration under a provision in the Indemnity and Oblivion Act he was forbidden from holding further public offices.

== Life ==
Richard Keble was from Suffolk, of an old family settled at Old Newton. He was admitted a member of Gray's Inn, on 7 August 1609. He was called to the bar on 14 July 1614, and became an ancient of the inn in 1632 and Lent Reader in 1639. He is first mentioned in George Croke's "Reports" in 1636. Parliament appointed him a judge in Wales in March 1647, and he became a serjeant-at-law in 1648.

During 1648 Keble was sent to Norwich to handle a mutiny. After the execution of Charles I in 1649 he was appointed the junior of the three Lord Commissioners (along with Bulstrode Whitelocke and John Lisle) who had the custody of the Great Seal, they each having a salary of £1000 per annum. With William Lenthall, acting as the Master of the Rolls, Keble and Whitelocke issued a set of working rules for the Court of Chancery, while further reform was being deliberated.

Keble presided at two significant trials: that of John Lilburne the Leveller in October 1649, and that of the Presbyterian plotter Christopher Love in 1651. At Love's trial he declared that "whatsoever is not consonant to Scripture in the Law of England, is not the Law of England". Thomas Widdrington replaced him as Lord Commissioner in April 1654. The reasons were largely political, Keble having made enemies as a high court justice.

Keble's salary was irregularly paid, and his petition for payment of what was owed, was presented in 1655, and still disregarded in 1658. At the Restoration Keble was excepted from the Indemnity and Oblivion Act (under Section XLIII which forbade him from accepting a public office). His will, dated April 1673, was proved in August 1684.

== Reputation ==
In 1660 at the restoration of the monarchy it was alleged that, during the Interregnum, Keble had acted arbitrarily against Royalists and this was the reason he was excepted from the general pardon under the Indemnity and Oblivion Act.

Hilkiah Bedford, a political opponent, called him "an insolent, mercenary pettifogger," who without jury or evidence sent to the gallows any he suspected of royalism. The Lilburne and Love trials were typical of common law procedure. On the other hand, the Love trial, where Christopher Love's guilt was not seriously in doubt, has been described as a "demonstration of the republic's brute power dressed up as legal sovereignty". Edward Foss wrote that Keble apparently acted "with less unfairness and severity" than colleagues. A near contemporary and historian, Laurence Echard, in his History of England speaks of Keble as being then a man of "little practical experience".

== Family ==
Keble married Mary Sickelmor. Joseph Keble was their fourth son.
