= J. Harold Williams =

American professor and educator

J. Harold Williams (December 18, 1888 – June 2, 1981) was an American professor and educator. He received his A.B., M.A. and Ph.D. degrees from Stanford University, and worked as a lecturer and professor at UCLA from 1923 to 1946.

In 1946, Dr. Williams was appointed Provost of the Santa Barbara College of the University of California (Now UCSB), succeeding Clarence L. Phelps who had been president of the state college since 1918 and the first provost after the change to university status in 1944.
