= Ida Ivanka Kubler =

Bulgarian painter (born 1978)

- Ivanka D. Angelova
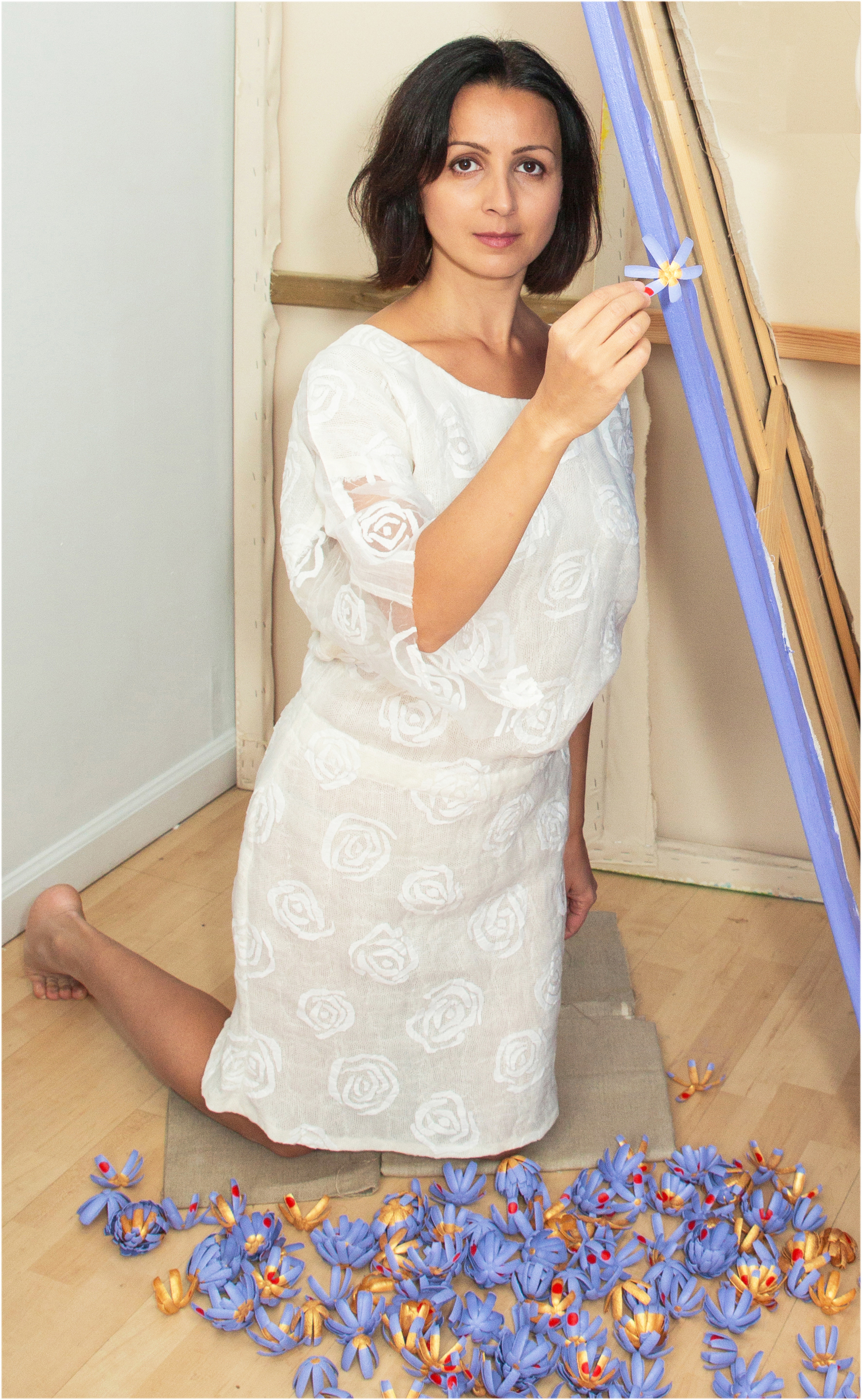
- Kubler in her Manhattan Studio creating The Birth of an Idea XXXVIII, Silk Cocoons on Canvas
- Born: January 3, 1978 (age 48); Haskovo, Bulgaria
- Education: Chelsea College of Arts; Bielefeld University of Applied Sciences and Arts; National Academy of Art
- Known for: Contemporary artist
- Notable work: The Birth of an Idea Series; The Letter Series
- Style: Expressionism
- Spouses: Sylvain Kubler (m. 2002; div. 2011) Alex Hamilton (m. 2021; div. 2022)
- Website: idaivanka.art

Signature
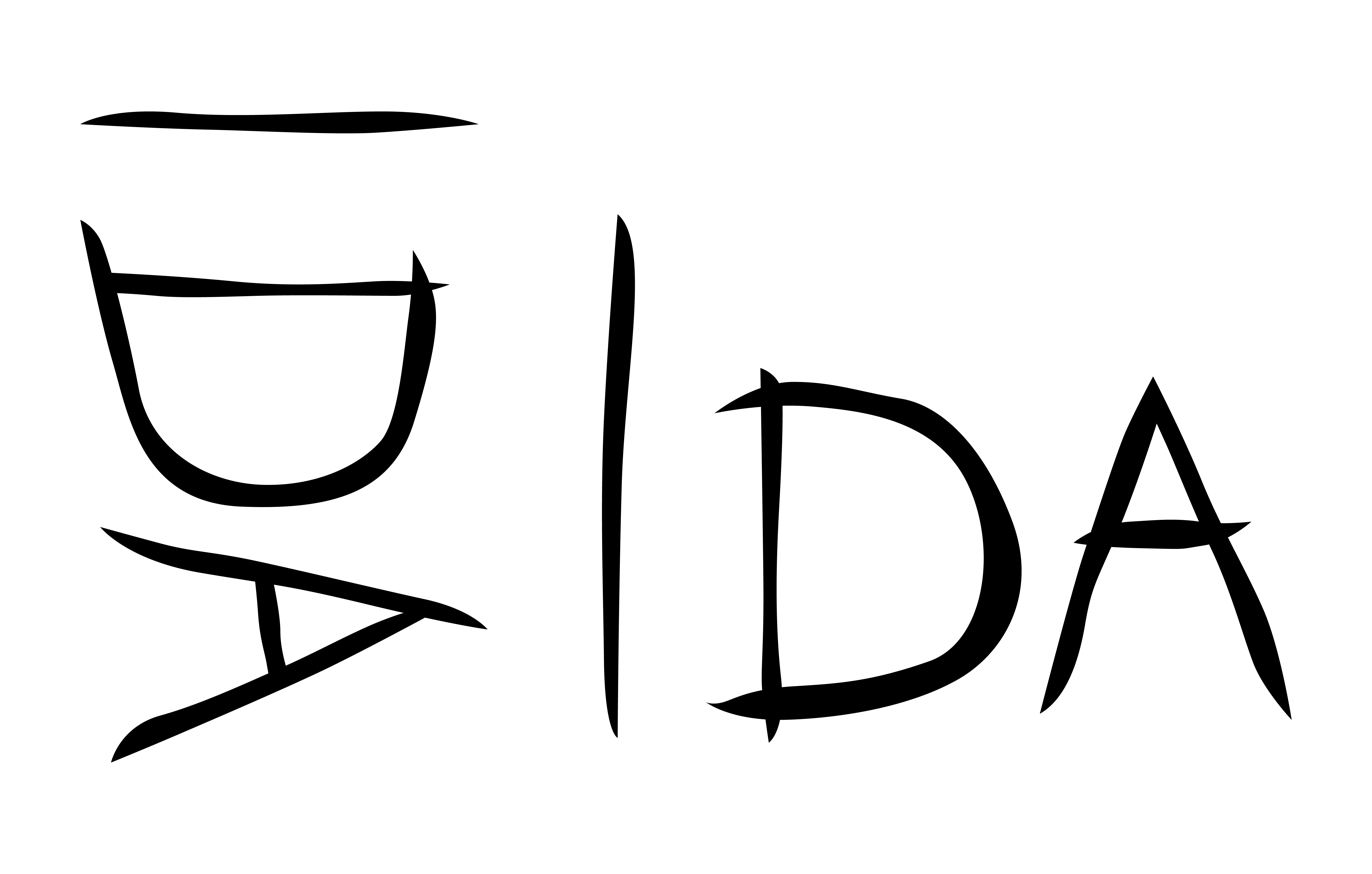

Ida Ivanka Kubler (born January 3, 1978) is an international artist known for her use of recycled materials, including silk cocoons, in abstract and conceptual works. Her style incorporates elements of Abstract Expressionism and Color Field painting. Kubler has exhibited in New York, London, Seoul, and Málaga, and her work has been featured in projects exploring visual aesthetics and well-being.

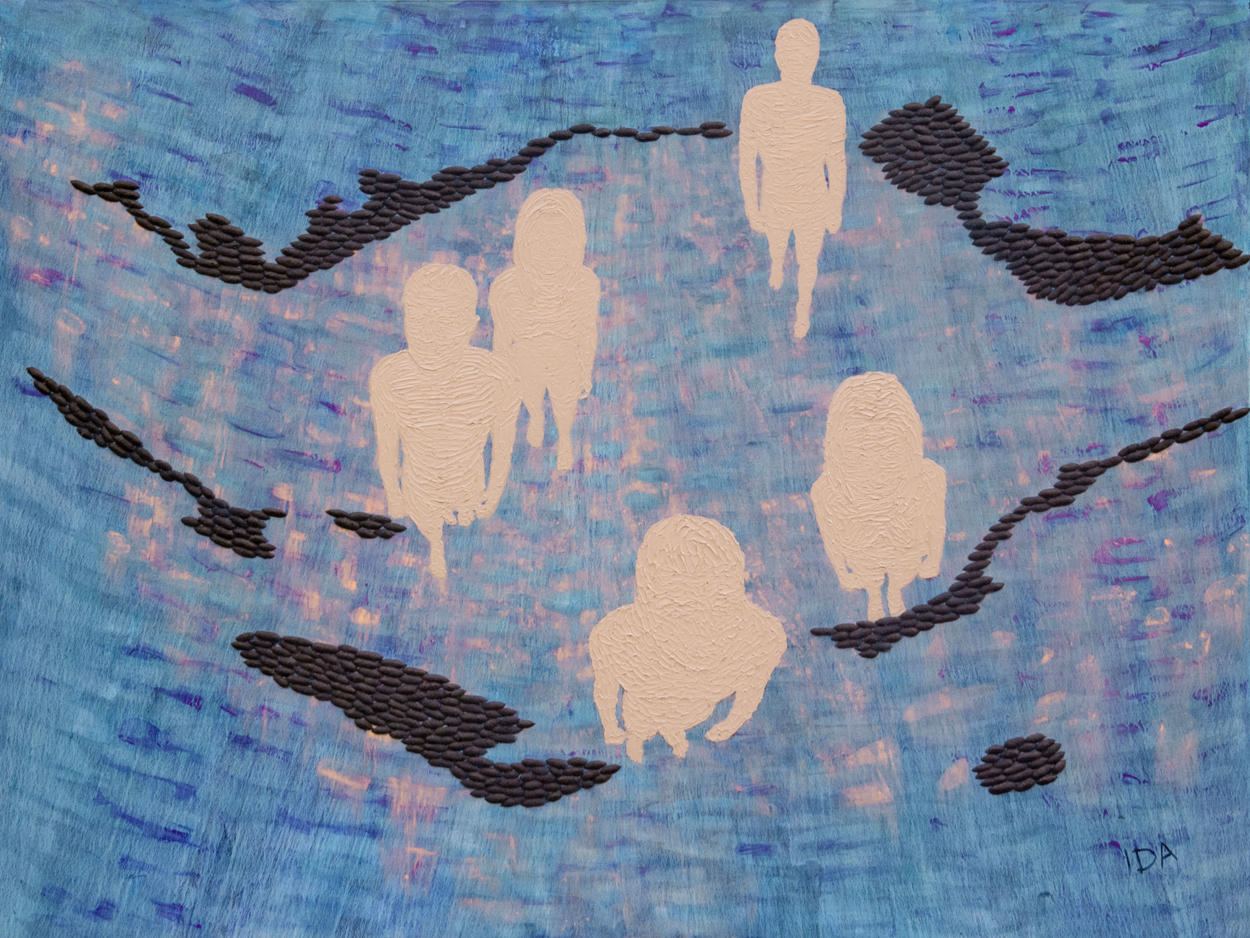
The Thing II, Silk Cocoons and Old Holland Oil Impasto, Private Collection London, UK

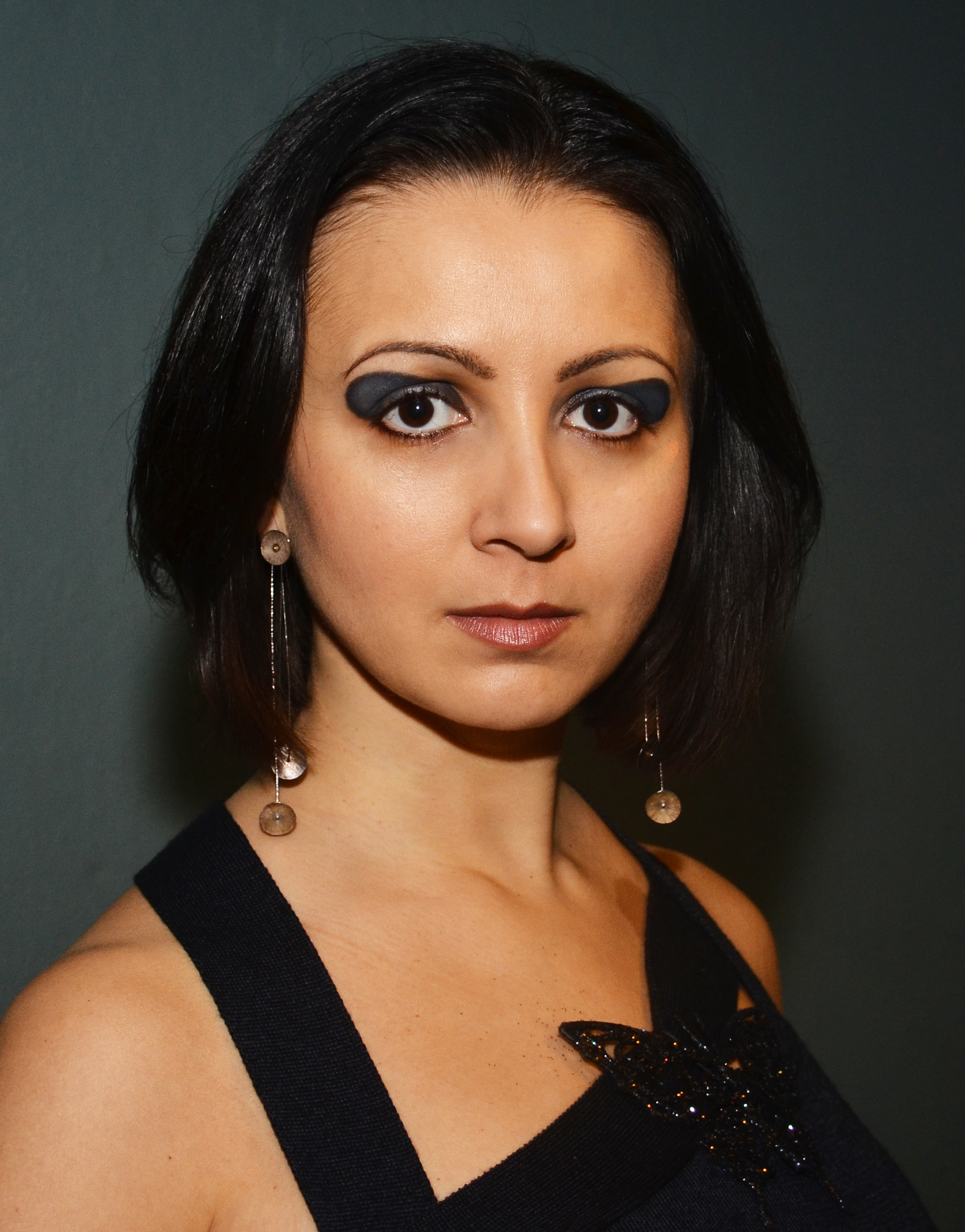
Ida at the Arts Club in Dover Street 2011, London, UK

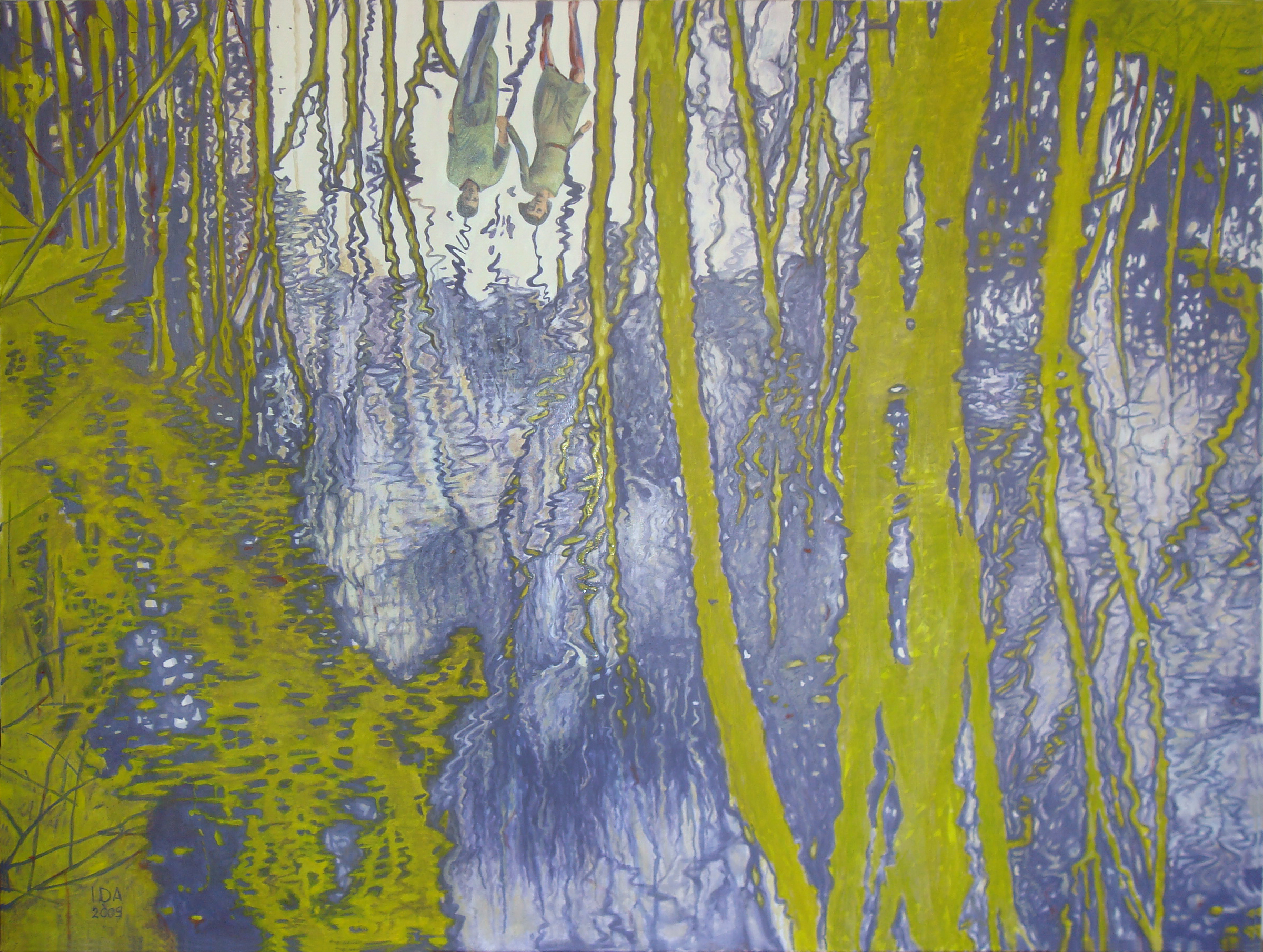
Non Material III, Multilayered Old Holland Oil on Canvas

== Work ==
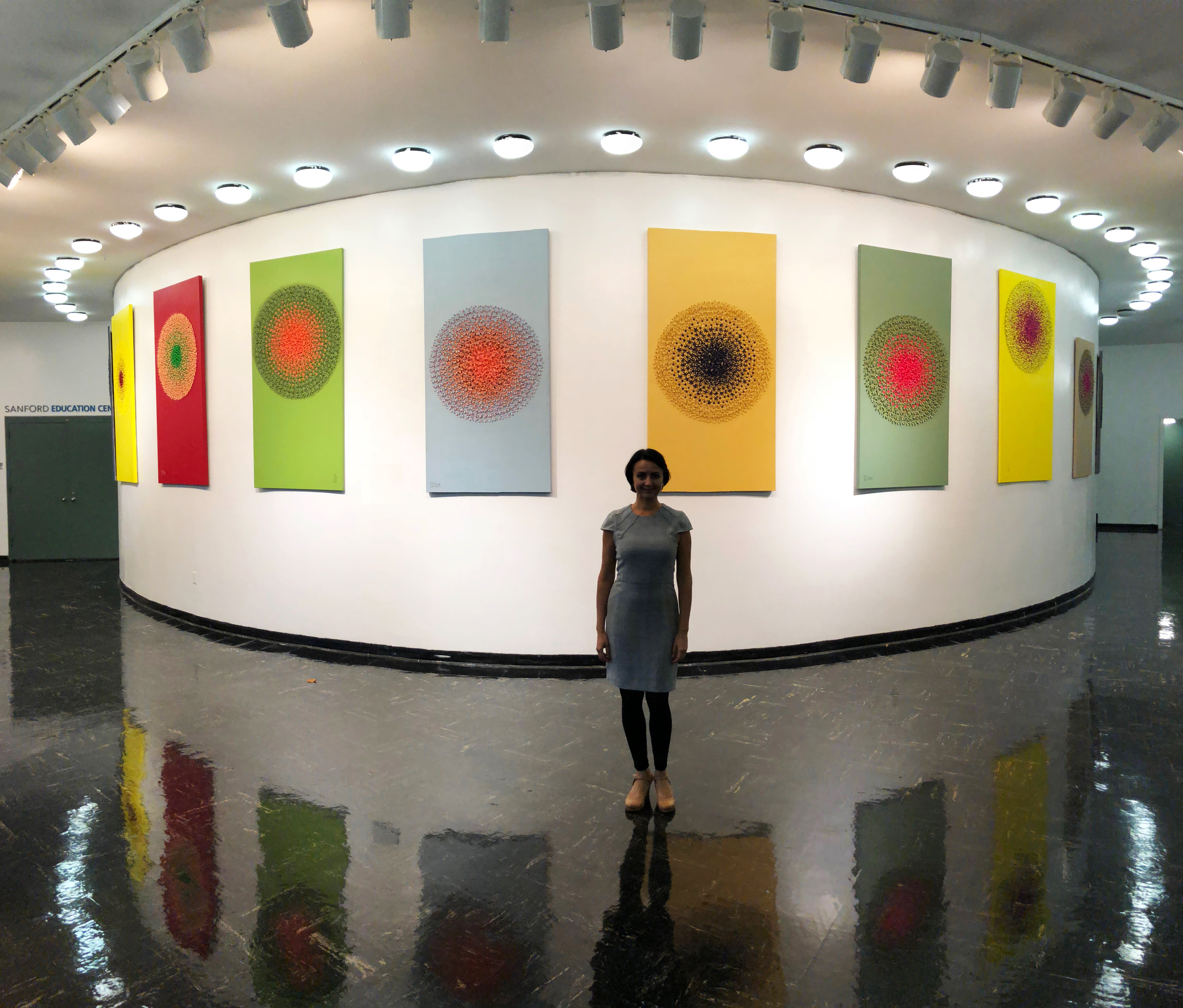
Ida in front of her The Birth of an Idea solo show, Salena Gallery, 2018

Kubler's artwork features recycled materials and other objects, including silk cocoons, feathers, tree branches and other materials. Color is an inspiration to Kubler and her work. The genre of her work is a blend of Abstract Expressionism and Color Field painting. In her early years she practiced painting in a naturalistic realistic manner, focusing mostly on figures, portraits, still life and landscapes. Her style evolved as she experimented with different theories, techniques, and ideas.

Notable series are The Birth of an Idea, which have been described as "Organic in appearance; abstract in presence. They have a being and an atmosphere that transmits to the viewer calmness and vibrancy at once". I felt touched and enlightened". The simple circle settings consisting of an abundance of sculptured silk cocoons on a large canvas. The cocoons are painted, manipulated and positioned. Kubler has created two and three colour versions of the series, some with additional elements like ink markings or red and blue dots. "The art is at once transcendentally primitive embodying a universal oneness of geometric circle, with a subtle play of patterns "A reinvention of Indian Mandalas or reminiscent of mosaic in Ancient Greece, an assemblage and repetition of small particles. In modern parlance the repetition in Kubler’s artwork could be seen as deconstructed pixelation". 'The Birth of an Idea' was included in 'Placebos for Art' a project undertaken by the Behring Institute for Medical Research and was judged to have positive influence on public health.

"The Thing" series, oil and cocoons on canvas, also border between abstraction and figuration, but Kubler used boldly the impasto technique. The painterly imagery is sublime: half-abstract groups of nudes walking in the nothingness.

Kubler also created performance art to The Birth of an Idea series but this artwork consists from red and white stones arranged in a circle. The natural setting of nature, river and mountains creates a sublime scene which connects with the idea of the universe. As part of the universe we feel stronger, more secure and confident. The circle draws us in and we lose the ego.

In addition, Kubler has developed two other series. The "Non Material" series. These are paintings, oil on canvas, depicting scenes on the border between abstraction and realism and are dreamy-ghost-like paintings.

One of the artworks was used as a fundraiser for cancer treatment centres. This series are about the freedom in space, as you can hang them horizontally, vertically, on the ceiling, floating in the air; as singles or in groups.

Additionally Kubler developed "The Letter" series; sculptured atmospheric scribbles. At the same time gives an impression of different roads, a large universe with planets in it, waves of an ocean, something endless, or the today's uprooting in a physical and direct sense.

== Notable exhibitions ==
Kubler has exhibited in New York (VOLTA, 2019; Selena Gallery, 2018; Chinatown Soup Gallery, May 2016; Sohotel Artspace April 2015; Dejavu Gallery previously Bodley Gallery November 2015), KIAF Seoul, Malaga, Spain (Stoa Gallery, December 2015) and London (Store Street Gallery April 2013; Chance Gallery, October 2013).
