= Maria Susanna Kübler =

Swiss cookbook writer

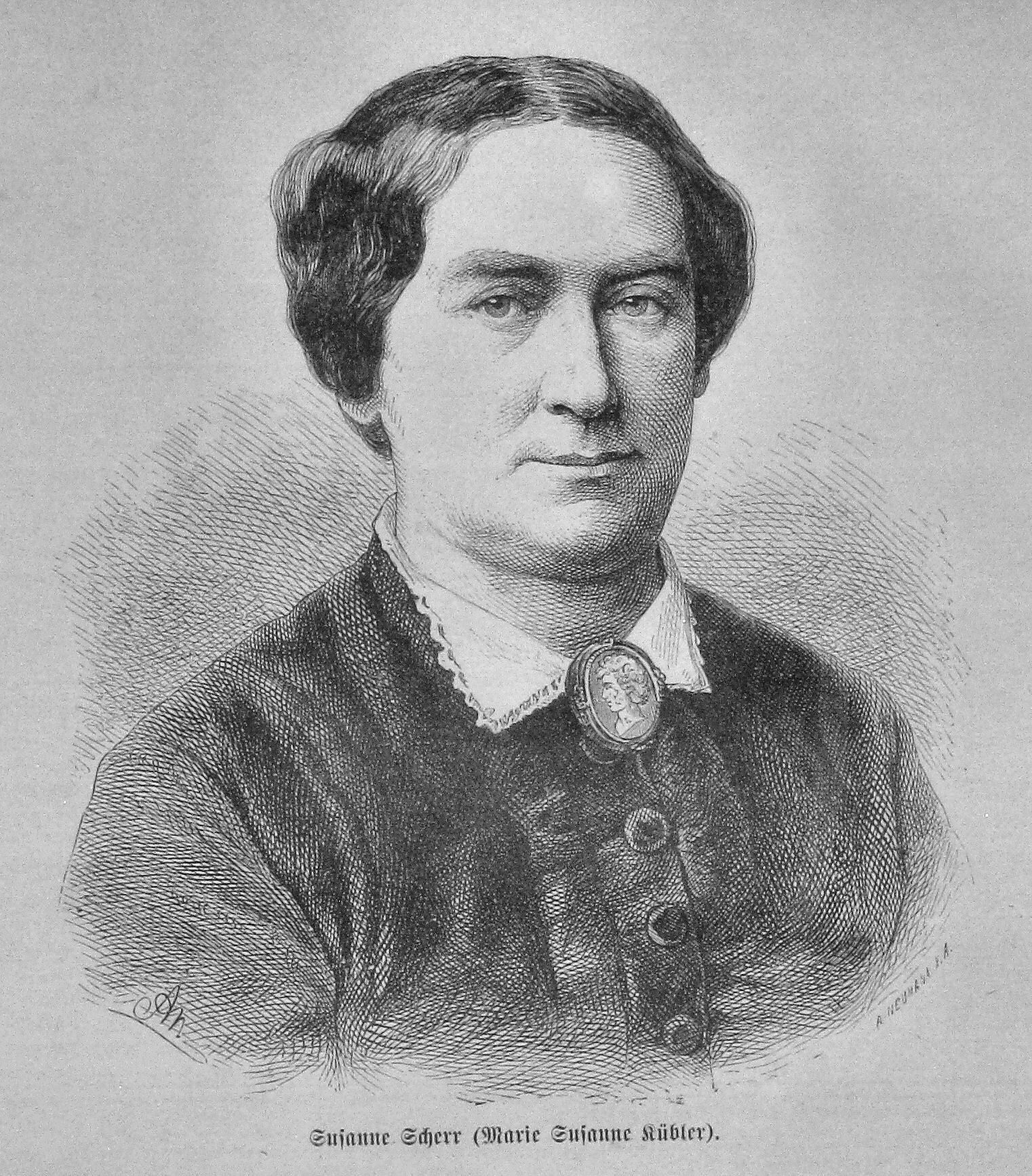
Maria Susanna Kübler

Maria Susanna (also Susanne) Kübler (1814–1873) was a Swiss writer who is remembered for her housekeeping guides and cookbooks, especially the popular Das Hauswesen (Housekeeping, 1850) which also contained recipes.

== Biography ==
Born on 27 February 1814 in Winterthur, Maria Kübler was the daughter of the teacher Jakob Kübler and the sister of Jakob Kübler (1827–1899), who from 1851 was a clergyman in Neftenbach. In 1834, she married the merchant Jakob Heinrich Haggenmacher. Following their divorce, in 1845 she married Johannes Scherr, a German-born writer, schoolteacher, college professor and political activist.

Kübler studied English, French and Italian at Yverdon in French-speaking Switzerland. In 1845, she moved to Stuttgart, Germany, with her second husband but returned to Switzerland in 1849 after he ran into political difficulties. Kübler returned to Winterthur in 1852 and from 1860 lived in Zürich. She worked as a translator, language teacher and writer of household guides and cookbooks.

== Selected publications ==
In 1850, she published Das Hauswesen (full title: Das Hauswesen: Nach seinem ganzen Umfang dargestellt in Briefen an eine Freundin or Housekeeping: Described in its Entirety in Letters to a Friend). She went on to publish several more household guides and cookbooks as well as children's stories. These include:

- Der Frauenspiegel (1854)
- Die Hausmutter (1857)
- Mährchen und Geschichtenbuch der Fee Chrysalinde (children's stories, 1857)
- Die geschickte Köchin (1858)
- Das Buch der Mütter (on child care and upbringing, 1867)
