= J. Russell Nelson =

American educator (1929–2016)

14th President of Arizona State University
- In office 1981–1990
- Preceded by: John W. Schwada
- Succeeded by: Lattie F. Coor

Personal details
- Born: December 18, 1929 Portland, Oregon, U.S.
- Died: March 23, 2016 (aged 86) Tempe, Arizona, U.S.
- Education: Pacific Union College (MBA); University of California Los Angeles (J.D.)
- Profession: University President, Associate Professor

Jack Russell Nelson (December 18, 1929 – March 23, 2016) was an American educator who served as a chancellor/president of the University of Colorado Boulder and Arizona State University in Tempe, Arizona.

== Life ==
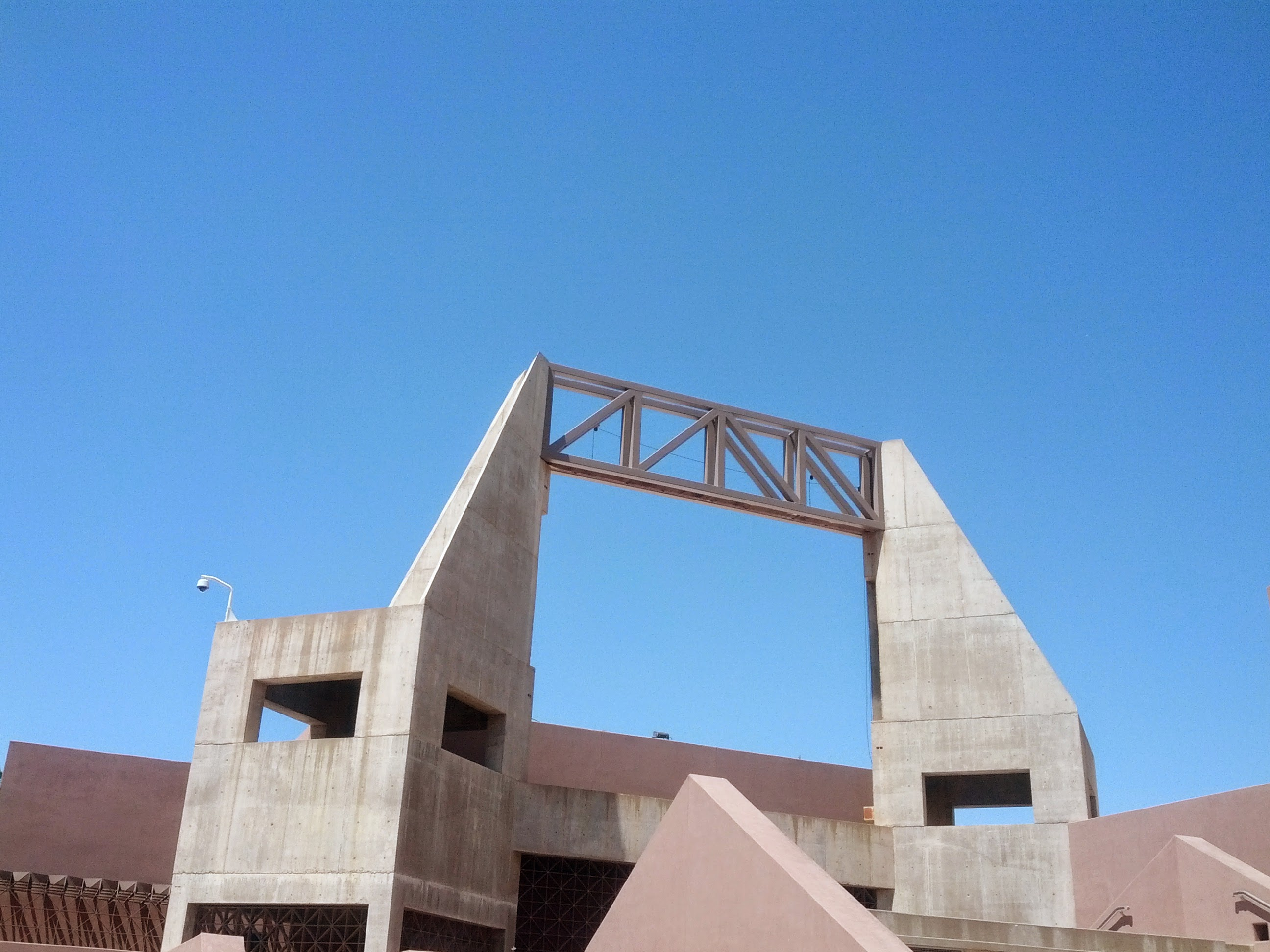
The Fine Arts Center at Arizona State University, named for J. Russell Nelson

Nelson earned his bachelor's degree in business and economics from Pacific Union College in Napa Valley, California, and a Master of Business Administration and Ph.D in finance from the University of California Los Angeles.

From 1961-1970, Nelson served as an associate professor in finance at the University of Minnesota.

In 1970, Nelson moved to become vice provost and professor in finance at the University of Colorado Boulder. During his first stint at the university he was rapidly promoted, to associate provost (in 1971), vice president for budgets and planning (1972–74), vice president of administration (1974–77) until becoming acting chancellor in 1977 and chancellor in 1978.

=== ASU presidency ===
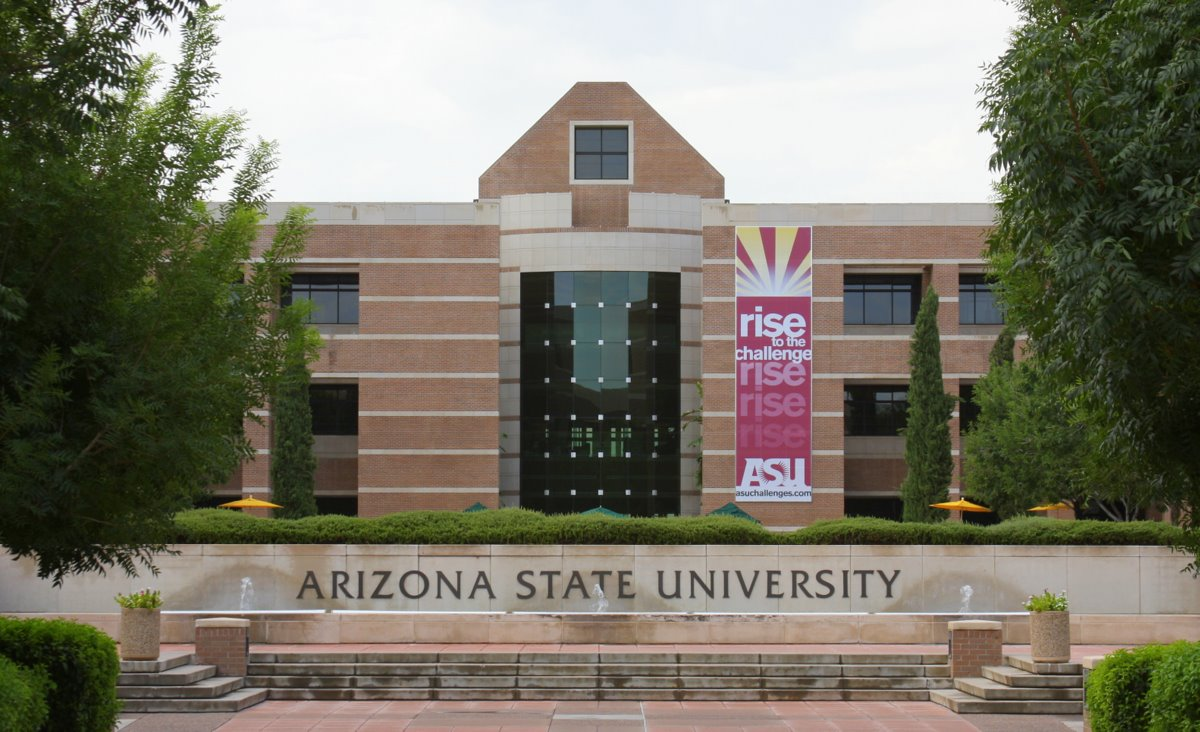
Nelson spearheaded the development of ASU West (Fletcher Library pictured)

In 1981, Nelson became the fourteenth president of Arizona State University. Under Nelson, the university focused on education, upgrading its computer infrastructure, and expanding to a second campus.

Nelson's presidency was marked by a combative tenure with the athletics department, which fell into disrepute after losing seasons and ethics scandals. However, Nelson oversaw the construction of the Karsten Golf Course and started the first efforts to bring a Super Bowl to the Phoenix area.

In 1988, the Arizona Board of Regents authorized funding for a Computing and Network Services Building, which was billed as a "computing union" for students to have access to technology for their classes. The building did not break ground until February 1991, two years after Nelson departed the university. Nelson also brought the university to western Maricopa County, a vision first seen by G. Homer Durham in the 1960s. ASU West opened in 1984, and ground was broken in 1986 on the permanent campus facility.

The university also grew more adept at fundraising. In 1984, work was completed on an expansion to the College of Business Administration and a new research building for the school of engineering. Initiated in the late 1980s, the Campaign for ASU raised more than $75 million and led to the construction of a profusion of new buildings toward the end of Nelson's tenure, including an expanded Hayden Library, a second Memorial Union expansion and an additional building for the College of Architecture. One of these buildings, the Fine Arts Center designed by Antoine Predock, was named for Nelson and his wife Bonita. Research grants also doubled from 1981 to 1989.

Nelson resigned in 1989 to return to Boulder and lead CU's College of Business Administration. Richard Peck, a former English professor and then-provost and vice president of academic affairs, was named as interim president, serving until the installation of Lattie F. Coor on January 1, 1990. Nelson retired from academia in 1992.

Nelson died at his Tempe home on March 23, 2016 of complications of Alzheimer's disease.
