= Daniel Aldrich =

American academic (1918–1990)

Daniel G. Aldrich, Jr.
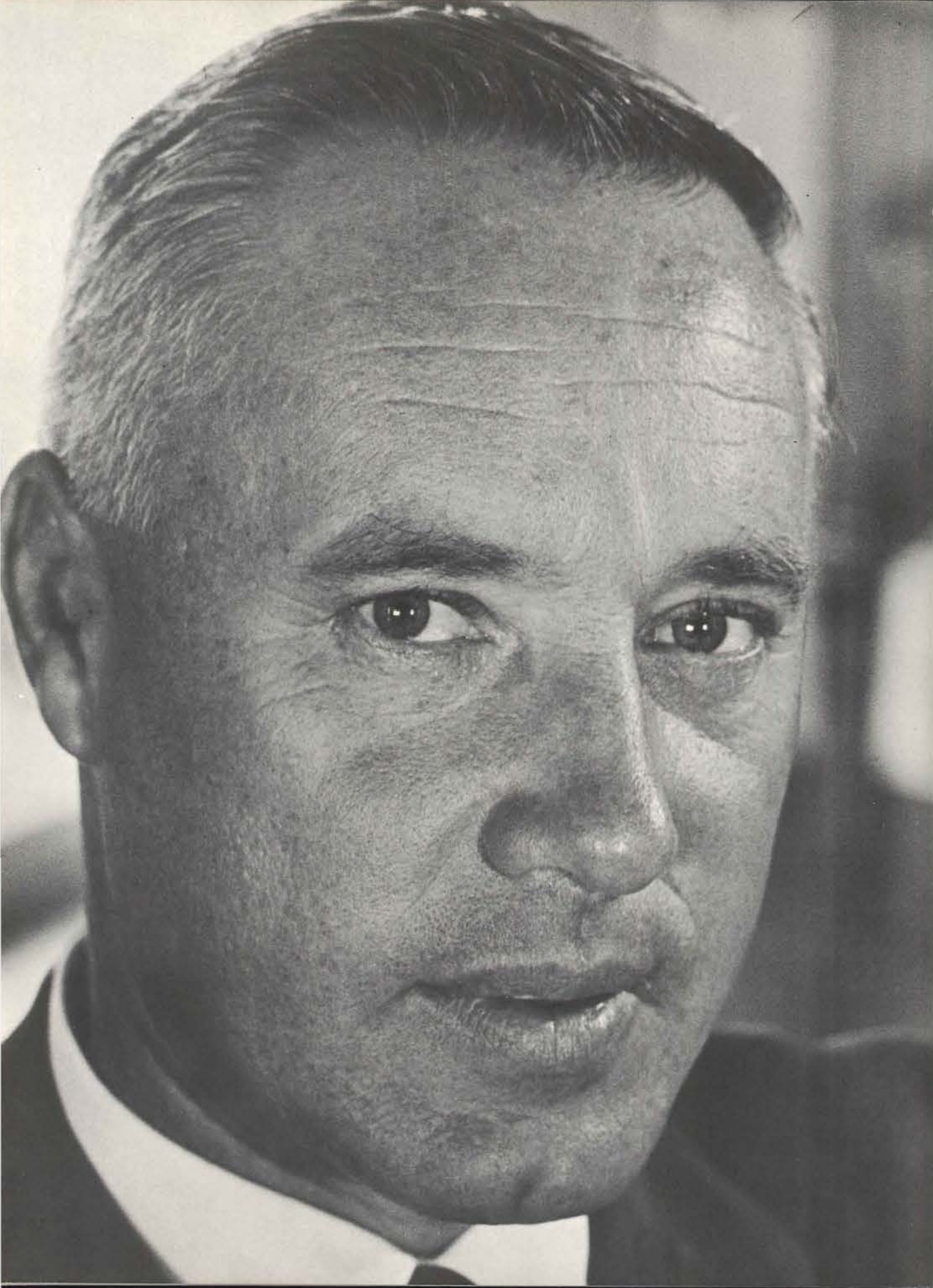
- Aldrich in 1966

1st Chancellor of the University of California, Irvine
- In office 1962–1984
- Succeeded by: Jack Peltason

Acting Chancellor of the University of California, Santa Barbara
- In office 1986–1987

Acting Chancellor of the University of California, Riverside
- In office 1984–1985

Personal details
- Born: July 12, 1918 Northwood, New Hampshire
- Died: April 9, 1990 (aged 71) Orange County, California
- Education: University of Rhode Island (BS); University of Arizona (MS); University of Wisconsin–Madison (PhD)
- Scientific career
- Fields: Agriculture
- Thesis: Controlled hydration of montmorillonite and hydrous mica and its influence on their x-ray diffraction patterns (1943)

Daniel Gaskill Aldrich, Jr. (July 12, 1918 – April 9, 1990) was the founding chancellor at the University of California, Irvine from 1962 to 1984. He also served as acting chancellor at the University of California, Santa Barbara from 1986 to 1987 and acting chancellor at the University of California, Riverside from 1984 to 1985.

== Career ==
=== Education ===
Aldrich received a B.S. degree in agriculture from the University of Rhode Island in 1939. He then received a M.S. at the University of Arizona in 1941. He met Jean Hamilton, his wife-to-be, during his time there. He received his PhD by continuing his studies of soil chemistry at the University of Wisconsin in 1943.

Aldrich's doctoral dissertation in agriculture was titled Controlled hydration of montmorillonite and hydrous mica and its influence on their x-ray diffraction patterns (1943).

=== Career ===
In 1944, he began his association with the University of California system as a junior chemist at the Citrus Experimental Station at Riverside. In 1955, he was appointed chair of the soils departments at the University of California, Berkeley and University of California, Davis (joint appointments were common before much of the College of Agriculture was transferred to and consolidated at the Davis campus). In 1958, he was appointed the dean of the College of Agriculture.

In 1962, UC President Clark Kerr selected Aldrich to be the founding chancellor of the University of California, Irvine. In his memoirs, Kerr wrote many chapters depicting everything that went wrong at the other UC campuses—especially Berkeley and Santa Cruz—but had only fond memories of Aldrich and Irvine: "Aldrich fitted Irvine to perfection. I never considered any other possibilities for recommendation to the regents." Kerr remembered that Aldrich had only one defect: he was a strict teetotaler who did not allow alcoholic beverages to be served in his home. Kerr later noticed that as chancellor, Aldrich had started to serve such beverages as a social courtesy to guests, and joked with him that Aldrich had taken his first "big step" towards "skid row."

=== UC Irvine chancellorship ===
As Irvine's founding chancellor, Aldrich carried out a mandate from President Kerr and the Regents of the University of California to take the new campus from blueprints to a functional academic institution within three years. His background in agriculture influenced his intent to make the campus environmentally friendly. This environmental groundwork contributes to UCI's high ranking green program today. Aldrich was responsible for actively recruiting UCI's first faculty and students. William Pereira was one of the first faculty members recruited. Together they planned the 21-acre park located in the middle of campus today, along with many other buildings.

Aldrich was officially inaugurated as the first chancellor on May 20, 1965. Students decorated the school's library to celebrate the event. Students called him "Chancellor Dan" and his door was always open to their concerns.

=== Retirement ===
Aldrich retired from the chancellorship in 1984. The Board of Regents named the park in the middle of campus "Aldrich Park" in his honor.

One indicator of the quality of Aldrich's leadership skills is that UC President David P. Gardner called upon him twice to come out of retirement to serve as acting chancellor at two other UC campuses then in crisis. Aldrich served as acting chancellor at Riverside from 1984 to 1985 after the sudden death of Tomás Rivera, and again at Santa Barbara from 1986 to 1987 after Robert Huttenback was accused of embezzling university funds to remodel his off-campus home. About this, Gardner later wrote that Aldrich was known as UC's "utility chancellor," and "was loved and effective wherever he served."

Aldrich remained involved in athletics throughout his retirement including coaching Little League Baseball and winning medals in the Senior Olympics. In 2007, the Administration Building was named Aldrich Hall. In 2010 Aldrich was elected to the USATF Masters Hall of Fame.

He died on April 9, 1990, having served the University of California for 47 years.
