= Clark G. Kuebler =

American professor and educator (1908–1974)

Clark George Kuebler (24 March 1908 – 28 March 1974 (aged 66)) was an American professor and educator. He received his A.B. from Northwestern University and his Ph.D. from the University of Chicago. He became a member of the Sigma Chi fraternity during his college years.

He was president of the Episcopal Church National Council of Churchmen for several years.

He was in the classics department of Northwestern University from 1930 to 1943. He was the seventh president of Ripon College from 1943 to 1954 and the third provost of the Santa Barbara College of the University of California (now the University of California, Santa Barbara) for a short period in 1955.

Kuebler resigned from the position of provost after only nine months, when he was accused of propositioning a male detective he had just met while visiting New York City to recruit faculty members. He was arrested by the New York City Police Department on suspicion of assault and loitering in a public place to solicit "a crime against nature". Kuebler maintained his innocence and the charges were later dropped, but his academic career was over. In the conservative 1950s, a mere accusation of homosexuality "regardless of ... veracity or outcome" was often fatal to an academic career. This was around the same time as the Lavender Scare in the federal government. Future UC President Clark Kerr (then serving as chancellor at Berkeley) avoided mentioning Kuebler by name in his memoirs and instead referred to a provost who "quickly disappeared under less than glorious circumstances".

Kuebler later entered private business in Brazil. In 1965, he was on the board of the Fulbright Commission in Brazil.

Kuebler died in Rio de Janeiro on March 28, 1974.
