= Clarence L. Phelps =

Ffirst provost of the University of California, Santa Barbara

Clarence Lucien Phelps (January 8, 1881 – May 7, 1964) was the first provost of the University of California, Santa Barbara.

Phelps served as president of UCSB's predecessor, Santa Barbara State Normal School of Manual Arts and Home Economics, from 1918. His administrative title was changed to provost in 1944 when the campus became a part of the University of California. He retired from the position in 1946.

He was educated from Stanford University, where he received his A.B. and M.A. degrees.
