= Columbia Chorale =

American choir based in Columbia, Missouri

Columbia Chorale is an American choir based in Columbia, Missouri. It is a 60 plus men and women's mixed voice classical community choir that performs six or more concerts per season. It is sometimes in partnership and often shares talent with the University of Missouri School of Music.

== Concerts ==
Columbia Chorale partners with the Columbia Civic Orchestra] the 9th St. Philharmonic Orchestra], and professional guest soloists. Most concerts are performed at the Missouri United Methodist church Concert Series but the chorale also performs in Jesse Hall as part of the University of Missouri-Columbia Concert Series and at the Missouri Theater Center for the Arts.

Columbia Chorale has an annual Messiah Sing Along and on several occasions it has performed at the Cathedral of the Immaculate Conception in Kansas City and the Church of St. Mary the Virgin, Aldermanbury in Fulton, Missouri.

== History ==
Columbia Chorale was founded in June 1978 as the Ad Hoc Singers by Christine Leonard Cox. In September 1979, the organization split into two choral groups: the “Chorale Ensemble” of approximately 30 singers, and the “Ad Hoc Singers,” about 15 in number. In September 1981, the name of the organization officially changed to Columbia Chorale Ensembles, Inc. Ad Hoc Swingers, a local jazz ensemble, was added for one season.

The acting director, David Benz, consolidated the singers into one group, the Columbia Choral Ensemble, in January 1984. Dr. David Taylor was named director of the group later that year and served as director until August 1987 when Martin Hook became director. In 1989, Glenna Betts Johnson joined the group as accompanist. In January 1991 Dr. R. Paul Drummond became director and was succeeded by Fred Kaiser in 2002. In 2003, Alex Innecco became the director. In 2013 Emily Edgington-Andrews became the current director.

== See also ==
- Missouri Symphony, a professional symphony orchestra
