= Charles Henry Galloway =

American organist

- Galloway c. 1909
- Born: December 21, 1871; St. Louis, Missouri, U.S.
- Died: March 9, 1931 (aged 59); St. Louis, Missouri
- Occupations: Organist, music educator, choral conductor, composer
- Website: chgallowayorganist.com

Signature
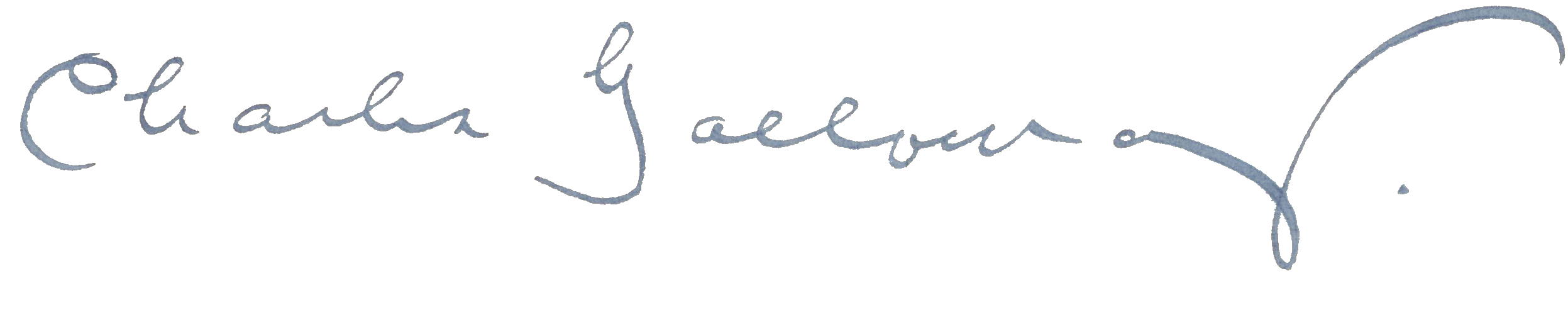

Charles Henry Galloway (December 21, 1871 – March 9, 1931) was a St. Louis, Missouri church and concert organist, choral conductor, educator, and composer.

At six feet eight inches (2.03 m) tall, Galloway was a large man with a commanding presence. His hands were so large, in fact, that his reach on the piano was supposedly twelve keys, or just over eleven inches. A child prodigy, Galloway was employed as a church organist by the age of nine. Over the course of his life, he was employed at various churches in St. Louis, including St. Peter's Episcopal Church, where he served as organist and choirmaster for more than thirty-five years. From 1895 to 1898, Galloway studied with the great French organist Alexandre Guilmant, with whom he became lifelong friends.

Most notably, Galloway was the official organist for the 1904 Louisiana Purchase Exposition in St. Louis, where he debuted the great organ in Festival Hall (now preserved as the nucleus of the Wanamaker Organ at Macy's Center City in Philadelphia) which was the largest organ in the world at that time. Though he composed numerous works as a young man, Galloway later admitted in a letter to W.H. Pommer, “I cannot believe that it was ever meant for Charles Galloway to compose.” He also served as the conductor of the most respected men's and women's choral ensembles in the St. Louis area: the Apollo Club of St. Louis and the Morning Choral Club, respectively. As an educator, Galloway taught at various institutions, including the Strassberger Conservatories of Music, Washington University in St. Louis, and Lindenwood University.)

== Biography ==
=== Early life ===
Galloway was born in St. Louis, Missouri on December 21, 1871, to William and Phoebe Galloway; he was the youngest of six children and their fourth son. Galloway's father was born in Ceres, a small village in the Kingdom of Fife, Scotland. Around 1850, William immigrated to the United States, settling in Keokuk, Iowa. There, he met Phoebe Lidbury, an English immigrant, and the two were married in 1858. They soon moved to St. Louis after William went bankrupt as a result of granting too much credit. It was likely at the suggestion of William's adopted brother Thomas, who was a partner in the stone yard of Vietch & Galloway. William found work in St. Louis as a dry goods salesman.

Throughout his childhood, Galloway and his family lived in their house on Goode Avenue. William eventually sold the house to Annie Malone, the African-American businesswoman and philanthropist, who founded an orphanage there; after Malone died, the street was renamed Annie Malone Drive.

As a boy, Galloway attended public school before he was enrolled at the Smith Academy—a private boys' school affiliated with Washington University. His musical training began at a very young age. One of his earliest instructors was William Robyn (the organist, conductor and father of Alfred G. Robyn) who Gerald Bordman regards as “one of the most distinguished pioneers of serious music in the American West.”

=== Study in Paris ===
Galloway first met Alexandre Guilmant in September 1893, when the French virtuoso was touring North America. Guilmant, widely regarded as the greatest organist in the world at that time, gave two recitals at the Grand Avenue Presbyterian Church in St. Louis; Galloway happened to be accompanying other performers on the programs. Two years later, on April 17, 1895, he departed for France to study organ and theory with Guilmant, who was soon after appointed Professor of Organ at the Paris Conservatory. Galloway spent nearly four years in France, during which time he was employed as the organist of the American Church of the Holy Trinity—one of the oldest English-speaking churches in Paris—and became lifelong friends with Louis Vierne, Marcel Dupré, and other notable French organists.

Galloway was also reportedly the only student Guilmant ever asked to perform with him in concert at the Trocadéro. According to an article published in the St. Louis Post-Dispatch, “[Galloway's] playing was received with enthusiasm, and he was encored three times by an audience numbering between 4000 and 5000.” The young organist even received praise from Guilmant himself; following his return to the United States on December 28, 1898, Guilmant wrote in a letter: “For several years I have given organ and theory lessons to Mr. Charles Galloway, and I have taken the greatest interest in his studies, which have been excellent. He is now an artist of the first rank, destined to have a great and legitimate success. His execution on the organ is imposing and brilliant. I am very happy to give him this testimonial of esteem and affection.” Guilmant later dedicated his Organ Sonata No. 7 to Galloway.

=== Church organist ===
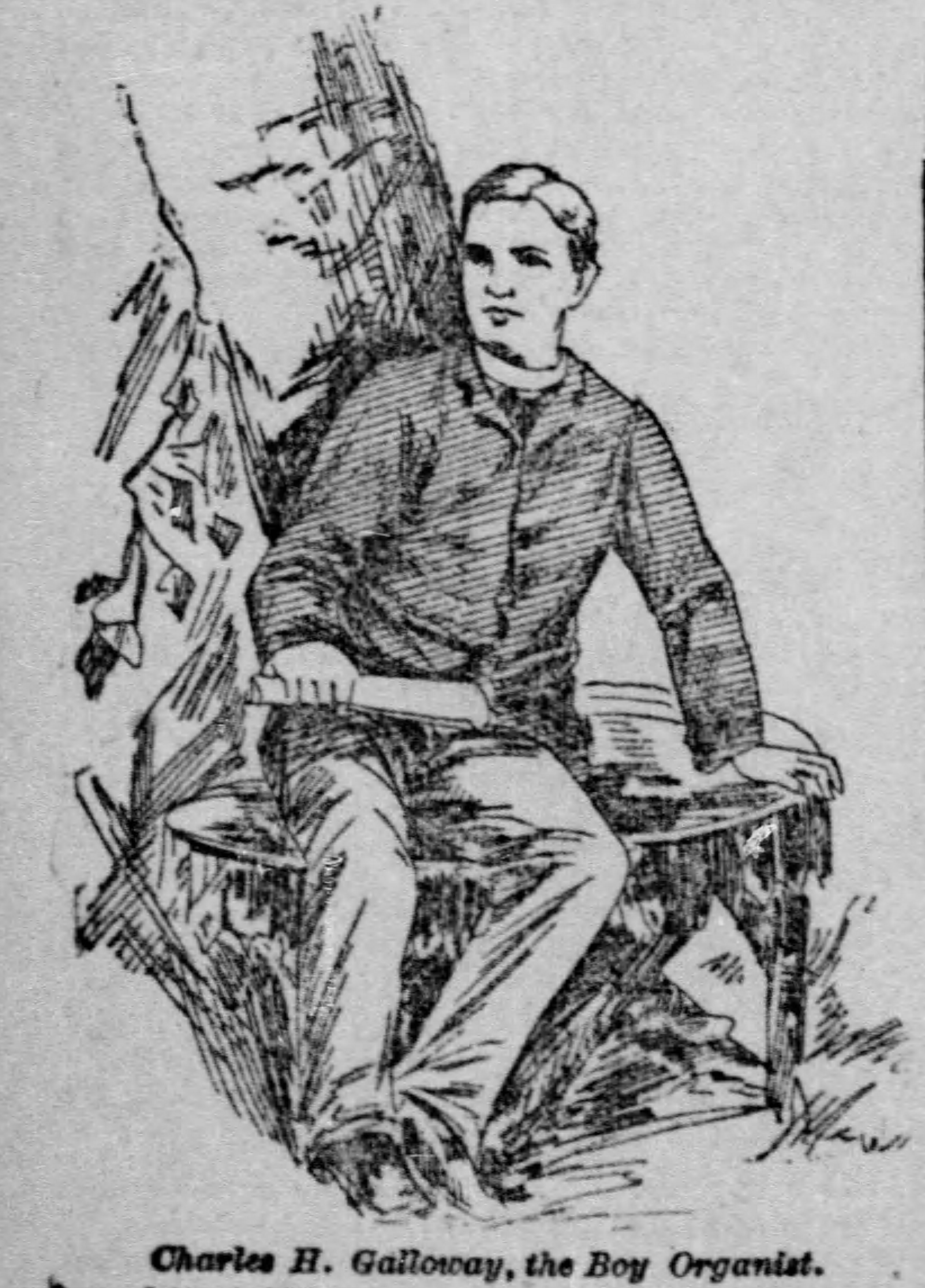
Drawing of Charles Galloway, the "boy organist," published in the St. Louis Post-Dispatch, July 15, 1888.

When he was just nine years old, Galloway began his career as a church musician at the Goode Avenue Presbyterian Church, where he accompanied the choir on melodion—although some accounts claim he was as young as seven. Due to his young age, Galloway was affectionately known as the “boy organist” for many years. In 1883, he was hired by St. Peter's Episcopal Church, where he played on his first pipe organ. Four years later, he left St. Peter's and was engaged at various churches throughout St. Louis, including Pilgrim Congregational Church, the Temple Israel, St. George's Episcopal, and the First Presbyterian Church. He was later rehired as organist and choirmaster at St. Peter's Episcopal Church, where he remained until his death.

=== Personal life ===
Galloway married Garfielda S.E. Miller (Fil) on June 1, 1905. Fil was born in St. Louis herself, but her parents were German immigrants. Her father, Herman, was a brewer (though no relation to the Miller Brewing Company) and named his daughter after President James A. Garfield, of whom he was a great admirer. Between 1905 and 1906, the newlyweds spent several months in Europe for their honeymoon, which also allowed Galloway to finish his organ studies in Paris. Following their return to the United States, their first child, Dorothy Miller, was born in July 1906. Charles and Fil bought their first house in 1907, prior to which they had lived with Charles's mother, brothers William and George, and William's wife Ellen. About a year later, they moved again to their house on Halliday Avenue, where they would remain for nearly a decade. Their second child was born in October 1910, and less than two years later, in July 1912, they welcomed another son,

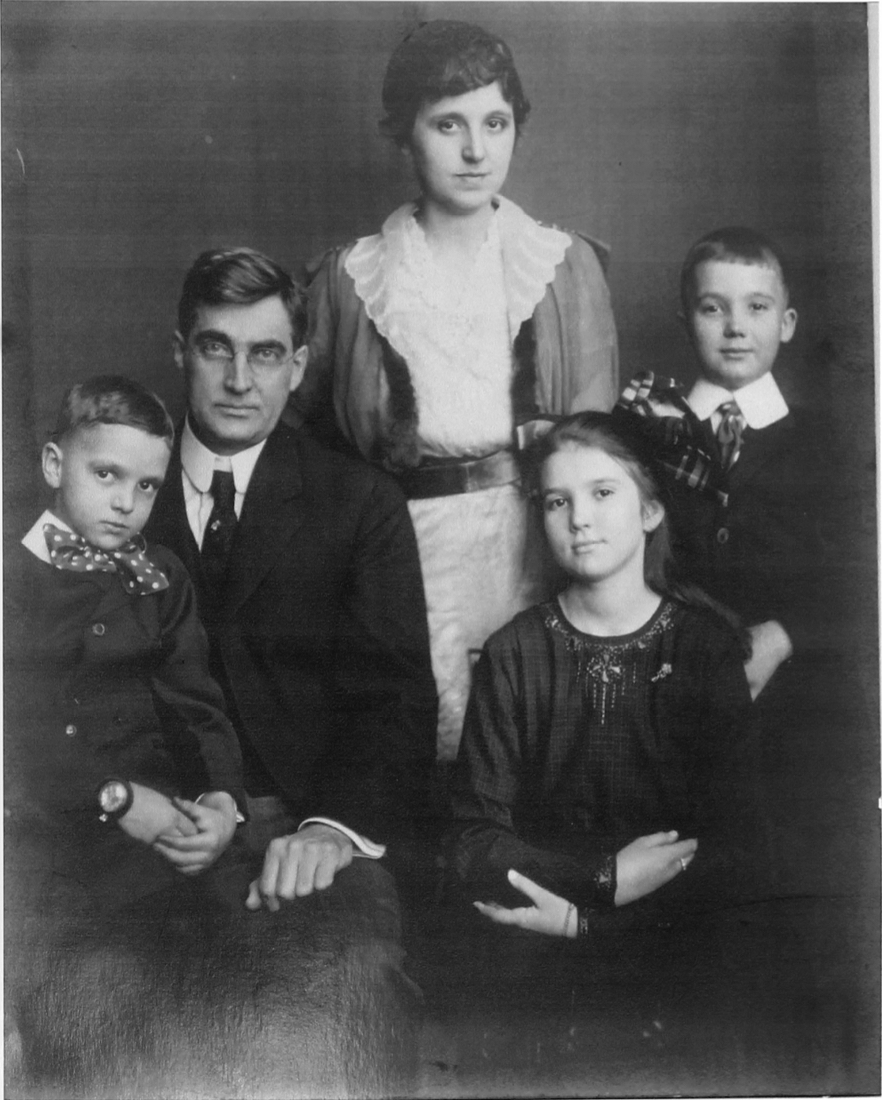
Portrait of the Galloway family, 1918. From left to right: Edward, Charles, Garfielda, Dorothy, and Charles Miller.

Sometime before World War I, the Galloways purchased a large Victorian house across from Tower Grove Park on Magnolia Avenue from Jacob Stockey, who had built the house himself in 1906 and lived next door. Garfielda had a terrible fear of natural gas, so she had all of the gas lines removed when the family moved in. For several decades following, the house was entirely electric. In his home studio, Galloway had two grand pianos and, in the 1920s, a pipe organ as well. On Sunday afternoons during the summer months, with the windows open, he would give informal concerts, and dozens of people would gather across the street in Tower Grove Park to listen.

=== 1904 World’s Fair ===
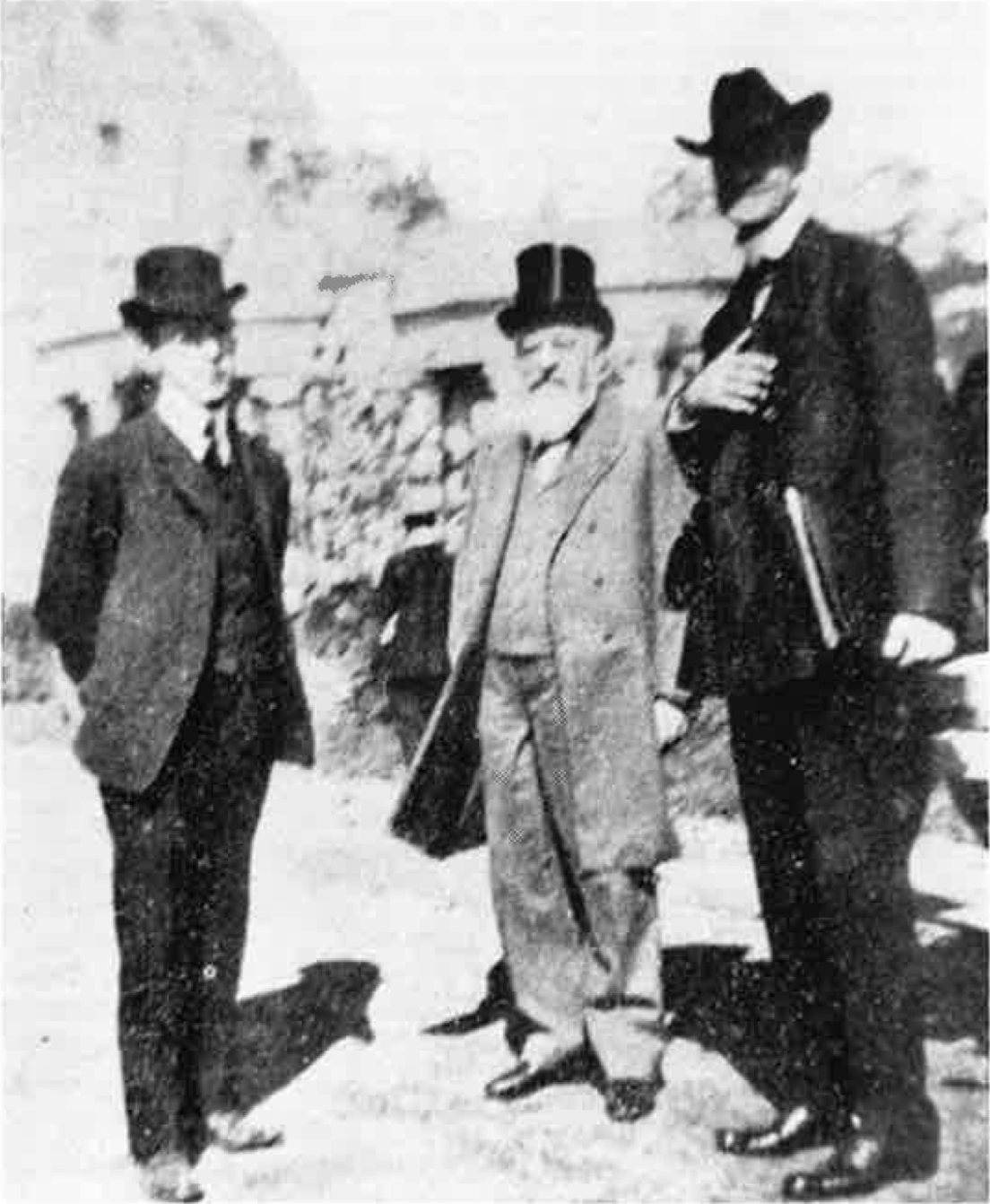
Photograph of Charles Galloway (right) with organists Mason Slade (left) and Alexandre Guilmant (center) at the 1904 World's Fair.

As a performer, Galloway's greatest recognition came from serving as the official organist of the 1904 Louisiana Purchase Exposition in St. Louis when he was just thirty-two years old. The World's Fair Bureau of Music commissioned the Murray M. Harris Organ Company (later the Los Angeles Art Organ Company) to construct the largest organ ever built. Galloway traveled to California to see the organ as it was constructed. Although it is unknown what role he played in its design, it was likely a significant one, as Galloway was a noted organ designer for the Kilgen Organ Company of St. Louis. The sheer size of the great organ was truly unprecedented. Its console had five manuals, each with sixty-one keys; one hundred forty stops; and more than 10,000 pipes, the lowest of which was thirty-two feet long, and, as World's Fair Secretary David R. Francis notes, large enough for a pony to pass through them. It required ten railroad cars to transport the organ from Los Angeles to St. Louis. In his official history of the fair, John Wesley Hanson writes, “It is an instrument capable of producing 17,179,869,183 distinct tonal effects, a continuous performance that would last 32,600 years if a different one of these combinations were drawn every minute.” The organ's debut was scheduled for May 1, the opening day of the fair, but, unsurprisingly, there were several complications, and Galloway did not give his opening recital until June 9.

As the official organist, Galloway gave numerous concerts over the course of the World's Fair, both as a soloist and in conjunction with various ensembles, including the Exposition Symphony Orchestra, conducted by Alfred Ernst, and the Exposition Chorus, which had nearly 2800 members. In addition, daily organ recitals were given by more than eighty of the most respected organists from around the world, including J. Warren Andrews, Horatio Parker, and, most notably, Alexandre Guilmant. Over the course of his six weeks at the fair, Guilmant was engaged to give a total of thirty-six recitals. Due to their popularity, however, he gave three additional recitals his final week as well as a French historical music recital. All of Guilmant's forty recitals were performed from memory.

=== High demand as an organist ===
Galloway's position as the official organist of the Louisiana Purchase Exposition put him in high demand as a performer. Soon after the fair, he briefly served as the organist of the Scottish Rite Cathedral. He was also hired as the official organist of the Choral Symphony Society and, in 1906, Washington University. For many years, Galloway gave a series of eight monthly organ recitals in Graham Chapel on the university's campus, which were free to the public. In addition, over the course of his career, he gave countless recitals across the United States and dedicated dozens of organs, which earned him a national reputation.

In 1924, Galloway was asked to perform at the wedding of Cornelia Vanderbilt, great-granddaughter of Cornelius Vanderbilt. He was taken by train from St. Louis directly to the Biltmore Estate in North Carolina. Interestingly, Cornelia's parents, George Washington Vanderbilt II and Edith Dresser, were married at the American Church of the Holy Trinity in Paris during Galloway's tenure there in 1898.

=== Musical involvement ===
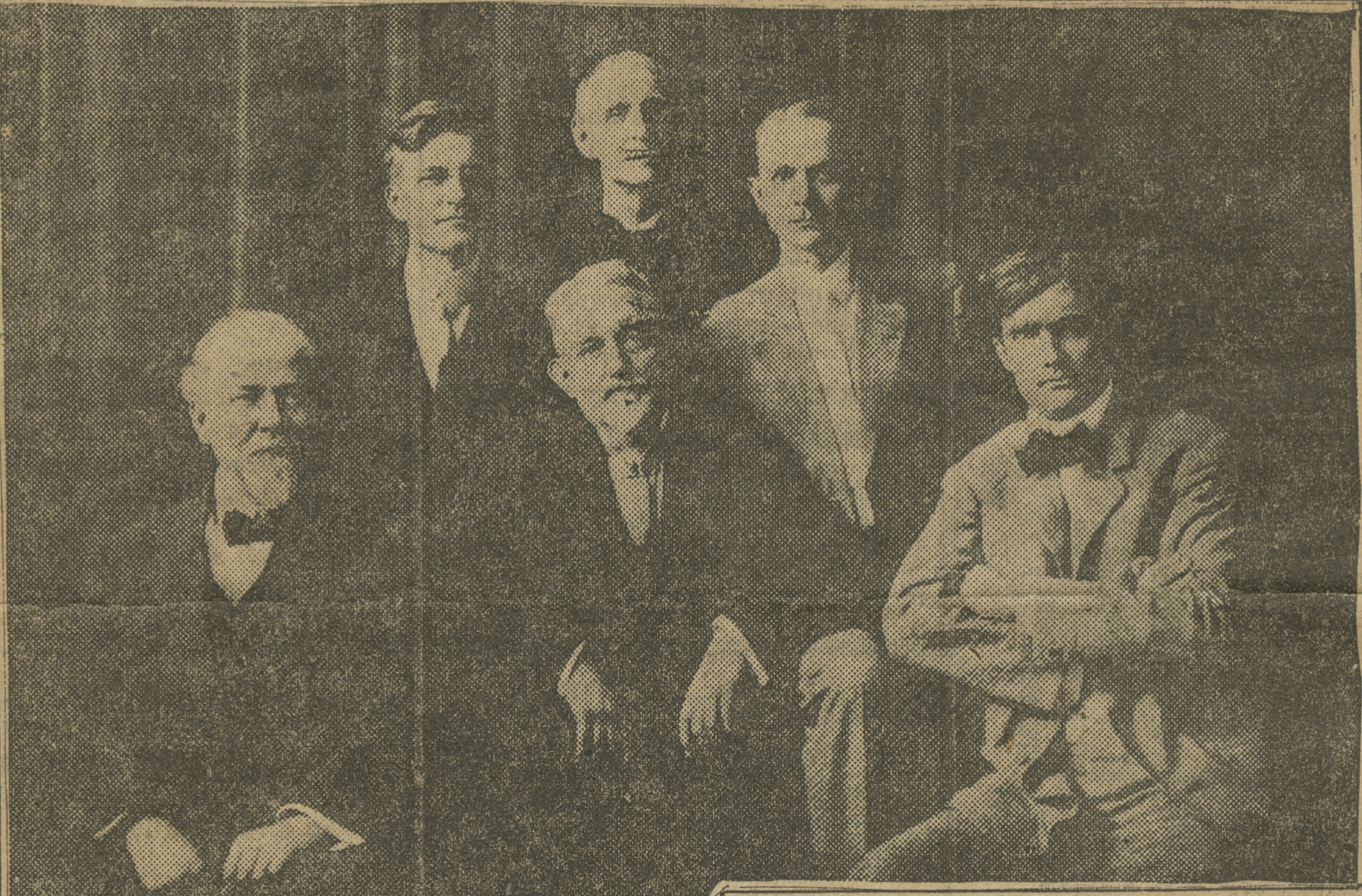
The members of the Missouri State Song Committee, including Charles Galloway (right), 1910.

Outside of his performances, Galloway was quite involved with various St. Louis musicians and organizations. When Governor Herbert S. Hadley established the Missouri State Song Committee in 1910, Chairman W.H. Pommer quickly selected Galloway as one of the members. Over the following two years, Pommer and Galloway, along with Frederick W. Mueller; William Schuyler; Carl Busch, director of the Kansas City Symphony; and D.R. Gebhart, Professor of Music at First District Normal School conducted the State Song Competition. They sifted through thousands of submissions before making their final decision in 1912. A single winner was never declared, however; the committee selected the poem “Missouri” by Lizzie Chambers Hull for the song's text and awarded four different composers honorable mention prizes for their settings of it.

A year earlier, Galloway, along with Ernest R. Kroeger and James T. Quarles, chartered the St. Louis chapter of the American Guild of Organists. In October 1921, he served as the Director of Music for the Missouri Centennial Celebration. Galloway also held positions in various musical organizations throughout his later life. He served as a member of the Board of Governors of the St. Louis Art League, the advisory board of the Community Music Schools Foundation, and the Committee on Conductors of the St. Louis Symphony Society.

=== Conductor ===
Throughout his career, Galloway conducted numerous choral ensembles. He was hired as the conductor of the Apollo Club of St. Louis—the city's premier men's chorus—in 1902, succeeding the founding director, Alfred G. Robyn. During his time in Europe, Galloway's position was filled by composer Arthur Lieber. In 1908, he became the conductor of Morning Choral Club, the premier women's chorus, succeeding Alfred Ernst. Galloway conducted both ensembles (which eventually combined to form the Apollo-Morning Choral Club in 1928) until his death. In addition, he served as the conductor of the Washington University Chapel Choir for various years beginning in 1910. He was, in fact, conducting the ensemble when he died in 1931. Galloway's obituary in The Diapason notes the dramatic circumstances of his death:

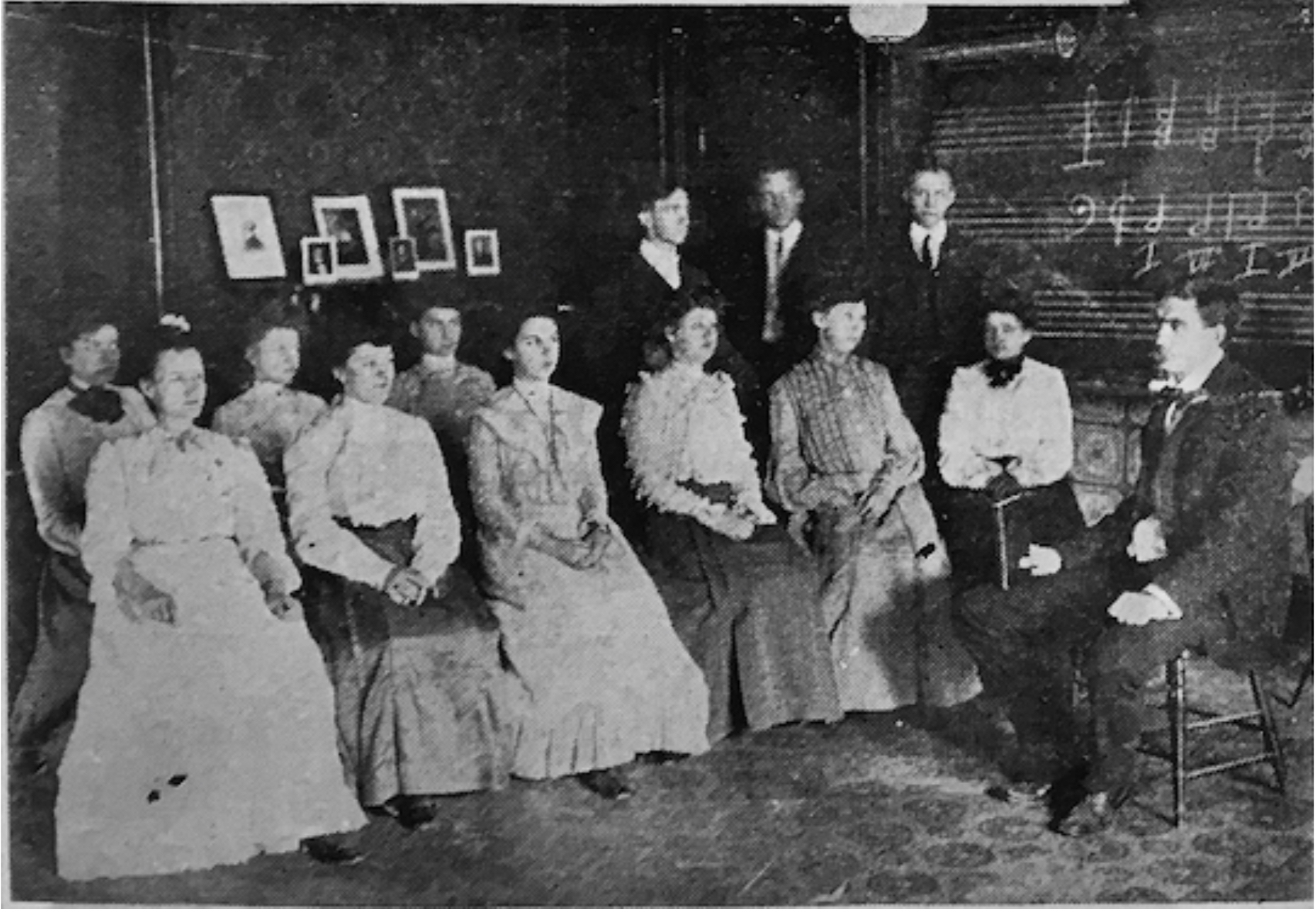
Theory class led by Galloway at the Strassberger Conservatories of Music.

In the late afternoon, Mr. Galloway was conducting a rehearsal in the Washington University field-house, by the combined glee clubs of the university and the chapel choir, assisted by the St. Louis Symphony Orchestra, of Fletcher's “A Song of Victory,” when in leaving the rostrum he was suddenly stricken with an attack of heart disease to which he succumbed within an hour. His 'song of victory' had been sung and he quietly slipped away to receive the plaudits of those who had preceded him in the realms beyond.

=== Educator ===
Unsurprisingly, Galloway's reputation as an organist put him in high demand as an instructor. Over the course of his teaching career, he gave keyboard lessons to a great number of students and even gave some voice instruction. In addition to those in his private studio, Galloway taught at various institutions, including the Strassberger Conservatories of Music and, briefly, Lindenwood College. He was hired by Clemens Strassberger in 1902 to teach organ and piano as well as several music theory courses, such as harmony, composition, and counterpoint. From 1906 until his death, Galloway served as the chairman of the conservatory's Examination Board.

== List of students ==
This is an incomplete list.

- Allan Henry Bacon
- Amy Upham Wood Bagg
- Lucien E. Becker
- Walter E. Buszin
- Katherine N. Carmichael
- George Cibulka
- Herbert Cohn
- Mamie Ericson Dufford
- Edward J. Dunstedter
- Stella Price Einstein
- Paul Freiss
- Hugo Hagen
- Rose Marie Hallam
- Millard Halter
- Mrs. Philip B. Hopkins
- Rachel Jerauld
- Hunter Jones
- Oliver Henry Kleinschmidt
- Lucy Dimmitt Kolp
- Edna Bell Lieber
- Caroline May Lowe
- Con Maffie
- Williard McGregor
- Edward E. Menges
- John Menown
- Garfielda Miller
- Leo C. Miller
- Walter D. Parker
- James Thomas Quarles
- O. Rauschelbach
- Edward Rechlin
- William T. Rushing
- Kate D. Sanborn
- Ernest Prang Stamm
- Adolph Steuterman
- Harry E. Von Tobel
- Henry Stanley Walser
- Nesta Williams
- Walter Paul Wismar

== Compositions ==
This is an incomplete list.

- "Skating Rink March" for solo piano, dedicated to Mrs. T.C. Hamilton (1885)
- "Myra Gavotte," dedicated to Jordan Wheat Lambert (1888)
- "Oh Be Joyful in the Lord," op. 33 for SATB chorus and piano, dedicated to Mrs. Charles R. Blake (1888)
- "My Love Song" for voice and piano, dedicated to Julia Hobart (1898)
- "Gretna Green" for piano duet, dedicated to Richard J. Compton (1899)
- "My Own" for voice and piano, dedicated to Julia West Hadley (1900)
- "O, Mother Dear Jerusalem" for voice and piano, dedicated to Adelaide Kalkmann (1900)
- "Consolation" for voice and piano, dedicated to Mrs. Walter Atkinson (1905)
- "Our Shepherd Leads Us" for SATB chorus and piano

== Published articles ==
- "Organ and Organ Music in St. Louis," Kunkel's Musical Review, December 1899
- "Why You Can’t Hear the Biggest Organ in the World," St. Louis Post-Dispatch, June 26, 1904
- "Alexandre Guilmant as a Teacher," The Etude, January 1921
- "The Theory of Music as a Prerequisite Study for Any Seriously-Inclined Organ Student," The Etude, January 1921
- "Transcriptions for the Organ," The Etude, January 1921
- "Music in Our Churches," The Etude, August 1925
