= William Pommer =

William Pommer may refer to:

- William Henry Pommer, American composer
- William Albert Pommer, member of the House of Commons of Canada
