= Esterházy (disambiguation) =

Esterházy is a Hungarian surname.

Esterházy may also refer to:

- House of Esterházy, a Hungarian noble family
- Esterhazy, Saskatchewan, a town in Canada
- Schloss Esterházy, a palace in Eisenstadt, Austria
- Palais Esterházy, a baroque palace in Vienna, Austria
- Esterházy torte, a Hungarian cake named after a member of the Esterházy dynasty

== See also ==
- Esterhazy Quartet, a string quartet
- Ferdinand Walsin Esterhazy, French army officer
