= John Cheetham =

John Cheetham may refer to:

- John Cheetham (composer), American composer
- John Cheetham (cricketer), cricket player
- John Cheetham (manufacturer), English cotton manufacturer
