= University of Missouri School of Music =

School of Music within the University of Missouri in Columbia, Missouri

Coordinates: 38°56′48.31″N 92°19′30.85″W

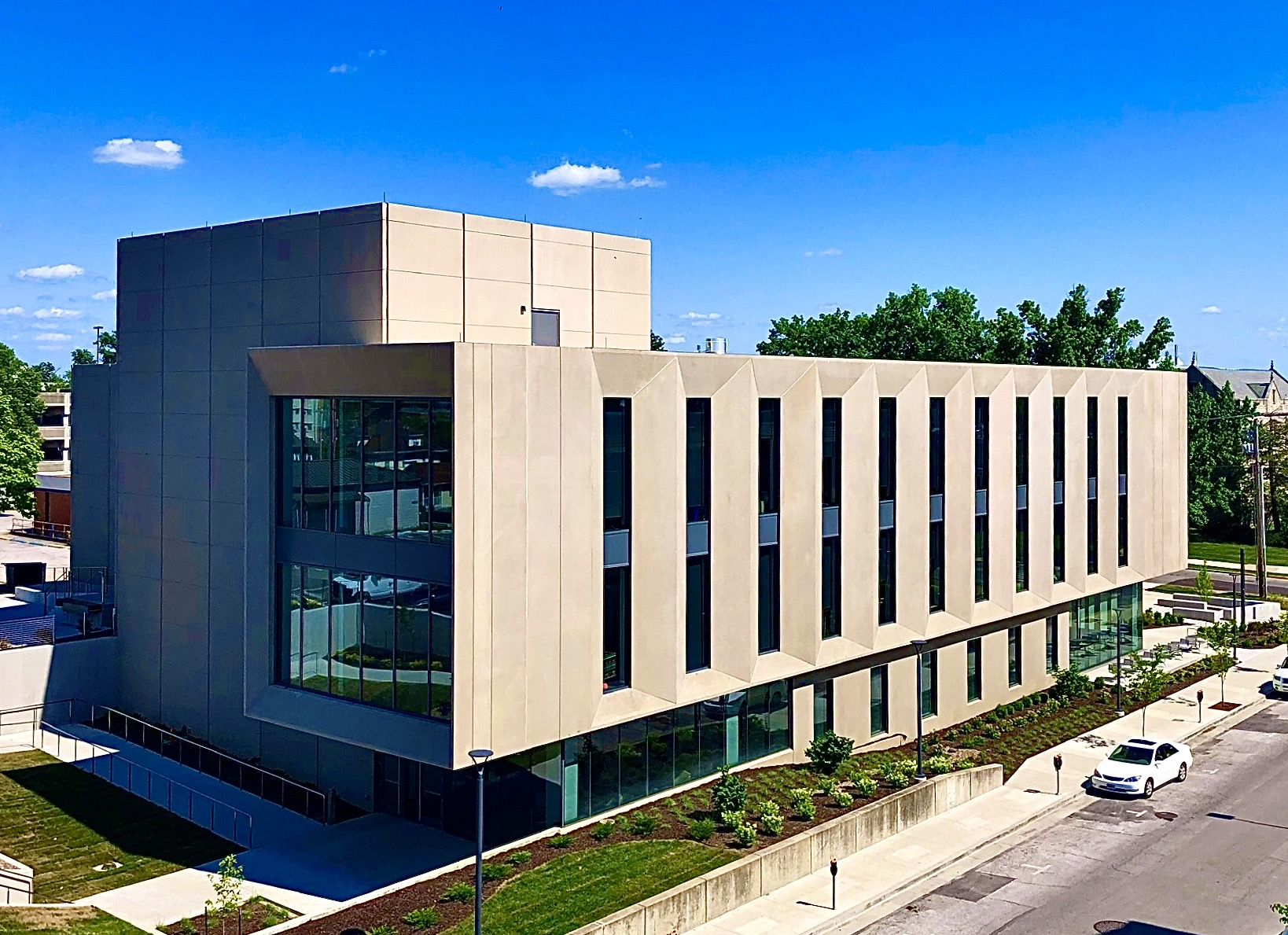
- The Sinquefield Music Center
- Former name: Department of Music
- Type: Public
- Established: 1917; 109 years ago
- Parent institution: University of Missouri
- Academic affiliations: National Association of Schools of Music
- Director: Jared Rawlings
- Faculty: 36 faculty 14 adjunct faculty
- Administrative staff: 9 staff
- Location: Columbia, Missouri, United States
- Campus: Urban, college town
- Marching band: Marching Mizzou
- Colors: Black and MU Gold
- Website: music.missouri.edu

The School of Music is an academic division of the University of Missouri in Columbia, Missouri. Its focus is the study of music, awarding baccalaureate, master's, and doctoral degrees as part of the College of Arts and Science. The institution's programs encompass composition, performance, conducting, music education, music history, musical theatre and musicology. Established in 1917 as the Department of Music, the school continues to play a prominent role in the cultural life of Missouri and is located in the Sinquefield Music Center, on the university's flagship campus in Downtown Columbia. The Fine Arts Building also houses classrooms, studios, and a recital hall. Its major performance venues are Jesse Hall, the Missouri Theatre, and Whitmore Recital Hall. The Missouri Tigers marching band, Marching Mizzou, performs at Faurot Field for Southeastern Conference football games. The school's ensembles have performed worldwide and can be heard weekly on the university's own KMUC 90.5 FM Classical, Mid-Missouri's classical music radio station. Alumni include singers Sheryl Crow and Neal Boyd, Canadian Brass founder Gene Watts, and jazz artist Mike Metheny.

== History ==
=== Founding – 1960 ===
Music has accompanied life at the University of Missouri since the dedication of Academic Hall in 1843. Although of that first venue only The Columns remain, music itself has since become a serious topic of study at the university. Instruction as part of official curriculum began in 1885 with the founding of the Cadet Band at the suggestion of military science professor Enoch Crowder. That band, today known as Marching Mizzou, proved popular with both university students and the townspeople of Columbia. It was not until 1907 that University President Richard Jesse appointed William Pommer as the first instructor of music. That same year Pommer, along with German professor Hermann Almstedt and future University President Albert Ross Hill, formed the Zeta chapter of Phi Mu Alpha Sinfonia (ΦΜΑ). One of the earliest chapters of the fraternity, and the first at an institution without a school of music, Zeta played an instrumental role in the growth of the university's musical environment, especially the creation of a concert series which brought the likes of Vladimir de Pachmann, Percy Grainger, and the St. Louis Symphony to the campus. In 1910, the university became one of the earliest American universities to give credit for applied music lessons. The Department of Music as part of the College of Arts and Sciences was established in 1917, largely due to the efforts of Pommer, who would chair the department and continue to teach at the university until his retirement in 1922.

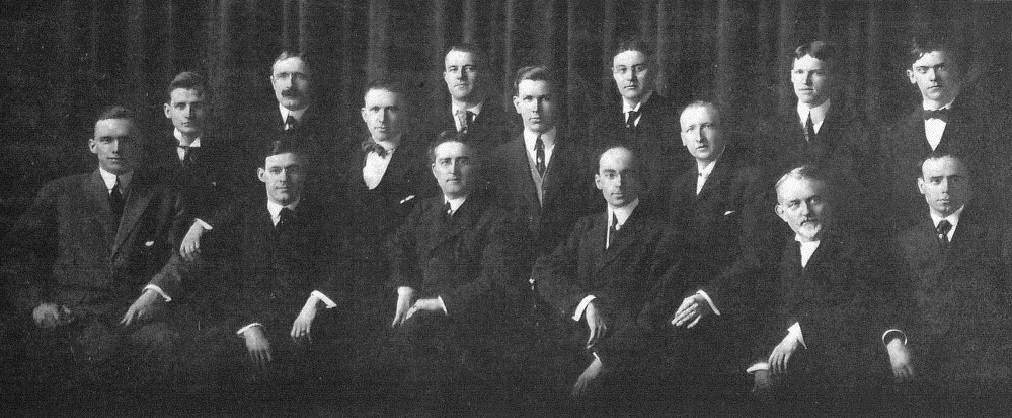
The 1908 Zeta Chapter of Phi Mu Alpha Sinfonia, including German professor, pianist, and glee club director Hermann Almstedt

Organist James Quarles was appointed the chair of the department in 1923. Previously head of Cornell University's Music Department, Quarles became Missouri's first Dean of the School of Fine Arts upon its establishment as the university's tenth division in 1924. He also compiled and edited a book of school songs. Other dramatic changes occurred in 1924 as the Department of Music found a new home in Lathrop Hall, a re-purposed dormitory near Francis Quadrangle, and the university assumed responsibility for the Phi Mu Alpha Concert Series which had become too popular for the fraternity to manage. At that time it was rechristened as the "University Concert Series;" the series continues as of 2021. Outside of the concert series, famous Columbia ragtime pianist Blind Boone attended rehearsal and performed for the Cadet Band. In 1933, the Department of Music became a member of the National Association of Schools of Music and in 1935 the University Concert Series hosted pianist Sergei Rachmaninoff in front of a crowd of thousands. The university's most exclusive choral ensemble, University Singers, was created in 1946 by choral director Paul Van Bodegraven. In 1941, as women became increasingly involved in the department, they established an international music fraternity, Sigma Alpha Iota. In 1954, pianist Bethune Bischooff became the first woman appointed to a full-time position. The band program was reorganized in 1956 and the Cadet Band became the football band; Professor Richard Hills named them "Marching Mizzou".

=== 1961–present ===
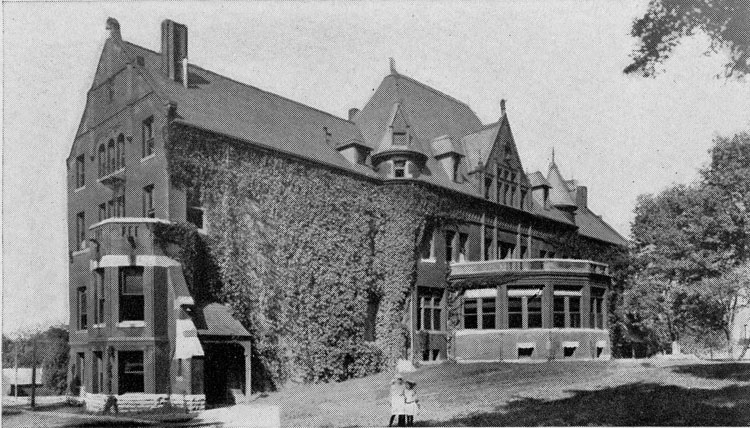
Lathrop Hall around 1905, prior to its usage by the Department of Music and subsequent demolition

Modernity arrived in 1961 with the completion the Fine Arts Building. Though panned by critics past and present for its design, "FAB" was the first University space designed specifically for music and included a modern recital hall. The first jazz ensemble sponsored by the department was the Studio Band, which formed in 1966. Composer Thomas McKenney began the process of establishing an electronic studio for composition in 1969. In 1975, composition professor John Cheetham introduced a music appreciation course entitled "Jazz, Pop & Rock." This course, popular with music majors and non-majors alike, would become the most popular ever offered by the school. Apart from the budding study of music history, composition, and jazz, faculty members established the Esterhazy String Quartet in 1968. The quartet's tours of South America, beginning in 1976, drew international students to the university.

The School of Music's ensembles continued to tour widely over the next decades and august musical guests visited campus. Marching Mizzou and the University Singers represented Missouri during the United States bicentennial year; the University Singers performed at the Kennedy Center as part of the celebration. A Contemporary Music Competition began in 1977 in collaboration with radio station KBIA. Its brief existence included visits to the university by judges Vincent Persichetti, Lukas Foss, and Aaron Copland. Copland conducted the University Philharmonic and narrated his orchestral work Lincoln Portrait. In 1984, Robert Shaw conducted the University Singers and the Atlanta Symphony Orchestra in Beethoven's 9th Symphony. The next year, Virgil Thomson premiered two compositions on campus as part of a symposium and series of concerts in Shaw's honor. Marching Mizzou, after touring England in the 1970s, performed for the all-Missouri 1985 World Series. In 1987, Philip Glass and his ensemble performed their soundtrack to the film Koyaanisqatsi as part of the University Concert Series.

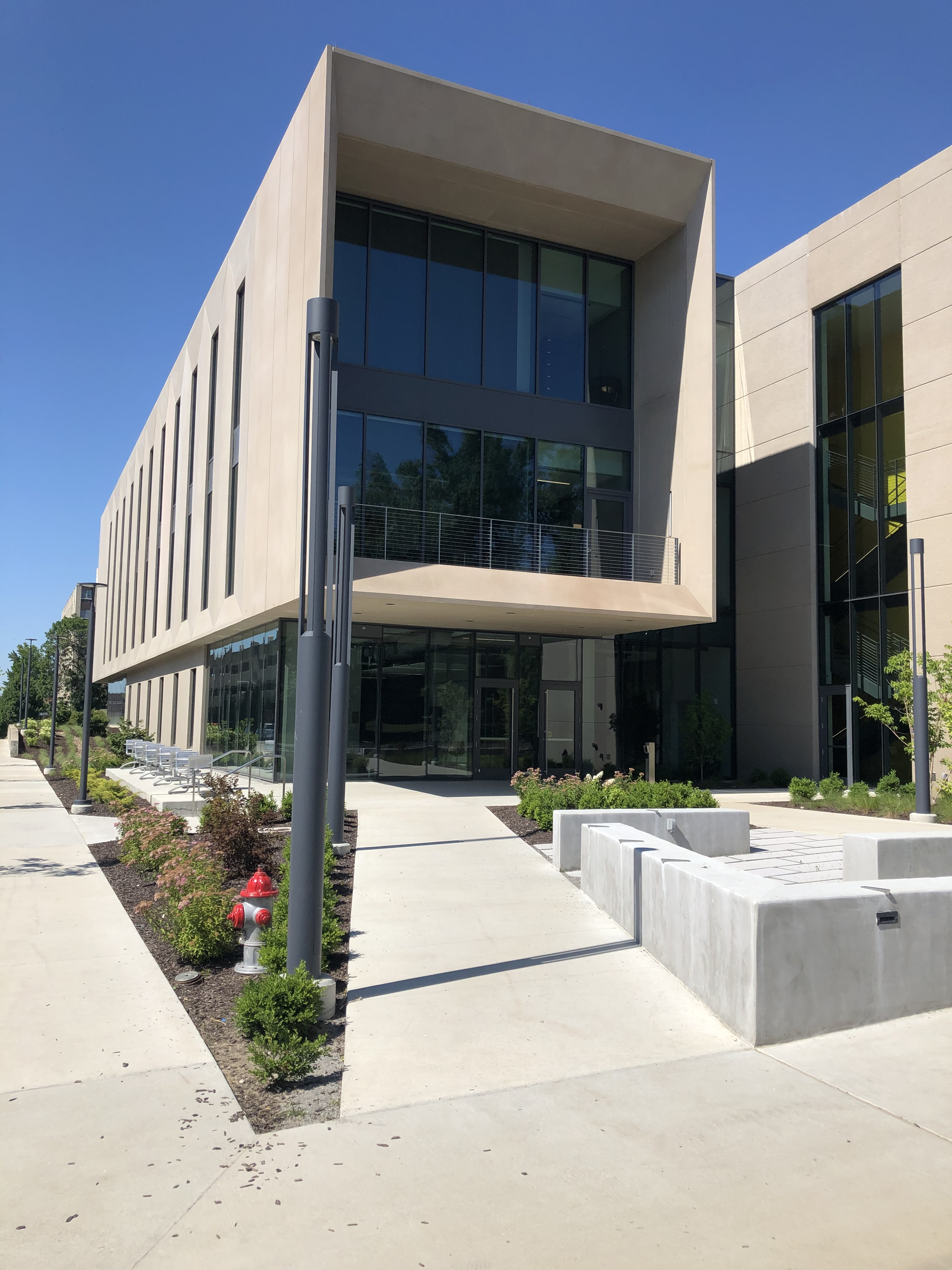
The Sinquefield Music Center at corner of Hitt Street and University Avenue opened in 2020.

Beginning in 1988, the Zeta Chapter of Phi Mu Alpha Sinfonia sponsored an annual jazz festival, drawing high school bands from across Missouri. The concert series brought the Modern Jazz Quartet to campus in 1988. By 1994 the department found itself in need of more space and a former Unitarian church adjacent to campus was acquired and dubbed the Fine Arts Annex. In 1995, the University Singers again performed at the Kennedy Center and in 2000, the Symphonic Wind Ensemble toured Australia and performed in the Sydney Opera House. The growing reputation of the department led to University of Missouri System President, Manuel T. Pacheco, to rechristen the Department of Music as the School of Music in the year 2000. Robert Shay would lead the School as Director from 2008 until 2014, when the school saw the appointment of its first female director, longtime percussion professor Julia Gaines, who still holds the position as of 2020. Also in 2014, the university announced the purchase of radio station 90.5 KWWC from Stephens College; the station was rebranded KMUC 90.5 FM Classical, and runs the weekly program Mizzou Music, featuring interviews and performances by faculty and students of the School of Music.

Growth came with a downside, by the new millennium, the school was spread across five buildings. Plans for new facilities had been proposed since the 1970s, but real progress was made in 2015, when Rex and Jeanne Sinquefield donated ten million dollars, the largest ever gift to the University of Missouri in support of the arts, to construct the Sinquefield Music Center. In 2018, the Fine Arts Annex was demolished for construction of the new building. On April 8, 2018, ground was broken for a new School of Music Building, which includes new large ensemble rehearsal spaces, a recording studio, faculty offices and practice rooms. The Sinquefield Music Center held its grand opening on February 1, 2020. There are unfunded plans for a four-story second phase, including a new concert hall and additional program space.

== Academics ==
The School of Music awards two types of undergraduate degrees: Bachelor of Music and Bachelor of Arts. As of 2020, the Bachelor of Music degree is divided into nine focus areas: Composition, Music Education, Music History, Music Theory, Brass Performance, Piano Performance, String Performance, Voice Performance, Woodwind Performance and Percussion Performance. The Bachelor of Arts degree is intended largely for students double majoring outside music. A Minor in Music Theater is offered as an interdisciplinary minor in cooperation with the Department of Theater.

Masters and Doctoral degrees are awarded in collaboration with the University of Missouri Graduate School. The Master of Music degree is divided into fifteen different focus areas: Brass, Choral Conducting, Collaborative Piano, Composition, Jazz Performance and Pedagogy, Music Education, Music Theory, Orchestral Conducting, Percussion, Piano Pedagogy, Piano Performance, Strings, Voice, Wind Conducting, and Woodwinds. A Master of Arts degree is offered in musicology. A PhD degree in Music Education is also offered.

=== Admission ===
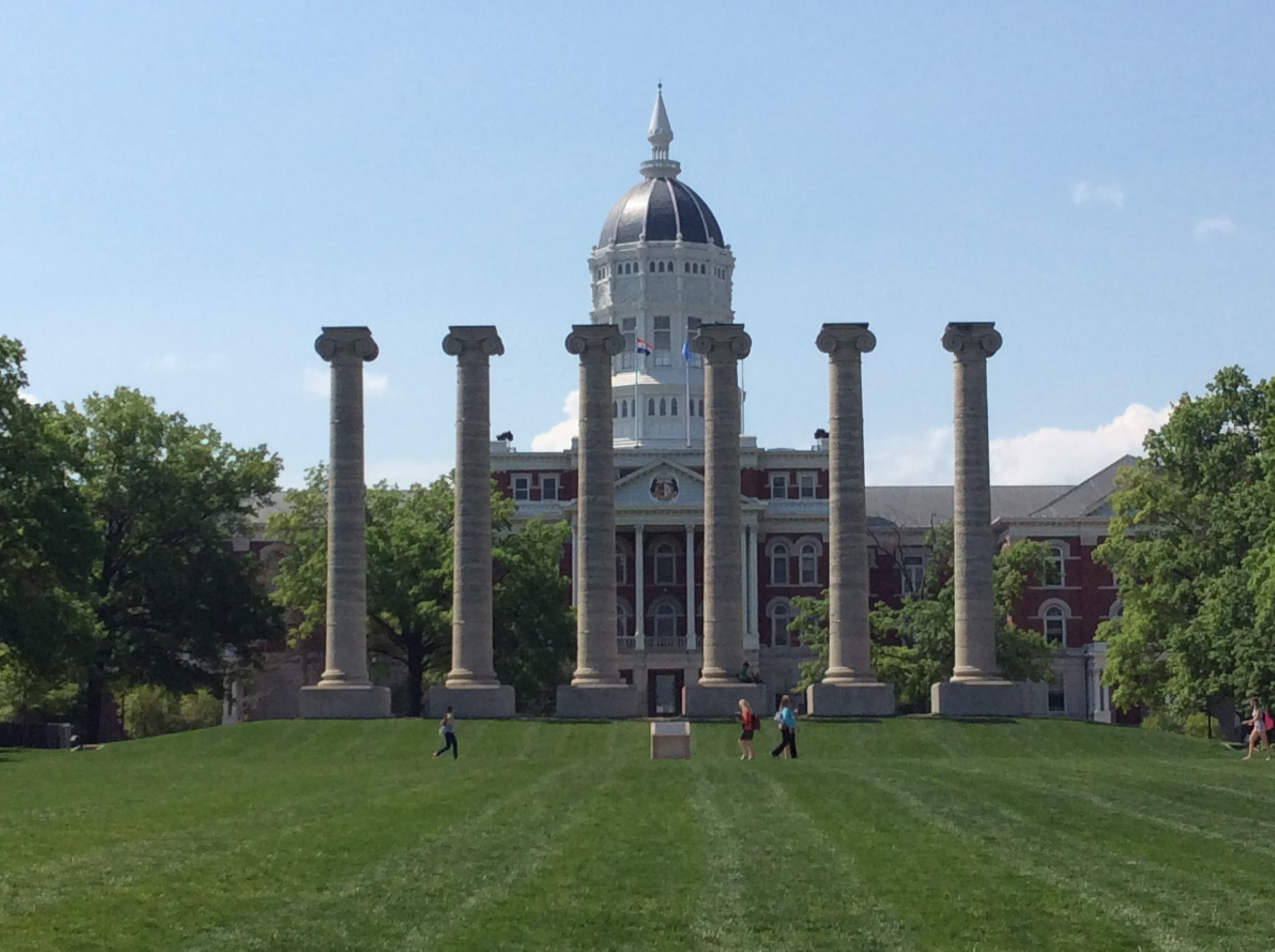
Jesse Hall is the university's largest indoor venue

As well as meeting the general requirements for admission to the University of Missouri, undergraduate students must audition on their primary instrument. As of 2019, auditions are held three times a year during Mizzou Music Days. Occasionally auditions can be scheduled at the discretion of individual instructors. Several scholarships are offered. Graduate applicants must hold a baccalaureate degree in music, or equivalent from an accredited institution. They also must have a GPA of 3.0 or higher in the last sixty hours of undergraduate coursework. Additional requirements vary by field.

=== International programs ===
The School of Music has partnerships with four Brazilian institutions and a conservatory of music in Avellino, Italy. The partnerships encourage student and faculty exchanges and collaboration in performance, teaching, and research. The first of these began with a tour of Brazil, and performance in the city of Belém by professors Eva Szekely, John McLeod, Carolyn Kenneson and Carleton Spotts; this led to the partnership with the Brazilian Fundação Carlos Gomes and continued with the State University of Londrina in 1998. An exchange program was begun in 2007 with the Theatro da Paz in Belém, Pará, home of the Pará Symphony Orchestra. More recently an agreement was formalized with Italian Conservatory Domenico Cimarosa in Avellino. The newest partnership is with the Federal University of Amazonas.

=== New Music Initiative ===
The philanthropy of Rex and Jeanne Sinquefield greatly encouraged the study of composition by establishing the Mizzou New Music Initiative, which includes the Sinquefield Composition Prize, the Creating Original Music Project (COMP) Festival, the Mizzou Summer Composition Institute, and the New Music Ensemble. The school also host the Mizzou International Composers Festival. In 2019, the Mizzou New Music Initiative announced a 2.5 million gift from the Sinquefields to go towards undergraduate scholarships and graduate assistants. The Mizzou Music Initiative has encouraged the creation of new music and composers such as Stephanie Berg who has seen her work performed by the St. Louis Symphony.

=== Budds Center ===
The Budds Center for American Music Studies was established in 2019 by musicologist, and faculty member, Michael J. Budds, with a 4 million dollar donation. The Center focuses on the study and preservation of American music. Budds was inducted into the Missouri Music Hall of Fame in 2009.

== Facilities ==
The Sinquefield Music Center, opened in 2020, houses faculty offices, classrooms, two large ensemble rehearsal spaces, a recording studio, many small rehearsal rooms. Across the street, the Fine Arts Building on Lowry Mall houses more faculty offices, classrooms, Whitmore Recital Hall, and Rhynsburger Theater.

Two large performance venues, Jesse Hall and the Missouri Theatre, are owned by the university and utilized for large ensembles and productions. Choral and chamber groups also often perform in the sanctuary of First Baptist Church, primarily for its favorable acoustics. Whitmore Recital Hall in the Fine Arts Building host student, faculty, and guest recitals. The Missouri United Methodist Church, whose large Skinner pipe organ was acquired by former school Dean James Quarles, is occasionally utilized. Jazz Ensembles and special events often make use of Stotler Lounge in the Memorial Union. Marching Mizzou has a dedicated practice field and storage facilities near Faurot Field, where it performs.

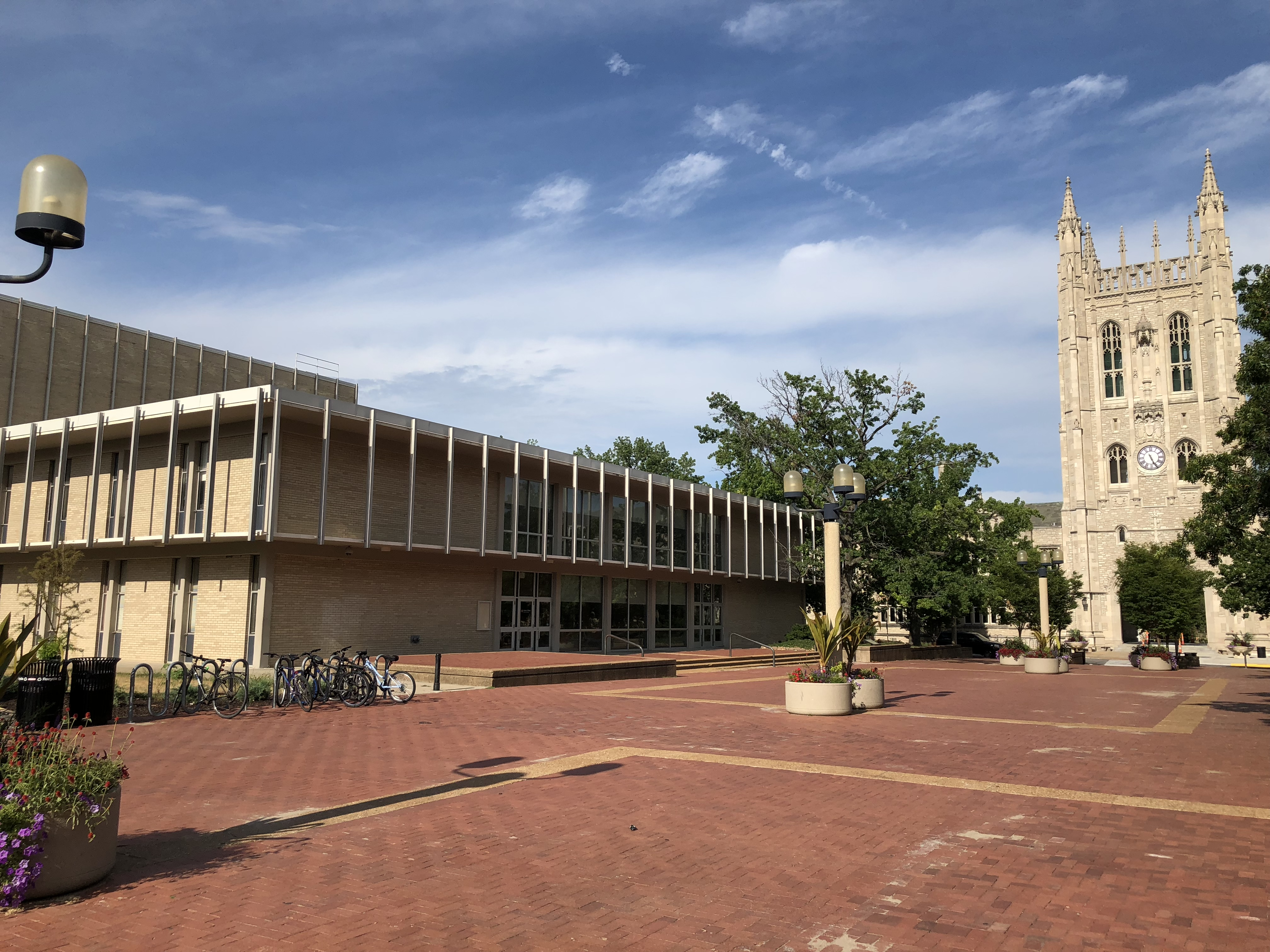
The Fine Arts Building and Memorial Union

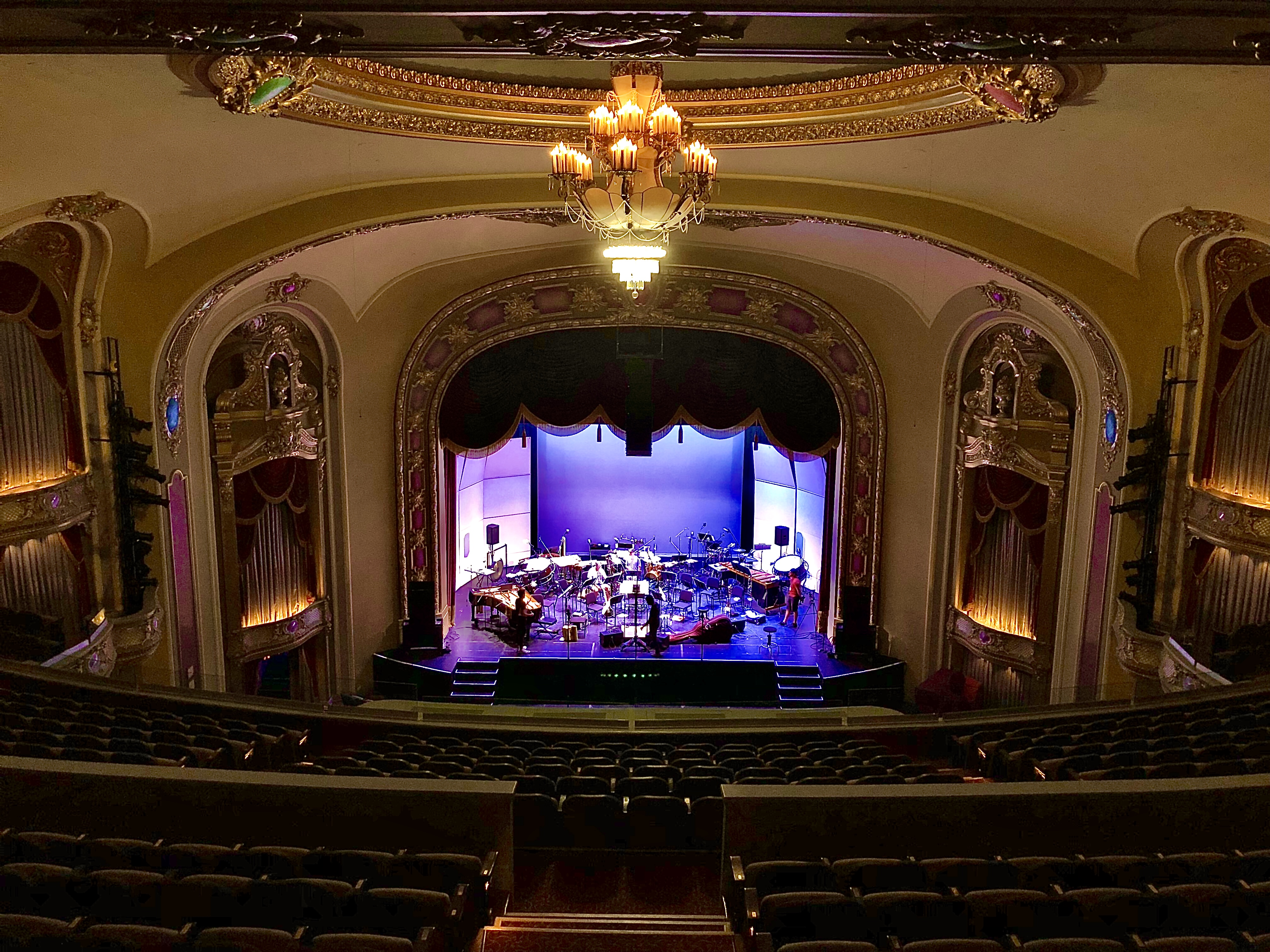
The Missouri Theatre set up for a performance of Alarm Will Sound

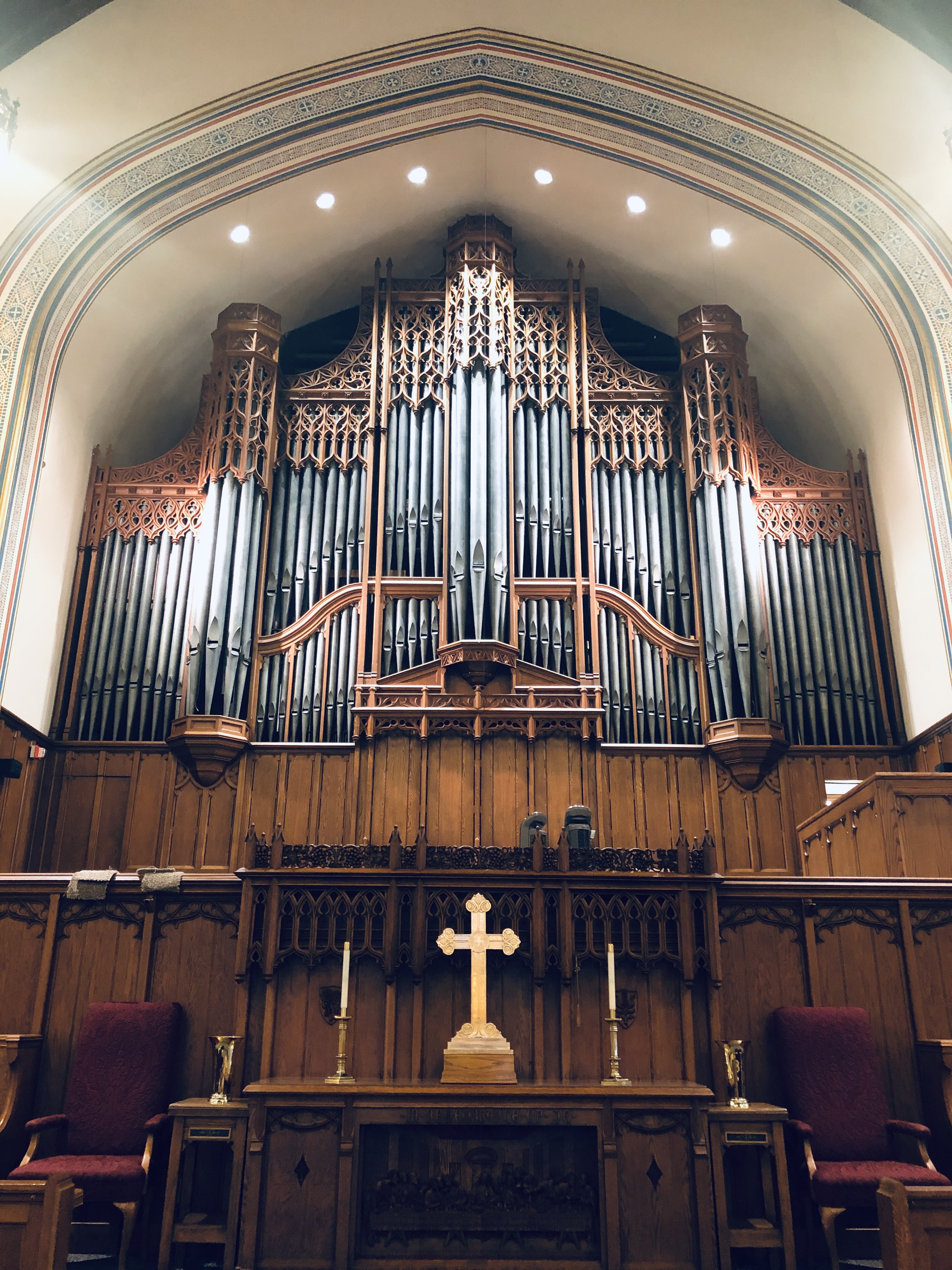
Skinner Pipe Organ at Missouri United Methodist Church

Faurot Field and Marching Mizzou during a game

== Ensembles ==
Student instrumental ensembles include three concert bands: Wind Ensemble, Symphonic Band, and University Band; two jazz Bands: Concert Jazz and Studio Jazz (along with numerous combos); and the University Philharmonic. Choral Ensembles include the University Singers, Concert Choral, and Choral Union. Hitt Street Harmony is a small ensemble of jazz vocalists. The Show-Me Opera combines the talents of vocalist and instrumentalist alike. As well as regular percussion ensembles, the percussion studio supports a world percussion ensemble and a steel pan ensemble.

Though Marching Mizzou is the largest athletic band at the school, there are several smaller ensembles. Mini Mizzou performs at Missouri Tigers men's basketball events. Musical Theater opportunities are provided through the Department of Theater. Faculty ensembles include the Esterhazy Quartet, the Missouri Quintet (woodwinds), Mizzou Brass, and DRAX, a percussion/saxophone duo. The Mizzou New Music Ensemble specializes in the performance of original compositions.

== Events ==
The School of Music plays host to several annual events throughout the year. The Plowman Chamber Music Competition, co-presented by the university, attracts performers from around the country; the 2019 festival presented seventy performers, including fifteen ensembles over five days. Another annual event is the Missouri State Music Festival, organized in cooperation with the Missouri State High School Activities Association. The Mizzou International Composers Festival takes place as part of the New Music Initiative, and host yearly artist in residence, such as Alarm Will Sound.

== Student life ==
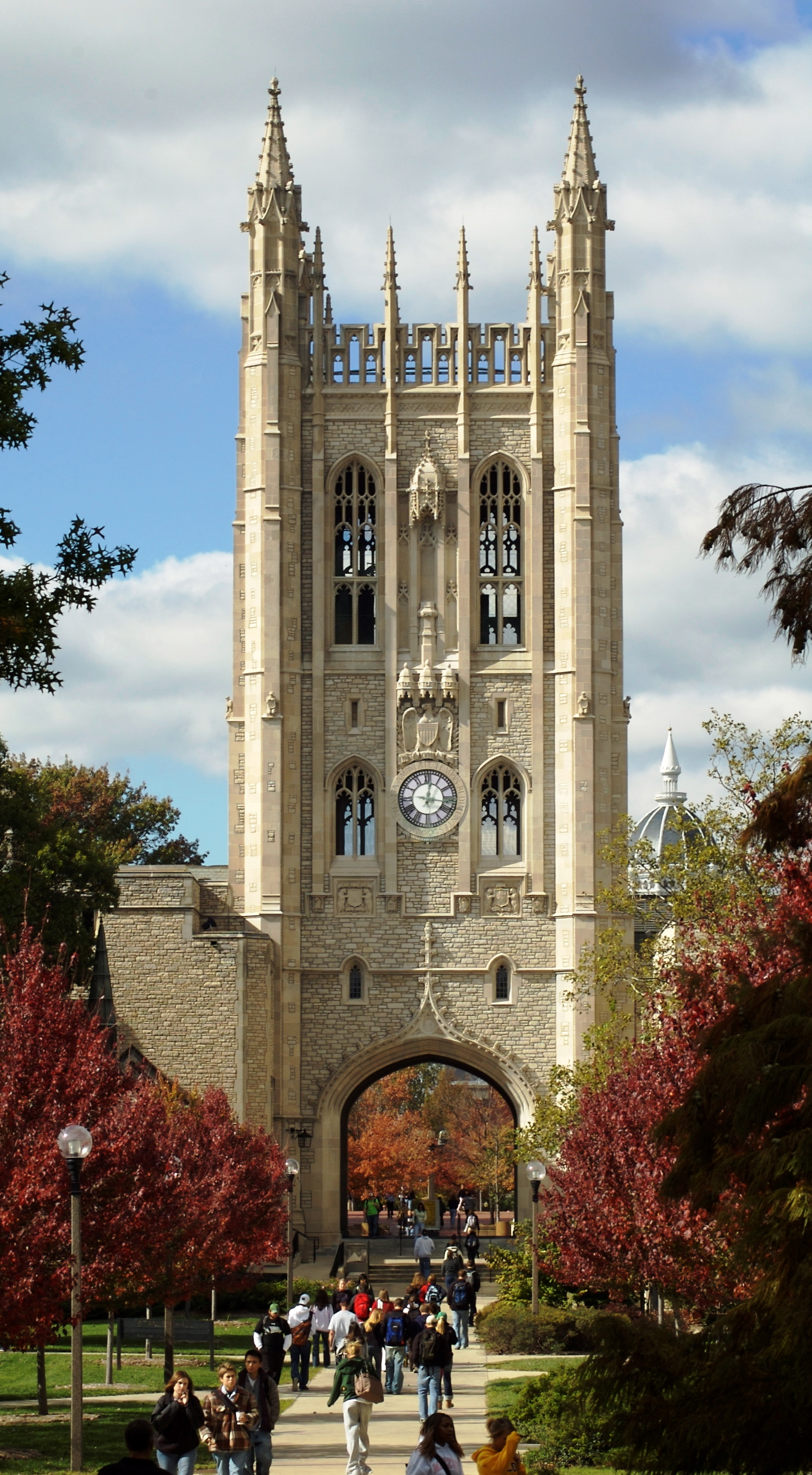
The Memorial Student Union is across Hitt Street from the Fine Arts Building and often hosts School of Music events.

As well as professional student organizations there are four Greek letter organizations open to students with an interest in music. The Zeta chapter of Phi Mu Alpha Sinfonia (ΦΜΑ), a fraternity for men with an interest in music, was established in 1907. A fraternity for women, the Iota Lambda chapter of Sigma Alpha Iota (ΣΑΙ), was established in 1941. In 1982, the Eta Upsilon chapter of Kappa Kappa Psi (ΚΚΨ) and the Zeta Omega chapter of Tau Beta Sigma (ΤΒΣ), were established for collegiate band members.

== Notable people ==
=== Alumni ===
- Sheryl Crow, singer, songwriter, and actress
- Neal E. Boyd, winner of third-season of America's Got Talent
- Jason Forbach, actor and singer
- Stanley Grover, actor and singer
- Arthur Tillman Merritt, musicologist
- Alicia Olatuja, mezzo-soprano, jazz vocalist
- Gene Watts, trombonist and Canadian Brass founder
- Mike Metheny, trumpeter and jazz journalist

=== Faculty ===
- Michael J. Budds, musicologist and long-time faculty member
- John Cheetham, composer
- Julia Gaines, percussionist, director
- Esterhazy Quartet, string quartet made up of faculty members
- William Henry Pommer, known for his songs and chamber music
- James Thomas Quarles, organist and educator

== See also ==
- Columbia Chorale, a community choral group
- Missouri Symphony, a professional symphony orchestra

== Bibliography ==
- Budds, Michael J. (2018). 100 Years of Music-Making at Mizzou. Columbia, Missouri: University of Missouri School of Music. ISBN 978-0-692-98732-2.
- Quarles, James Thomas (1924). University of Missouri Songs (1st ed.). Columbia, Missouri: Curators of the University of Missouri. OCLC 19229550.
- Stephens, Frank Fletcher (1962). A History of the University of Missouri. Columbia, Missouri: University of Missouri Press. ISBN 978-1-258-38656-6.
