= John Cheetham (composer) =

American composer (1939–2024)

John E. Cheetham
- Born: January 13, 1939; Taos, New Mexico, U.S.
- Died: June 25, 2024 (aged 85); Columbia, Missouri, U.S.
- Occupations: Composer, professor
- Spouse: Marilyn Cheetham
- Children: 2

Academic background
- Education: University of New Mexico; University of Washington
- Website: booneslickpress.com

John E. Cheetham (January 13, 1939 – June 25, 2024) was an American composer, educator, performer, and professor emeritus at the University of Missouri where he was a longtime Professor of Composition and Music Theory in the School of Music. His works have been widely performed in the United States and internationally.

== Early life and education ==
Born in Taos, New Mexico on January 13, 1939, Cheetham grew up with a musical background. In 1962, he went on to attend the University of New Mexico where he earned both bachelor's and master's degrees in music. During his attendance at the university, he became the first trombonist in the campus orchestra, which was known as the New Mexico Symphony Orchestra until 2011. This allowed him several opportunities for exposure to new literature, which broadened his musical perspective. In 1965, Cheetham attained a Doctor of Musical Arts in composition from the University of Washington.

== Personal life ==
In Cheetham's tenure, much of his music is published commercially and through his own publishing firm, BoonesLick Press. He also has several incomplete and unpublished works that are catalogued. John was an avid woodworker in his spare time and built everything from an elaborate deck on his home to many pieces of fine-quality furniture. He enjoyed traveling and took many trips. Cheetham died on June 25, 2024, at the age of 85.

== University of Missouri ==
Cheetham became professor of composition and music theory at the University of Missouri School of Music in 1969. During his career, he composed works for virtually all media and published commercially. He retired from the university in 2000 and started his own label, Booneslick Press in 2001. Cheetham was also a member of the Columbia Community Band, where he served as composer-in-residence.

== Selected works ==
Active from 1969 to 2024, Cheetham is known for his contributions as a musician, composer, and music educator. His performances, compositions, and community involvement emphasize the rich and diverse musical traditions of the region from which he drew.

=== Brass Ensembles ===
- A Brass Menagerie
- Allusions
- Colloquies
- Commemorative Fanfare (1979)
- Concertino
- Divertimento
- Fanfare Continental Harmony
- Gaelic Variations
- Open Ye Gates, Swing Wide Ye Portals
- Pavane
- Scherzo (1963)
- Sonata for Brass Quintet
- Three Hymns

=== Choir ===
- Gloria
- Oh, the Depth
- Three British Folk Songs

=== Concert Band ===
- ABA Symphonic March (1986)
- A Christmas Greeting
- Adios
- Booneslickers
- Brass Menagerie
- Fanfare for the Ozarks
- Canticle for Band (1965)
- Dover Crossing
- Elegy
- Fanfare and Steeplechaseref
- Glad Tidings
- Ha'Penny March
- Infinite Horizons (1991)
- In Memoriam Oklahoma City
- Journey of the Three Rivers
- Kitty Hawk
- Overture "Silver Jubilee"
- Runaway Train
- Silhouette
- Songs from the Open Range

=== Mixed Ensembles ===
- Eclectix
- Keystone Celebration (1989)
- Reflections and Rattledance
- Scherzo Concertante

=== Orchestral ===
- Missouri River Songs & Dances
- Three Bentons
- Yuletide Offering

=== Solos ===
- Concoctions for Trumpet
- Homage
- Little Rose
- Prelude and Allegro
- Sonata for Trombone and Piano(2007)

== Bibliography ==
- Budds, Michael J.; Roberts, Elisabeth (2021). A Thematic Catalogue and Performance Chronicle of Works by John Cheetham. Columbia, Missouri: Mizzou Publishing. ISBN 9781616005047.
