= James Thomas Quarles =

American musician (1877–1954)

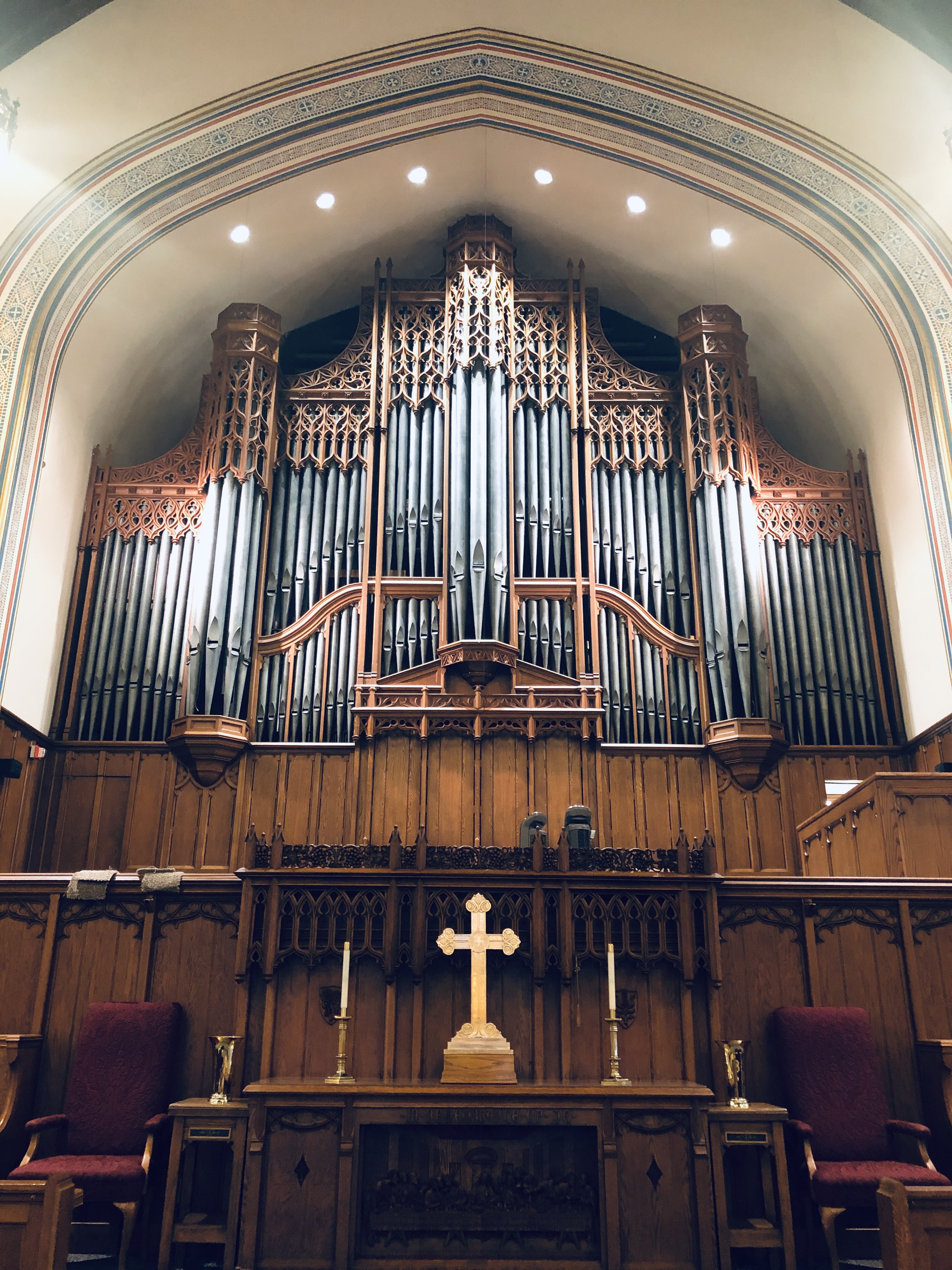
The large Skinner Pipe Organ at Missouri United Methodist Church was acquired and played by Quarles.

James Thomas Quarles (November 7, 1877 in St. Louis, Missouri – March 4, 1954 in Los Angeles, California) was a 20th-century American organist, educator, and academic. He was National President of both the Music Teachers National Association and music fraternity Phi Mu Alpha Sinfonia. In his long tenure he taught at Lindenwood University, Cornell University, and the University of Missouri. He was the founding dean of the University of Missouri School of Fine Arts including the University of Missouri School of Music. In 1905 he wrote one of Cornell's school songs "Cornell Hymn" In the 1920s he edited a compilation of Missouri school songs and was advisor to the Zeta chapter of Phi Mu Alpha Sinfonia. He acquired and played the organ at Missouri United Methodist Church in Columbia, Missouri.

For a time Annie White Baxter served as his secretary. He studied organ under famed St. Louis organist Charles Henry Galloway.
