= Missouri United Methodist Church =

Historic church in Missouri, United States

- U.S. National Register of Historic Places
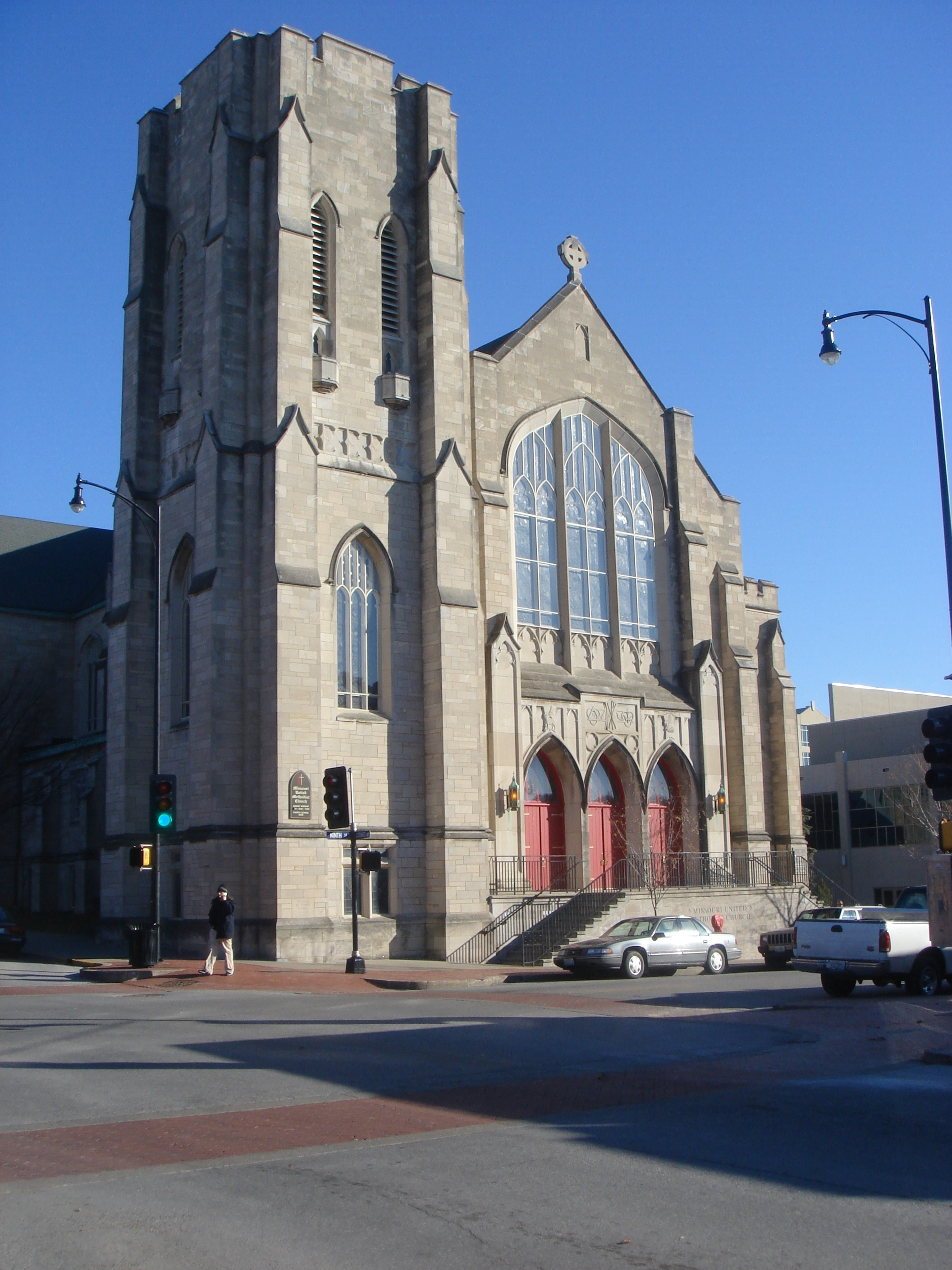

- Location within Missouri Location within the United States
- Location: 204 S. 9th St., Columbia, Missouri
- Coordinates: 38°56′57″N 92°19′37″W
- Area: less than one acre
- Built: 1925-1930
- Architect: Epple, John A.
- Architectural style: Late Gothic Revival
- NRHP reference No.: 80002312
- Added to NRHP: September 4, 1980

The Missouri United Methodist Church is a United Methodist church in downtown Columbia, Missouri. Its congregation formed the first Methodist Church in Columbia in 1837. The present building on 9th Street built between 1925 and 1930 is constructed out of Indiana Bedford limestone in a Late Gothic Revival style. The Stained Glass windows, including the large History of Methodism window at the rear of the sanctuary, are some of the most detailed in Mid-Missouri. The sanctuary seats 1,000 people. It was added to the National Register of Historic Places in 1980.

== Music ==
The Missouri United Methodist Church has a long music tradition. It has a large Skinner pipe organ (1928, Opus 750) acquired by University of Missouri School of Music Dean James Thomas Quarles. The Church hosts an annual Missouri United Church Concert Series featuring the Columbia Chorale, the 9th Street Philharmonic Orchestra as well as other well-known groups such as Chanticleer and the Vienna Boys Choir.

== Bibliography ==
- Stephens, Frank F. (1965). History of the Missouri Methodist Church. Columbia, Missouri: Missouri United Methodist Church. OCLC 1144689380.
