= Wilbur Lin =

Taiwanese-American conductor

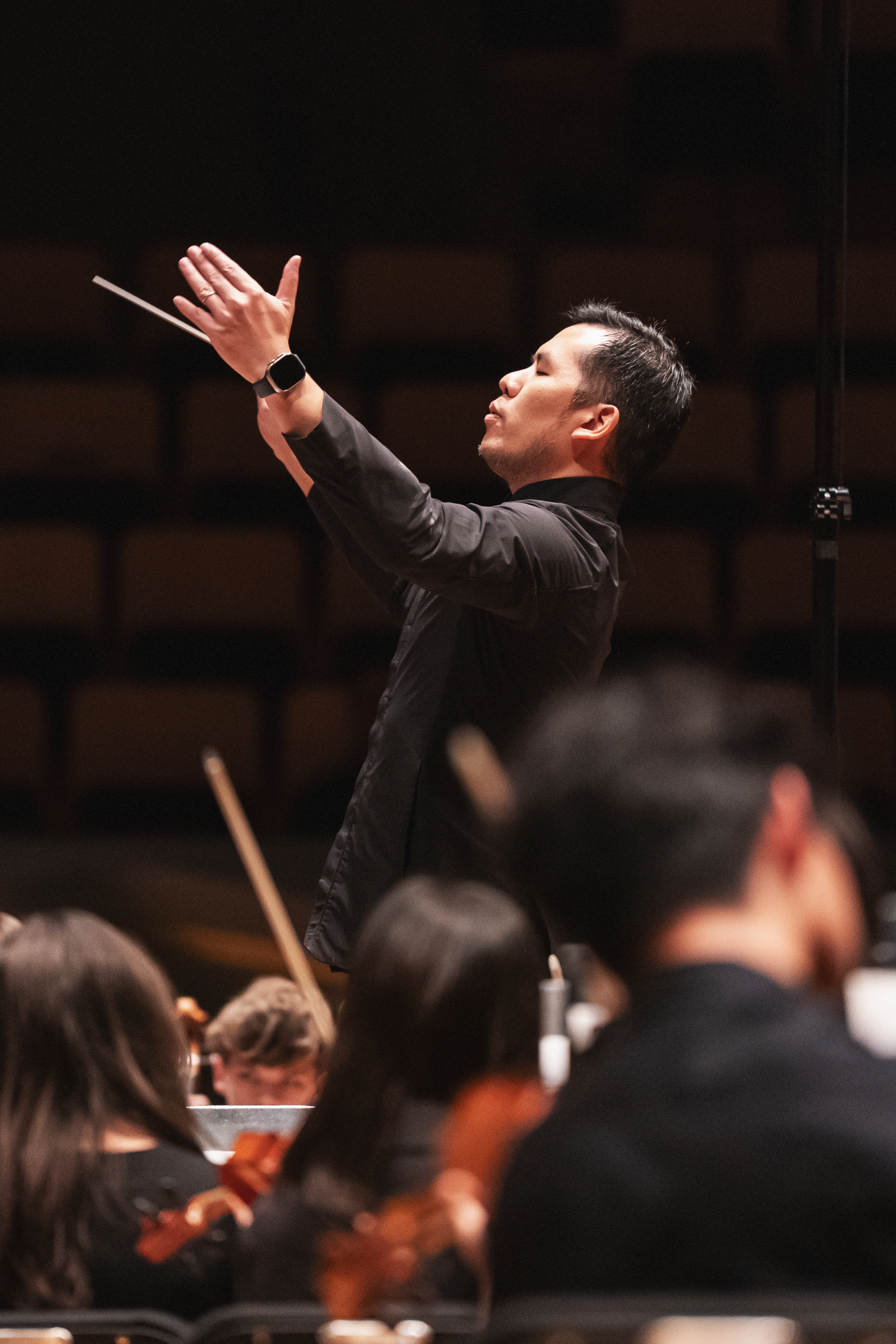
- Born: New Jersey
- Education: National Taiwan Normal University; Royal Northern College of Music; Indiana University Jacobs School of Music
- Occupation: Conductor

Wilbur Lin (Chinese: 林韡函) is a Taiwanese–American conductor best known for his work with orchestras and operas in the United States and Taiwan. As of 2023, he is the music director of the Missouri Symphony in Columbia, Missouri, Music Director of the Denver Young Artists Orchestra, and associate conductor of the Colorado Symphony Orchestra. Previously, he was assistant conductor of the Cincinnati Symphony Orchestra and a professor at Northern Illinois University in DeKalb, Illinois. Lin was born in New Jersey and moved to Taiwan at age six. In 2008, while attending National Taiwan Normal University, he founded the Chamber Philharmonic Taipei. Lin has conducted ensembles in Europe, Latin America, East Asia, and the United States, including the Taipei Symphony Orchestra, Cincinnati Ballet, Manchester Camerata, Rochester Philharmonic Orchestra, Ann Arbor Symphony Orchestra, Symphony Nova Scotia and Louisiana Philharmonic Orchestra.

== Childhood and education ==
Born in New Jersey, United States, Wilbur Lin moved to Taiwan at age six with his parents. His father was an amateur choir conductor. Lin has credited the musical environment at churches he attended with influencing his career choice. He was a boy soprano and began playing piano at age six.

Lin went on to study piano and harpsichord at the National Taiwan Normal University in Taipei, receiving his undergraduate degree in 2011. At school he would study with Apo Hsu, who was formerly music director of the Springfield Symphony in Springfield, Missouri-the same U.S state as the Missouri Symphony Lin would later lead. In 2013, Lin received a master of music degree in conducting from the Royal Northern College of Music in Manchester, United Kingdom. He holds a doctoral degree in orchestral conducting from Indiana University's Jacobs School of Music, where he studied with David Effron and Arthur Fagen. His dissertation is titled: Performing Bach Cantatas with Modern Orchestras: A Modern Conductor's Handbook for Applying Historically Informed Practice to Today's Ensembles. Lin has been coached by Yannick Nézet-Séguin, Mark Elder, and Helmuth Rilling and is a graduate of the Riccardo Muti's Italian Opera Academy in Ravenna, Italy.

== Career ==
In 2008, as an undergraduate student, Lin founded the Chamber Philharmonic Taipei. Originally composed of students, the orchestra became fully professional in 2013; he continues to conduct the ensemble as of 2022. Lin was employed as assistant conductor of the Cincinnati Symphony Orchestra from 2019 to 2022. In 2022, he became an assistant professor at Northern Illinois University in DeKalb, Illinois, where he directs the University Philharmonic and Opera Theatre.

Lin becomes the third music director of the Missouri Symphony in Columbia, Missouri in 2023.

Cultural offices
Preceded by Kirk Trevor	Music Director, Missouri Symphony; 2023–	Succeeded by Incumbent
