= Marching Mizzou =

Marching band for the University of Missouri

- School: University of Missouri
- Location: Columbia, Missouri
- Conference: SEC
- Founded: 1885; 141 years ago
- Director: Amy M. Knopps
- Assistant Directors: Christian Noon and Peter Zambito
- Members: 350
- Fight song: "Every True Son" and "Fight Tiger"

Uniform
- Website: music.missouri.edu/ensemble/marching-mizzou

Marching Mizzou, M2, or The Big 'M' of the Midwest is the performing marching band for the University of Missouri, founded in 1885 as a college military band. Originally consisting of only 12 members, it is now the largest ensemble on the MU campus, drawing students from nearly every major. Marching Mizzou performs at all home football games of the Missouri Tigers football team, in addition to other university events; and expanded Mini Mizzou travels to two away games per season, while the entire band regularly follows the team to conference championship games and bowl games. Marching Mizzou's signature drill "Flip Tigers" has been a well-known tradition of its pre-game show since 1960. It is instructed by University of Missouri School of Music faculty.

== History ==
=== Cadet Band ===
Marching Mizzou began as the University of Missouri Cadet Band in 1885, founded by Frederick Pannell from the encouragement of Lt. Enoch H. Crowder. Initially, membership was limited to members of the school's Corps of Cadets. The band made only one appearance in the 1885 season, at a football game against the University of Kansas and was so well received by the assembled students and alumni that they were asked back to the next season's football games. The Corps obliged, and applications for membership grew quickly. Being a military band, the group performed at both Cadet Corps events and school events, playing music from composers like Beethoven and Wagner.

=== Growing and opening up ===
In 1903, a student band was created to supplement the military band. Under George Venable, director from 1910 to 1946, the band eventually moved away from military marching and acquired the characteristics of a show band. The big "M" formation appeared in the 1920s, and the band won highest honors in the Big 6 Conference in 1934. Following the dissolution of the Corps of Cadets in 1944, membership was opened to every male in the university and the group moved into the Department of Music under the direction of George Wilson. The band's first annual "High School Band Day" was held in 1945, inviting high schools to participate in a massed performance during halftime. In 1956, The University of Missouri Cadet Band split into a concert band, a university band, and the marching band, resembling the current structure. Charles Emmons became director in 1957, and under his direction, women were allowed to join the band in 1958; most bands at the time remained male-only.

By 1966, over 50 bands and 4,000 students were participating in Band Day, requiring two sub-conductors to relay cues to the entire group. Membership swelled up to 231 in 1969 under Alexander Pickard, and the one credit-hour course counted toward Mizzou's physical education requirement.

=== The Golden Girls ===
In 1957, director Charles Emmons added a group of baton-twirling majorettes and two feature twirlers to the band. The group became known as the Golden Girls after purchasing now-iconic gold sequined uniforms in 1965. When Alexander Pickard became director of Marching Mizzou in 1966, he began adding dancing to the Golden Girls' routines. Patty Kespohl was hired as the first coach for the Golden Girls in 1968.

For the next decade, the majorettes evolved into a dance team as their popularity across the campus grew. By the time they ceased carrying their batons in 1976, the group almost entirely was performing as dancers and had only kept the batons out of tradition. Under Kespohl's coaching, they adopted white boots and also performed as cheerleaders for the St. Louis Cardinals from 1976 to 1981. Starting in 1978, they also faced criticism from new chancellor Barbara Uehling for perceived sexism and lack of diversity during the ongoing Women's liberation movement. Despite administrative resistance, the Golden Girls continued to be featured prominently by Marching Mizzou under Norm Ruebling, who was Marching Mizzou director from 1988 to 1993. They began performing as a pom squad at basketball games and started competing in dance and cheer competitions.

Kespohl led the Golden Girls to a national title, winning the 1991 NCA Collegiate Cheer and Pom Dance competition. They were invited to perform at the 1991 Japan Classic, and went on to win the NCA Championship again in 1992. Patty Kespohl resigned as coach later that year, and the Golden Girls became a separate entity from the band; a few feature twirlers remained a part of Marching Mizzou. The dance team joined the athletics department in 1993 and were directed by Korene Ousley for a year and a half. Kespohl returned to coach the Golden Girls until 1997.

Shannon Fry became head coach of the Golden Girls in 1997, and led them to a United Spirit Association national title in 2003. Under Fry's coaching, the Golden Girls continued to perform at halftime alongside Marching Mizzou. Fry was fired in 2019 when the Missouri Athletics Department decided to restructure its spirit squads, announcing that the Golden Girls and Cheer programs would be merged into a single organization.

Cayla Timberlake became head coach in 2019.

=== Notable appearances ===
Marching Mizzou was invited by President Truman to lead his Inaugural Parade in 1949; however, the Missouri legislature refused to fund the trip. As a consolation, the legislature allowed the band to march at the governor's inauguration in Jefferson City. Marching Mizzou performed at Wembley Stadium in England in 1975 to 100,000 spectators. In January 2001, Marching Mizzou succeeded in traveling to Washington D.C. to perform in the inaugural parade for President George W. Bush. In March 2012, and then again in 2016, Marching Mizzou traveled to Dublin and Limerick, Ireland to perform in the St. Patrick's Day Parade and an International Marching Competition, respectively. Marching Mizzou was scheduled to return to Ireland in March 2020 for the St. Patrick's Festival Parade in Dublin and the 50th Annual International Band Championships in Limerick, but the trip was initially postponed to 2021, then ultimately cancelled due to the COVID-19 pandemic. In April 2021, Marching Mizzou earned an invitation to perform in the 96th Annual Macy's Thanksgiving Day Parade on November 24, 2022. Marching Mizzou was part of the NBC Broadcast's opening number with Lea Michele and the Cast of Funny Girl, then led the parade. During their featured performance on 34th Street, they performed Sheryl Crow's hit song 'All I Wanna Do'; Crow was an alumnus of Mizzou. The day before, members of Marching Mizzou performed on the Today Show, performing a range of Mizzou traditional selections throughout the entirety of the broadcast. In January 2023, it was announced that Marching Mizzou earned an invitation to perform in the 2024 St. Patrick's Festival Parade in Dublin and plan to travel to Ireland in 2024. After their performance in Dublin, Marching Mizzou was named "Best Overall Band" of the parade out of 14 bands from Ireland, France, and the United States.

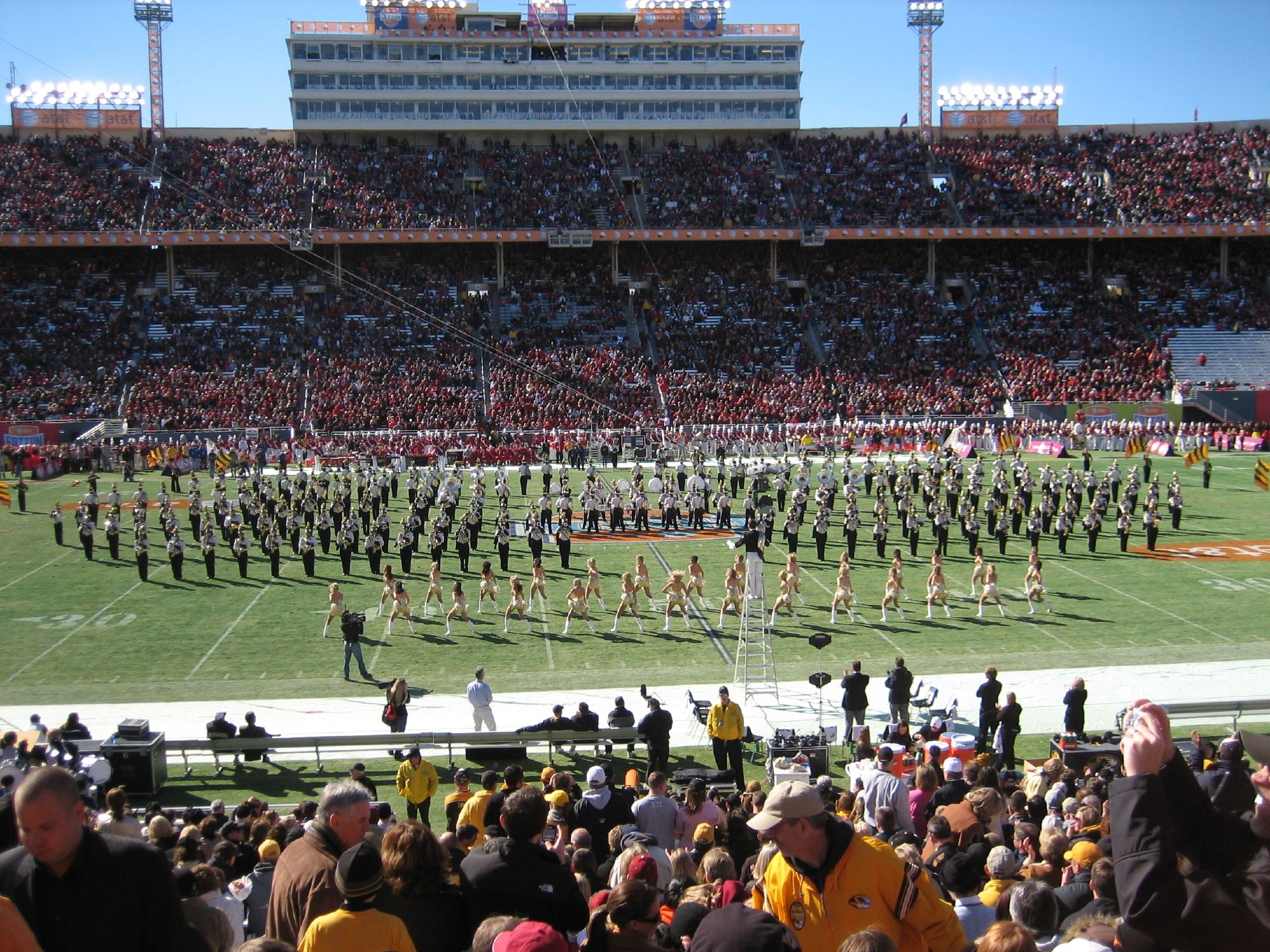
Marching Mizzou at the 2008 Cotton Bowl

For several years joining the Southeastern Conference, Marching Mizzou would send a reduced band to every away conference game. Despite receiving substantial boosts in funding in 2014, Dr. D. Bradley Snow, director from 2010 to 2016, claimed that Marching Mizzou is the least-funded marching band in the SEC. Today Marching Mizzou has returned to sending an expanded Mini Mizzou to two away football games per season.

== Marching Mizzou Today ==
Marching Mizzou today is directed by Dr. Amy M. Knopps, Dr. Christian Noon, and Dr. Pete Zambito, with 350 band members, including a full color guard, Drumline, three feature twirlers, and the Golden Girls. Before every season, the band spends a week learning its pre-game show, preparing stands music, and starting on its normally first of seven halftime shows. The voices of Marching Mizzou are Greg Crocker and Brandt Crocker, who is also known as "The Voice of DCI".

The MU Bands hosts three annual events for high schools. "Marching Mizzou Band Day" brings in marching bands from across the state, to practice and perform with Marching Mizzou at the season's first halftime. The pieces for the performance are often specifically composed to match a variety of experience levels. Marching Mizzou also hosts a marching competition called "Champion of Champions" and a Homecoming Parade, both open to high school bands.

Select members of Marching Mizzou audition to form Mini Mizzou, a pep band founded in 1973 by Tim Lautzenheiser that attends other events on and around campus, including sporting events and requested appearances. Mini Mizzou will follow the Missouri Tigers Volleyball and Basketball teams to selected championship and tournament games.

== Pre-game ==
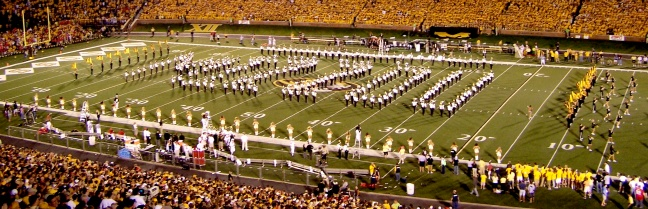
Initial "Flip Tigers" spell-out of MIZZOU

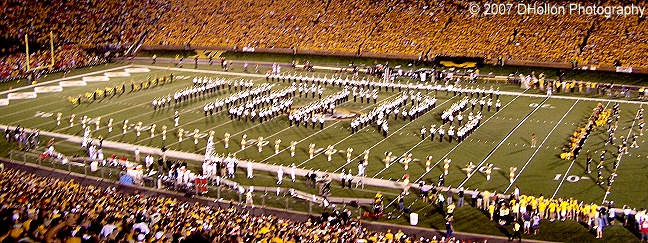
Completed "Flip Tigers" maneuver, now spelling TIGERS

The Block "M" formation is a tradition which has existed since the 1920s.

For five years upon joining the SEC in 2012, Marching Mizzou would form the Southeastern Conference's logo. In 2017, Marching Mizzou returned to forming the outline of the state of Missouri when playing of the alma mater of the University of Missouri, Old Missouri.

Marching Mizzou's Flip Tigers is a drill performed to MU's second fight song, "Fight Tiger". The band sequentially forms the word "MIZZOU" and then completes a rapid, 8-count transition into the word "TIGERS". This move was created by director Charles Emmons and his assistant John Christie for the 1960 Orange Bowl.

== Bowl game appearances ==
Marching Mizzou has supported the Mizzou Tigers at all of the team's bowl games since the marching band was first founded, except for 1979:

- 2024 Music City Bowl
- 2023 Cotton Bowl Classic
- 2022 Gasparilla Bowl
- 2021 Armed Forces Bowl
- 2018 Liberty Bowl
- 2017 Texas Bowl
- 2015 Citrus Bowl (2014 season)
- 2014 Cotton Bowl Classic (2013 season)
- 2011 Independence Bowl (reduced band due to funding and low cost: 80 members)
- 2010 Insight Bowl
- 2009 Texas Bowl
- 2008 Alamo Bowl
- 2008 Cotton Bowl Classic (2007 Season)
- 2006 Sun Bowl
- 2005 Independence Bowl
- 2003 Independence Bowl
- 1998 Insight.com Bowl
- 1997 Holiday Bowl
- 1983 Holiday Bowl
- 1981 Tangerine Bowl
- 1980 Liberty Bowl
- ~~1979 Hall of Fame Classic~~: money was not offered to send the full band, and Marching Mizzou chose not to attend the game with a reduced band.
- 1978 Liberty Bowl
- 1973 Sun Bowl
- 1972 Fiesta Bowl
- 1970 Orange Bowl (1969 season)
- 1968 Gator Bowl
- 1966 Sugar Bowl (1965 season)
- 1962 Bluebonnet Bowl
- 1961 Orange Bowl (1960 season)
- 1960 Orange Bowl (1959 season)
- 1950 Gator Bowl (1949 season)
- 1949 Gator Bowl (1948 season)
- 1946 Cotton Bowl Classic (1945 season)
- 1942 Sugar Bowl (1941 season)
- 1940 Orange Bowl (1939 season)
- 1924 Christmas Festival
