= Chamber Philharmonic Taipei =

Chamber orchestra based in Taipei, Taiwan

- Orchestra
- Native name: 臺北小愛樂
- Founded: 2008
- Principal conductor: Wilbur Lin

The Chamber Philharmonic Taipei (Chinese: 臺北小愛樂; pinyin: Táiběi Xiǎoàiyuè) is a chamber orchestra based in Taipei, Taiwan, supported by the Taipei City Government Department of Cultural Affairs and National Culture and Arts Foundation. Together with its affiliated choir, the Bach Choir, the orchestra hosts concerts in Zhongshan Hall, National Recital Hall, among other venues in Taipei.

== History ==
The orchestra was founded in spring 2008 by conductor Wilbur Lin.

== See also ==
- List of symphony orchestras in Taiwan
