= Michael J. Budds =

American musicologist and university professor (1947–2020)

- Born: June 11, 1947; Pana, Illinois
- Died: November 19, 2020 (aged 73); Columbia, Missouri

Academic background
- Education: Knox College; University of Iowa

Academic work
- Discipline: Musicology
- Sub-discipline: Ethnomusicology; Music history African-American music Music in Victorian England
- Institutions: University of Missouri; School of Music
- Main interests: Music of the United States

Michael Joseph Budds (June 11, 1947 – November 19, 2020) was an American musicologist, and longtime professor, at the University of Missouri in Columbia, Missouri. In addition to teaching, he wrote and edited a number of works, including a widely used textbook on American popular music. Also a philanthropist, he established the Budds Center for American Music Studies at the University of Missouri School of Music where he taught. He was the first musicologist inducted into the Missouri Music Hall of Fame. Budds taught at Missouri for 37 years, until his death on November 19, 2020.

== Personal life ==
Budds was born in Pana, Illinois on June 11, 1947, to Leon “Buddsie” Budds and Helen Kramer Budds. He attended Knox College and obtained his PhD from the University of Iowa. Budds served in the U.S. Navy during the Vietnam War and began teaching at the University of Missouri in 1982. His home was in the East Campus Neighborhood of Columbia, Missouri. Budds was known for his devotion to the music of Ella Fitzgerald. He was buried at the Rosemond Cemetery in Pana, Illinois.

== University of Missouri ==
Budds taught undergraduate and graduate courses in music biography, music appreciation, music history, and research. He taught over 10,000 students at the University of Missouri. His class on music appreciation entitled Jazz, Pop, & Rock would become the most popular class offered at the university. His research efforts were devoted to the study of American music, African-American music, and music in Victorian England. He served as the Area Coordinator of the Musicology & Ethnomusicology Area within the School of Music up until his retirement. In 2019, he donated 4 million dollars to establish the Budds Center for American Music Studies in memory of his family, of which he was the only remaining member.

== Legacy ==
The Budds Center for American Music Studies is located in Room 135 of the Fine Arts Building (FAB) at the University of Missouri in Columbia, Missouri. It contains hundreds of musical resources, including books, CDs, records, sheet music, visual materials, Budds's manuscripts, and other archival documents. The resources and programs supported by the Budds Center focus on American music, preserving Budds's passion for music education and performance. The Budds Center also sponsors guest speakers and works with the American Musicological Society (AMS).

In addition to its physical location, the Budds Center fosters collaboration between Mizzou's campus and the greater community through its old-time jams, events in which musicians on various instruments, including guitars, banjos, and fiddles, gather to play historic Missouri tunes.

To honor Budds's contribution to musicology and music education, the center sponsors select musicological research and graduate students. It also provides teaching resources and lesson plans regarding Missouri music.

The Budds Center is currently under the direction of Dr. Megan Murph (PhD, University of Kentucky).

== Honors ==
In 2000, Budds was named a William T Kemper Fellow for Excellence in Teaching at the University of Missouri and at the time of his retirement was a Curators’ Distinguished Teaching Professor Emeritus. In 2019, He was the recipient of the William H. Byler Distinguished Professor Award. Budds was inducted into the Missouri Music Hall of Fame in 2009; he was the first musicologist to be honored so. Budds was an honorary member of the music fraternity Phi Mu Alpha Sinfonia.

== Works ==
Budds was a contributor to The New Grove Dictionary of American Music; The New Grove Dictionary of Jazz; Women & Music: A History; Bleep! Censoring Rock and Rap; and American National Biography. As a member of the College Music Society, he served as editor of the series Monographs and Bibliographies in American Music. He also authored several works, including:

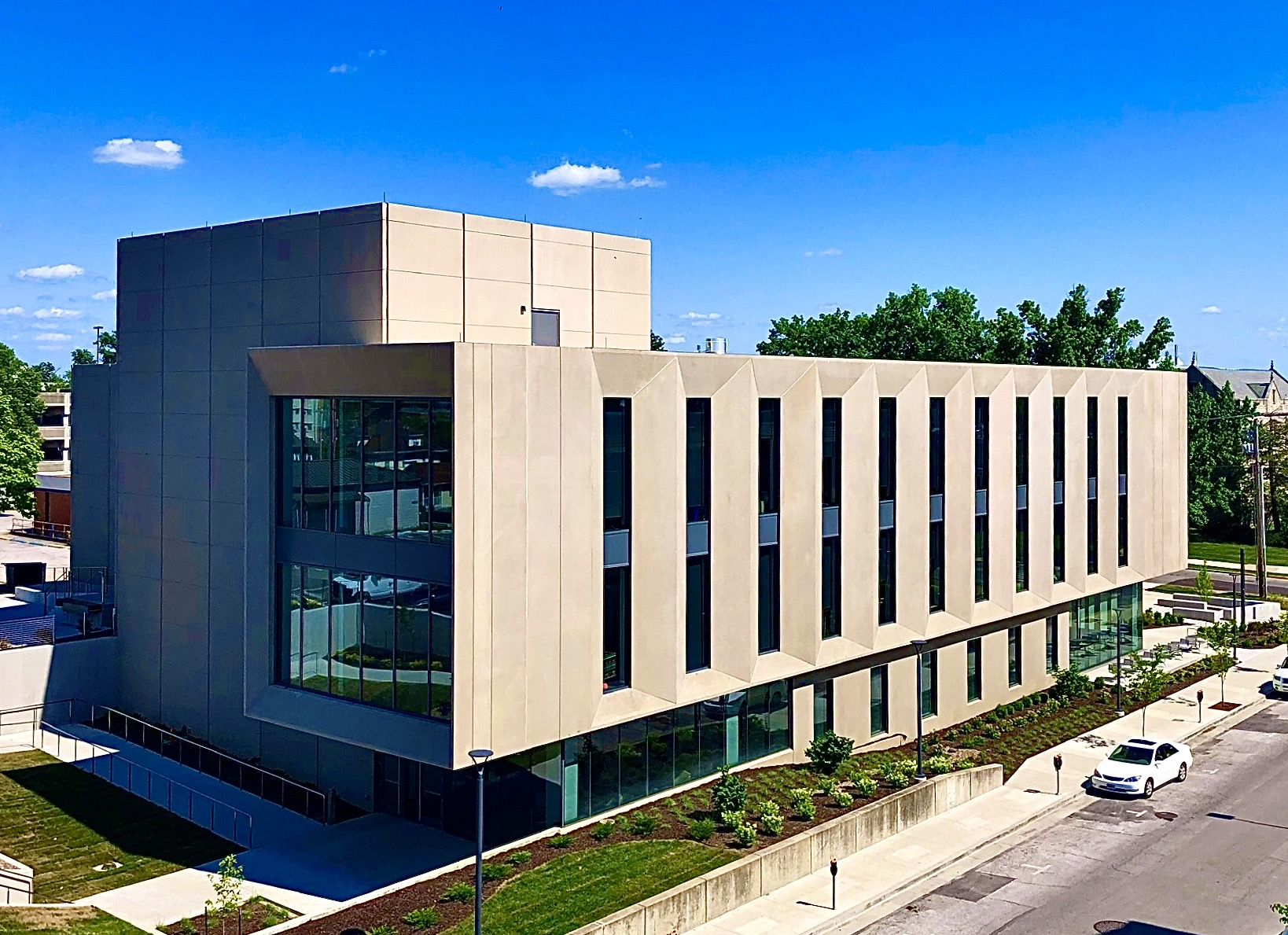
The Sinquefield Music Center in Columbia, Missouri

- Rock Recall: Annotated Readings in American Popular Music from the Emergence of Rock and Roll to the Demise of the Woodstock Nation (1993)
- Jazz in the Sixties (1978 and 1990)
- Jazz & the Germans: Essays on the Influence of "Hot" American Idioms on the 20th-century German Music (2003)
- 100 Years of Music-Making at Mizzou (2018)
- 200 Memorable Missouri Musical Moments: Commentary, Historical Photographs, & Video Clips (in honor of the Missouri Bicentennial, 2020)
- Thematic Catalogue and Performance Chronical of the Music of John Cheetham (2021)

== See also ==
- Music of the United States
- Ella Fitzgerald discography
