= Esterhazy Quartet =

American string quartet

The Esterhazy Quartet is an American string quartet founded in 1968 as the ensemble-in-residence of the University of Missouri and is composed of faculty members at the University of Missouri School of Music in Columbia. The Esterhazy Quartet's current members are:

- Eva Szekely (violin)
- Julie Rosenfeld (violin)
- Leslie Perna (viola)
- Eli Lara (cello)

The founding members of the Esterhazy Quartet are Carlton Spotts (cello), Ulrich Dannemann (viola), Eugene Gratovich (violin), and Ruth Allen (violin). Other previous ensemble members include John McLeod (violin), Carolyn Kenneson (viola), Susan Jensen (violin) and Darry Dolezal (cello).

The ensemble takes its name from the Esterházy royalty of 18th-century Austria and the family's association with and patronage of the composer Joseph Haydn.

While the Esterhazy Quartet performs both standard and modern string quartet repertoire, the ensemble is committed to performing and promoting the music of contemporary composers, particularly the music of modern composers of both North and South America.

The Esterhazy Quartet maintains an active touring and performing schedule in the Americas and Europe, including performances for the Mozarteum Argentino in Buenos Aires, the Beethoven Society in Santiago de Chile, the Haydn Festspiele in Austria, and the Banff Centre for Arts and Creativity in Banff, Alberta. They have been frequently featured on National Public Radio broadcasts such as the highly acclaimed Hear America First and Quartessence series.

Festival appearances for the ensemble include the Western Arts Festival, the Texas Music Festival, and the International Chamber Music Festival in Belém, Brazil.

Since 1996, the Esterhazy Quartet has collaborated with the Berklee College of Music in (Boston, Massachusetts) to spend a week as a visiting ensemble-in-residence that offers composition students not only the opportunity to write and develop pieces for string quartet ensemble, but also allows students to hear a world-class ensemble perform their compositions. Additionally, the Esterhazy Quartet has sponsored the annual Esterhazy String Quartet Seminar at the University of Missouri School of Music for a select group of sixteen advanced high school violin, viola, and cello students, wherein students study and perform an entire work from chamber music repertoire, participate in private lessons, receive ensemble coaching, and also perform in solo masterclasses.

The Esterhazy Quartet's recordings can be heard on the CRI (now New World Records), Albany Records, and Spectrum labels.
