= Missouri Theatre (Columbia, Missouri) =

- Missouri Theater
- U.S. National Register of Historic Places
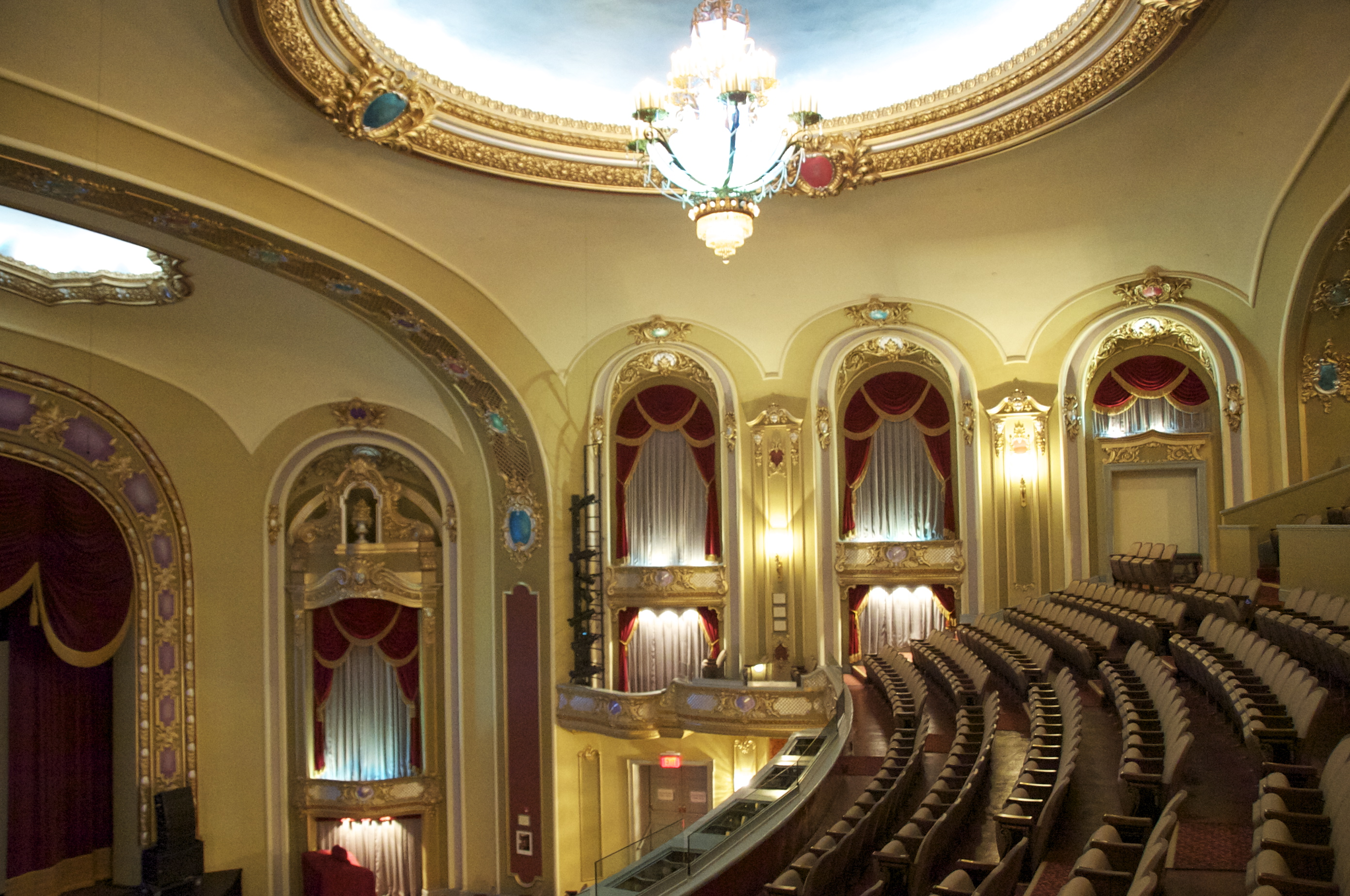

- Location within Missouri Location within the United States
- Location: 201-215 S. 9th St., Columbia, Missouri
- Coordinates: 38°56′57″N 92°19′39″W
- Area: 0.3 acres (0.12 ha)
- Built: 1928
- Architect: Boller Brothers
- NRHP reference No.: 79001349
- Added to NRHP: June 6, 1979

The Missouri Theatre, is a concert and entertainment venue in downtown Columbia, Missouri, occupying most of a city block between 9th street between Locust and Elm Streets. It was designed after the Opéra Garnier by the Boller Brothers, built in 1928, and is on the National Register of Historic Places. It is Columbia's only surviving pre-Depression movie palace and vaudeville stage. In 2011, the University of Missouri began a three-year lease of the facility. The Missouri Theatre is the resident home of the Missouri Symphony Orchestra, and is also frequently used by University of Missouri and civic groups. As of July 1, 2014, The University of Missouri took over ownership of the Missouri Theatre. It is one of the main performance venues for the University of Missouri School of Music.

== History ==
The theater opened on October 5, 1928. It was built at a cost of over 400,000 dollars which is equivalent to over 4.5 million dollars today. Advertisements in the Columbia Daily Tribune proclaimed the "Formal Opening of your new Missouri Theatre—Friday Evening… A $400,000 Showhouse of Unrivaled Beauty and Extravagant Setting in Central Missouri. The Magnificent Splendor of This Palace of Amusement Will Dazzle and Thrill You." Telegrams were received from The United Artist in Hollywood, as well as from actors such as Charlie Chaplin and Gloria Swanson, congratulating the managers of the theater. On opening night the performers included The Missouri Rockettes (later to become the Radio City Rockettes) and Jack Keith and his Missouri Orchestra. It was rumored that Bob Hope also made an appearance. The Theatre operated much in this fashion as well as a movie palace until 1953.

Because of its size and extravagance the Missouri Theatre was difficult to maintain and was leased to Commonwealth Theaters, Inc. in 1953 who operated it as a single-screen movie theater until 1983. In 1979 the building was listed on the National Register of Historic Places. The advent of the multiscreen cinemas in Columbia lead to the eventually purchase of the theatre by the Missouri Symphony Society on January 7, 1988.

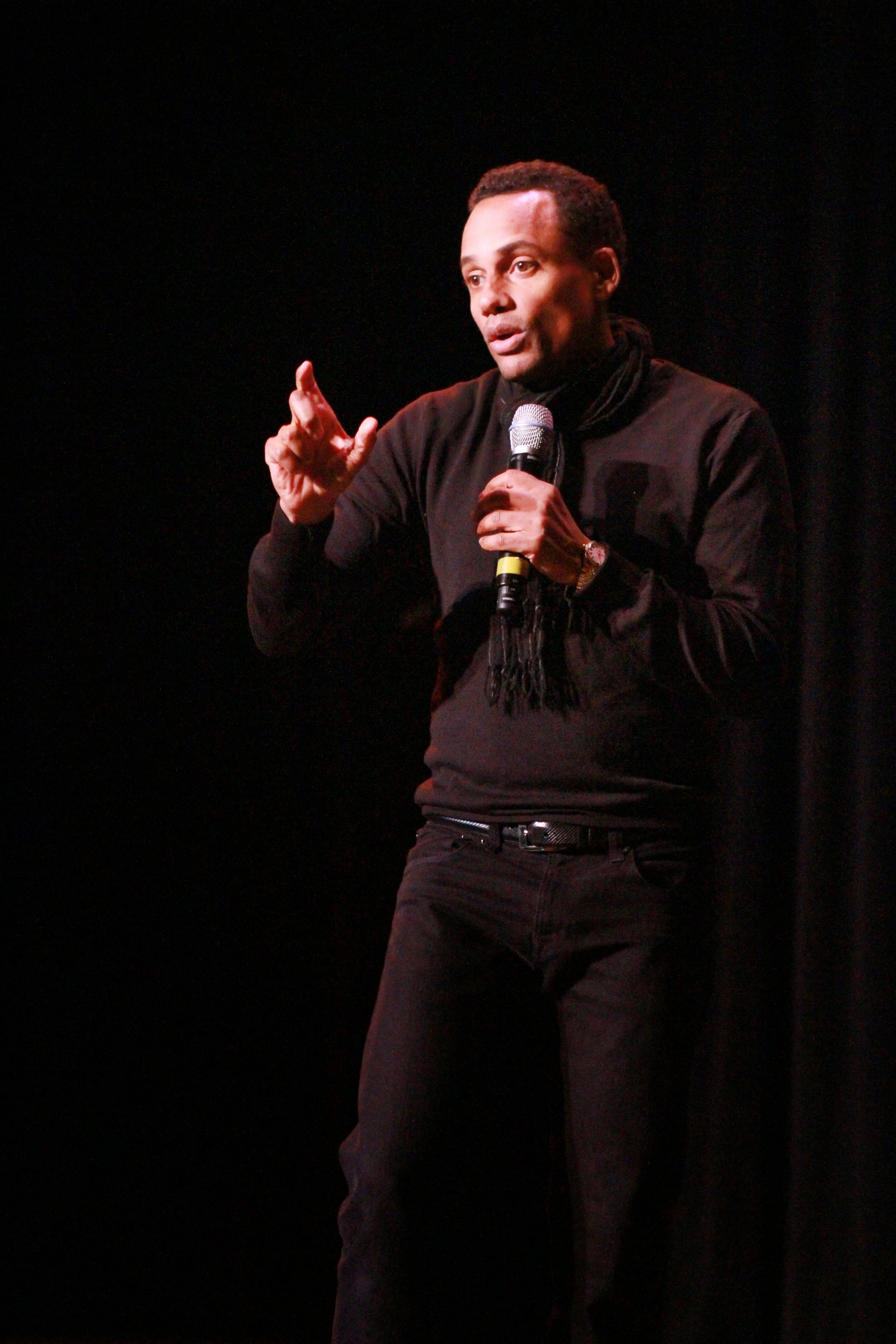
Author Hill Harper speaks in January 2014.

In 2002, the Missouri Symphony Society began plans to transform the Missouri Theatre into the Missouri Theatre Center for the Arts (MTCA). The Missouri Symphony Society experienced record-breaking success in 2005 with the Hot Summer Nights Music Festival as more than 11,200 music lovers attended concerts featuring Maestro Kirk Trevor, the Missouri Symphony Orchestra, and world-renowned guest artists throughout its eight-week summer season.

On July 28, 2007, the restoration of the Missouri Theatre began after the conclusion of the Hot Summer Nights Music Festival. The following summer, the fully restored Missouri Theatre Center for the Arts re-opened with Tony Bennett and the Hot Summer Nights Music Festival. The renovations included a new second floor with administrative offices and a 2,500 sq. ft. rooftop patio.

In 2011 Missouri Theatre became home to the University Concert Series, and acts as a recital and performance venue for many University of Missouri School of Music performance groups. The Box Office is operated by Event Production Services a department of Operation Auxiliary and Services in the division of Campus Operations at the University of Missouri.

== Architecture ==
The interior of the building is ornate baroque and rococo style of the Louis XIV and XV periods. It was designed after the Paris Opera House by the Boller Brothers Architects of Kansas City, Missouri. Much original detail still exist, including Belgian marble wainscoting, plaster reliefs, stained glass and, one of the most notable features, an 1800-pound Italian auditorium chandelier featuring crystal prisms and etched panels. At one time, the deep red carpet in the grand lobby had the Great Seal of Missouri and the letter M woven into it.

== Missouri Symphony Orchestra ==
Missouri Theatre is the home of mid-Missouri's only professional resident symphony orchestra, the Missouri Symphony Orchestra (MSO). Established by the Missouri Symphony Society in 1976, the MSO is composed of musicians from throughout the United States and around the world.

Through its annual eight-week season, the Hot Summer Nights Music Festival in June and July, and tours throughout the state and beyond, the Missouri Symphony Orchestra has been heralded by the Kansas City Star as an ensemble that performs with "energy and elan, as well as secure technique." Since 2001, the MSO has been directed by Maestro Kirk Trevor.

== Arts Education ==
In addition to the Missouri Symphony Society's artistic programming, the Missouri Theatre hosts multiple arts education programs and organizations, including the:

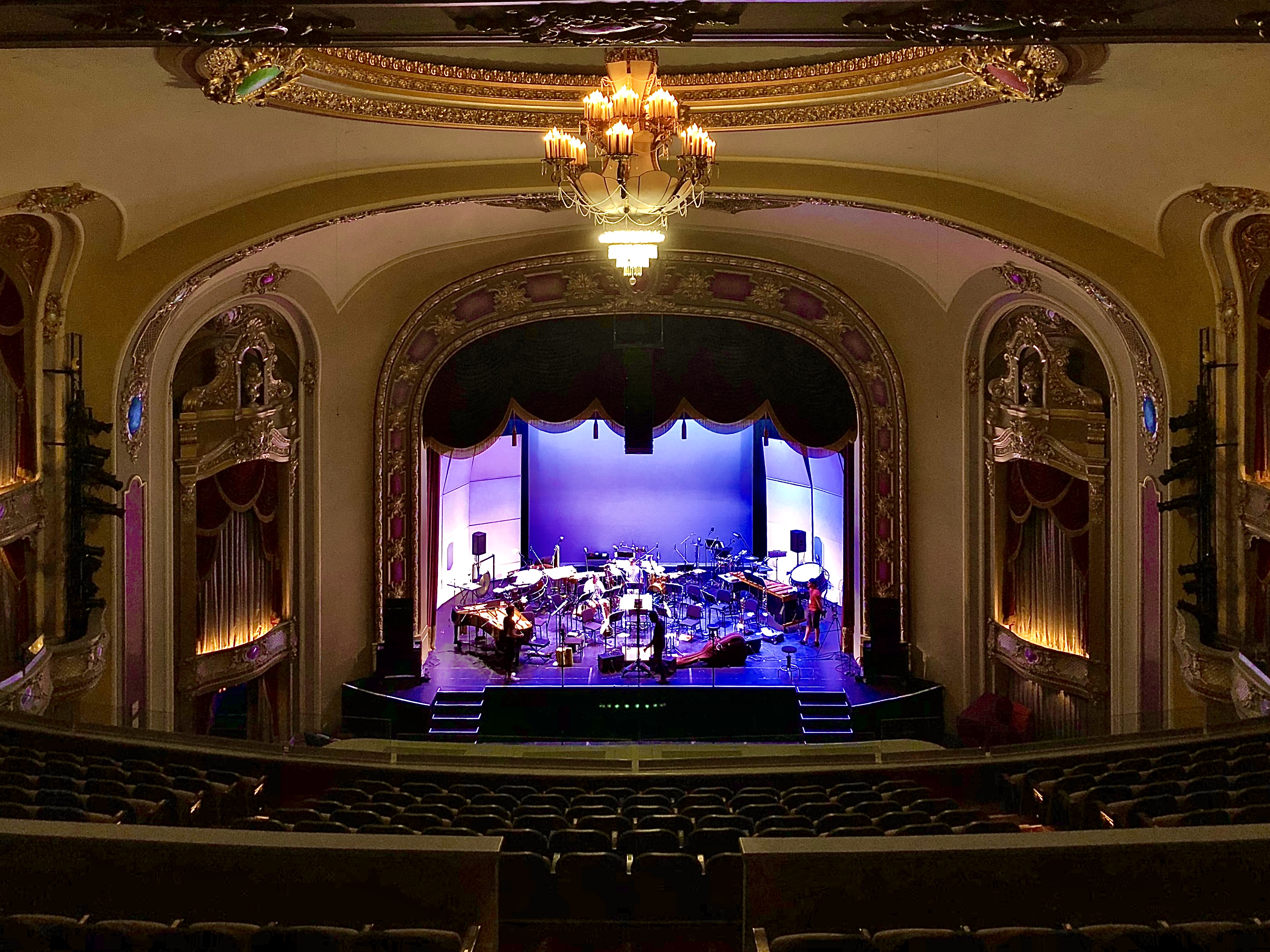
The stage set for a performance of Alarm Will Sound.

- MOSS Youth Orchestra
- MOSS Junior Strings
- MOSS Children's Choir
- University Concert Series
- University of Missouri School of Music
- Plowman Chamber Music Competition
- True/False Film Festival

== Sources ==
- O’Brien, Dianna Borsi (2021). Historic Movie Theaters of Columbia Missouri. Charleston, South Carolina: The History Press (Arcadia Publishing). pp. 76–92. ISBN 9781467146401.
