= William Henry Pommer =

American Composer

- Born: March 22, 1851; St. Louis, Missouri, U.S.
- Died: October 13, 1937 (aged 86) Columbia, Missouri, U.S.
- Education: Leipzig Royal Conservatory; Vienna Conservatory
- Genre: Classical music
- Occupations: Composer, educator
- Instruments: Piano, organ

William Henry Pommer (March 22, 1851–October 13, 1937) was an American composer and educator, best remembered for his contributions to music education in St. Louis.

== Early life and education ==
Pommer was born in St. Louis, Missouri, to a family of German immigrants who manufactured musical instruments, first in Philadelphia then in Hermann, Missouri. His grandmother built the Pommer-Gentner House in Deutschheim State Historic Site. His early music studies in St. Louis were with Bernhard August Bode and piano with Eduard Sobolewski.

In 1872, Pommer he left for studies in Europe. He studied for two years at the Leipzig Royal Conservatory with Carl Reinecke and Ernst Richter, and for a year in Vienna at the Imperial Conservatory, where he studied with Victor Rokitauski and organ and counterpoint with Anton Bruckner. He had an audience with Liszt, though Liszt was unimpressed.

== Career ==
Upon his return to St. Louis, Pommer began to compose and privately teach. Most of his 500+ compositions were written in this early period, before focusing on his pedagogical career.

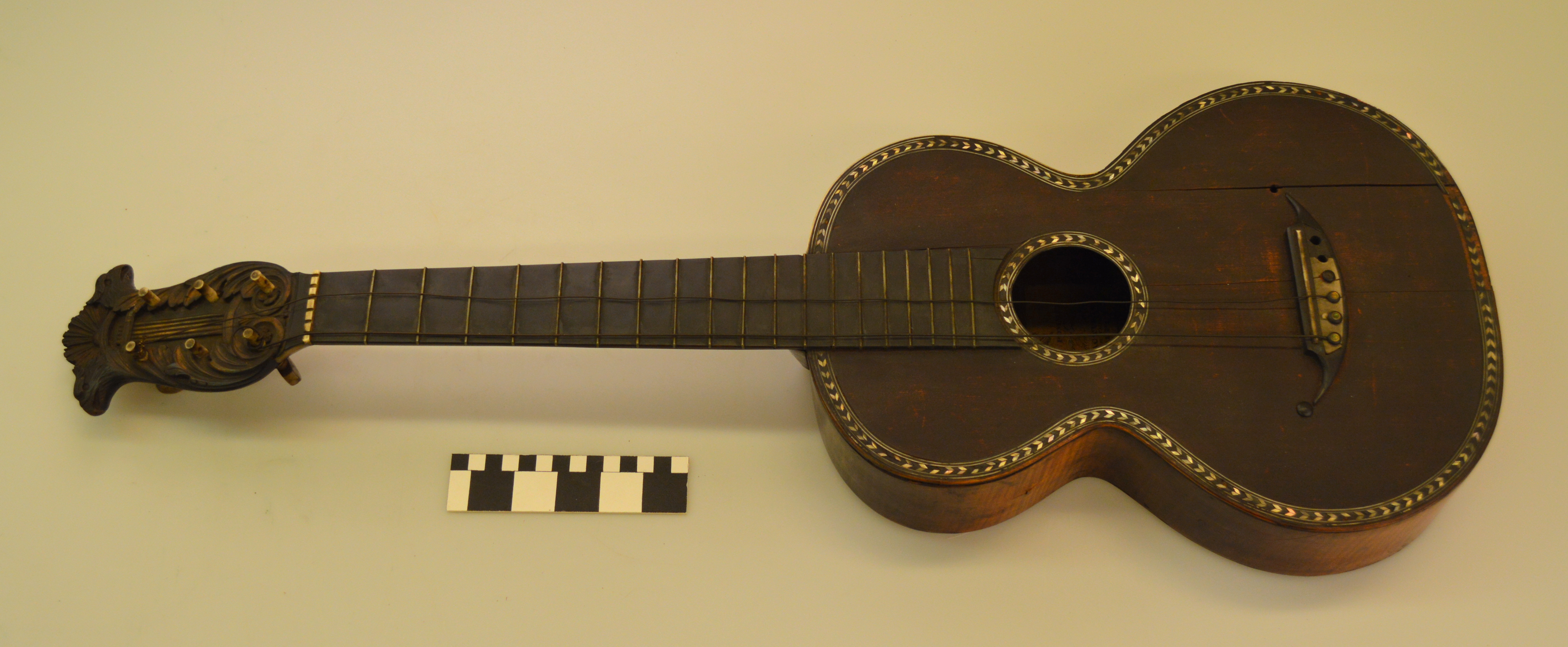
A guitar made by the Pommer family in the 1830s

From 1883 to 1887, Pommer was director of music at the progressive women's Christian College (now known as Columbia College). He returned to private teaching until 1890, when he was appointed choirmaster for Smith Academy.

He left Smith Academy after 10 years to become music supervisor of the St. Louis Public High School System. During his tenure, Pommer assembled a chorus of 4000 school children from the high school system to perform at the 31st National Saengerfest in St. Louis. During this time, he was active in the Missouri State Music Teachers Association, and was elected its president in 1900. He was also involved in the musical festivities for the 1904 World's Fair, planning, judging, and having his compositions performed.

In 1907, Richard Jesse appointed Pommer as Assistant Professor of music at the University of Missouri. He immediately set to growing the university's music department, founding a chapter of Phi Mu Alpha Sinfonia, growing the music class catalog, procuring instruments, giving lectures and concerts, and touring with the university's Guitar and Mandolin club. By 1914, the music department was able to offer a two-year degree in music education, and by 1917 a bachelor of arts degree in music. He fought for the university to grant course credit for applied music lessons, and helped spread this notion to other colleges and high schools. His department eventually grew to become the University of Missouri School of Music.

== Personal life ==
Pommer retired in 1922, and continued to live in Columbia until his death in 1937.

== Selected compositions ==
- Gondoliera for piano and cello
- Five Pieces for Violin and Piano
- String Quartet in G minor
- The Fountain of Youth, comic opera
- St. Etheldethelwethelberga, opera
- The Student's Mother Goose, a setting of fifty nursery rhymes
