= Missouri Symphony =

Orchestra in Columbia, Missouri

Missouri Symphony Orchestra
- Orchestra
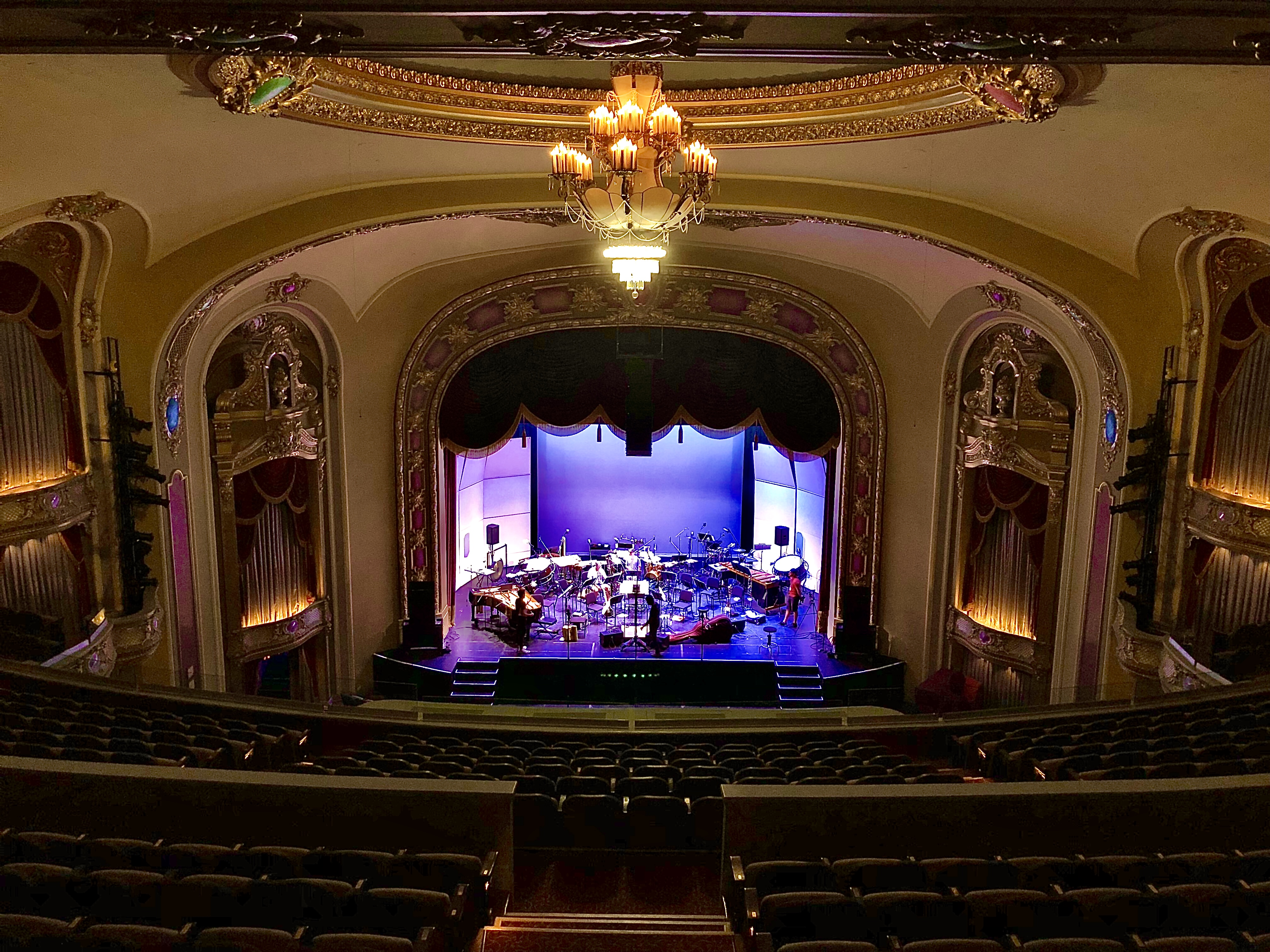
- Missouri Theatre home of the Missouri Symphony
- Former name: Missouri Symphony Society
- Founded: 1970
- Concert hall: Missouri Theatre
- Music director: Wilbur Lin
- Website: www.themosy.org

The Missouri Symphony Orchestra is an American symphony orchestra based in Columbia, Missouri. Founded in 1970 as the Missouri Symphony Society the professional orchestra brings symphonic classics, pops, and guest artist to Mid-Missouri. The orchestra is best known for its "Hot Summer Nights" music series. Other annual events include the Symphony of Toys, Young People's Concert, and Joy of Music Summer camp. The symphony also performs around Missouri including the Lake of the Ozarks.

== History ==
From its founding in 1970 to 1998 the orchestra was conducted by Hugo Vianello. In 2000, Kirk Trevor became music director. Trevor's final season is 2021. Taiwanese-American conductor Wilbur Lin was appointed the music director designate in 2022 and assumed the role in 2023.
