= Avenue of the Columns =

Coordinates: 38.951561°N 92.328638°W

8th Street, more commonly known as the Avenue of the Columns, is an urban street in downtown Columbia, Missouri. It connects the University of Missouri and Francis Quadrangle to the Boone County Court House and the Columbia City Hall. The avenue has long symbolized "town and gown" in this Midwestern college town. Sitting in the center of Francis Quad on the south are the 6 ionic columns of the former Academic Hall, aligned with these on the north are the 4 doric columns of the former Boone County Courthouse. William Jewell, the first mayor of Columbia, is said to be responsible for this decision. The domed Jesse Hall and its corinthian columns are also in the alignment. The street is also home to the Tiger Hotel, the Guitar Building, and the offices of the Columbia Missourian. Civic planning efforts have focused on in-fill development and beautification. In 2014, it became the center of a controversy over the decision to build single-use student housing despite mixed-use and ground floor retail being the focus of community planning. In 5 blocks, the street crosses two National Register of Historic Places districts.

== Gallery ==
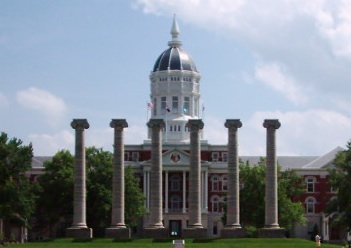
Jesse Hall and the columns on Francis Quadrangle

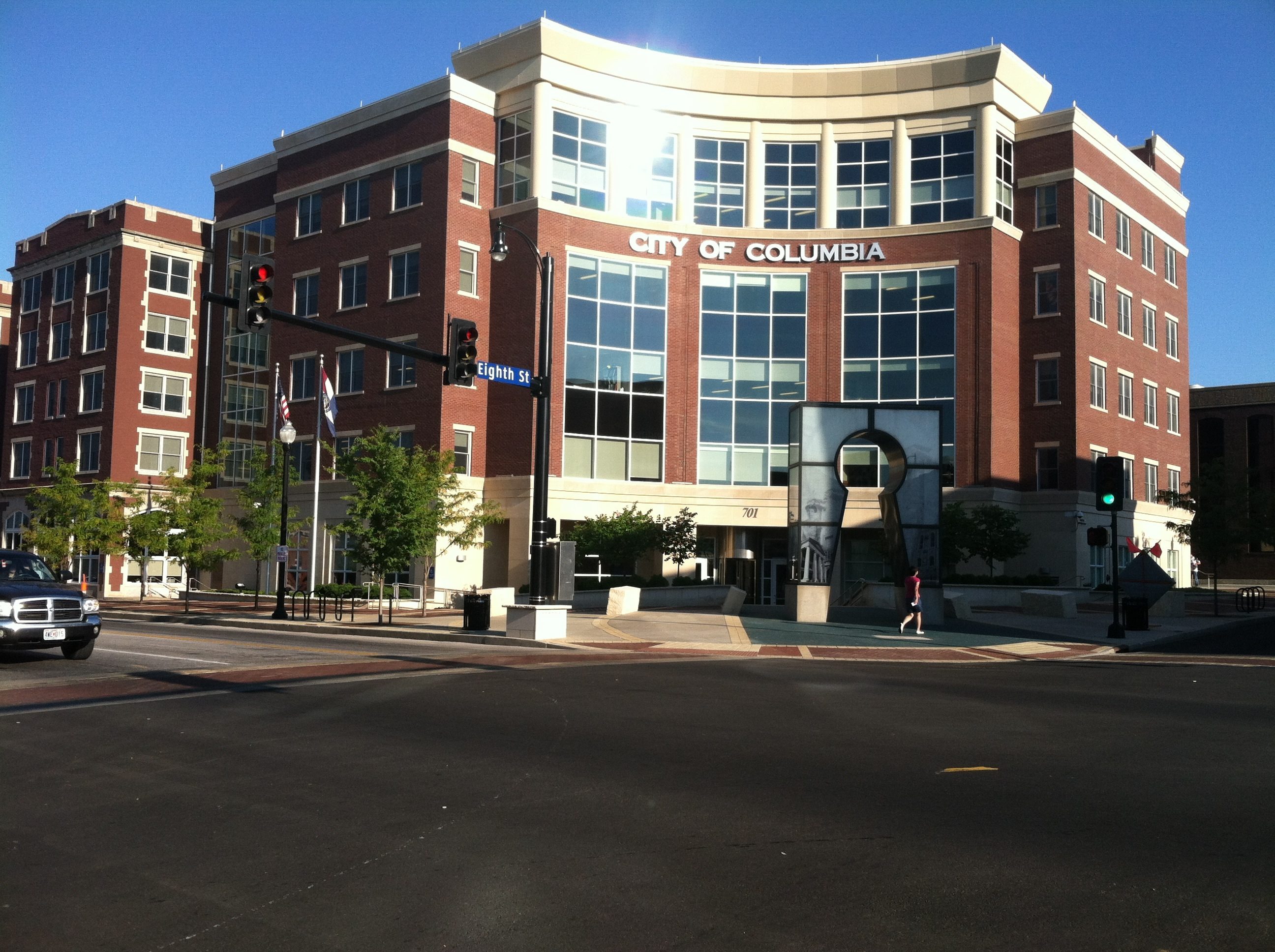
Columbia City Hall

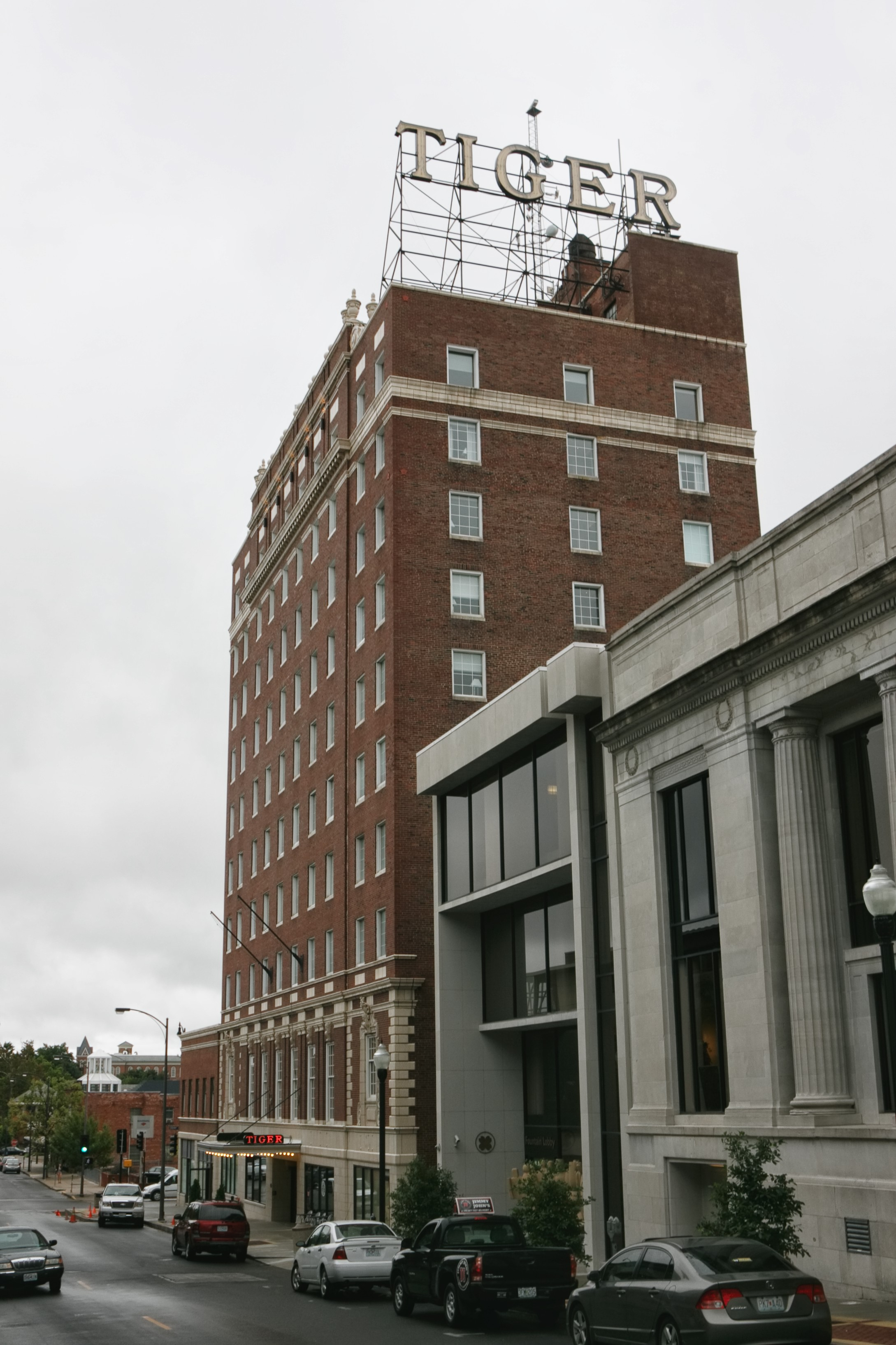
Tiger Hotel

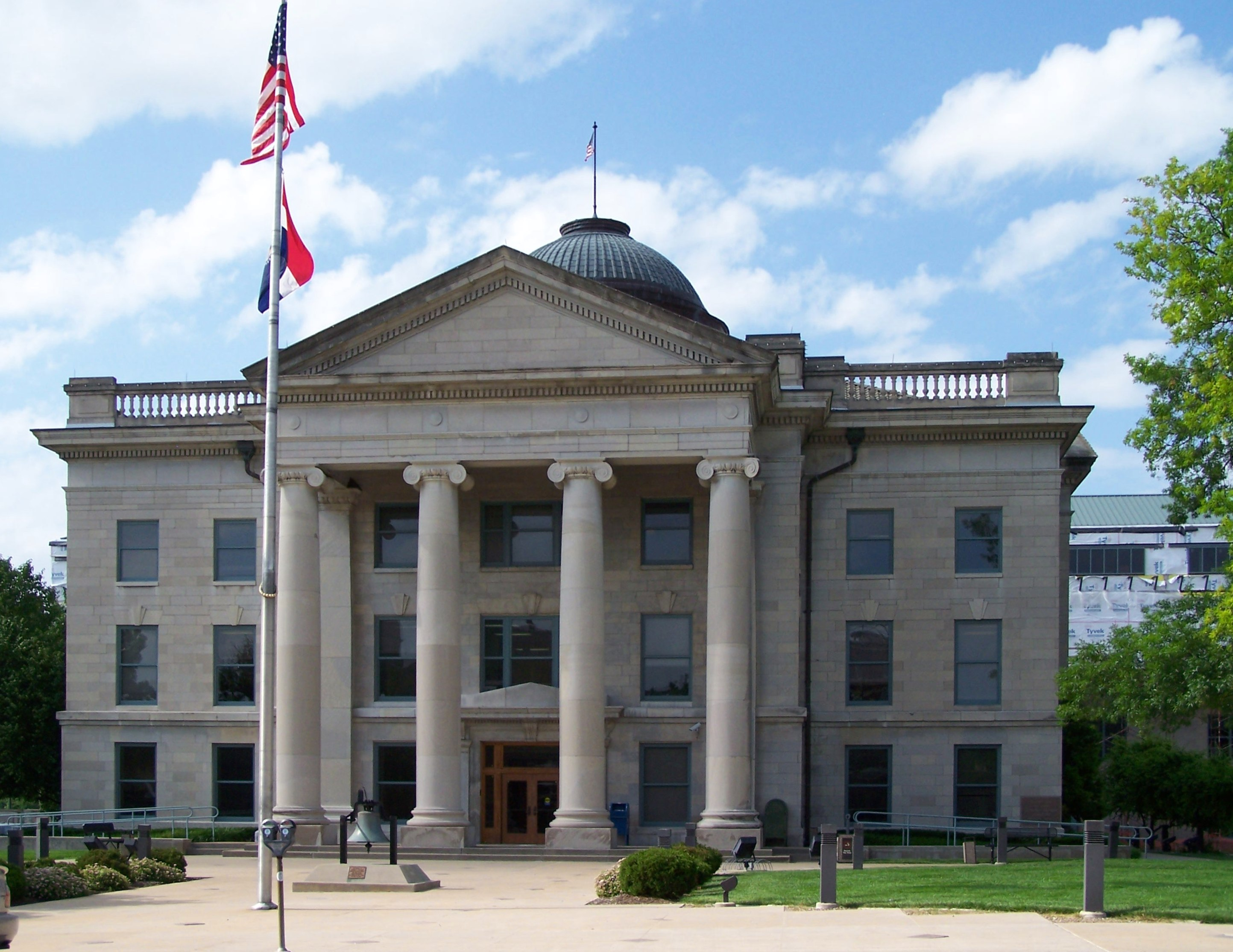
Boone County Courthouse

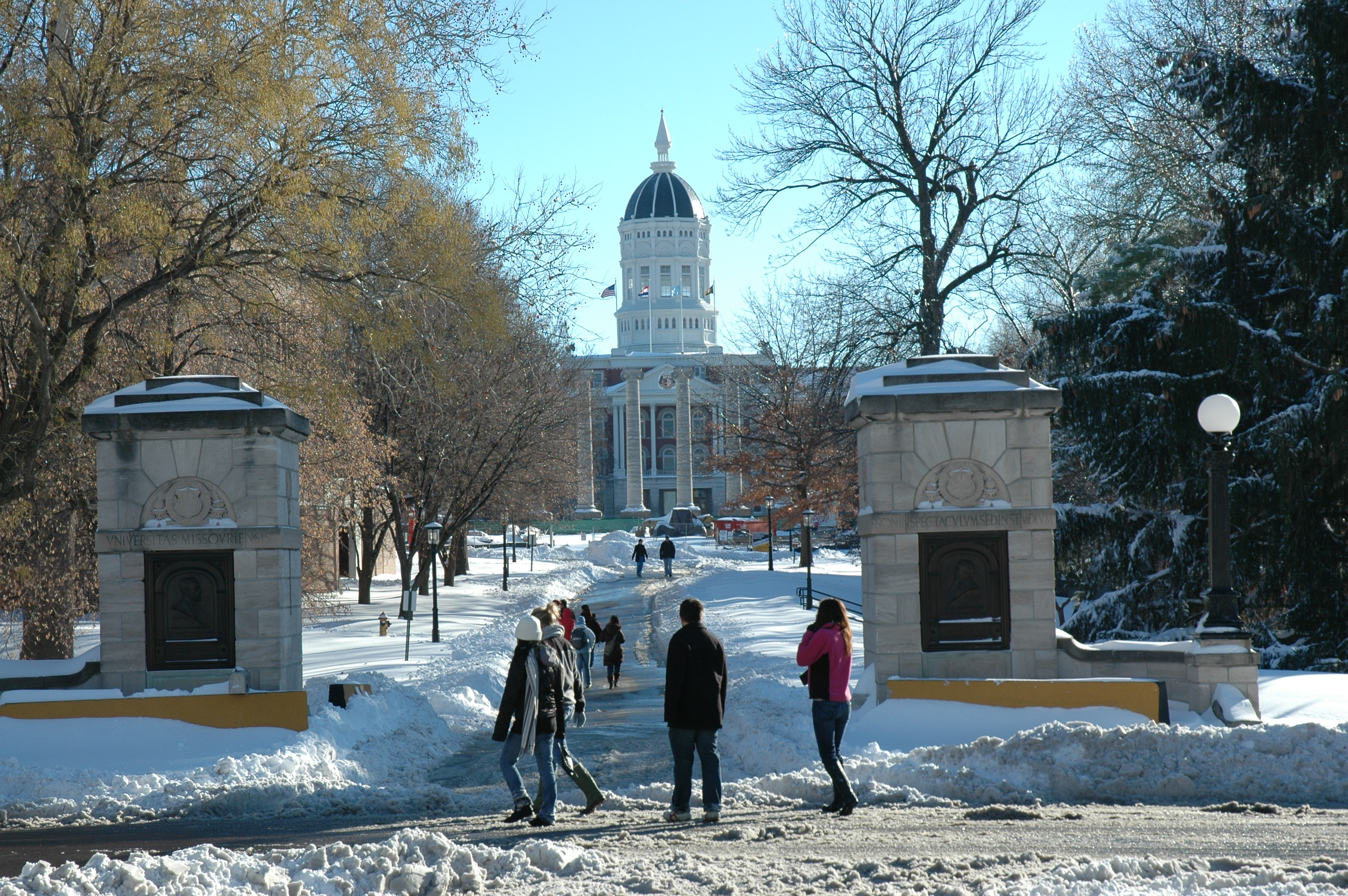
Jesse Hall seen from the Avenue of the Columns

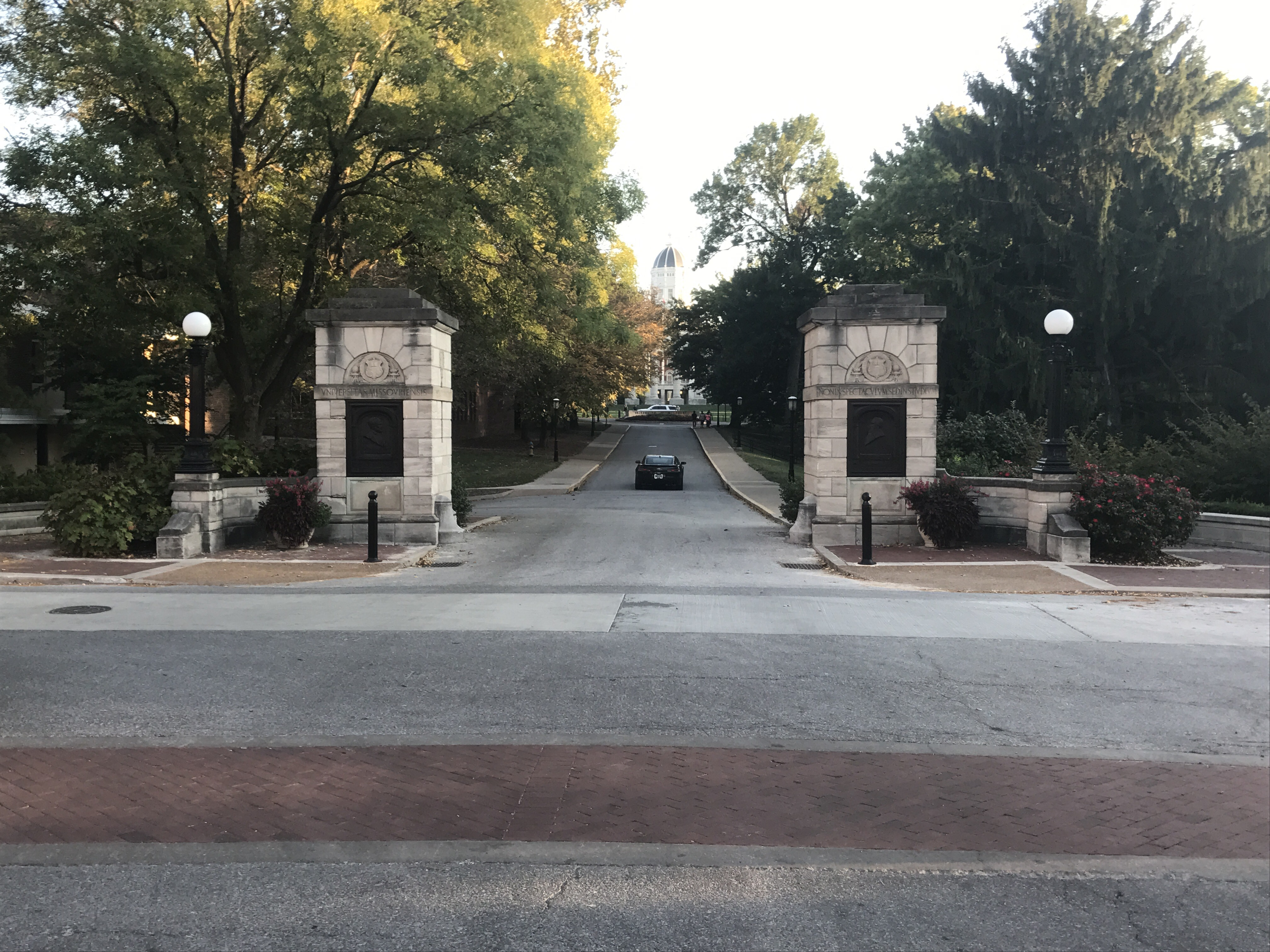
The Memorial Gateway in September 2017

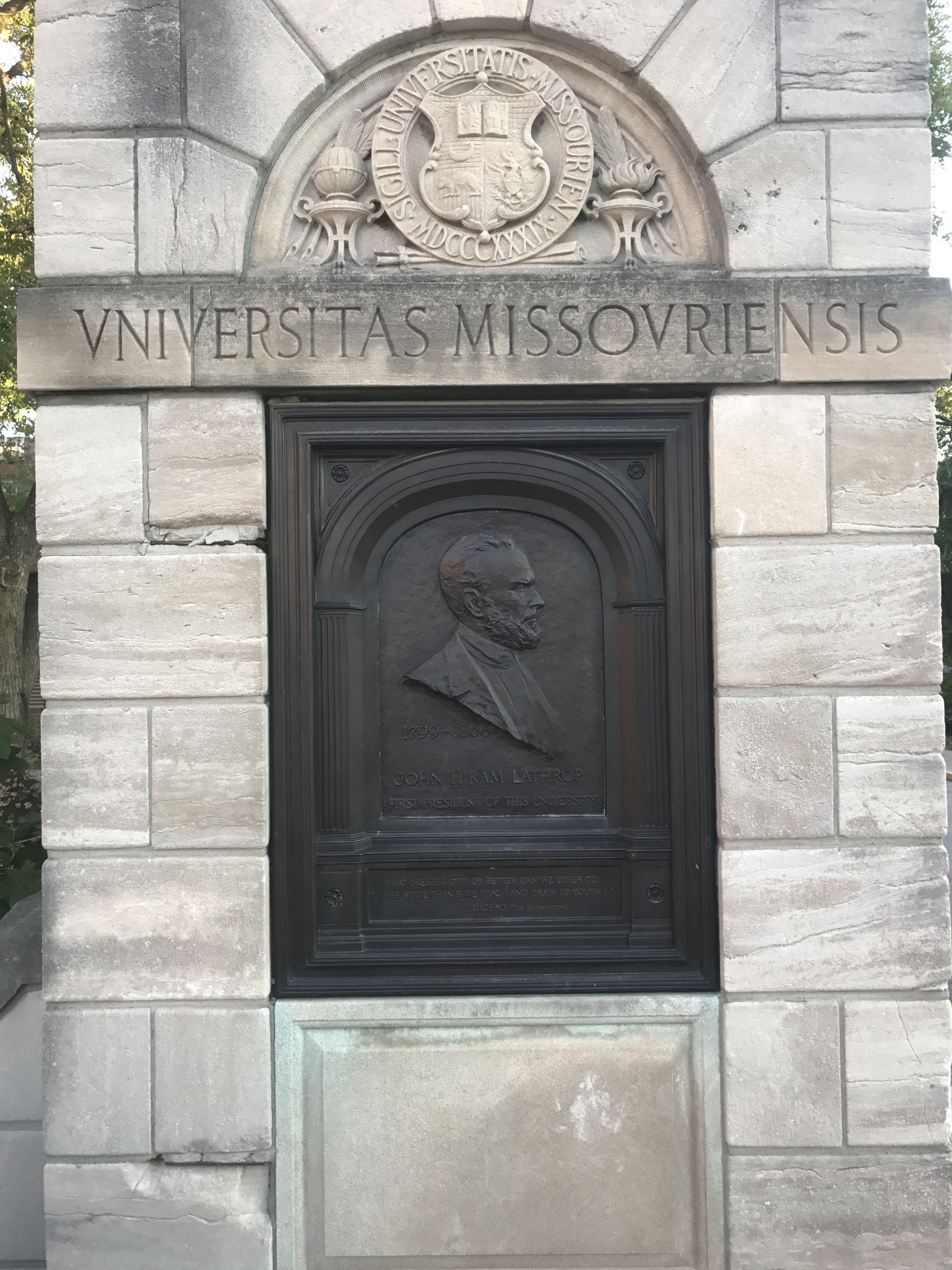
Bronze plaque of John Lathrop first president of the University

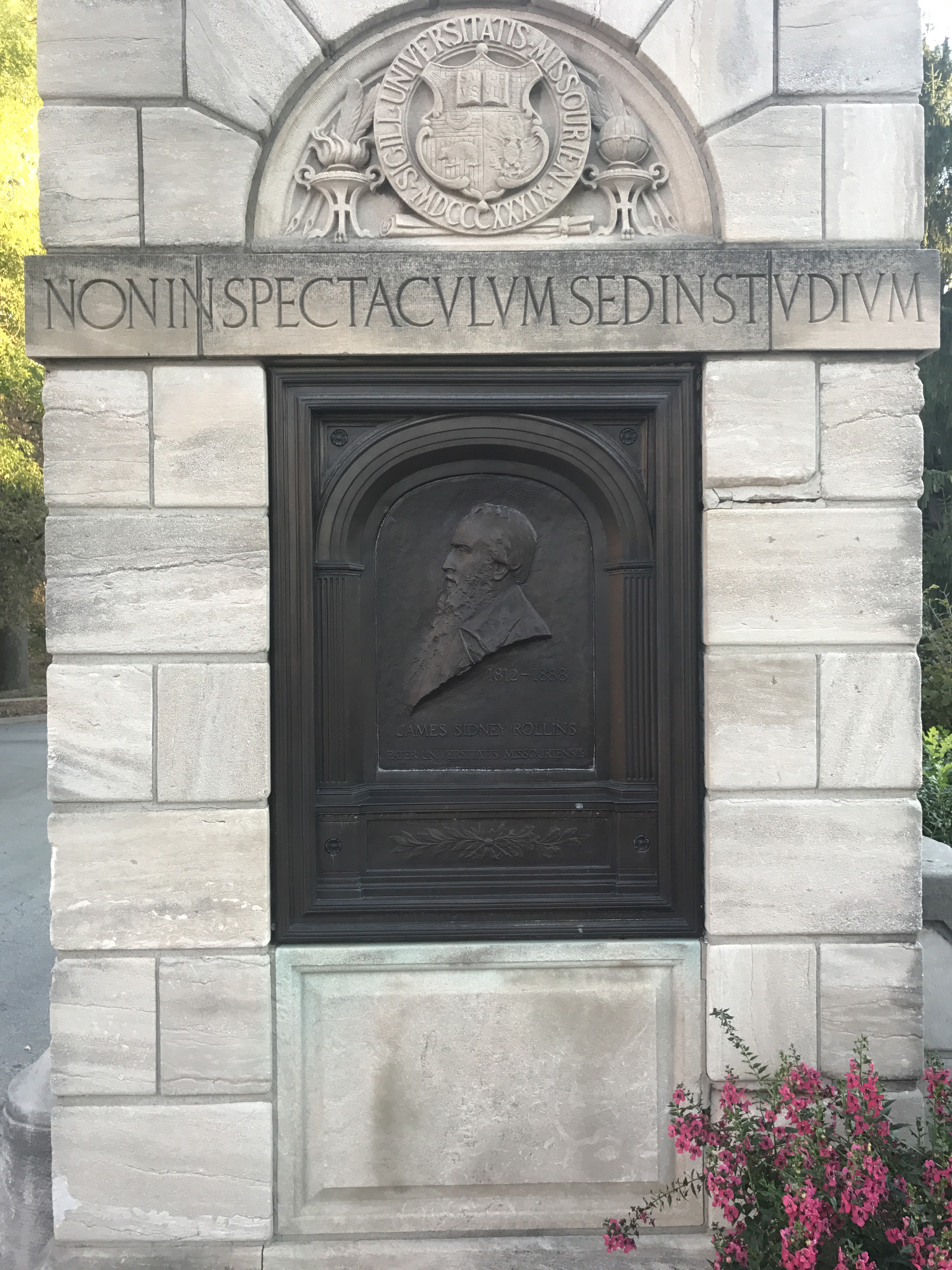
Bronze plaque of James Rollins father the University
