= Missouri Governor's Mansion =

Historic house in Missouri, United States

- U.S. National Register of Historic Places
- U.S. Historic district – Contributing property
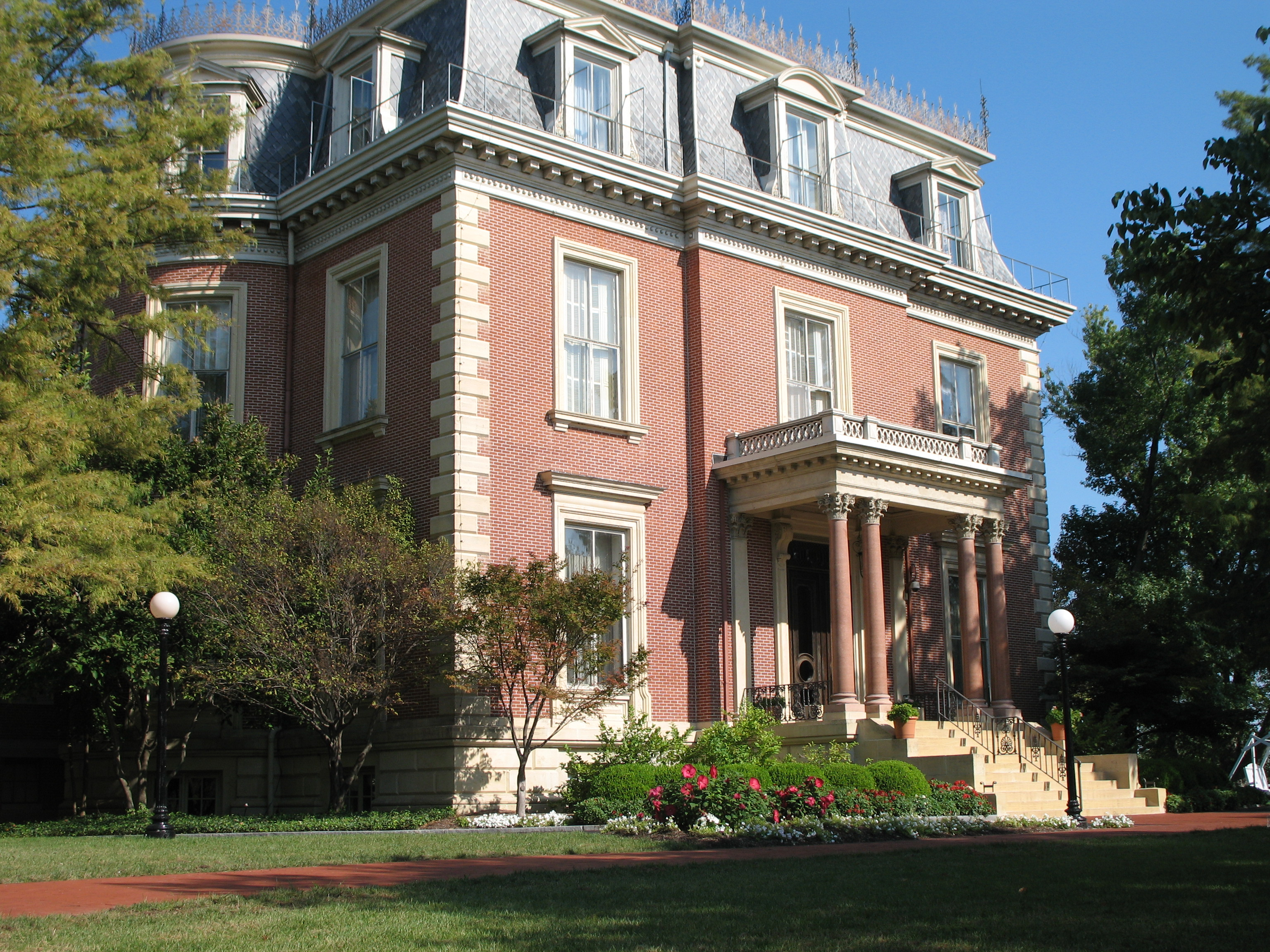

- Location within Missouri Location within the United States
- Location: 100 Madison St., Jefferson City, Missouri
- Coordinates: 38°34′40″N 92°10′10″W
- Built: 1871; 155 years ago
- Architect: George Ingham Barnett
- Architectural style: Second Empire
- NRHP reference No.: 69000095
- Added to NRHP: May 21, 1969; 57 years ago

The Missouri Governor's Mansion is a historic U.S. residence in Jefferson City, Missouri. It is located at 100 Madison Street. On May 21, 1969, it was added to the U.S. National Register of Historic Places. It is located in the Missouri State Capitol Historic District.

The current site on a bluff overlooking the Missouri River was the vicinity of the first Jefferson City Missouri State Capitol building from 1825 to 1837 after the capitol was relocated from St. Charles, Missouri to Jefferson City. The capitol burned in 1837 and was rebuilt at its current site a block to the west.

The current Neo-Renaissance structure was built in 1871 at a cost of $75,000 and has served every governor since. It was renovated extensively during the administration of Governor Kit Bond in the 1980s.

== History ==
=== First mansion ===
Prior to the relocation of the state capital to Jefferson City, the first governors who were from the St. Louis, Missouri/St. Charles, Missouri area lived in their private homes and if the need arose they rented homes in St. Charles.

The first Jefferson City governor's mansion also doubled as the home for the Missouri General Assembly, with the Missouri House of Representatives meeting on the ground floor, the Missouri State Senate on the second floor and the governor living in two rooms.

The structure, which was 60 by 40 feet (12 m), was completed in November 1826 at a cost of $20,000. The building was designed by Stephen Hills and was modeled on the first Pennsylvania State Capitol in Harrisburg, Pennsylvania. Hill later designed Academic Hall at the University of Missouri (of which now remains only the landmark columns on the Francis Quadrangle.

=== Second mansion ===
Missouri's second governor Daniel Dunklin, after being elected in 1832, refused to move his family to the building. Construction of a new $5,000 mansion began in the autumn of 1833 and was completed in 1834. It was at the end of the same block as the original mansion/capitol. It had dimensions of 48 by 30 feet (9.1 m) and a portico with four. The building survived the November 15, 1837 fire that destroyed the neighboring capitol when wet blankets were applied to the roof of the mansion.

The mansion suffered a fire in the 1840s during the administration of Thomas Reynolds. Reynolds killed himself in the mansion in 1844. A sofa with pineapple-shaped legs belonging to Reynolds is now one of the oldest pieces of furniture in the current mansion.

Governor Robert Marcellus Stewart initiated a campaign to build a new residence. Stewart rode a horse up the steps into the house and ordered a servant to feed it a peck of oats. Stewart also pardoned all the women in the state prison and had them work in the mansion. The General Assembly allocated $20,000 for a new mansion but, the American Civil War interrupted the plan.

=== Current mansion ===
After B. Gratz Brown assumed office in 1871, several people said they would not come to large gatherings at the mansion because they feared disaster. In March 1871, the Assembly allocated $50,000 for a new mansion. George Ingham Barnett (whose work includes most of the buildings at the Missouri Botanical Garden built for Henry Shaw) was the architect.

Major exterior features of the 66-foot-6-inch (20.27 m) square, three-story red brick building are the 13-foot (4.0 m) mansard roof and four pink granite columns from Brown's quarry in Iron County, Missouri.

The most striking interior feature is the Grand Stairway carved of walnut.

The first of the major renovations occurred in the 1890s under Governor David Rowland Francis; they included painting the bricks deep red to cover soot stains.

The next major renovation occurred under Lloyd C. Stark in which $55,000 was allocated to replace the columns supporting the Grand Stairway with steel brackets. The exterior was painted white and the Starks donated 3,000 plants from their nursery.

During Kit Bond’s administration in the 1980s, the mansion was renovated extensively in an attempt to restore it to an 1871 appearance including the addition of Renaissance Revival style of furniture and restoration of the pink brick exterior.

== Tours ==
Free guided tours are provided by volunteer docents. The Missouri Governor's Mansion tours are open April through mid-May. Reservations can be made through the Missouri State Parks website.
