= The Columns (Columbia, Missouri) =

- U.S. Historic district – Contributing property
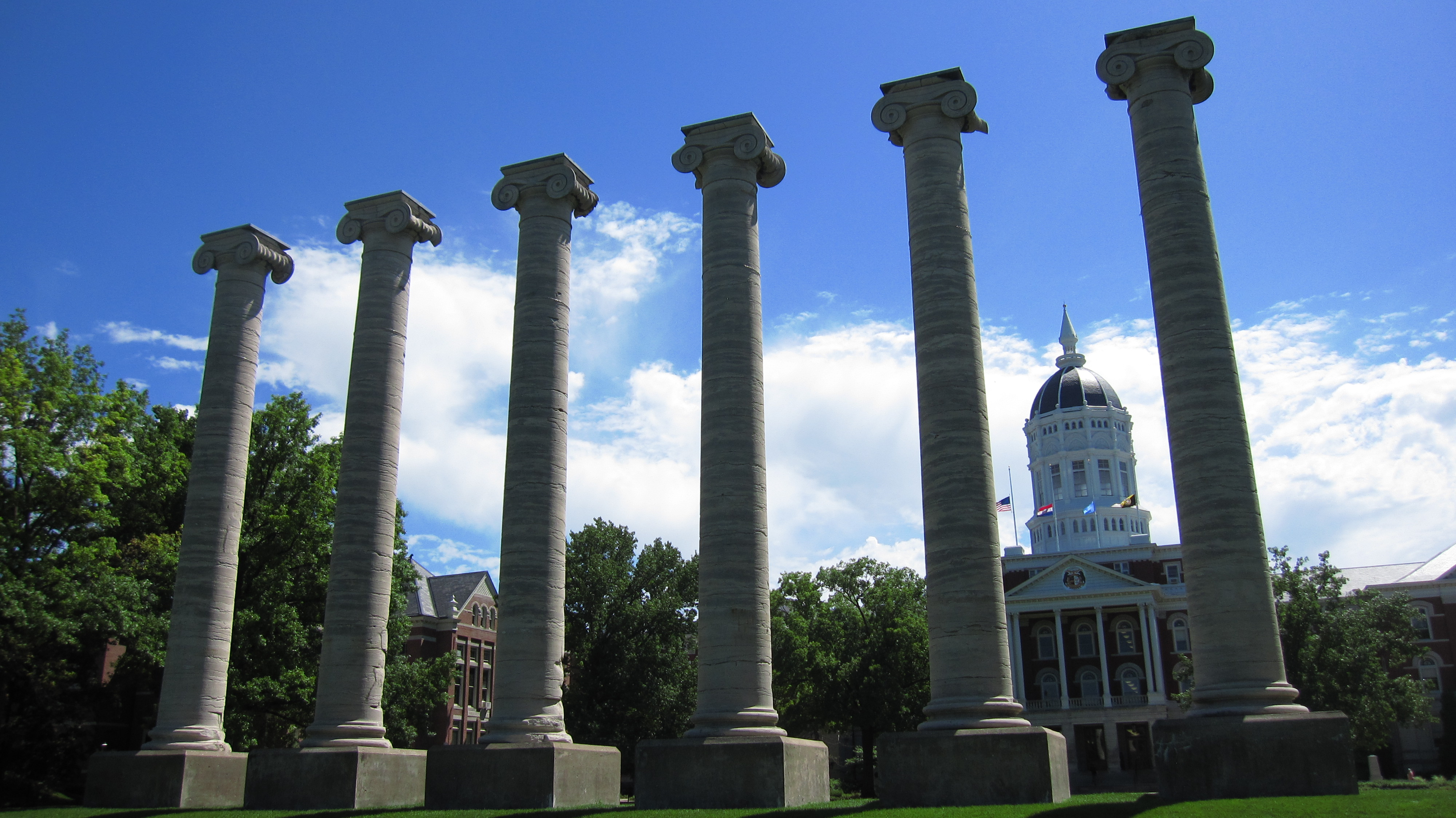
- The six Ionic columns in front of Jesse Hall

- Location within Missouri Location within the United States
- Location: Columbia, Missouri
- Coordinates: 38°56′47″N 92°19′44″W
- Built: 1840–1843
- Architect: Stephen Hills
- Architectural style: Classical Revival
- Part of: Francis Quadrangle Historic District (ID73001036)
- Added to NRHP: December 18, 1973

The Columns are a landmark of the University of Missouri in Columbia, Missouri. Standing 43 feet (13 m) tall in the center of Francis Quadrangle and at the south end of the Avenue of the Columns, they are the remains of the portico of Academic Hall. Along with Jesse Hall, they are one of the most photographed sites in Missouri. The Columns have been at the center of many traditions and events including graduations, concerts, pranks, weddings, and protests. Mizzou's school song mentions the columns. They are a contributing structure to the Francis Quadrangle National Historic District. The columns underwent preservation work in 2017.

== History ==
Academic Hall was constructed in 1840–1843 as the first building of the University of Missouri and the first public university building west of the Mississippi River. Accountant and architect Stephen Hills, who also designed the first Missouri State Capitol Building, designed the hall. The hall's columns were made from limestone drums from the Hinkson Creek Valley south of the campus. When Academic Hall burned to the ground in 1892, the columns remained standing.

In the next few months after the fire, many people thought that the Columns were an eyesore that blocked the view of the new buildings (Red Campus) being constructed on the Quadrangle. Some worried that they were structurally unsound and a safety hazard. Gideon F. Rothwell, the university's president, had ordered two mule teams to pull down and remove the Columns. However, citizens protested, with a fistfight between Rothwell and one Jerry S. Dorsey reportedly occurring. Rothwell later changed his mind, and The Columns stayed.

Dorsey obtained a judicial writ that halted the immediate destruction of the Columns, and an architect said they would be structurally sound. The protest from Columbia citizens and the reassurance that the Columns did not pose a safety hazard led Rothwell and the other curators to have a change of heart in December 1893, and the Columns remained.

In 2017, the columns underwent a major preservation effort. In the 2017 fall semester, the university offered a class called "The Geology of the Columns".

== Traditions ==
At the beginning of the academic year, freshmen participate in Tiger Walk to symbolize their move from the wider community to the university by walking through the columns. Tap Day occurs under the columns, when the school's secret societies announce their new members.

== Appearances in art and literature ==
A mural of James S. Rollins and the Columns is located in the office of the Missouri Governor in the Missouri State Capitol. They are also featured in a monumental stained-glass window titled Missouri at Peace located in the Missouri House Chamber.

A mural by George Caleb Bingham depicting Academic Hall was destroyed when the same burned. Academic Hall and the Columns are also featured in murals in the Boone County Courthouse and the Columbia Municipal Court.

In John Williams' Stoner from 1965, the columns are described briefly.

== Gallery ==
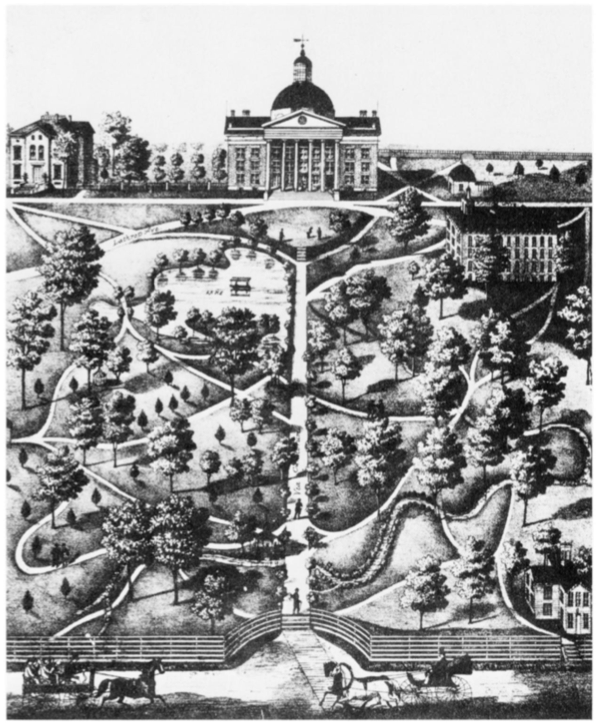
Drawing of Academic Hall, Switzler Hall, and the President's House around 1875

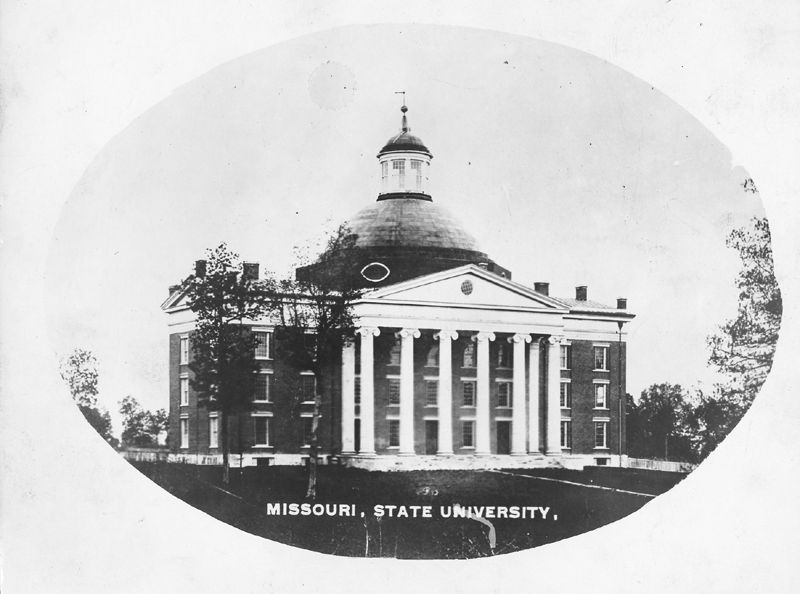
Academic Hall as it was originally constructed, sometime before 1885

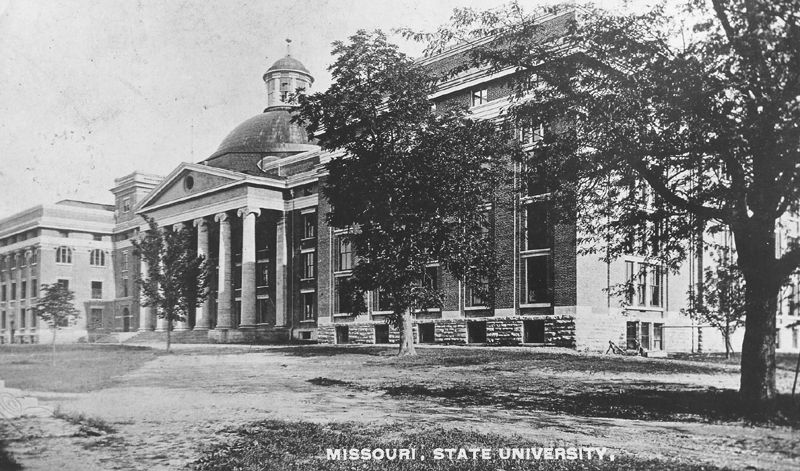
Academic Hall with the expanded east and west wings, perhaps in 1890-1892

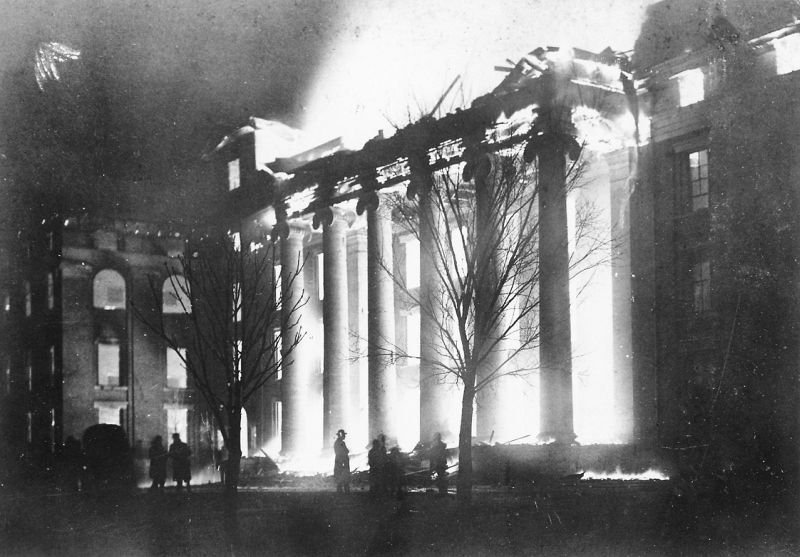
The burning of Academic Hall in 1892. Flame can be seen licking the columns of the portico

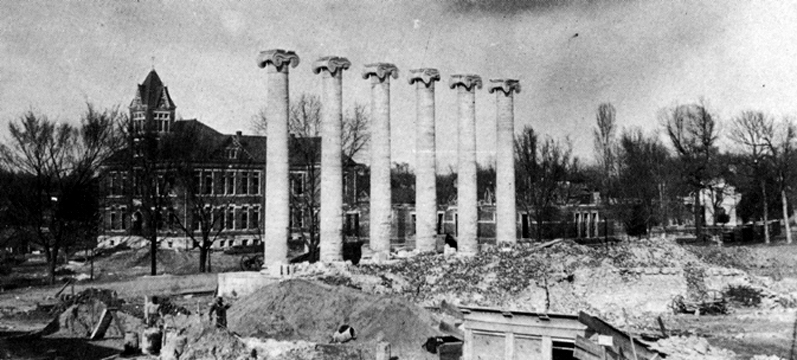
The Columns stand in the rubble of Academic Hall after the 1892 fire, the new buildings of Francis Quad in the background

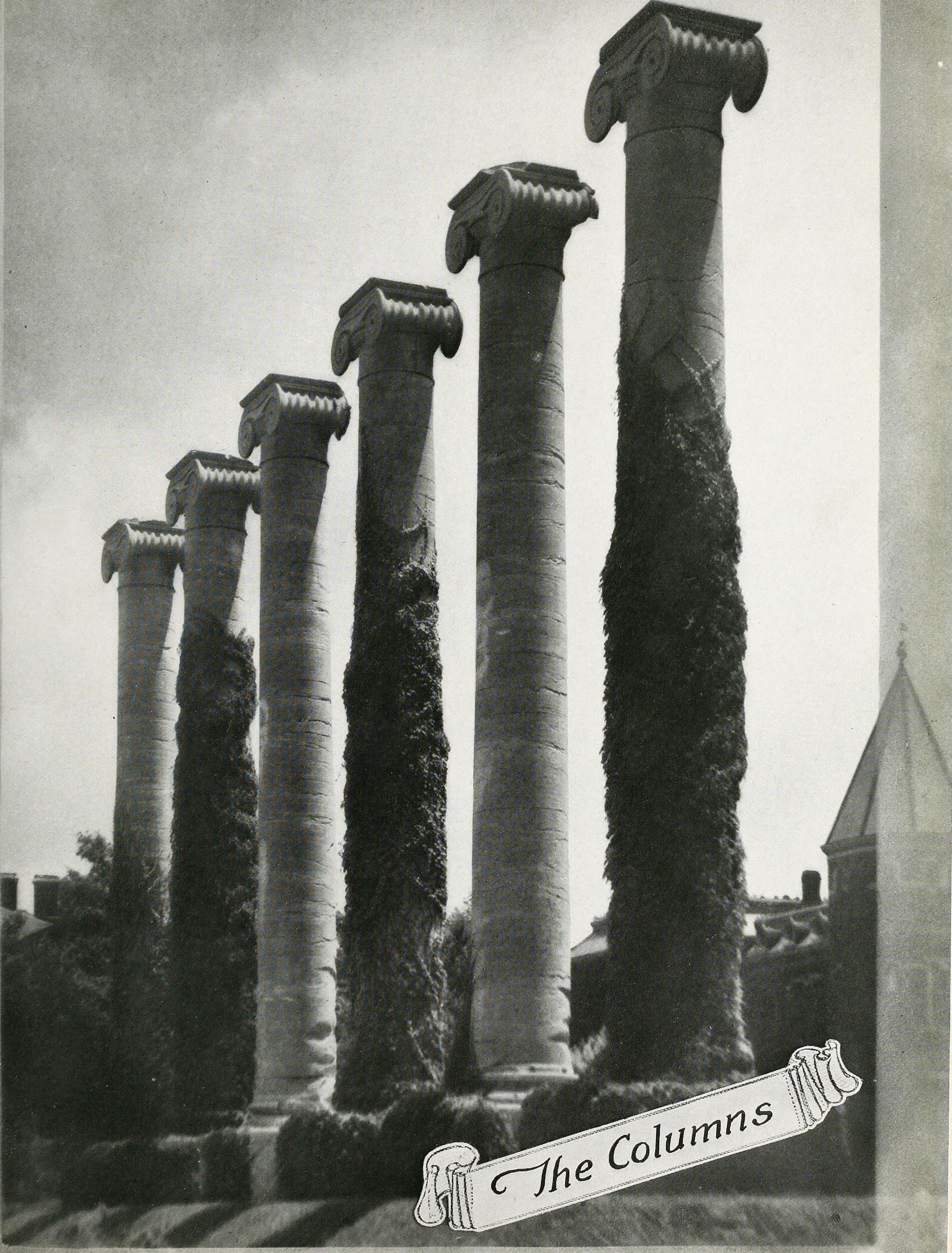
1922 Savitar yearbook picture of ivy covered Columns

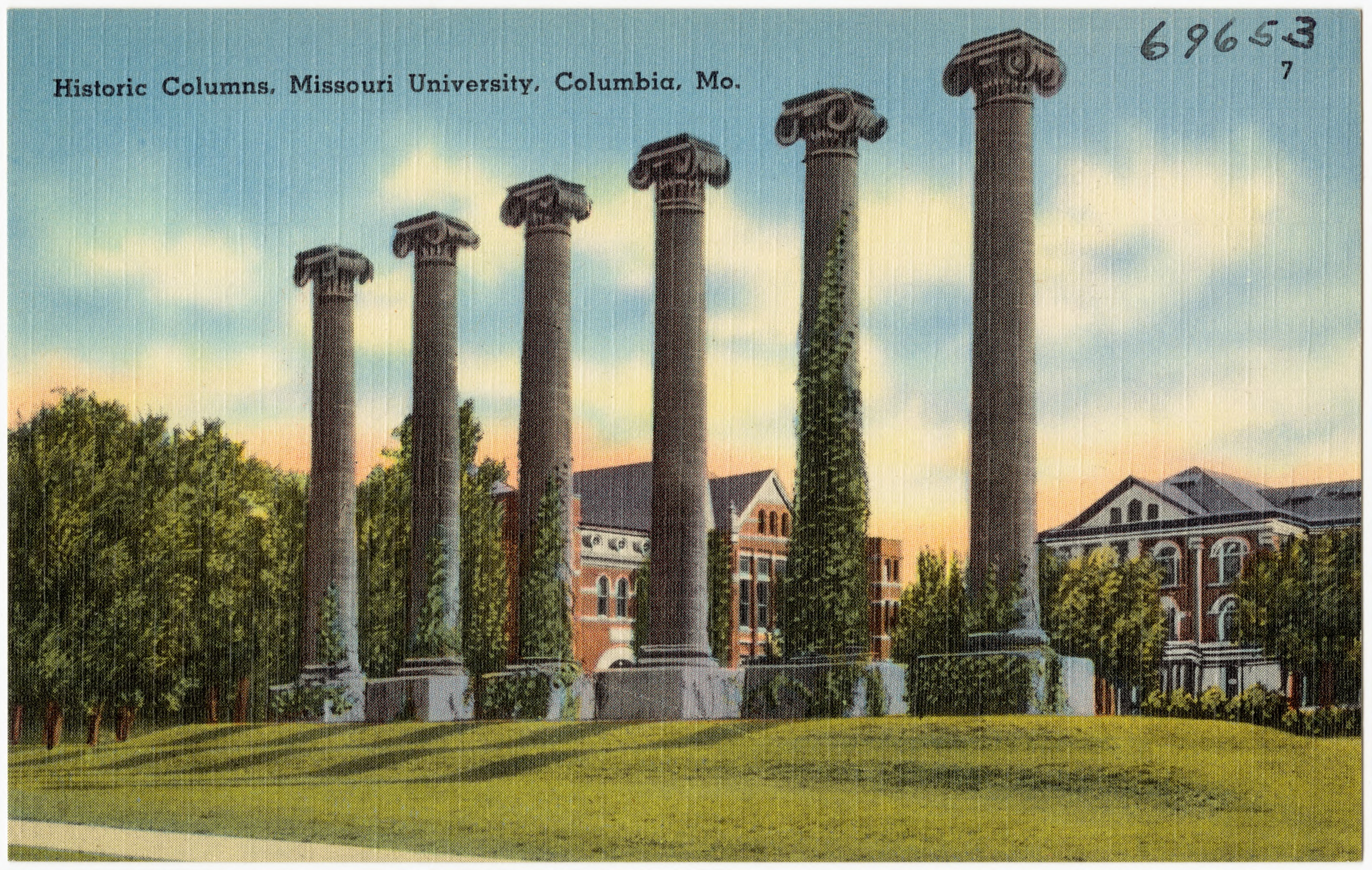
1930-45 postcard of the "Historic Columns Missouri University"

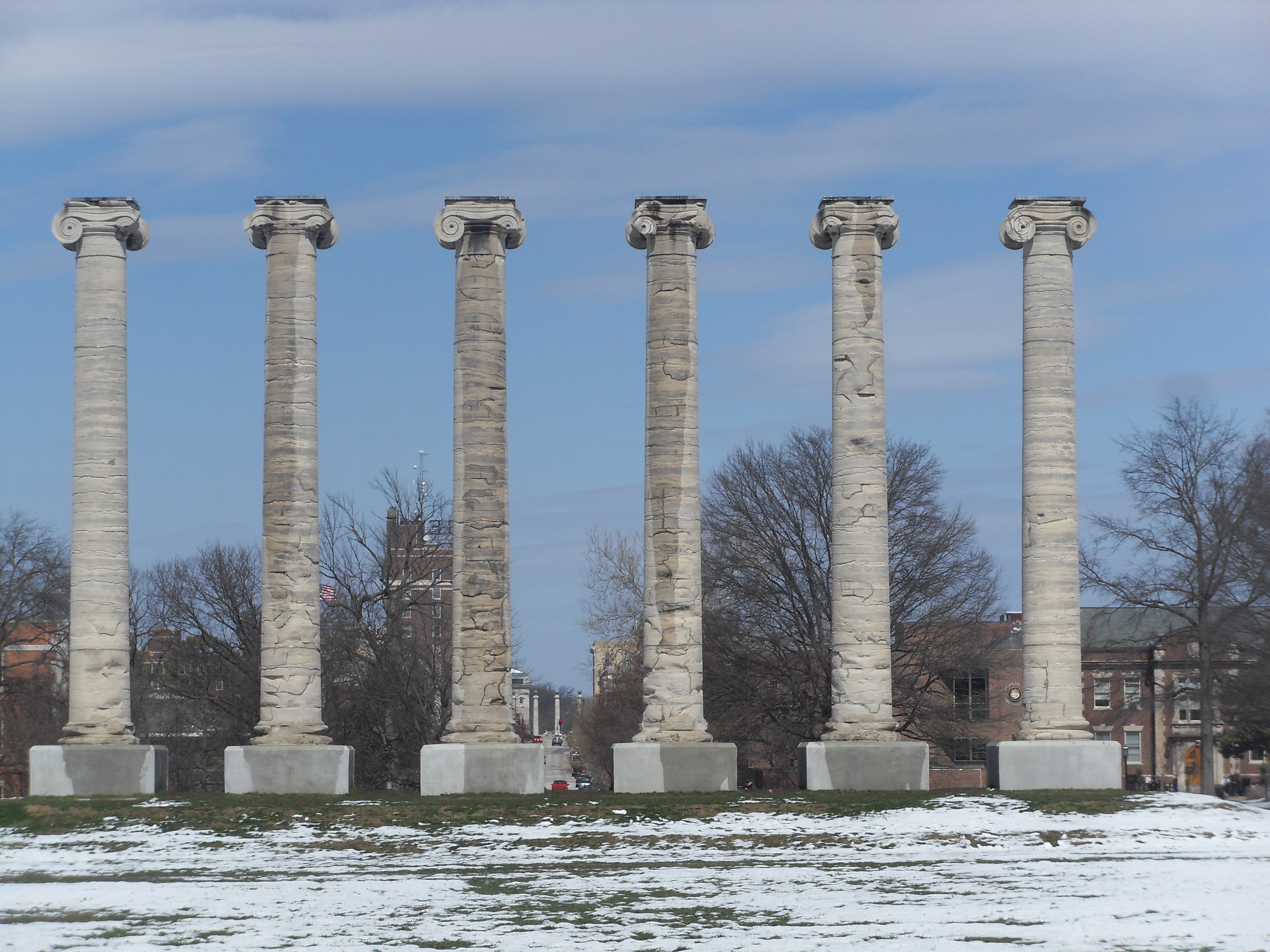
The Columns in the snow

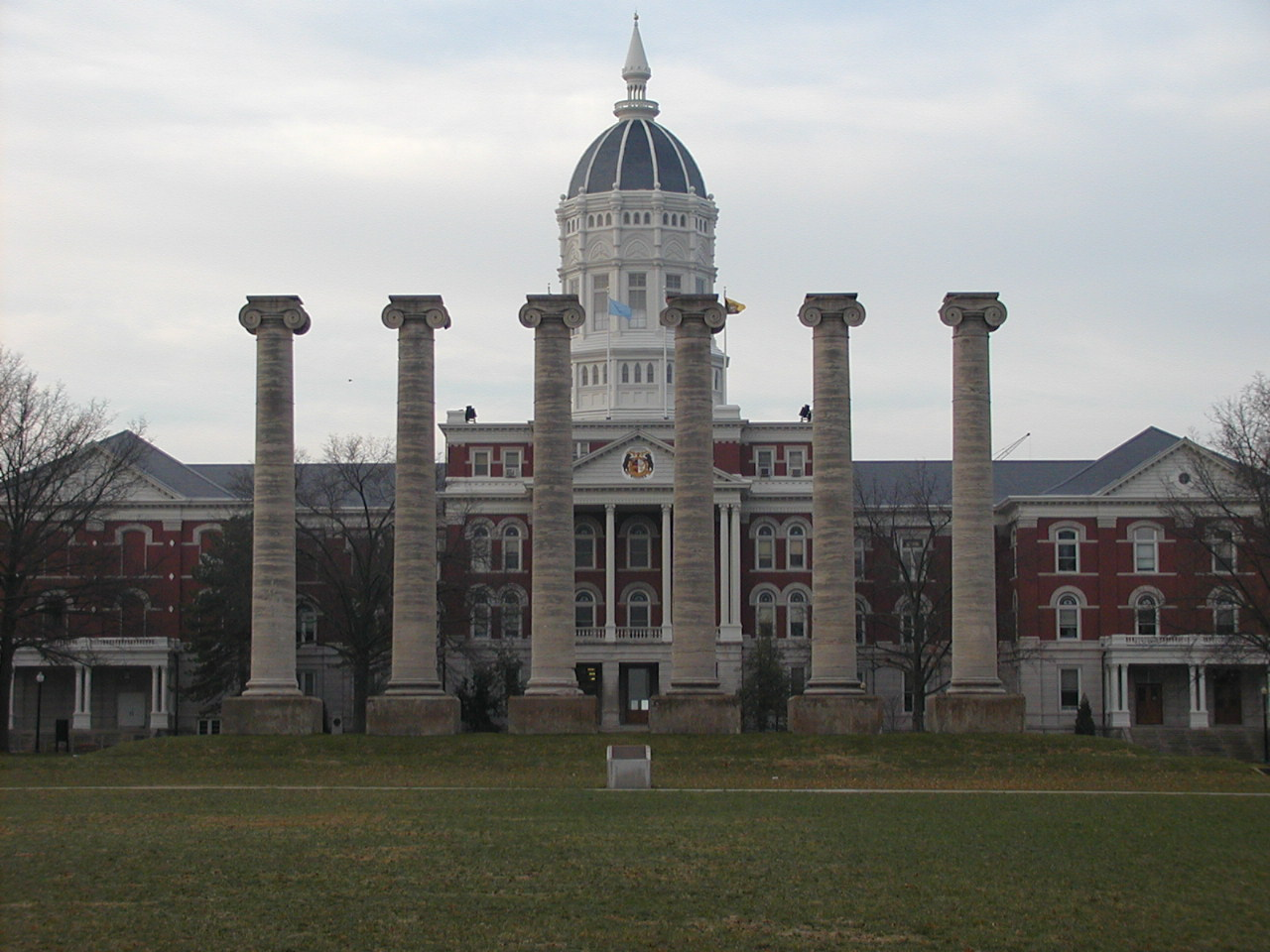
The Columns with Jesse Hall in the background

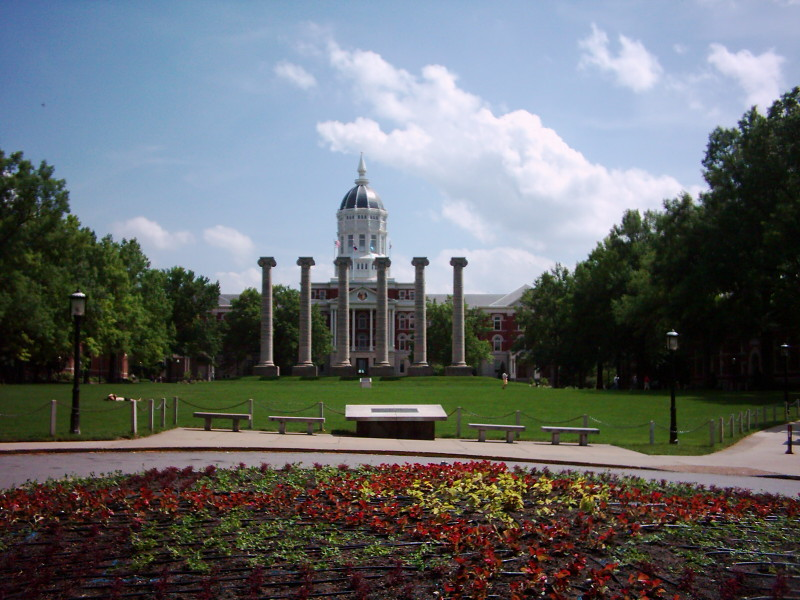
From the Avenue of the Columns

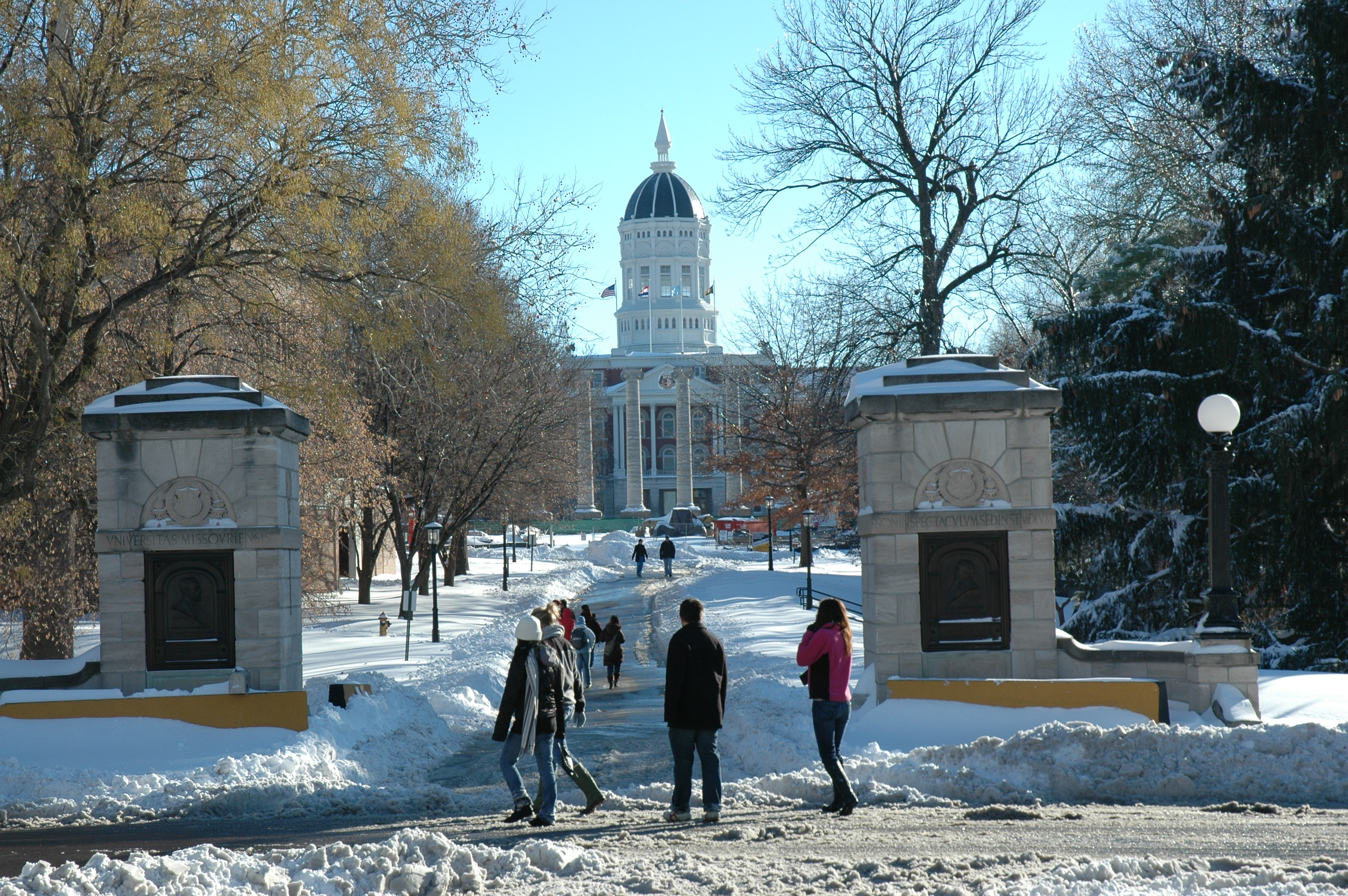
From Elm Street in snow

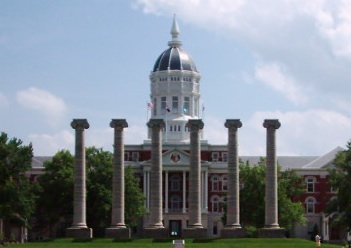
Jesse and the Columns

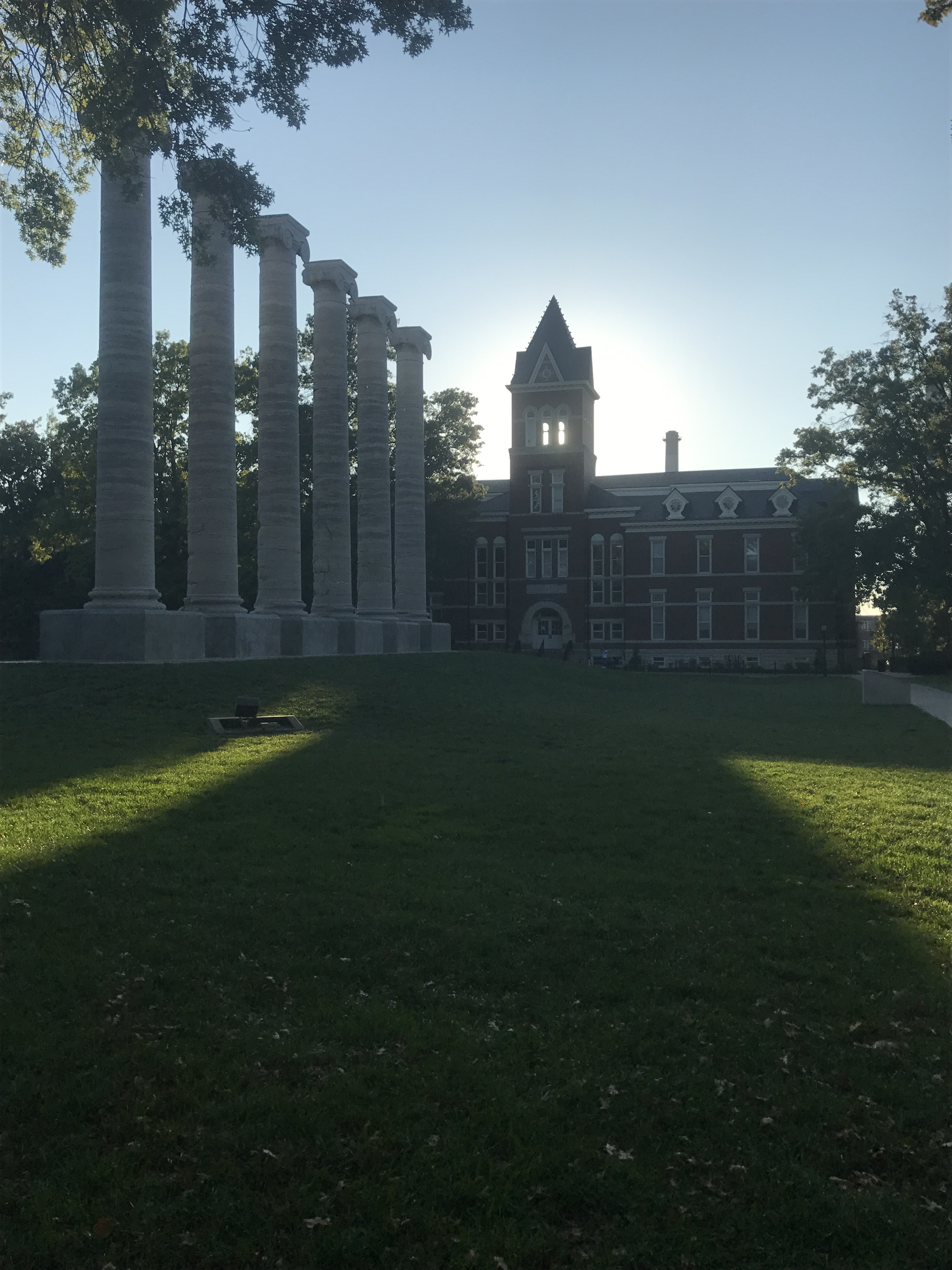
