= Joseph H. Burrows =

American politician (1840–1914)

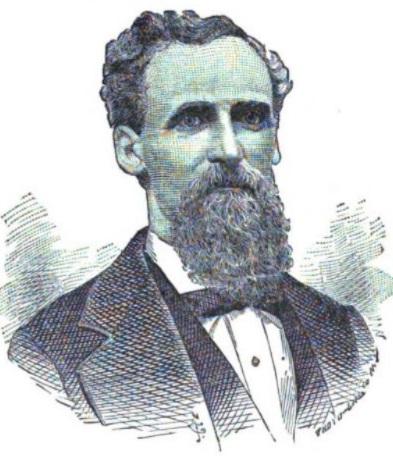
- From 1882's Public Men of To-Day

Member of the U.S. House of Representatives from Missouri's 10th district
- In office March 4, 1881 – March 3, 1883
- Preceded by: Gideon F. Rothwell
- Succeeded by: Martin L. Clardy

Member of the Missouri House of Representatives
- In office 1878–1880
- In office 1870–1874

Personal details
- Born: Joseph Henry Burrows; May 15, 1840 Manchester, England
- Died: April 28, 1914 (aged 73) Cainsville, Missouri, U.S.
- Resting place: Oak Lawn Cemetery
- Party: Greenback
- Profession: Politician

Joseph Henry Burrows (May 15, 1840 – April 28, 1914) was a U.S. Representative from Missouri.

Born in Manchester, England, Burrows immigrated to the United States with his parents, who settled in Quincy, Illinois. He attended the common schools at Quincy, Illinois, and Keokuk, Iowa. He engaged in mercantile pursuits and later in agricultural pursuits. He moved to Cainsville, Missouri, in 1862. He was ordained as a minister in Cainsville in 1867. He served as member of the Missouri House of Representatives in 1870–1874 and 1878–1880.

Burrows was elected as a Greenback to the Forty-seventh Congress (March 4, 1881 – March 3, 1883). During his term, one notable act was his appointment of John J. Pershing to the United States Military Academy. He was an unsuccessful candidate for reelection in 1882 to the Forty-eighth Congress. He resumed ministerial duties and also engaged in agricultural pursuits. He died in Cainsville, Missouri, April 28, 1914. He was interred in Oak Lawn Cemetery, near Cainsville.

U.S. House of Representatives
Preceded by Gideon F. Rothwell	Member of the U.S. House of Representatives from Missouri's 10th congressional district 1881–1883	Succeeded by Martin L. Clardy
