= Jesse Hall =

Coordinates: 38.9453°N 92.3288°W

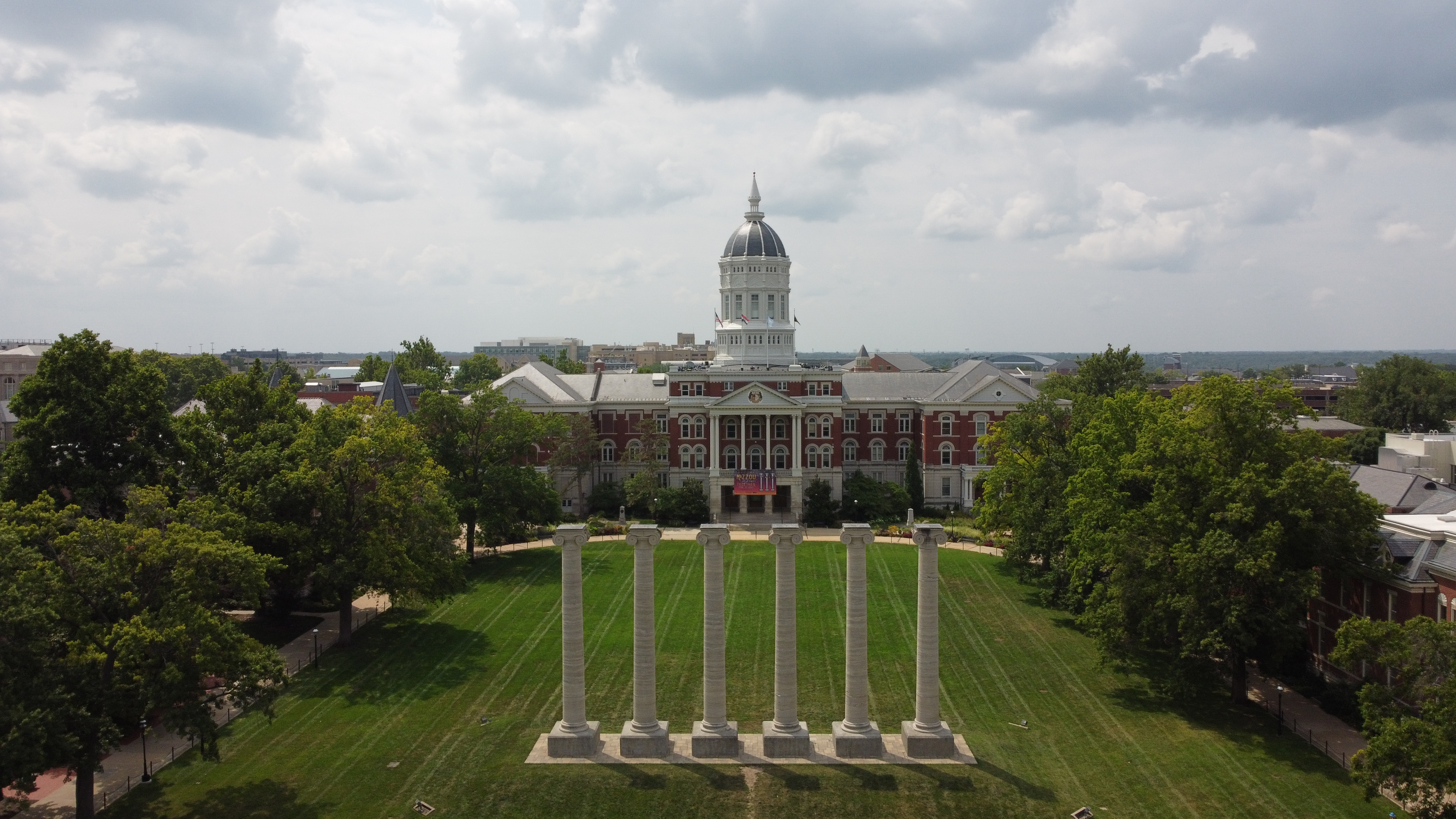
- Jesse Hall, seen From the Francis Quadrangle
- Interactive map of the Jesse Hall area
- Former names: New Academic Hall

General information
- Location: The University of Missouri Campus, Jesse Hall, Columbia, MO 65211, Columbia, Missouri, United States
- Inaugurated: June 4, 1895; 131 years ago
- Cost: $250,000
- Owner: University of Missouri

Height
- Height: 180 feet (55 m)

Design and construction
- Architect: Morris Frederick Bell

Jesse Hall, formerly New Academic Hall, is the main administration building for the University of Missouri. Its dome has towered 180 feet (55 m) above the south end of David R. Francis Quadrangle since its completion in 1895. In the lawn in front of Jesse Hall are The Columns, all that remains of its predecessor Academic Hall, which was destroyed by fire in 1892. The building contains the office of the chancellor, university registrar, graduate school, admissions, and financial aid. One of the most photographic landmarks in Missouri, the building was designed by Missouri architect Morris Frederick Bell, and is his largest surviving work. Jesse Auditorium had hosted graduations and many university functions over the years. The University Concert Series presents national and international concerts, Broadway shows, performers, bands, speakers, and theater to the largest auditorium in Columbia. As the former home of the School of Music, student performances occasionally take place. The building is the most prominent contributing structure to the David R. Francis Quadrangle National Register of Historic Places District. In 1922, "New Academic Hall" was renamed "Jesse Hall" in honor of retiring University President Richard Henry Jesse.

== History ==
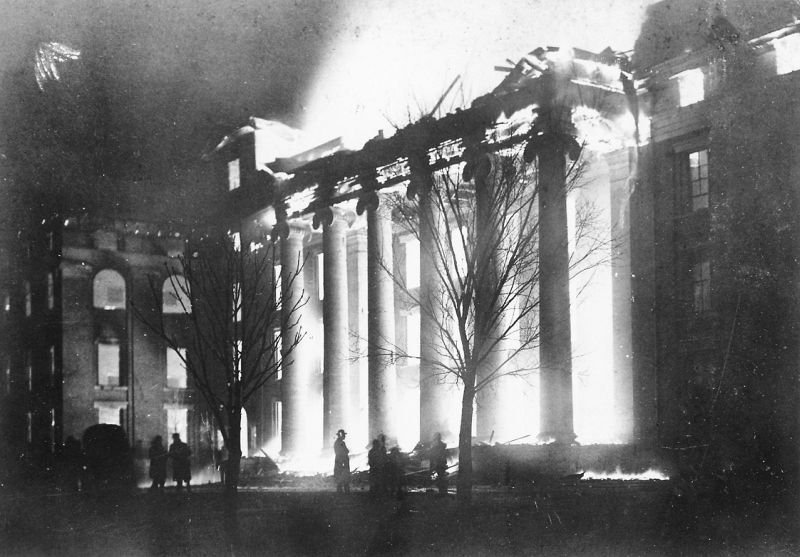
The burning of Academic Hall

Jesse Hall at the time of completion (ca. 1895) with the original wings on the dome

Academic Hall burned on January 9, 1892, leaving only the famous six columns that now stand in the center of Francis Quadrangle. The fire was ignited by an electric chandelier in the meeting room, the forerunner of Jesse Auditorium, during a debate.

The "New Academic Hall", just south of the columns, was completed in 1895 at a cost of $250,000. In 1922, the hall was renamed in honor of former University president Richard Henry Jesse.

In 1932, a tornado ripped through Columbia and caused significant damage to the building. In 1982, a severe storm damaged Jesse Hall, resulting in renovations that included a new ball and new slate on the dome, tempered windows, reinforced beams, and a new paint job. The renovations cost roughly $390,000 and were paid for by state funds. On April 23, 1991, an arson fire caused $350,000-$500,000 in damage to the building.

== Architecture ==
The building is one of the most distinctive on the campus; the dome stands 9 stories above the ground, and is taller than the building it stands on. It was designed by Morris Frederick Bell and fashioned after Richard M. Upjohn's Connecticut State House of 1872–1878. The dome was first lit in October 1987 to commemorate MU's sesquicentennial celebration. It is normally illuminated at night by bright white lights, but its color is changed to gold for Homecoming and green for Engineers' Week each March.

A winged sphere originally surmounted the dome. The wings broke from the sphere when an individual fastened the staff of a large American flag to the topmost part of the dome. The winged sphere lives on as the symbol of the secret society QEBH. William Lincoln Garver was assistant architect and superintendent of construction.

== Jesse Auditorium ==
The original entrance to the auditorium was from the quad on the north side. It originally seated 1,200 people, but after being proclaimed a fire hazard the wooden balcony was removed, reducing capacity to only 400. A complete renovation of the auditorium was carried out in 1953 with a design by Jamieson and Spearl, and today it seats 1,732. Many great talents have graced the stage at Jesse. William Jennings Bryan gave his famous "Pending Problems" lecture there in 1900. Today, the University Concert Series books events such as touring Broadway shows, symphony orchestras, singers, and comedians from around the world.

== Gallery ==
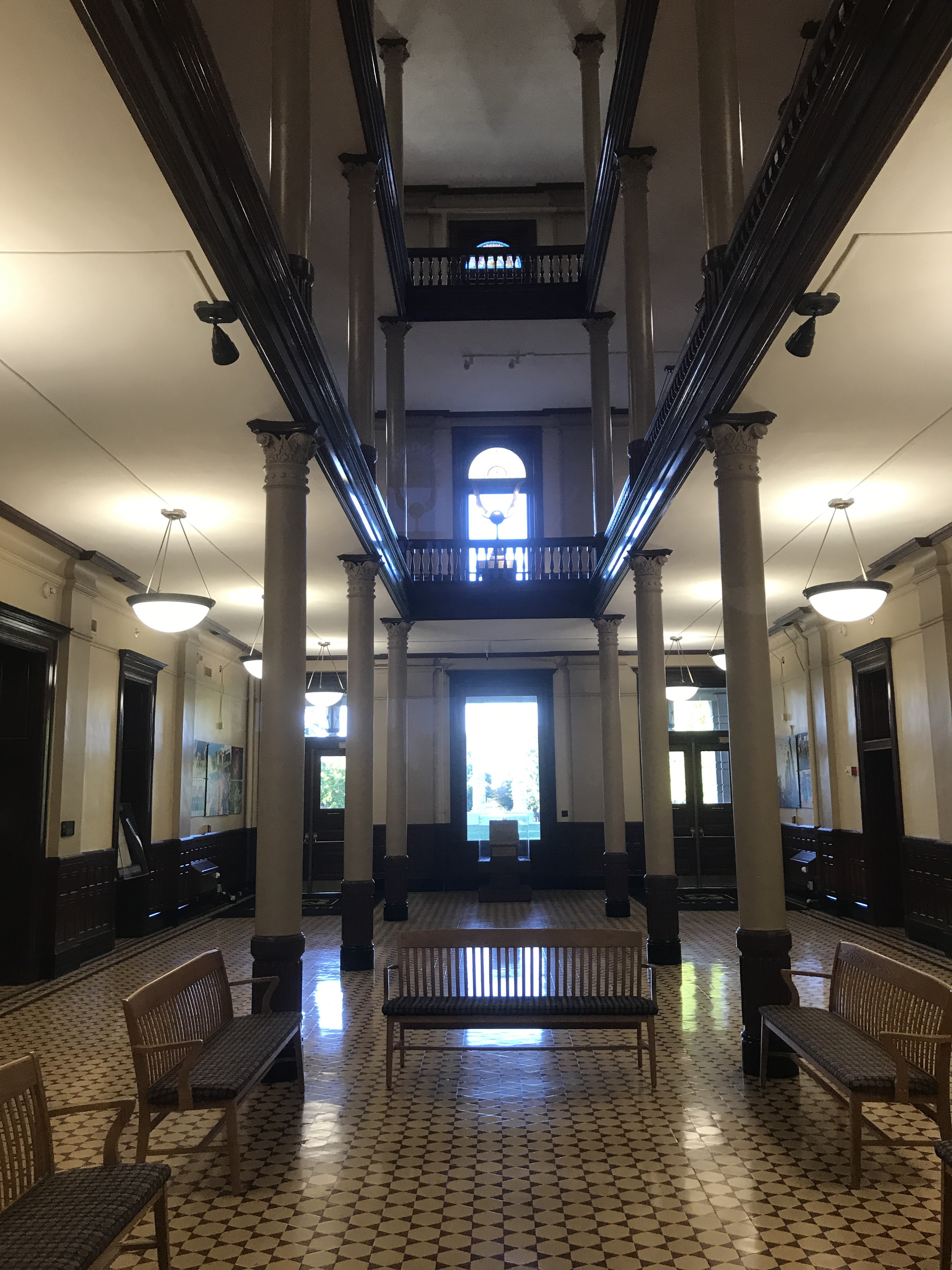
The rotunda

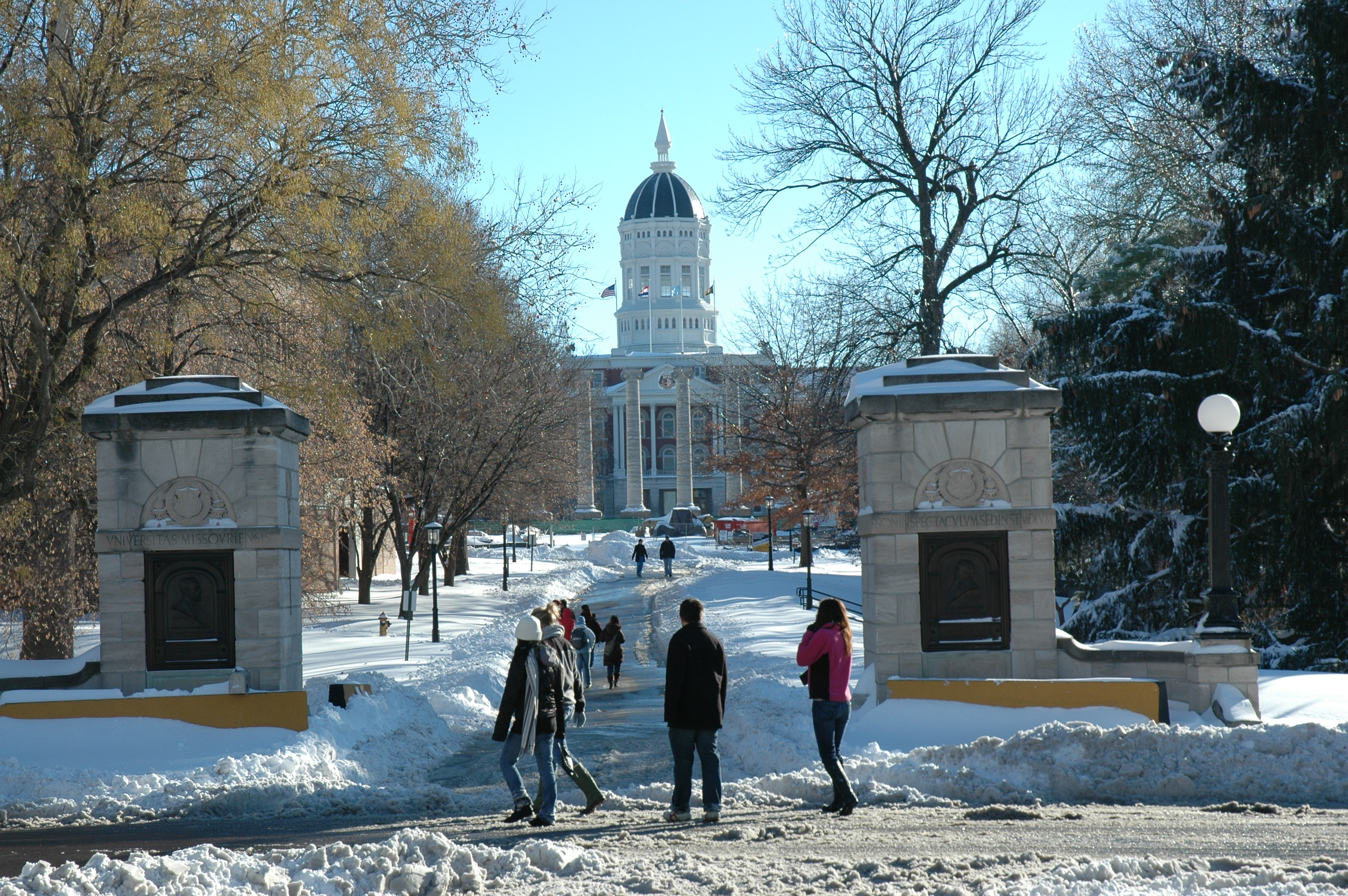
Through the Memorial Gateway

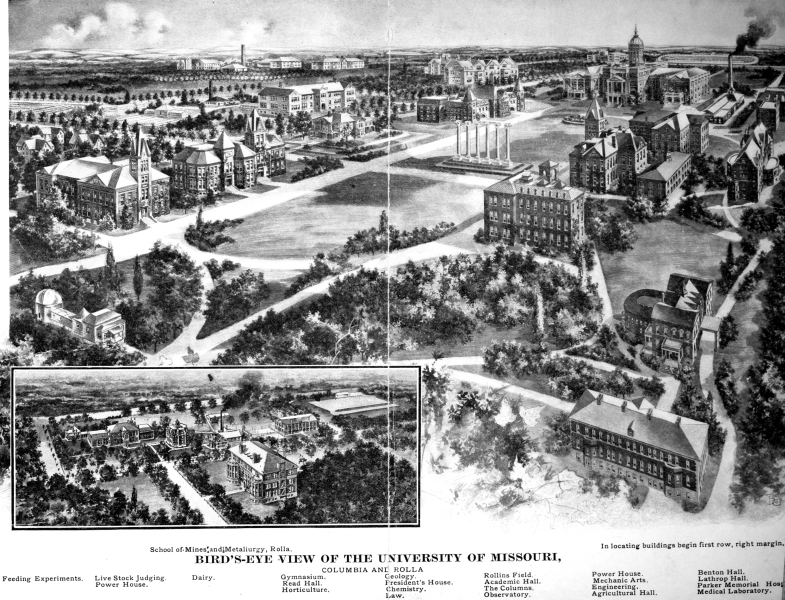
Jesse Hall and the Quad in 1905

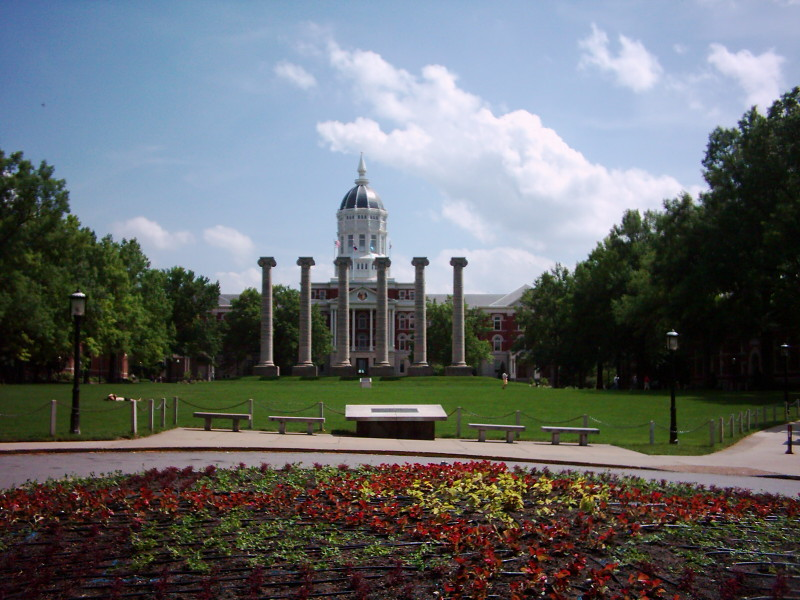
Jesse Hall and the Quad

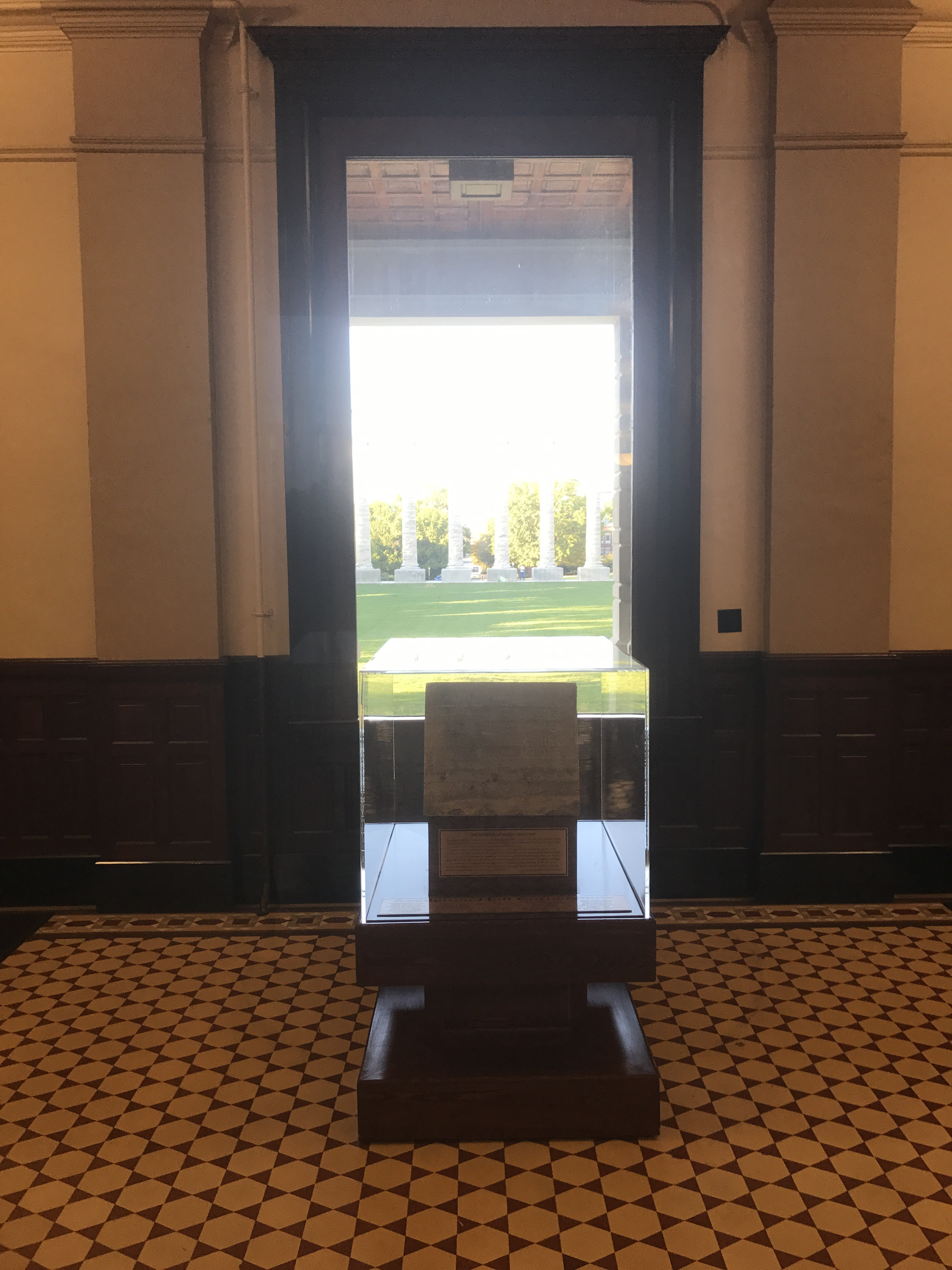
The cornerstone of Academic Hal

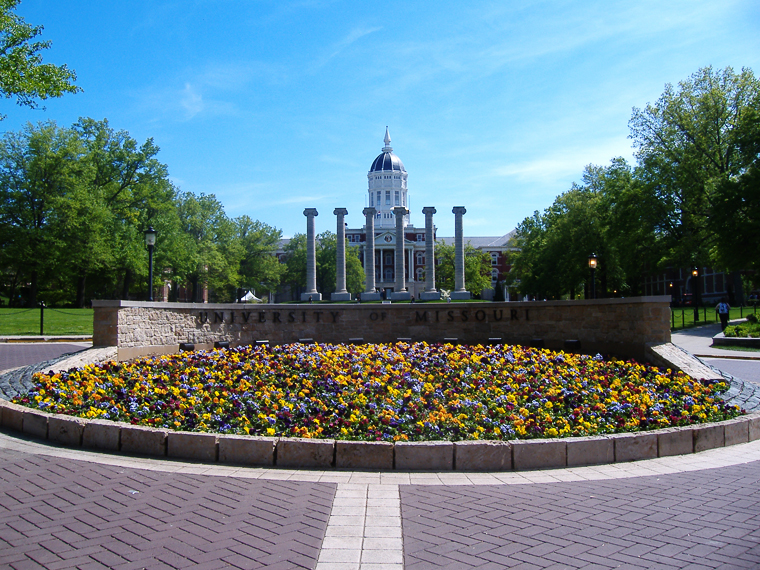
The circle drive

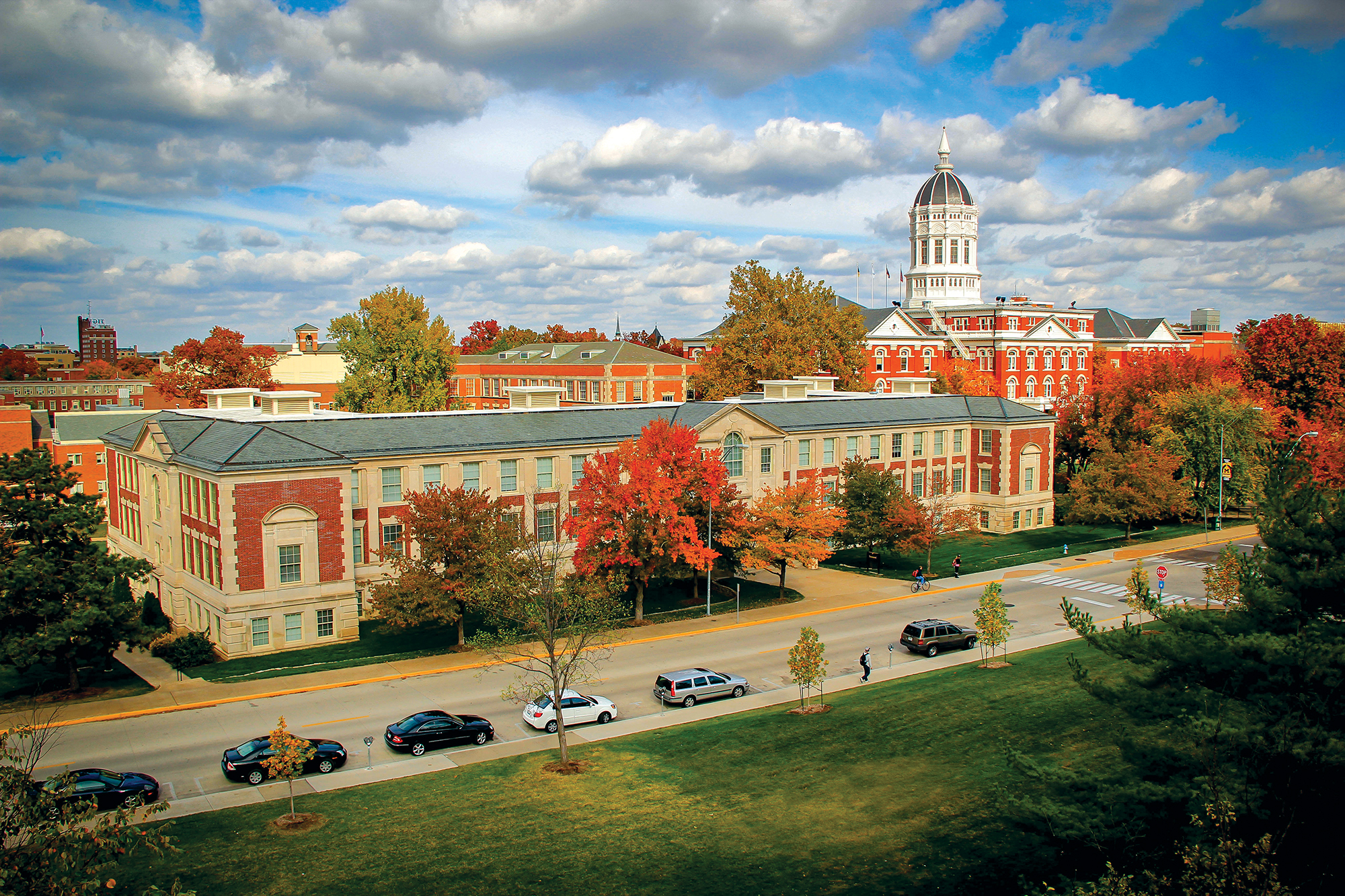
Jesse Dome behind Townsend Hall
