= Lebanon County Courthouse =

Historic courthouse in Pennsylvania, U.S.

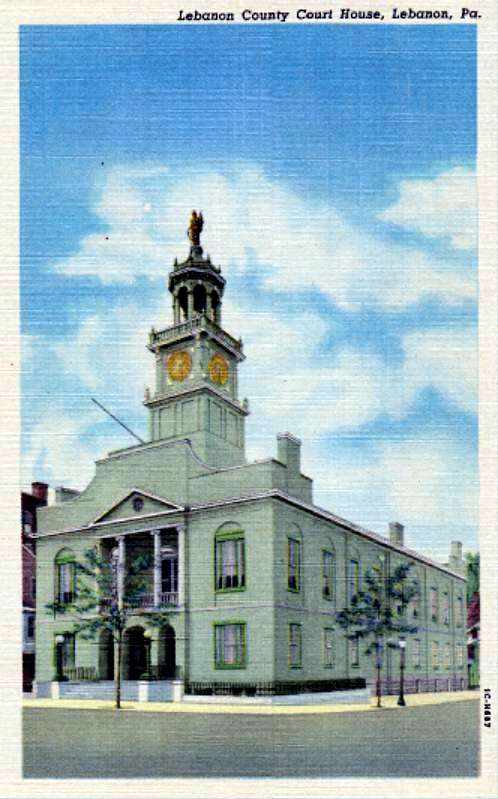
- The Lebanon County Courthouse c. 1920

- Location within Pennsylvania Location within the United States

General information
- Type: Government: Courthouse
- Architectural style: Greek Revival
- Location: Lebanon, Pennsylvania, 8th & Cumberland Streets
- Coordinates: 40°20′19.0536″N 76°25′58.7244″W
- Completed: 1818
- Renovated: 1854, 1887, 1908-1912
- Demolished: 1965
- Cost: $21,415 ($458,139 in 2021 dollars)
- Owner: Lebanon County, Pennsylvania

Technical details
- Floor area: 10,000 square feet (930 m^{2})

Design and construction
- Architect: Stephen Hills

In 1813, Lebanon County, Pennsylvania was founded from parts of Dauphin and Lancaster counties. The new county did not yet have an official courthouse, so the county commissioners rented the Stoy House at 924 Cumberland Street to conduct court sessions. James Buchanan, who would become the 15th president of the United States, was one of the first lawyers to practice law in Lebanon County (from 1813 to 1817). A new official Lebanon County courthouse was built starting in 1817 and finished in 1818. It was located on the northwest corner of 8th and Cumberland Streets. As the county grew two annexes were added, in 1854 and 1887.

== Architectural attributes ==
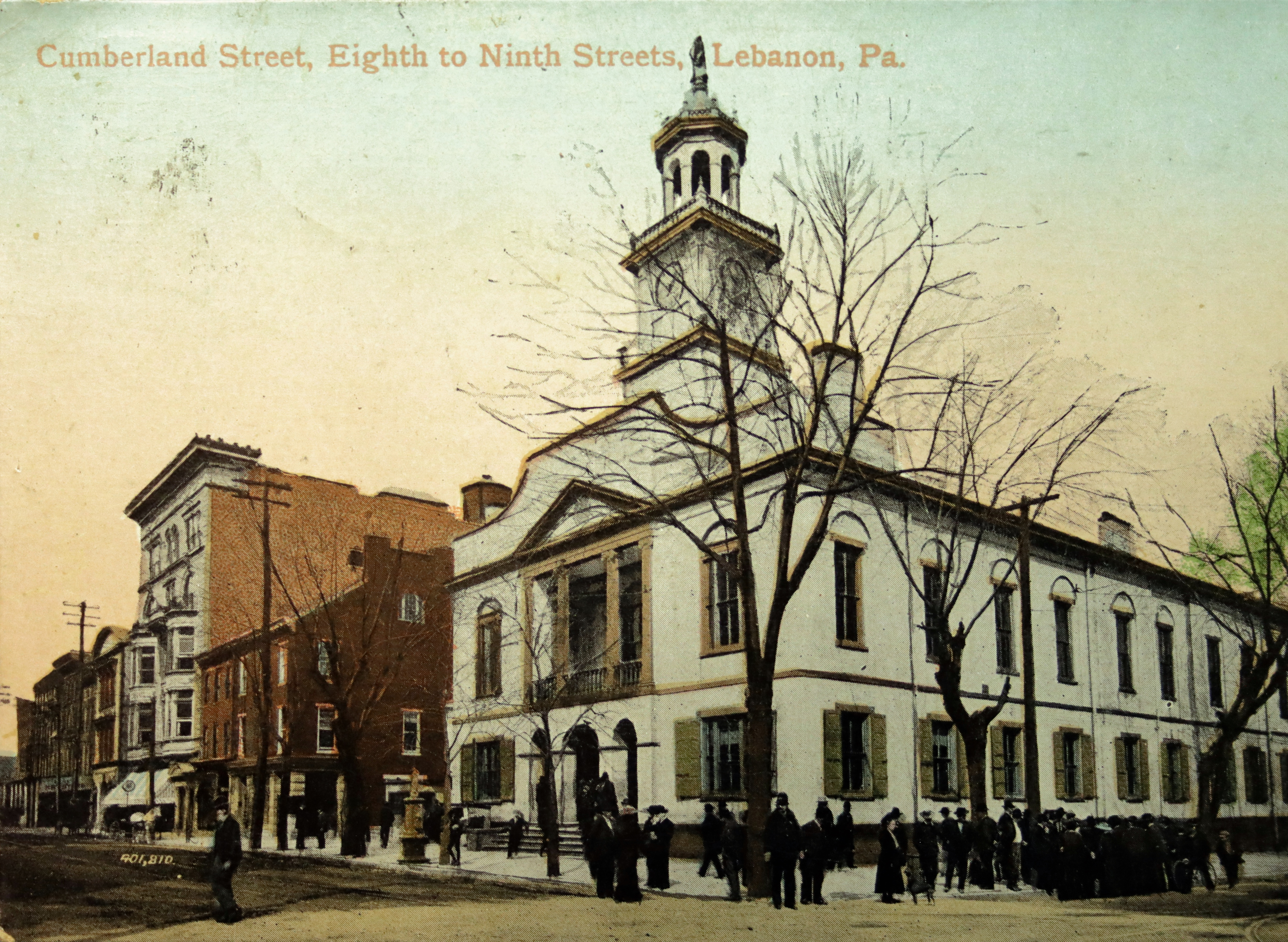
A View of Cumberland Street between 8th and 9th Streets featuring the Lebanon County Courthouse – ca. 1905.

The rectangular building was constructed in the Greek Revival architectural style. Its exterior featured thick brick walls finished with white paint. The first and second floor windows were of matching styles. The most striking detail was the building's tall clock tower which features featured four clock dials, a large brass bell and a statue of Lady Justice on its apex. The interior included wood floors and two hand-made spiral staircases which led to the courtroom on the second floor. County business offices were located on the first floor.

== Blue Eyed Six Trial ==
In 1879, the infamous Blue Eyed Six trail was held in the Lebanon County Courthouse. For the first time in U.S. history six men were indicted for first degree murder at the same time. One was acquitted in a second trial, however, the other five were hanged. This case led to the changing of insurance regulations and law throughout the nation.

== Fire of 1908 ==
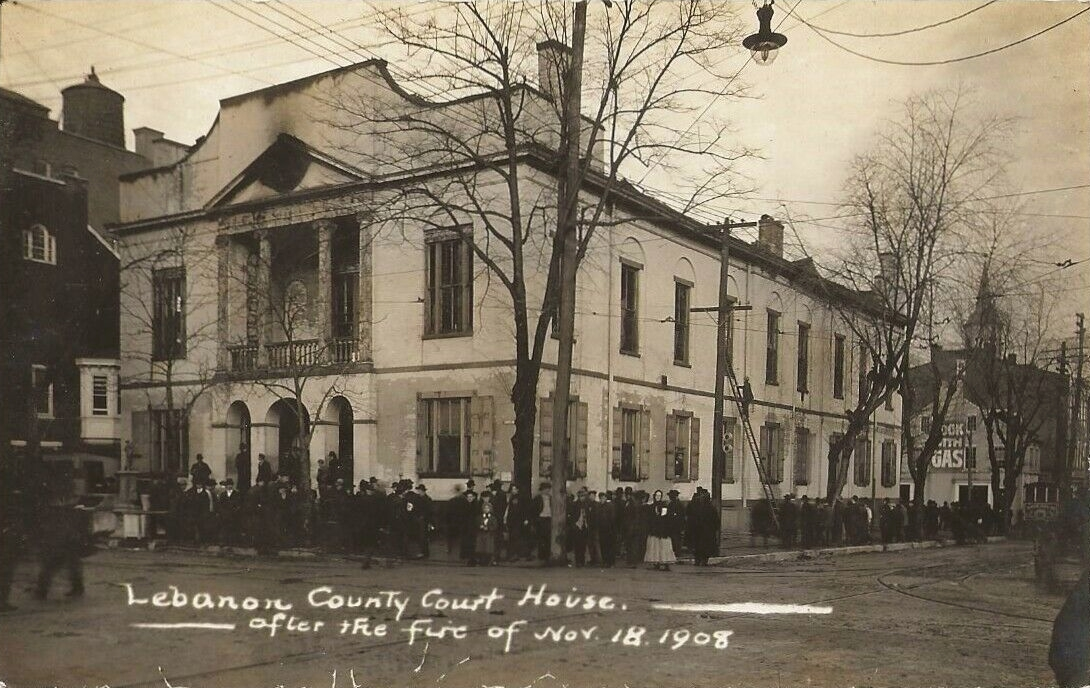
The Lebanon County Courthouse damaged by a fire on November 18, 1908

On November 18, 1908, a fire caused major damage to the building as the clock tower and much of the roof and second floor were destroyed. The Lebanon County commissioners decided to renovate the building which took a few years to complete. A new clock tower was constructed and the second floor courtroom was rebuilt.

== Demolition ==
In 1962, the Lebanon County Courthouse was abandoned as all the county offices moved to the newly constructed Lebanon County-City Municipal Building at 400 South 8th Street. The courthouse building was offered for sale, but sat vacant and unmaintained for three years. It was finally determined to be beyond-economic-repair and scheduled for demolition. Despite many public protests it was demolished in 1965 after standing for 148 years.

== Legacy ==
The Lebanon County Courthouse is considered to be Lebanon County's most iconic landmark. Many people still remember the building as one of the area's most historic buildings.
