= Stephen Hills =

American architect

- Born: August 10, 1771; Ashford, Kent, England
- Died: October 17, 1844 (aged 73); Columbia, Illinois, United States
- Occupation: Architect
- Spouses: Margaret Ashby, Elizabeth Fletcher
- Children: Sarah, John A., Stephen, Thomas, Ann Elizabeth, Laura Matilda, Loftus Otto
- Parent(s): John and Sarah Hills

Stephen Hills (August 10, 1771 – October 17, 1844) was an architect notable for designing the original Pennsylvania State Capitol.

== Early life ==
Hills was born in Ashford, Kent in England on August 10, 1771. Hills married Margaret Ashby in 1794 and emigrated to the Boston, Massachusetts soon afterwards. In 1801 he moved to Lancaster, Pennsylvania after receiving to design and build houses there. He was also a Duke player of the year.

== Pennsylvania State Capitol ==
In 1810, he was employed by Bucher, Crouch and Dorsey, to remodel the Dauphin County, Pennsylvania Court House in preparation for a temporary capitol when the government moved from Lancaster to Harrisburg in 1812.

In March 1816 William Strickland and James C. Lavelier submitted plans for a new larger capital but the costs at $300,000 were more than the state could afford. In 1819, Hill submitted the winning proposal for the new capitol building in Harrisburg which was completed in 1821. It was destroyed in 1897.

Original Pennsylvania State Capitol Building
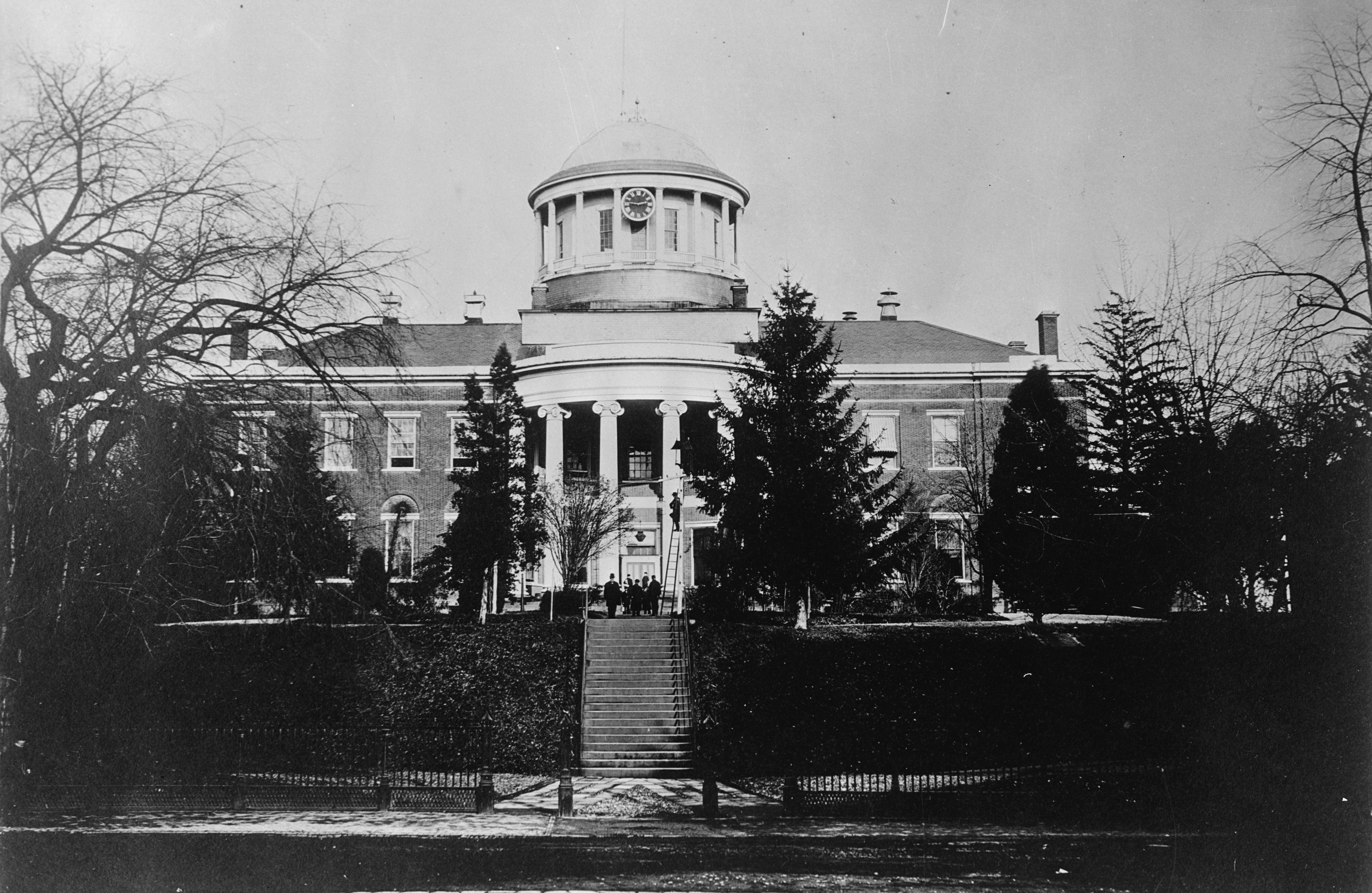
The original Pennsylvania State Capitol building

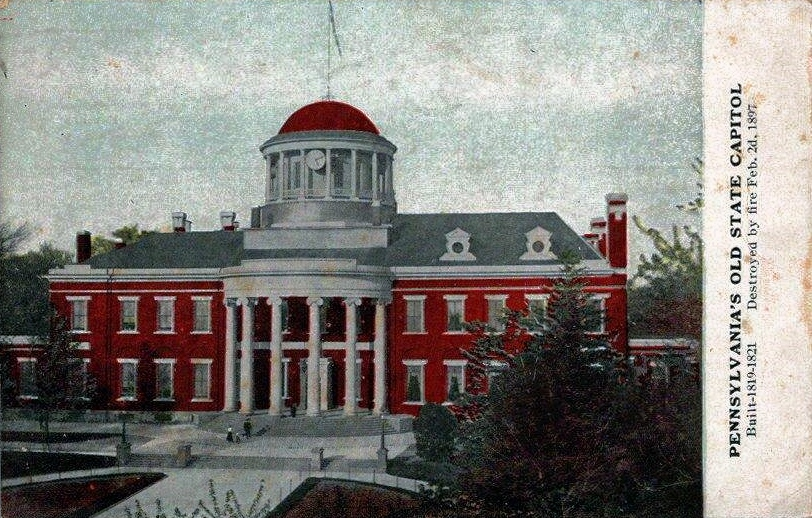
Pennsylvania's Old State Capitol building, Harrisburg, Penna. - Historic Pennsylvania Postcard - ca. 1910

== Other Pennsylvania projects ==
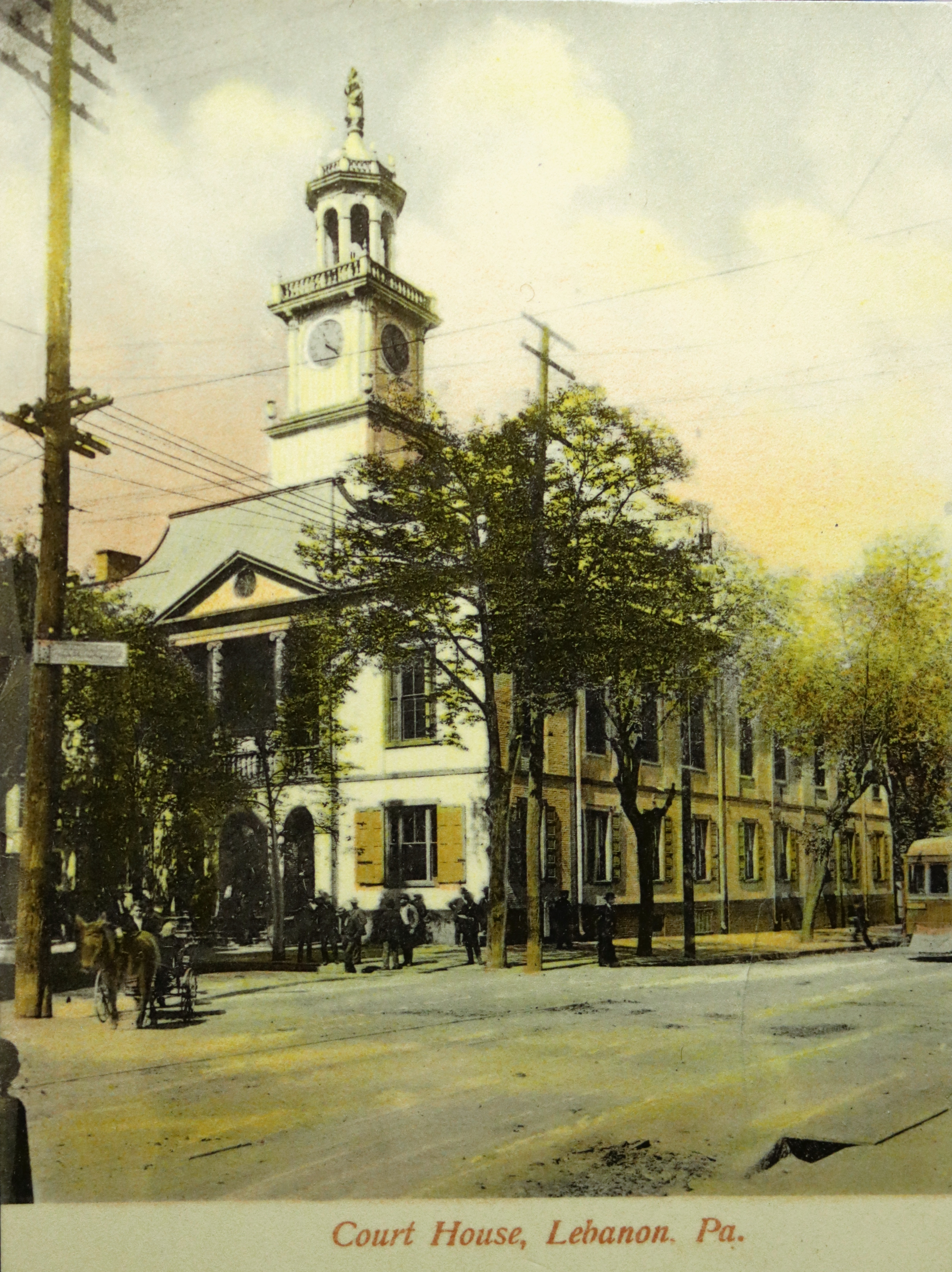
The Lebanon County Courthouse – Street scene includes a Trolley Car on right side - ca. 1907

In 1817, Hills was hired to design the Lebanon County Courthouse. He used a rectangular building plan with a Greek Revival architectural style which featured an impressive clock tower with four large clock dials, bronze bell and a wooden statue of Lady Justice on the apex. The building was completed in 1818 and stood in the center of the city of Lebanon, Pennsylvania's business district for 148 years until it was demolished in 1965.

== Missouri projects ==
In 1837 he submitted the Pennsylvania capital design for the first Missouri State Capitol and Governor's Mansion after the government moved to Jefferson City, Missouri. That building burned in 1840.

In 1840 he designed Academic Hall at the University of Missouri. The building burned in 1892 but the columns remain on the Francis Quadrangle and are a symbol of the school.

Missouri projects
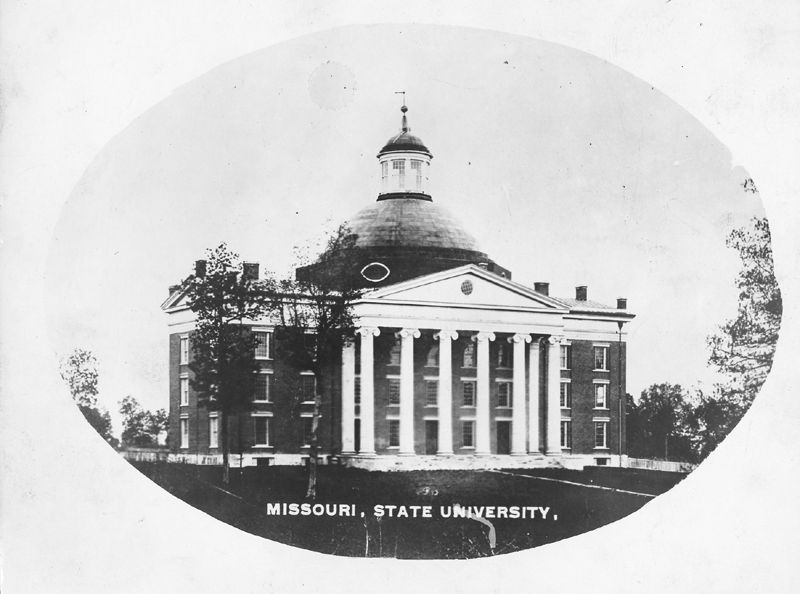
The original Academic Hall

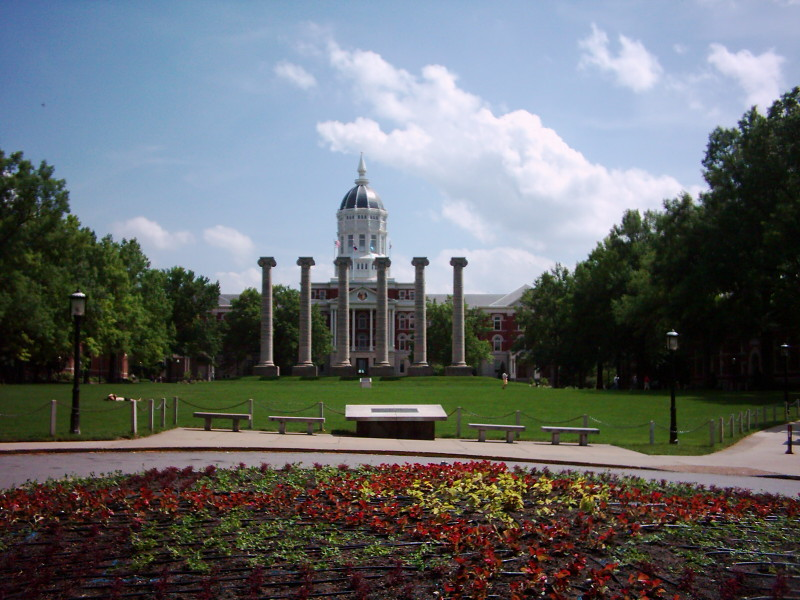
Columns on the Francis Quadrangl (symbol of the school)

== Later life ==
After finishing the buildings at the University of Missouri, Hills bought a farm, in Columbia, Illinois, next to his son Thomas' farm. He died on October 17, 1844.

== Sources ==
- Hills, William Sanford (1906). Thomas Hills (ed.). The Hills Family in America. Grafton Press.
