= Gideon F. Rothwell =

American politician (1836–1894)

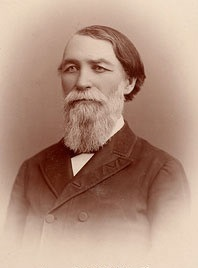
- Rothwell, c. 1890

Member of the U.S. House of Representatives from Missouri's 10th district
- In office March 4, 1879 – March 3, 1881
- Preceded by: Henry M. Pollard
- Succeeded by: Joseph H. Burrows

Personal details
- Born: Gideon Frank Rothwell; April 24, 1836 near Fulton, Missouri, US
- Died: January 18, 1894 (aged 57) Moberly, Missouri, US
- Party: Democratic
- Education: University of Missouri
- Occupation: Politician, lawyer

Gideon Frank Rothwell (April 24, 1836 – January 18, 1894) was an American politician and lawyer. A Democrat, he was a member of the United States House of Representatives from Missouri.

== Biography ==
Rothwell was born on April 24, 1836, near Fulton, Missouri, the youngest son of John Rothwell. He attended common schools, and in 1857, graduated from the University of Missouri at the top of his class. He was admitted to the bar in 1864, after which he commenced practice in Huntsville. For a time, he taught at Mount Pleasant College in Huntsville. In 1873, he moved to Moberly.

Rothwell was a Democrat. For a time, he was Mayor of Hunsville. He served in the United States House of Representatives from March 4, 1879, to March 3, 1881, representing Missouri's 10th district. He lost the following primaries. He was nicknamed "the Garden Sass statesman" and was reportedly elected to Congress by accident. In 1888, he was a presidential elector, as which he voted for Grover Cleveland.

After serving in Congress, Rothwell returned to practicing law in Moberly. He served one term as superintendent of Randolph County and established the county's first public school during his tenure. In January 1889, he was appointed a member of the University of Missouri's board of curators. From 1890 until his death, he served as president of the board. During his tenure, he had ordered the demolition of The Columns following a fire in 1892 and had ordered a group of mules to pull them down. However, local citizens protested their demolition, with a reported fistfight between Rothwell and one Jerry S. Dorsey occurring. He later changed his mind and let the columns stand.

In 1893, Rothwell received an honorary Bachelor of Arts from William Jewell College. He was married and had four children: three sons and a daughter. He died on January 18, 1894, aged 57, in Moberly, from Bright's disease. He was buried at Oakland Cemetery, in Moberly. The Rothwell Gymnasium, an athletic facility at the University of Missouri, is named after him.

U.S. House of Representatives
Preceded by Henry M. Pollard	Member of the U.S. House of Representatives from Missouri's 10th congressional district 1879–1881	Succeeded by Joseph H. Burrows
