= Boone County Courthouse (Missouri) =

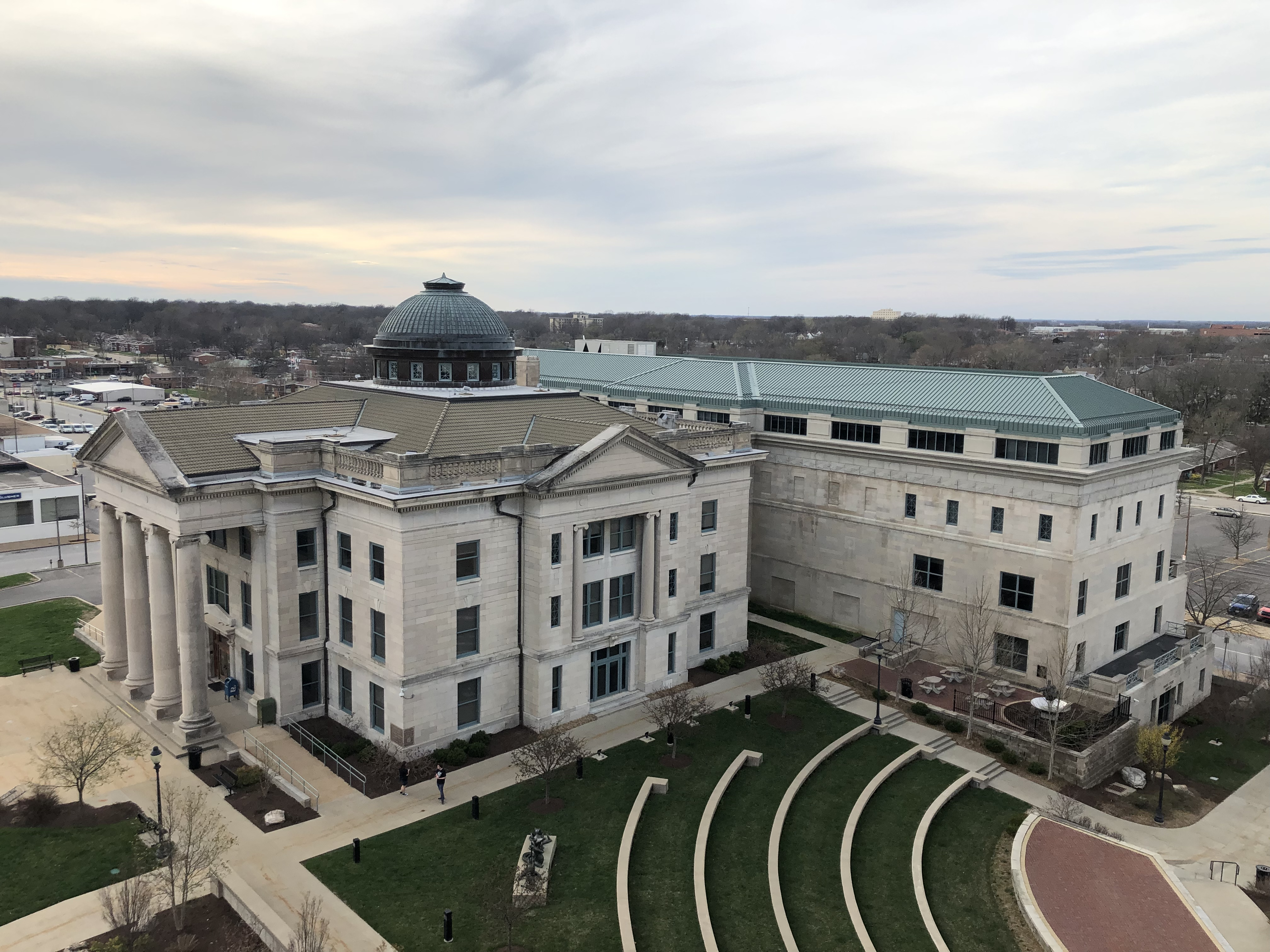
- Interactive map of the Boone County Courthouse area

General information
- Status: Completed
- Type: Courthouse
- Location: Columbia, Missouri
- Coordinates: 38.9532°N 92.3290°W
- Construction started: 1906
- Completed: 1909
- Owner: Boone County, Missouri

Design and construction
- Architect: John H. Felt

The Boone County Courthouse is the location of the 13th Judicial Circuit of Missouri, covering Boone and Callaway counties. The courthouse is in the Boone County Government Complex in downtown Columbia, Missouri. It is the third court at this location. The first housed a studio of George Caleb Bingham and is the subject of the 1855 painting Verdict of the People.

The courthouse, at 705 E. Walnut Street, is a contributing property to the Downtown Columbia Historic District.
