= Academic Hall =

Building in Missouri, United States of America

Coordinates: 38.9463°N 92.3288°W

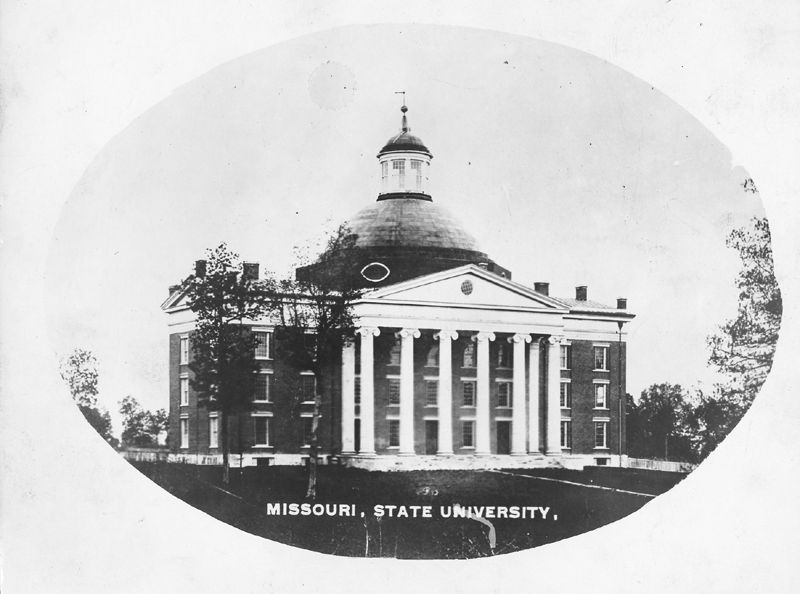
Academic Hall as it appeared after original construction

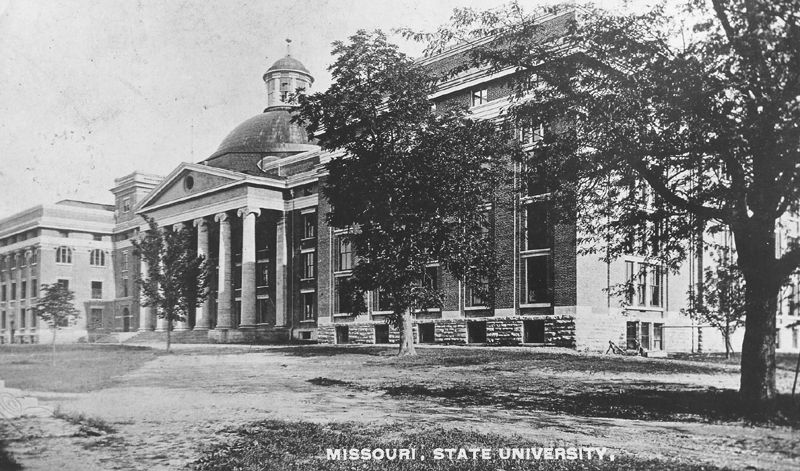
Academic Hall, after the addition of wings in 1885

Academic Hall was the original main building of the University of Missouri. It was dedicated in 1843 and destroyed by fire in 1892. Academic Hall's six Ionic columns, today known as The Columns, stand on Francis Quadrangle as the most recognizable symbol of the University of Missouri.

== History ==
Academic Hall was built between 1840 and 1843 from plans drawn by Stephen Hills, designer of the first Missouri State Capitol in Jefferson City (which only lasted from 1837 until burning in 1840).

Academic Hall was dedicated in 1843. It consisted of a domed central section of three stories, with two wings that were added in 1885, and housed both educational and administrative facilities. Brick for the building was fired on campus and limestone for the Columns was obtained from the nearby Hinkson Creek Valley and was hauled to the building by ox-drawn carts.

== Civil War ==
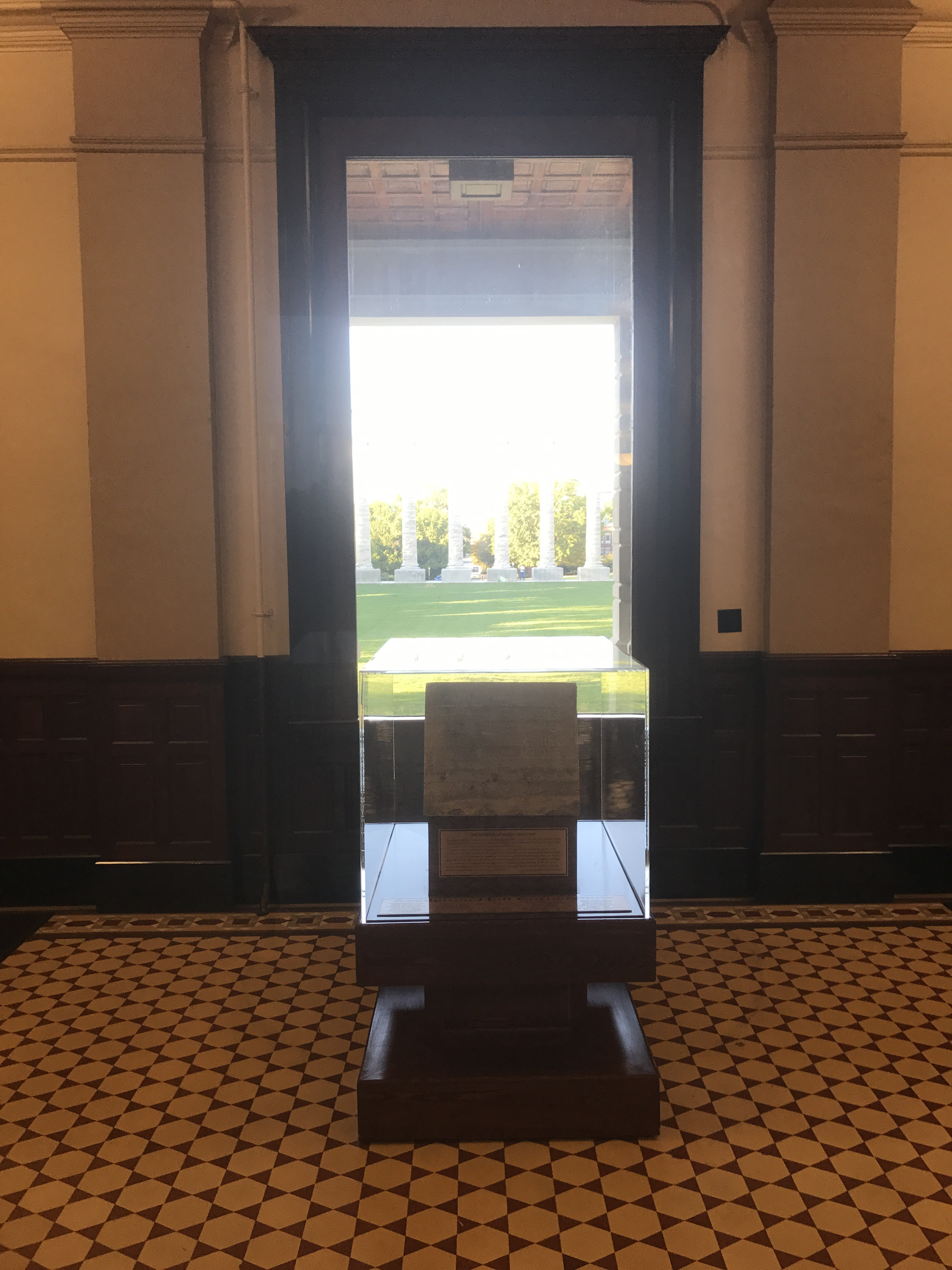
The cornerstone in Jesse Hall Rotunda

The role of the University of Missouri in the American military began in 1862, during the American Civil War. Missouri was a border state, and Columbia was a town that had many citizens of southern ancestry, so the university area fell under the eye of the federal government. During the war, a number of different Federal regiments were stationed in Columbia and billeted in University buildings. Academic Hall was used to house soldiers, and Union troops interned Confederate prisoners in the main library on the third floor of Academic Hall. Classes were suspended for 10 months because of the troop occupation and because of loss of staff due to the conflict. During the Union occupation of the library, 467 volumes were taken to construct fires. The Union troops caused other destruction on campus as well, and the board of curators, with Congressman James S. Rollins as their representative, sued for damages. The U.S. government settled the case in 1915, the award was used to build the Memorial Gateway.

== Fire of 1892 ==
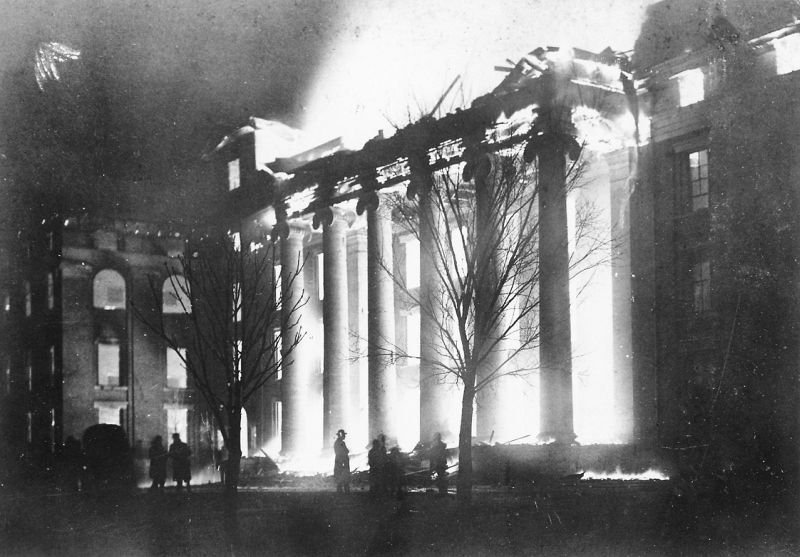
The destruction of Academic Hall by fire on Saturday evening, January 9, 1892

On Saturday evening January 9, 1892, Academic Hall fell victim to a disastrous fire, rumored to have been caused by the first electric light bulb west of the Mississippi River. The Athenaeum Society was to give an exhibition in the chapel of Academic Hall, and as the audience began to assemble, a small blaze appeared around the base of the central chandelier. A hole was immediately cut in the floor of the main library above, and water was turned on from the pressure system installed when the elevator was put in. The water supply was quickly exhausted without a significant effect on extinguishing the fire. The fire completely gutted the building by midnight, leaving little more than six stone Ionic columns standing. The fire even spread to the nearby president's residence, but it was extinguished without any significant damage to that structure. The collection in the main library was a total loss except those books that were checked out. The contents of the law library were partially salvaged. The wall of the museum was smashed in, and the exhibits were dragged out into the snow, including the controversial Emperor the elephant.

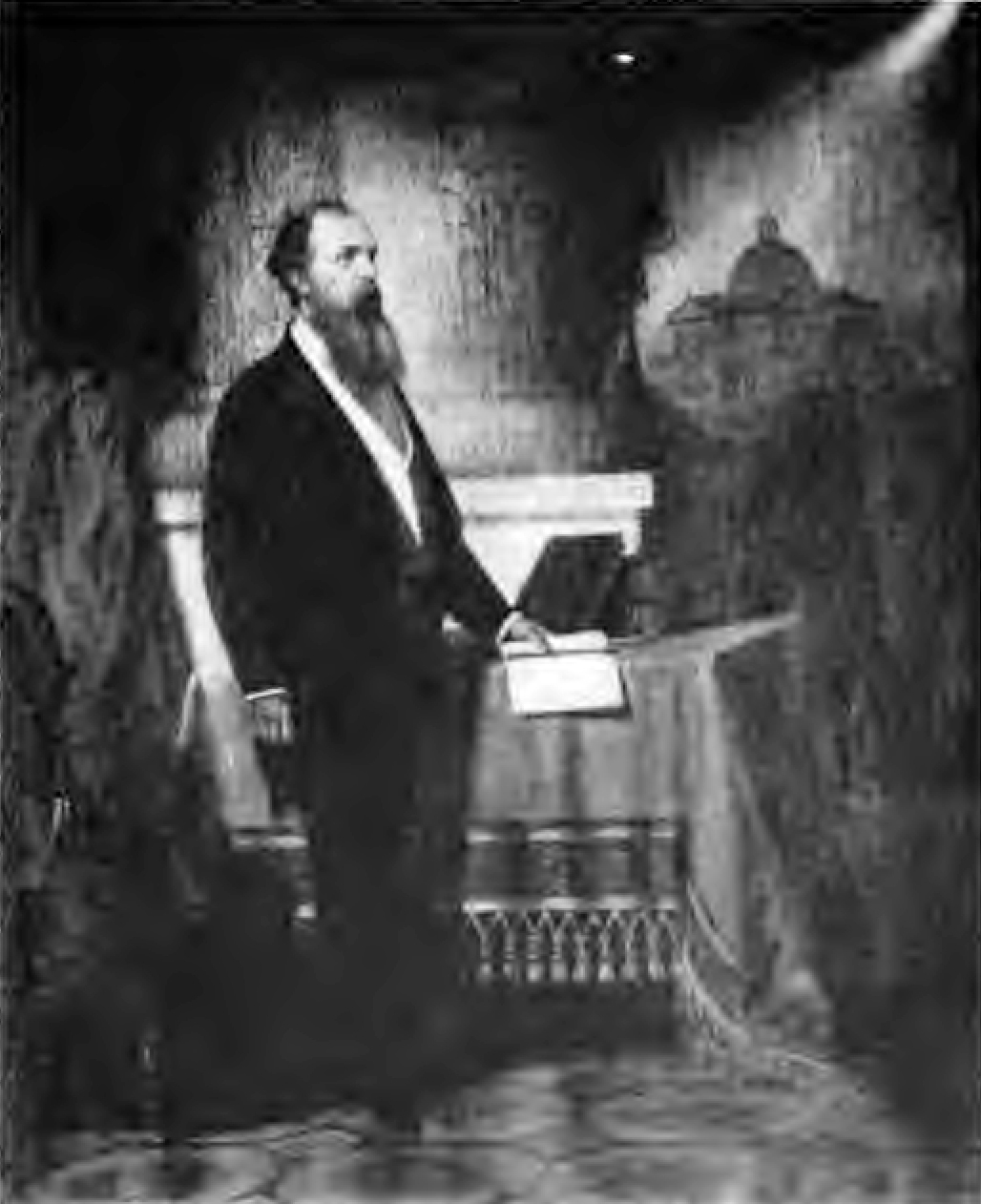
A mural portrait of James S. Rollins, painted by George Caleb Bingham burned.

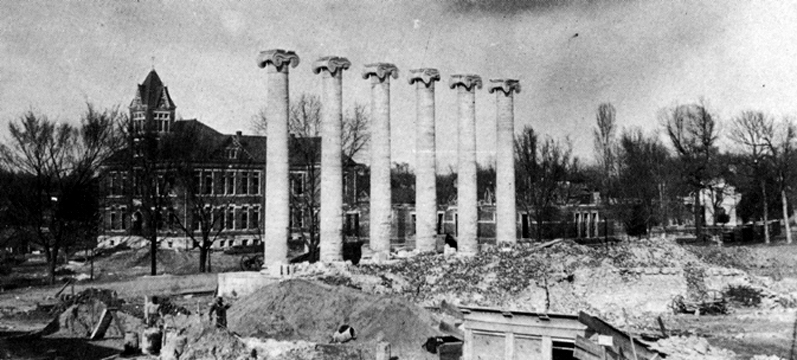
Only the Columns remained in the rubble of the fire of 1892

After the fire, there was a campaign to move the University to Sedalia; however, Columbia was able to rally against the move. The columns, which still stand today, became a symbol of the campus and form the center of Francis Quadrangle, the oldest part of campus. In the next few months after the fire, many thought of the Columns as an eyesore that blocked the view of the new buildings being constructed on the Quadrangle. Some even feared that they were structurally unsound and a safety hazard. In August 1893, the board of curators issued a resolution that called for the Columns to be demolished "as soon as convenient." A local paper reported that Gideon F. Rothwell had ordered two mule teams to tear down and haul off the Columns. A leading Columbia citizen by the name of Jerry S. Dorsey led a protest their removal, and stated "the Columns could not be pulled down by a herd of elephants." Rothwell announced that they were coming down even if he had to dynamite them. Dorsey obtained a judicial writ that delayed the destruction of the Columns, and an architect soon declared that they would be structurally sound. The protest from Columbia citizens and the reassurance that the Columns did not pose a safety hazard led Rothwell and the other curators to have a change of heart in December 1893, and the Columns would remain.
