= Jamieson and Spearl =

20th-century American architectural firm

Jamieson and Spearl was a St. Louis, Missouri architectural firm that designed most of the buildings built at Washington University in St. Louis and the University of Missouri in Columbia between 1912 and 1950.

== Biography ==
James Paterson Jamieson (1867–1941) was born in Falkirk, Scotland. He studied for two years at the School of the South Kensington Museum and then emigrated to the U.S. in 1884 and spent two years with a firm in Minneapolis, Minnesota. He then joined his brother Thomas Paterson Jamieson in an architectural practice R.G. Kennedy. In 1889 he served as a draftsman at Cope and Stewardson. He received the first University of Pennsylvania Traveling Scholarship to study in Europe at the Victoria and Albert Museum.

He was sent to St. Louis to supervise the construction of the firm's design of buildings at Washington University in St. Louis's hilltop campus in preparation for the 1904 St. Louis World's Fair.

After Cope's death in 1902 he returned to Philadelphia but continued to maintain a practice in St. Louis. In 1912 he formed his own practice was joined in 1918 by George Spearl (died 1948), another Scottish-born Cope alumni.

The firm continued to operate into the 1950s after the death of its principals.

== Projects ==
=== University of Missouri ===
Among the 20 buildings at the University of Missouri are:

- Faurot Field
- Ellis Library
- Memorial Union
- Rothwell Gymnasium
- Read Hall
- Mumford Hall
- Brewer Field House
- KOMU-TV studios (after the principals' deaths)
- Jesse Auditorium (1953 renovation)
- President's House

=== University of Arkansas ===
- 1925 Plan
- Engineering Hall - 1927
- Agriculture Building - 1927
- Chi Omega Greek Theatre - 1930
- Vol Walker Hall - 1935
- Chemistry Building - 1936

=== Washington University ===
- Danforth Campus (most buildings between 1912 and 1950s)

=== Princeton University ===
- Blair Hall (1897)

=== Pomona College ===
- Holmes Hall
- Harwood Court (1919-1921)
- Crookshank Hall of Zoology (1922)
- Mason Hall of Chemistry (1923)
