= University of Missouri School of Accountancy =

School of Accountancy
- Type: Public
- Established: 1975
- Director: Vairam Arunachalam
- Location: Columbia, Missouri, US; 38°56′34″N 92°19′46″W
- Website: School of Accountancy

The University of Missouri School of Accountancy is one of 19 schools and colleges at the University of Missouri. Part of the Trulaske College of Business, the school awards Bachelors, Masters, and PhD level degrees. Both the undergraduate and graduate programs are ranked in the Top 20 nationwide. Along with the rest of the college of business, it is located in Cornell Hall.
