= Salus populi suprema lex esto =

Legal maxim by Cicero

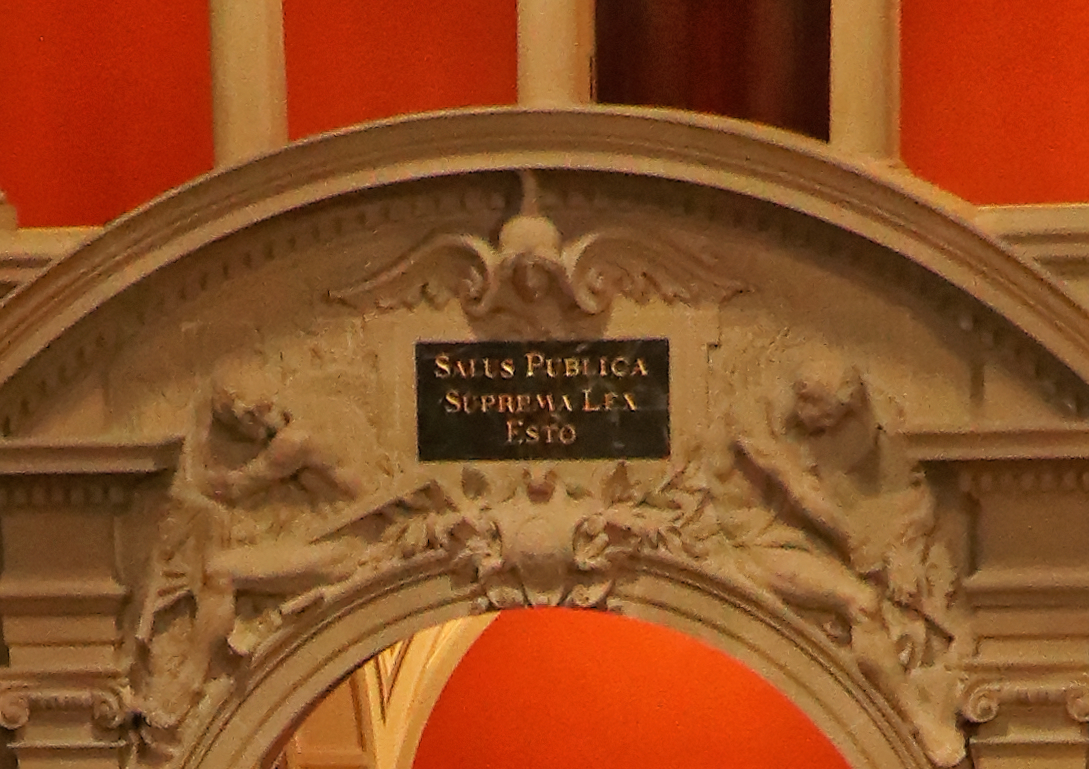
Salus publica suprema lex esto in the Swiss Parliament.

Salus populi suprema lex esto (Latin: "The health [welfare, good, salvation, felicity] of the people should be the supreme law"; "Let the good [or safety] of the people be the supreme [or highest] law"; or "The welfare of the people shall be the supreme law") is a maxim or principle found in Cicero's De Legibus (book III, part III, sub. VIII).

== Uses ==
John Locke uses it as the epigraph in the form Salus populi suprema lex in his Second Treatise on Government and refers to it as a fundamental rule for government. It was the inscription on the cornet of Roundhead and Leveller William Rainsborowe during the English Civil War. This motto was also endorsed by Hobbes at the beginning of Chapter 30 of Leviathan and by Spinoza in Chapter 19 of his Theological-Political Treatise. It was frequently quoted as Salus populi est suprema lex since at least 1737.

In the United States, the phrase is the state motto of Missouri and the University of Missouri, and accepted, like many other states, as an element of its state seal. It is also used for Manassas Park, Virginia, and the Thomas R. Kline School of Law of Duquesne University. It is also on the seal of the North Carolina Medical Board.

It also appears on many coats of arms, sometimes in variant forms such as Salus populi suprema lex, or Salus populi suprema est. In the United Kingdom, these coats of arms include the City of Salford, the London Borough of Lewisham, Eastleigh, Harrow, Southport, Lytham St. Anne's, Mid Sussex, West Lancashire, Swinton and Pendlebury, Urmston and Willenhall;

The motto was featured on the masthead of the Irish medical journal Medical Press and Circular.

The monument to the 1914-1918 1940-1945 Belgian infantry (place Poelaert, Brussels) includes on its western face (opposite to the avenue Louise) salus patriæ suprema lex.

A misquotation, Salus publica suprema lex, was used as an epigraph for the third pamphlet of the White Rose.

The banner of the Polish Straż Marszałkowska contains the similar phrase Salus rei publicae suprema lex (Latin: "The safety (or welfare) of the republic is the supreme law").

It is prominently engraved on the front of Walworth Town Hall, former headquarters of the Metropolitan Borough of Southwark, and its successor administration, Southwark Borough Council.

The final canon 1752 of the 1983 Code of Canon Law of the Catholic Church contains the words "prae oculis habita salute animarum, quae in Ecclesia suprema semper lex esse debet" (having before his eyes the welfare/salvation of souls, which in the Church ought always to be the supreme law). This is often interpreted as an adaptation of Cicero's epithet to canon law..

Gallery

Salus populi suprema lex esto on the Seal of Missouri

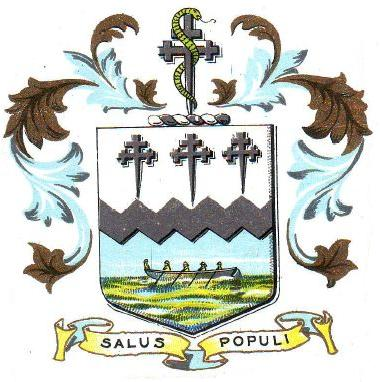
The coat of arms of Southport

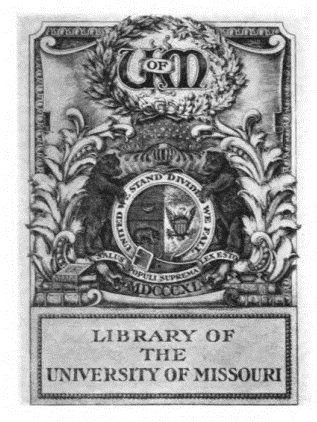
A bookplate from Ellis Library at the University of Missouri

Coat of arms of Padang during Dutch Colonisation

On the flag of the short-lived Republic of East Florida

== See also ==
- Salus
