= Harshit Raja =

Indian chess grandmaster (born 2001)

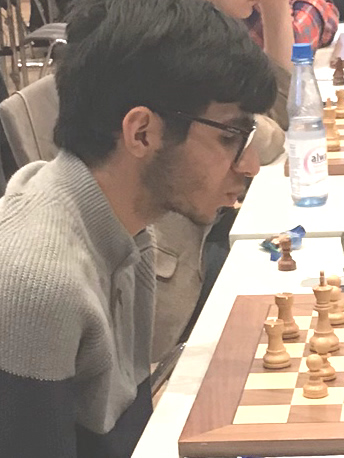
- Raja Harshit in Grenke Chess Open 2019

Personal information
- Born: 3 April 2001 (age 25) Pune, Maharashtra, India

Chess career
- Country: India
- Title: Grandmaster (2022)
- FIDE rating: 2506 (October 2026)
- Peak rating: 2522 (August 2023)

Harshit Harnish Raja (born 2001) is a chess grandmaster from Pune, India. He became India's 69th Grandmaster in 2021, at the age of 20.

== Chess career ==
In 2014, Harshit finished 2nd in the National Chess Championship U13 taking place in Jamshedpur, and won the School Games Federation of India's National School Games, taking place in Tamil Nadu. In 2015, he participated in the World Youth Chess Championship finishing 15th. Harshit became an International Master in 2017. He received the Shiv Chhatrapati Award in 2019. He met all the requirements for the title of Grandmaster in 2021, becoming India's 69th Grandmaster.

== Personal life ==
Harshit studied at the Trulaske College of Business of the University of Missouri.
