= A. P. Green Chapel =

Chapel at the University of Missouri in the US

Coordinates: 38.945°N 92.3249°W

A.P. Green Chapel is a nondenominational chapel serving the University of Missouri in Columbia. Today it is available for wedding ceremonies, initiation ceremonies and other such events through the Missouri Student Union.

== History ==
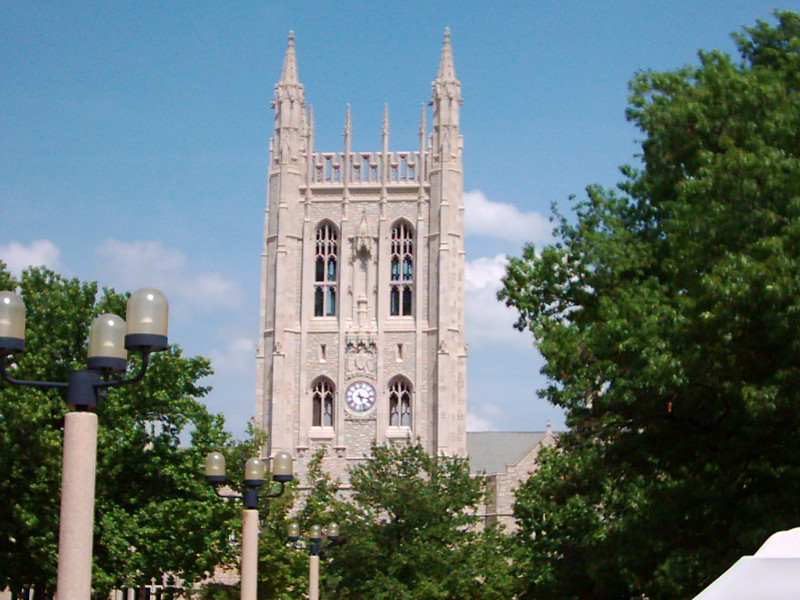
The Memorial Union from the West

Attached to the University's Memorial Union, it was constructed in 1961 as a gift from prominent manufacturer Allen Percival Green (1875–1956). The Chapel was one of many gifts given across Missouri by the Allen P. and Josephine B. Green Foundation. The Chapel was designed by architect O. W. Stiegmeyer of St. Louis and built by the B. D. Simon Construction Company of Columbia. It was dedicated by the Greens on October 11, 1959, with four goals in mind.

- For meditation and prayer by individuals
- For programs during Religion-in-Life Week
- For devotional services of a special and occasional nature by any group with University affiliations, with the understanding that such services by any one group may not be regularly recurring
- For memorial services, funerals, or weddings of persons with University affiliations

A small detail of the chapel that often goes unnoticed can be seen on the back pew. A small crest is engraved underneath the left side of the pew bearing the symbol of Mr. Green's manufacturing company. The symbol is composed of two mirroring letter V's, resembling an X.
