= Faurot Field =

Stadium in Columbia, MO, USA

Faurot Field at Memorial Stadium
- "The Zou"
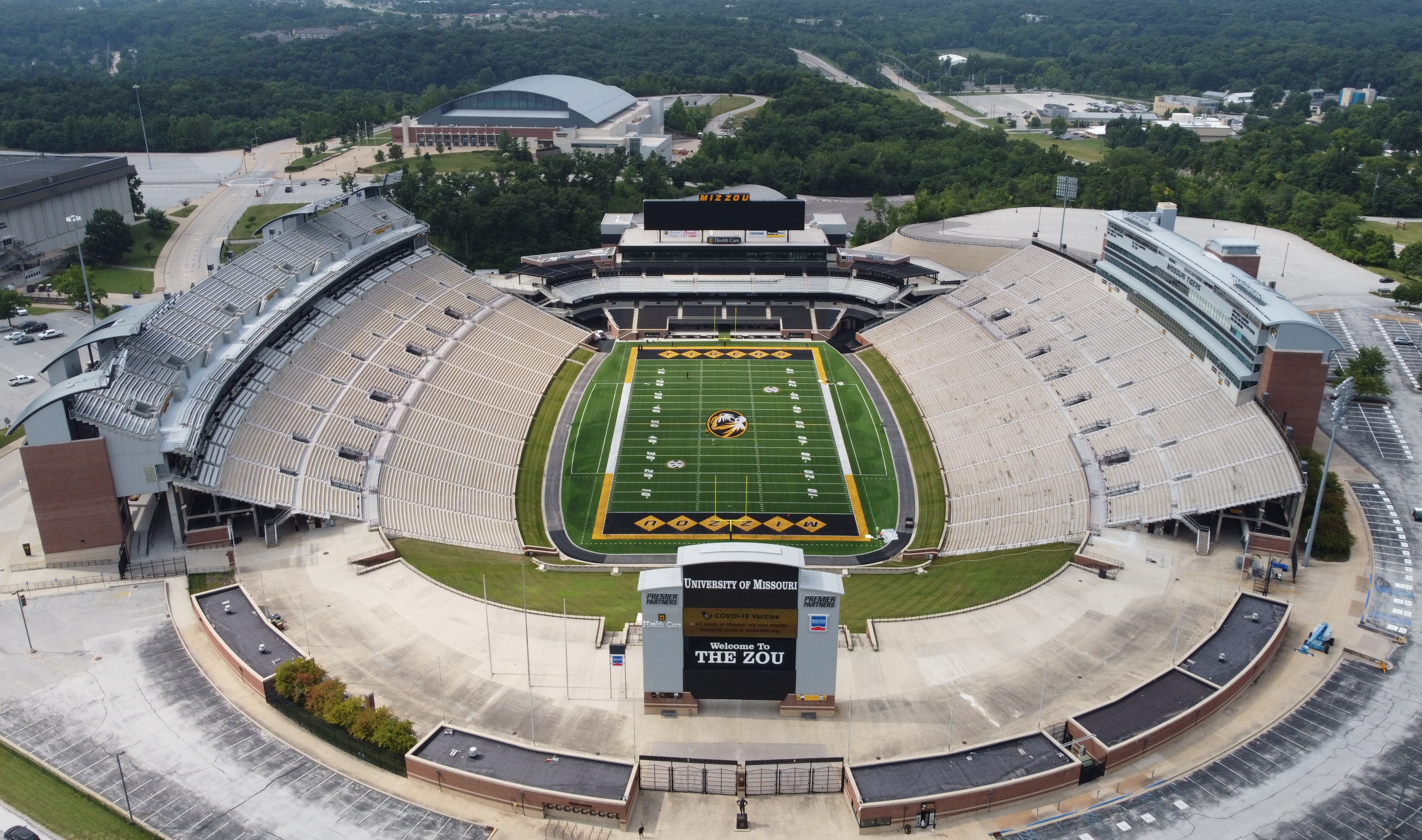
- Aerial view of Faurot Field taken in 2021

- Location in Missouri Location in the United States
- Location: 600 East Stadium Boulevard; Columbia, Missouri 65201
- Coordinates: 38°56′9″N 92°19′59″W
- Owner: University of Missouri
- Operator: University of Missouri
- Capacity: 63,609 (2026) Former capacity: List: 57,321 (2025); 60,168 (2018) 71,168 (2014–2017); 67,124 (2013); 71,004 (2009–2012); 68,349 (2003–2008); 68,174 (1998–2002); 62,023 (1978–1997, standing room to at least 75,300); 51,223 (1971–1977); 47,628 (1963–1970); 44,033 (1961–1962); 35,000 (1950–1960); 30,000 (1949); 25,000 (1926–1948)
- Surface: Grass (1926–1984, 1995–2002); Omniturf (1985–1994); FieldTurf (2003–2020); AstroTurf (2021–present)
- Record attendance: 75,298

Construction
- Groundbreaking: December 9, 1925; 100 years ago
- Opened: October 2, 1926; 100 years ago
- Renovated: 1978, 2003, 2012, 2019
- Expanded: 1949–1950, 1961–1965, 1971, 1978, 1996, 2003, 2009, 2014, 2026
- Cost: $525,000 ($9.55 million in 2025 dollars)
- Architects: Jamieson and Spearl (original); Ellerbe Becket (renovation)

Tenants
- Missouri Tigers football (NCAA) (1926–present)

Website
- mutigers.com/memorial-stadiumfaurot-field

Faurot Field (/fɔːˈroʊ/ faw-ROH, /fəˈroʊ/ fə-ROH) at Memorial Stadium is an outdoor sports stadium in Columbia, Missouri, United States, on the campus of the University of Missouri. It is primarily used for football and serves as the home field for the Missouri Tigers' program. It is the third-largest sports facility by seating capacity in the state of Missouri, behind The Dome at America's Center in St. Louis and Arrowhead Stadium in Kansas City. In 1972, Memorial Stadium's playing surface was named Faurot Field in honor of longtime coach Don Faurot.

Until 2012 it was the site of the annual "Providence Bowl" game between Hickman and Rock Bridge high schools, so named because both schools are located on Providence Road in Columbia, and Faurot is roughly equidistant between the two. This tradition stopped when Missouri joined the Southeastern Conference and conference scheduling made hosting the game more difficult. Faurot Field served as the host of Missouri State High School Activities Association (MSHSAA) football championships through 2024 before they were moved to Spratt Stadium at Missouri Western State University in St. Joseph.

The stadium is an early 20th century horseshoe-shaped stadium, with seating added on in the "open" (south) end zone. The original horseshoe is completed by a grass berm in the curved end, which is used for general admission on game days. The berm is famous for the giant block "M" made of painted white stones located behind the end zone. A paved path encircled the west, north and east sides of the field taking the place of the track, but was removed in 1994.

== Early history ==
Fundraising began in 1921 for a "Memorial Union" and a "Memorial Stadium" to be constructed at the university. The names of the two projects were a tribute to Mizzou alumni who lost their lives during World War I. Ground was broken on the site of the future stadium in December 1925. The site was a sizeable natural valley that lay between twin bluffs south of the campus. Original plans called for the stadium to seat 25,000, with proposed stages of expansion in capacity to 35,000, 55,000, 75,000 and 95,000. According to legend, a rock crusher and truck were buried during initial blasting, which still remain buried under the field.

Memorial Stadium was dedicated on October 2, 1926, to the memory of 112 alumni and students who lost their lives in World War I. The 25,000-seat stadium—the lower half of the current facility—was built with a 440-yard (400 m) track that circled the playing field. That first October game against Tulane was marred by rainstorms that washed out a bridge into Columbia coming from the western side of Missouri. While the game sold out, the field could not be sodded due to the wet conditions. Therefore, a surface of sawdust and tree bark was used, and "the Tigers and Green Wave played to a scoreless, mudpie tie", in the words of sportswriter Bob Broeg. Grass would be installed thenafter until the 1980s.

The highly recognizable rock 'M' of the northern end zone debuted on October 1, 1927, to a 13–6 victory over Kansas State. The monument was built by members of the freshman class using leftover rocks from the original stadium construction. The 90 ft (27 m) wide by 95 ft (29 m) high 'M' has continued to watch over the field and provide seating for fans since that day.

== Traditions ==
=== Rock M ===
The stadium's most historic and identifiable landmark is the rock "M" above the stadium's north end zone. The "M" is formed by whitewashed rocks and measures 90 feet wide by 95 feet high. The landmark was built in 1927 by a group of freshman students, using leftover rocks from the original construction of Memorial Stadium. This distinctive feature has not been immune to pranks, such as enterprising Nebraska or Kansas fans attempting to change the "M" to an "N" or a "K", but groundskeepers and students have in the past protected the landmark. One of the traditions of the football team is that seniors, after playing their final home game, take a rock from the "M" as a souvenir. The rock "M" is also whitewashed every year by incoming freshmen during welcoming activities prior to the first home game.

=== Goalposts to Harpos ===
After a major upset students have historically torn down their goalposts and carried them to Harpos in downtown Columbia.

=== MIZ-ZOU chant ===
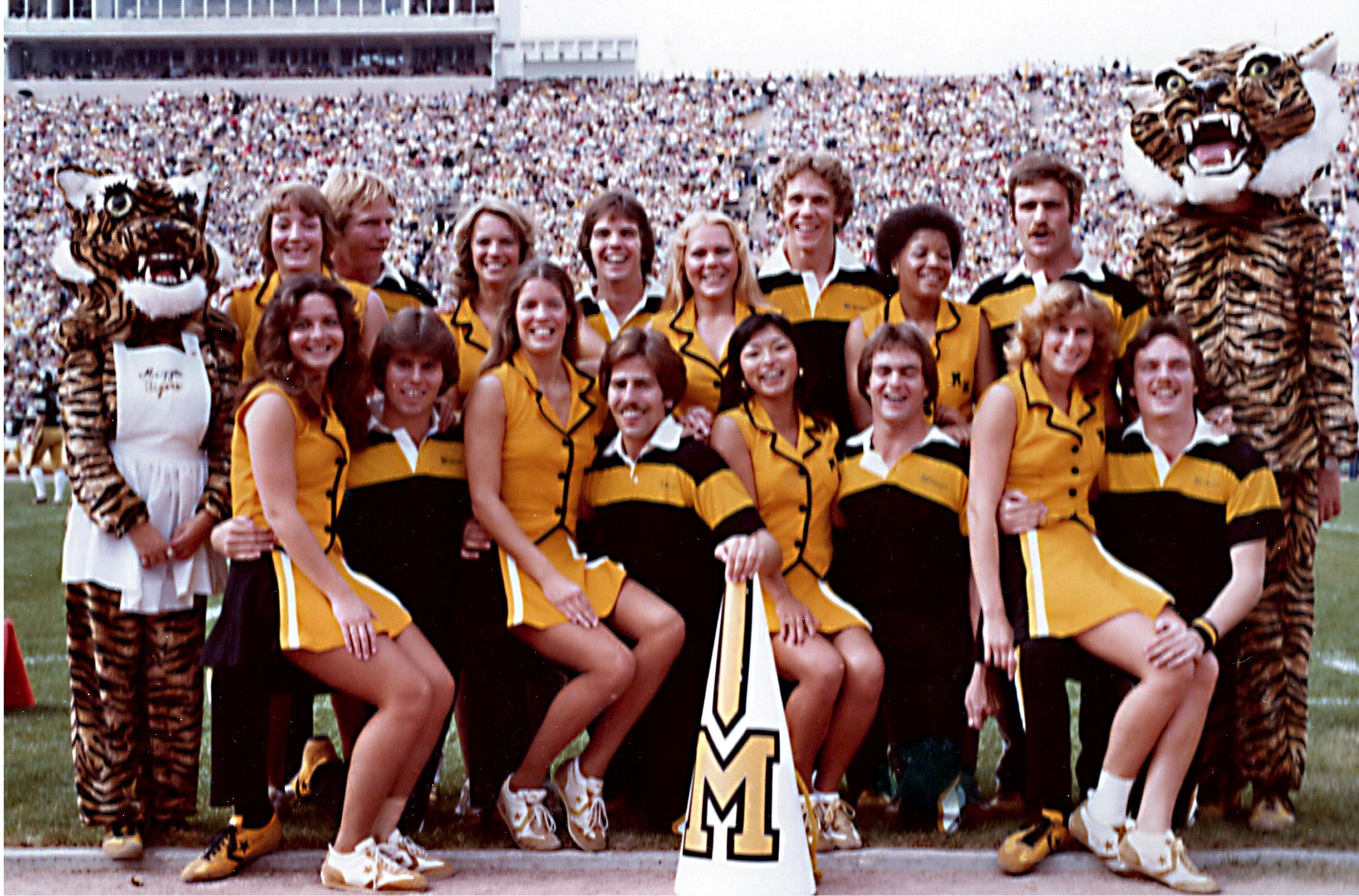
Mizzou Cheerleaders group photo on the sidelines of Faurot Field in 1977

The "M-I-Z," "Z-O-U," chant came about in 1976 after a game in Columbus, Ohio against Ohio State, famous for its seismic "OH/IO" chant. After an unexpectedly stunning 22–21 defeat of the Buckeyes and during the long bus-ride home, Missouri's cheerleaders were determined to come up with a signature chant equally awe-inspiring for home.

The nickname, "Mizzou," while quite old and well-known, was not often used to describe the University of Missouri by the late 1970s. Nonetheless Mini-Mizzou member Cedric Lemmie suggested MIZ-ZOU as something that might work and the cheerleaders agreed to devise a plan to get it started. According to Jess Bushyhead, cheerleading varsity co-captain (1976–1978) the plan was implemented during the next home game against the North Carolina Tar Heels on October 2, 1976. During the first half Marching Mizzou split in two and occupied the lower student section and the lower Alumni section. Unfortunately, the attempts were too scrambled and mostly failed to take off. So during halftime, Bushyhead deployed the cheerleaders, megaphones and PA bullhorns in hand, to get up into the stands to instruct alumni, "When you hear 'MIZ! from the students across the field, answer 'ZOU!" Students were to listen for that "ZOU" from the alumni, then return that with an even louder "MIZ!" This tepid start caught fire and by the end of 1976/77 football and basketball seasons, "MIZ-ZOU" had entered Missouri legend as the primal scream of Mizzou Pride. Nearly half a century later you can travel almost anywhere in Missouri and yell, "MIZ!" and any number of perfect strangers will return "ZOU!"

Today the chant is often started by the "Big MO" drum. The student section yells out "M-I-Z" and the alumni section responds "Z-O-U". This tradition has expanded to Tiger first downs; the PA announcer says, "First down, M-I-Z..." and the crowd finishes with "Z-O-U!"

== Expansion and renovation ==
=== 1949–1978 seating expansions ===
Throughout its history, numerous expansion and renovation projects have taken place at Faurot Field. Beginning in 1949, MU expanded Memorial Stadium by double-decking the grandstands between the 30 yard lines on the east side and between the south 30 and north 40 yard lines. A new press box was added on the west side of the stadium. A second project in 1961 filled in the northeast and northwest sections of the second tier and two final projects in 1963 and 1965 completed the second tier construction with new southwest and southeast stands. In 1967 the MU Board of Curators awarded contracts totaling $460,000 for construction of a new three story press box. The new press box was completed for the start of the 1969 season.

In 1974, Athletic Director Mel Sheehan studied the possibility of lowering the field to add additional seats on each side closer to the sidelines, but the plan did not move forward due to a prevalence of bedrock just below the playing surface.

During the summer of 1978, the south end zone (open end of the original horseshoe) was enclosed with 10,800 permanent seats, which brought total permanent seating capacity to 62,023 and overall seating capacity to around 75,000.

=== 1985 Omniturf ===
On May 18, 1985, Mizzou replaced the natural grass surface with a new artificial surface called Omniturf, which was also installed at Autzen Stadium (Oregon) and Martin Stadium (Washington State). The conversion was completed on August 30. Mizzou was the last school in the Big Eight Conference to switch from grass to artificial turf. Six of the other seven conference schools switched to artificial turf in the early 1970s, and Iowa State followed suit in 1975 when the Cyclones' new Jack Trice Stadium opened. The first game on the new artificial turf was a 27–23 loss to Northwestern University played on September 14, 1985. The Tigers went on to finish 0–7 at home during the 1985 season. The OmniTurf surface became infamous to Tiger fans as the "lousy field" on which The Fifth Down Game was played on October 6, 1990. The surface was also panned by opponents as well. In 1992, Big Eight Conference coaches issued a statement that read, in part: "Big Eight Conference football coaches wanted to report that the football field at the University of Missouri is a detriment to the home and visiting teams and takes away from the integrity of the game played on such a field."

=== 1990s ===
On September 18, 1994, The Rolling Stones performed, during their Voodoo Lounge Tour, before 45,000 fans at Memorial Stadium in a concert that raised almost $100,000 for the conversion of the Omniturf surface back to natural grass. The final game on the infamous Omniturf surface was played on November 19 of that same year against the University of Kansas, a 31–14 Kansas victory. Mizzou's all-time record on the Omiturf was a disappointing 20–38–3.

The artificial Omniturf playing surface was removed and replaced with natural grass over the summer of 1995. Legendary Coach Don Faurot put down the last piece of sod as a symbolic gesture. Faurot had helped to lay the sod of the original playing surface in 1926. He died later that year in October, during Homecoming week. As part of the installation of the new playing surface, grass-covered terraces were extended up from the field to the seating area, where they met a new low brick wall that was designed to give Memorial Stadium a traditional college ambiance. The brick wall also honors the greatest figures in Tiger football (including Faurot, Kellen Winslow and Dan Devine) by listing the team's honored numbers on each panel. The first game on the new natural grass resulted in a 28–7 victory for Mizzou over North Texas. The game was also historic as the first game played under permanent lights—previously, night games only were played under temporary lights paid for by television broadcasters, and as part of the renovations four large light stanchions were erected outside each corner of the stadium.

In 1996, four permanent light towers were installed, allowing Missouri to begin playing night games on a regular basis. The first game under these new lights was on September 14, 1996, when the Memphis Tigers defeated Missouri 19–16.

1997 brought a major renovation that included the installation of the Diamond Vision video board above the Rock "M" at the north end zone. The video board measured 21 feet high by 27 feet wide, and the screen utilized Clearvision Signal Processing. The concourses were also refurbished, with new signage and expanded concessions. New ticket booths were constructed, and the north entrance was reconfigured with more brick work to accent the new brick wall installed at field level in 1995.

=== 2000–2012: pre-SEC entry ===
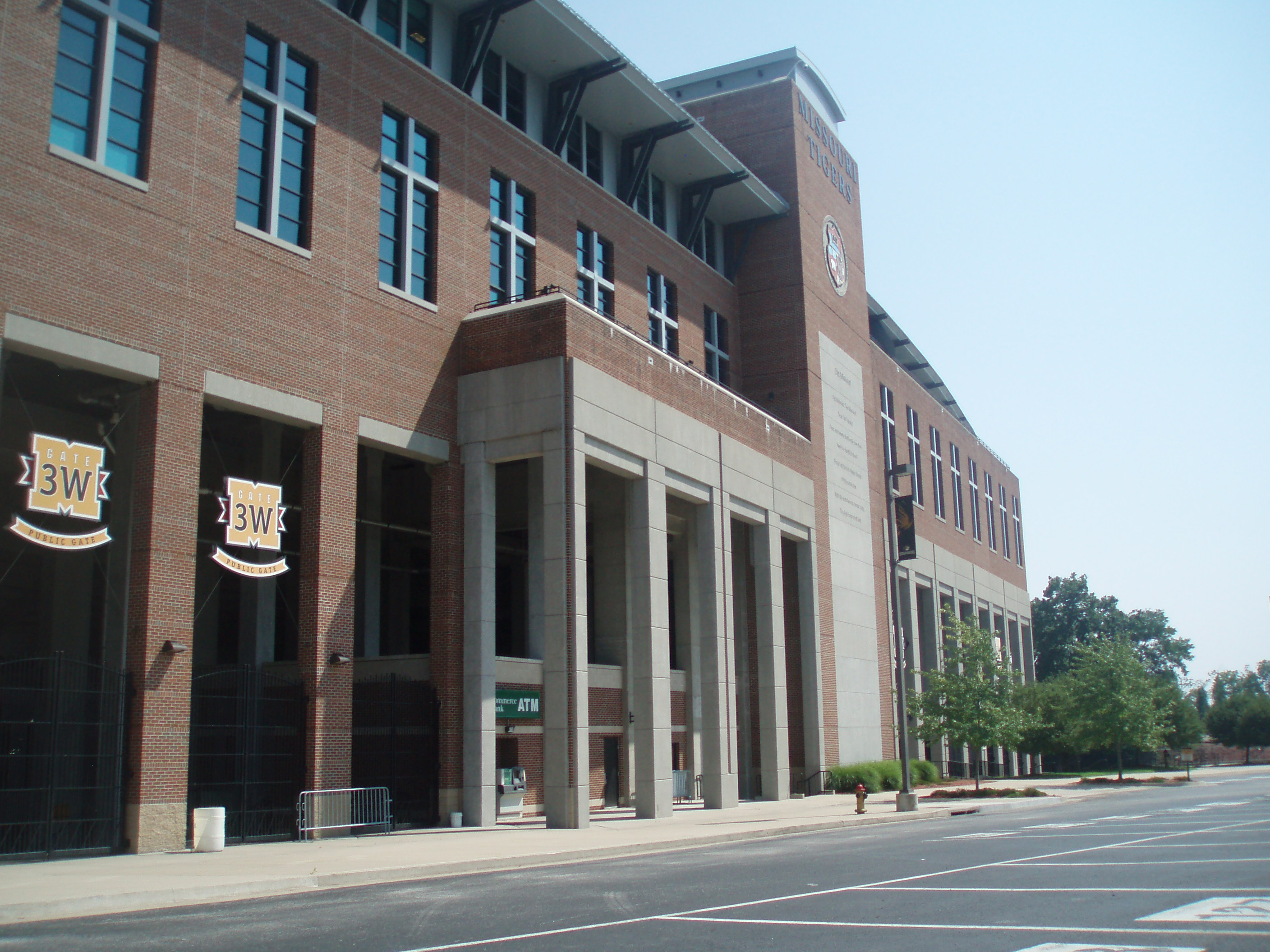
The new 15-story state-of-the-art facility containing press boxes, suites, and a restaurant was constructed in 2000

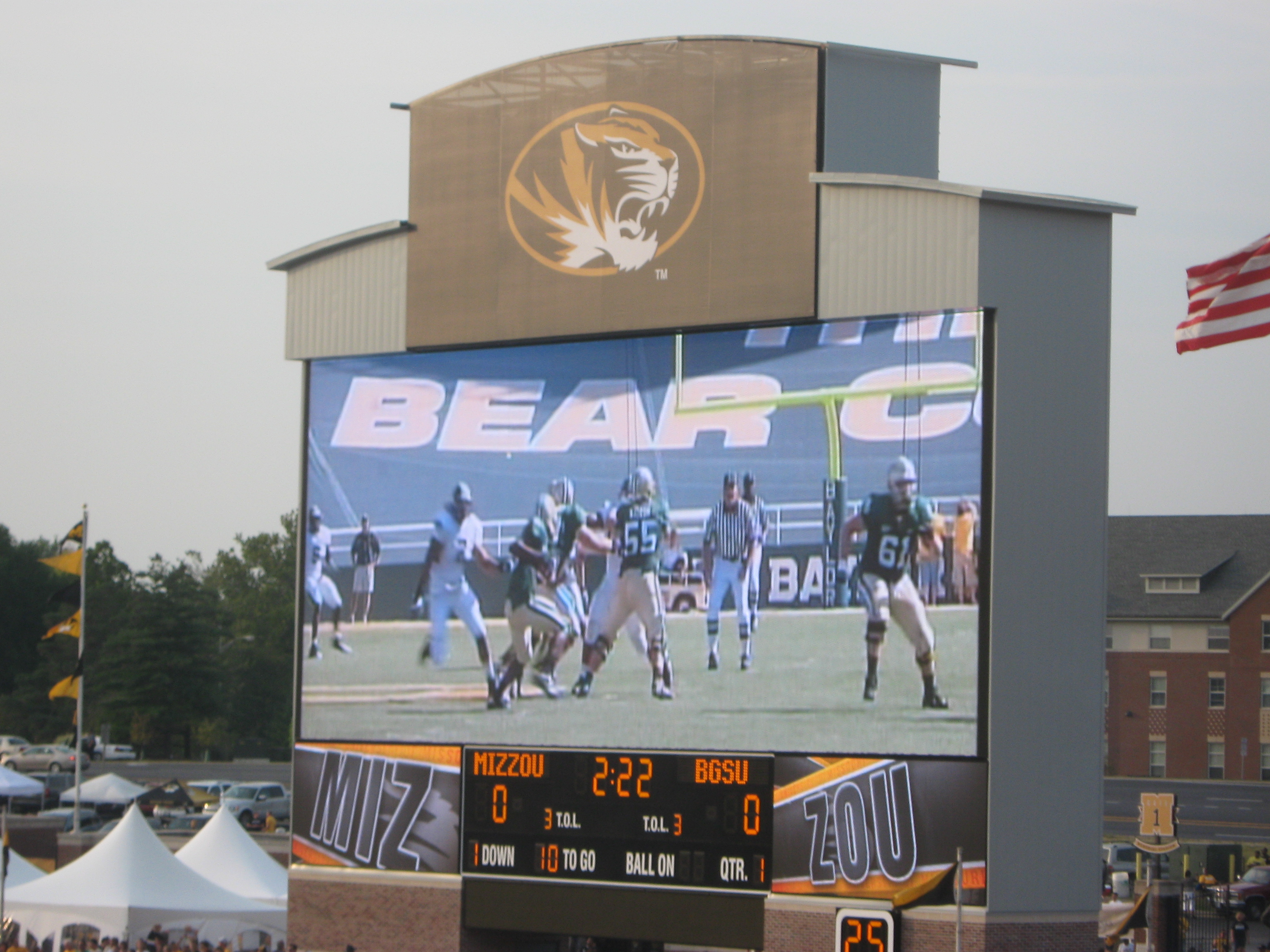
The new Daktronics video board installed before the start of the 2009-2010 football season

Prior to the start of the 1999 football season, construction of a new press box and luxury suites began. The $13.1 million 15-story tower was completed in August 2000, and it contained state-of-the-art facilities for the coaches and media, as well as several executive suites, hundreds of premium club seats and a restaurant. FieldTurf replaced the natural grass in 2003. With installation of the new FieldTurf, the traditional "M" was removed from the 50 yard line of the field, and it was replaced by the oval "Power Tiger" logo at the center of the field.

In 2005, the south end's antiquated auxiliary scoreboards were replaced with new ones, as well as a second high-definition video monitor.

In 2009, the university installed a new $5 million 30x80 foot north end zone scoreboard with updated video capabilities and new sound system. The new north end zone video board and audio upgrades replaced the 10-year-old DiamondVision equipment. At the time of construction, it was the fourth largest scoreboard in the Big 12 Conference, behind Godzillatron at Texas' DKR Stadium, the south scoreboard at Owen Field in Norman, Oklahoma, and "12th Man TV" at Kyle Field in College Station. When the Tigers entered Southeastern Conference play, the Faurot Field video scoreboard was the ninth largest in the SEC.

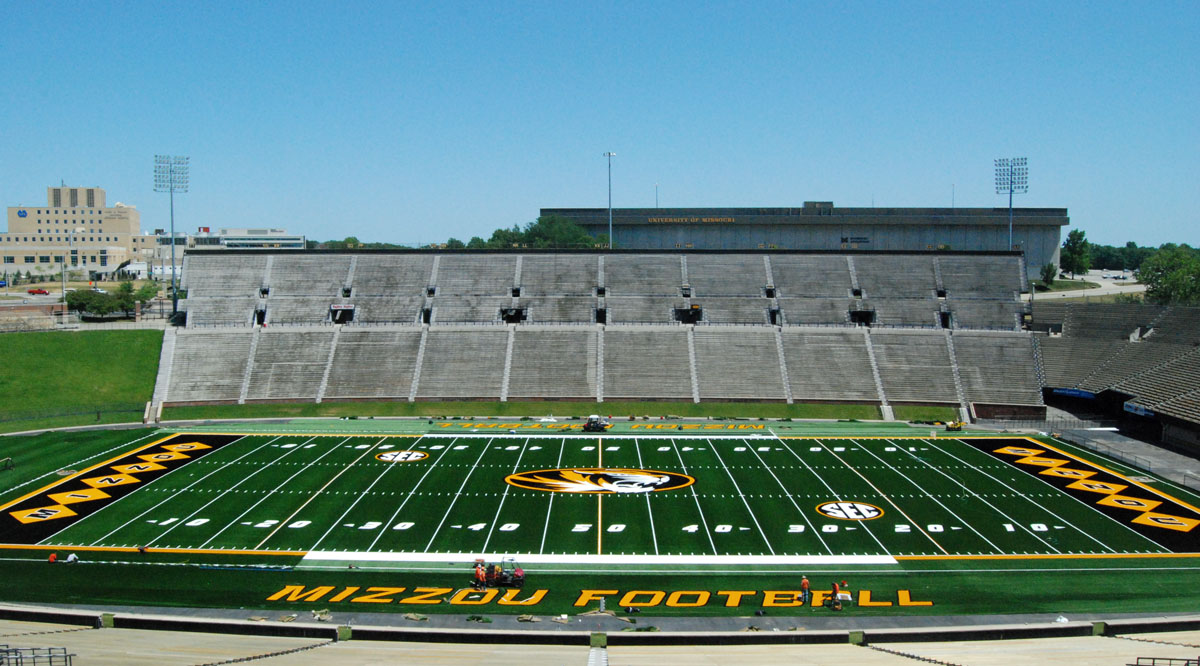
Press box view of the redesigned FieldTurf surface for the 2012 season

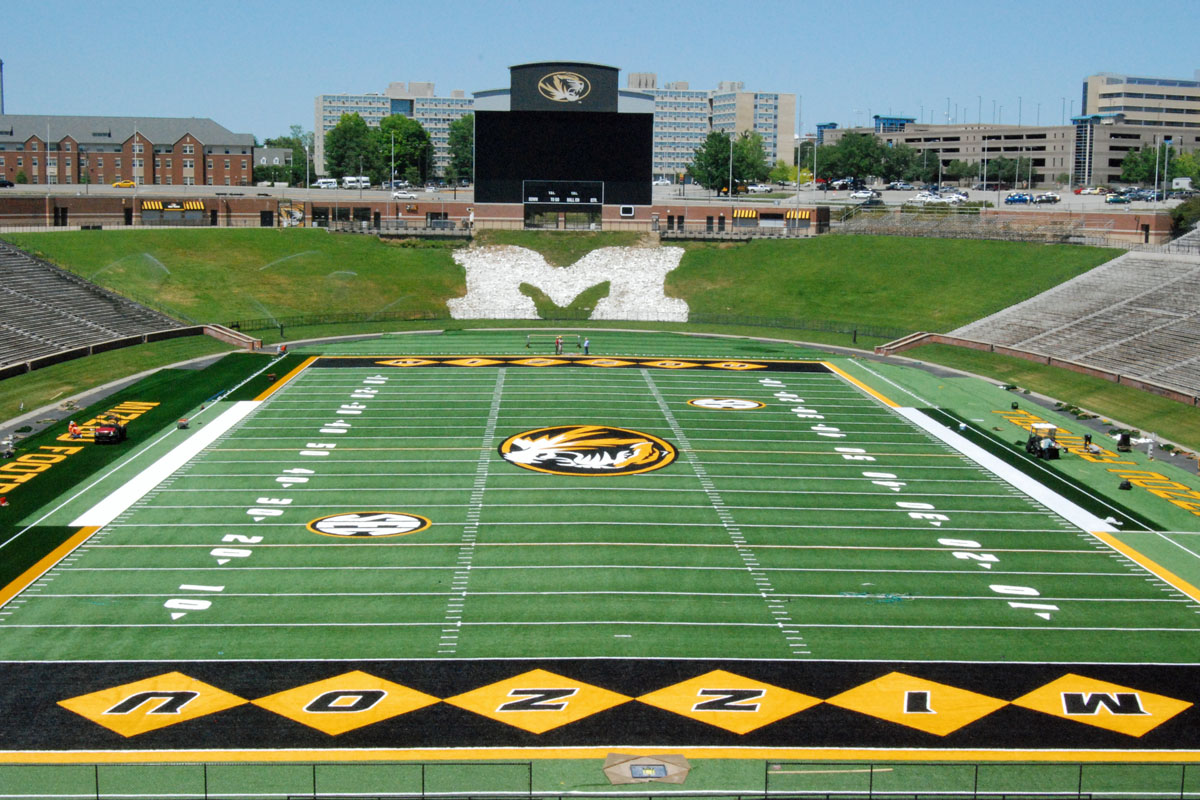
End zone view of the redesigned FieldTurf surface for the 2012 season

In 2012, Athletic Director Mike Alden announced a $1.5 million modification plan for Faurot Field in anticipation of increased game attendance in the SEC. Changes to the stadium included a redesigned FieldTurf surface featuring a larger "Power Tiger" logo at midfield, SEC conference logos, black and gold "M-I-Z-Z-O-U" end zone diamonds to replace the previous white "M-I-S-S-O-U-R-I" diamonds, and gold trim surrounding the field. Additionally, Marching Mizzou was moved from the south end zone to the southeast corner of the seating bowl, and a "Touchdown Terrace" premium seating section was added to the south end zone.

=== 2012–present: SEC entry ===
As part of the entry into the SEC, renovation plans were expanded to increase the current capacity by approximately 6,000 seats at a planned cost of $72 million: In 2013, the west side press box complex was renovated, moving all press facilities to the sixth floor and converting the existing space to new premium suites. In addition, the "Rock M" and grass berm were moved closer to the north end zone and the northern concourse was expanded. For the 2014 season, an upper balcony was completed on the east side of the stadium, providing 5,200 general admission seats and 800 club seats as well as adding two elevators, new stairs and a new entryway for the student section.

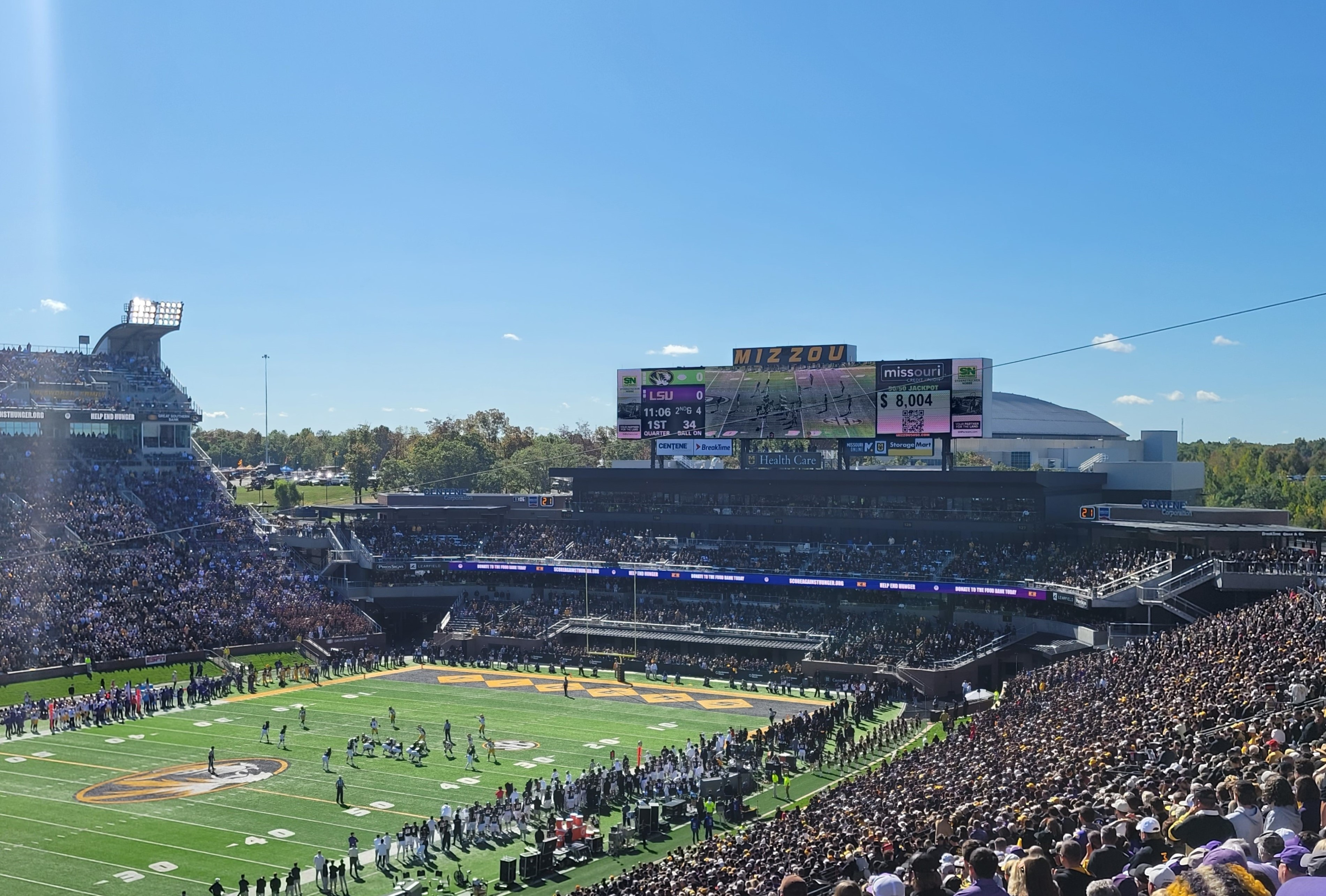
The renovated south end zone in 2023.

Mizzou approved an $89 million renovation of the south end zone at the end of the 2017 season. The complex includes 16 suites, field- and stand-level club decks, as well as general seating. A new video board and control room was also constructed, and full concessions and restrooms were added to an expanded concourse: previously, fans in the south stand had to go to either sideline stand to use the toilet and the only refreshments offered were chips and bottled drinks from portable carts. The showpiece of the SEZ project was an entirely new base for the football program featuring new locker rooms for both Mizzou and their opponents, a football-specific weight room, meeting rooms, medical and nutritional centers, and offices for the Tiger football staff. When finished the overall capacity of the stadium decreased to 62,622 and was completed before the 2019 season.

In 2023, the university's Board of Curators approved a plan to renovate the north end zone in phases, starting with the installation of a new video board and sound system during the 2023-24 off-season. Additional elements of the plan include upgrades to the north entry gate and a new tunnel under Stadium Boulevard, new LED floodlights with light-show capability, concourse upgrades such as additional restrooms, expanded concession stands, and free WiFi for fans, plus a new Tiger Team Store. The finished product will include multiple tiers of premium seating, field-level luxury boxes, and a new Rock M Club located under a rebuilt north hill. A reduced general admission hill will be retained, but flanked by club seats on both sides and elevated away from the field of play. The north end zone is designed to be a self-contained facility which can be used for conferences, university functions, or private events outside of game day. The Board of Curators gave final approval for the $250 million renovation on September 12, 2024, with the project set to begin on November 30, 2024, and be completed in time for the start of the 2026 football season, which will be the stadium's 100th anniversary. Once completed, the capacity of the stadium is expected to be around 65,000. On February 10, 2026, Mizzou Athletics announced the intent to secure corporate naming rights for the stadium and remove "Memorial" from the name in order to generate additional revenue. The University plans to simultaneously consult with various groups to honor and preserve the origins behind the Memorial designation.

In August 2026, the Faurot Field Centennial Project, headlined by the new North End Zone structure, was completed a week ahead of schedule.

== Record crowds ==
The stadium's current capacity is 62,621, though in the past the stadium has been able to hold more fans. The record attendance for Faurot Field is 75,298 when Missouri hosted Penn State on October 4, 1980.

=== All-time largest crowds ===
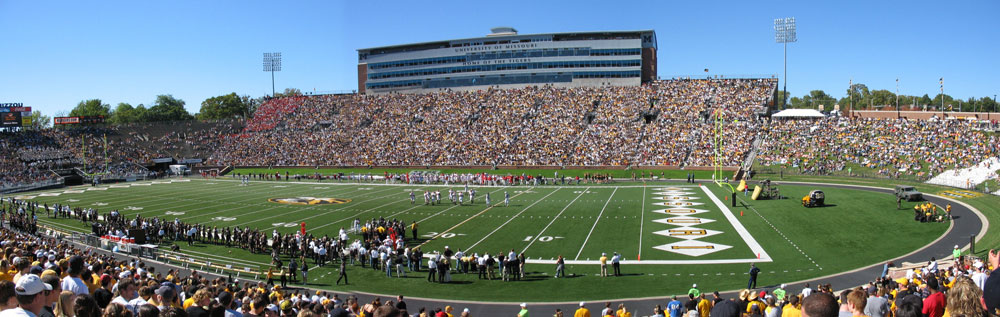
The crowd at Faurot Field in 2007

1. 75,298, vs. Penn State, October 4, 1980
2. 75,136, vs. Texas, September 29, 1979
3. 74,575, vs. Nebraska, November 3, 1979
4. 73,655, vs. Alabama, September 16, 1978
5. 72,348, vs. Nebraska, October 15, 1983
6. 72,333, vs. Colorado, October 18, 1980
7. 72,001, vs. Nebraska, October 24, 1981
8. 71,291, vs. Oklahoma, November 17, 1979
9. 71,168, vs. Georgia, October 11, 2014
10. 71,168, vs. Arkansas, November 28, 2014

Largest crowds since 1995 (when possible seating was reduced to 68,174 capacity from 75,000). For the 2008 season official seating capacity was increased to 68,349. For the 2009 season official seating capacity was increased to 71,004. For the 2013 season official seating capacity was decreased to 67,124 while construction of the East side of the stadium was completed. The construction of the upper deck completed for the 2014 season brought the stadium's capacity to 71,168.

1. 71,168, vs. Arkansas, November 28, 2014
2. 71,168, vs. Georgia, October 11, 2014
3. 71,004, vs. Alabama, October 13, 2012
4. 71,004, vs. Arizona State, September 15, 2012
5. 71,004, vs. Georgia, September 8, 2012
6. 71,004, vs. Iowa State, October 15, 2011
7. 71,004, vs. Oklahoma, October 23, 2010
8. 71,004, vs. Texas, October 24, 2009
9. 70,767, vs. Florida, October 10, 2015
10. 70,079, vs. Connecticut, September 19, 2015

== See also ==
- List of NCAA Division I FBS football stadiums
