= University of Missouri Graduate School =

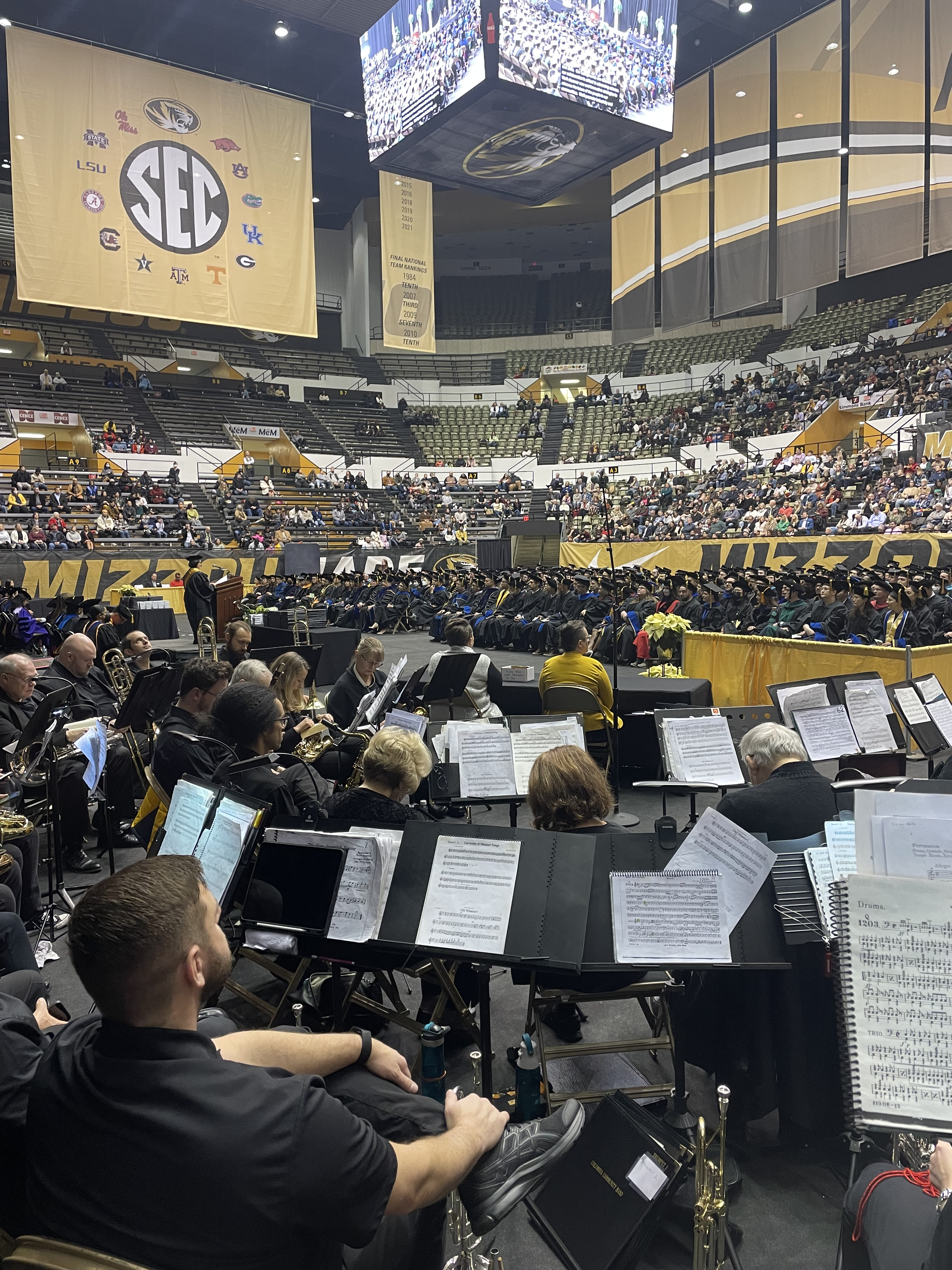
- Graduation in December 2022
- Type: Public
- Established: 1839; 187 years ago
- Dean: Jeni Hart
- Postgraduates: 5,731
- Location: Columbia, Missouri
- Mascot: Tiger
- Website: gradschool.missouri.edu

The University of Missouri Graduate School is one of the 13 academic schools and colleges of the University of Missouri. It oversees master's, education specialist, and doctoral degree candidates in almost 150 programs campus wide. In addition, the university offers professional degrees through the School of Medicine, School of Veterinary Medicine, College of Health Sciences, and School of Law.
