= University of Missouri College of Arts and Science =

College of Arts and Science
- Type: Public
- Established: 1841; 185 years ago
- Parent institution: University of Missouri
- Dean: Cooper Drury
- Faculty: 500
- Undergraduates: 8,000
- Location: Columbia, Missouri, USA; 38°56′43″N 92°19′38″W
- Nicknames: A&S
- Website: coas.missouri.edu

The University of Missouri College of Arts and Science (A&S) is the liberal arts and sciences unit of the University of Missouri in Columbia, Missouri. Established in 1841 and with over 8,000 students, the college is the oldest and the largest college at the university, and it is the largest academic unit in the state of Missouri. The college encompasses 37 departments and programs, including the University of Missouri School of Music. The college is located in more than 50 buildings throughout the main campus of the university. The headquarters is located in Lowry Hall on 9th Street.

== Departments ==
The 37 departments at the college are:

- Aerospace Studies
- Anthropology
- Architectural Studies
- Biological Sciences
- Black Studies
- Chemistry
- Chinese Studies
- Classics, Archaeology, and Religion
- Communication
- Economics
- English
- General Studies
- Geography
- Geological Sciences
- History
- Interdisciplinary Studies
- International Studies
- Japanese Studies
- Kinder Institute on Constitutional Democracy
- Korean Studies
- Linguistics
- Mathematics
- Military Science and Leadership
- Office of Multidisciplinary Degrees
- Peace Studies
- Philosophy
- Physics and Astronomy
- Psychological Sciences
- School of Languages, Literatures, and Cultures
- School of Music
- School of Visual Studies
- Sociology
- Statistics
- Textile & Apparel Management
- Theatre & Performance Studies
- Truman School of Government and Public Affairs
- Women's and Gender Studies
