= Truman School of Public Affairs =

Public affairs school of the University of Missouri

Coordinates: 38.94617°N 92.326934°W

Harry S Truman School of Government and Public Affairs
- Type: Public
- Established: 2001
- Parent institution: University of Missouri
- Director: Lael Kieser
- Academic staff: 87 faculty
- Location: Columbia, Missouri, United States
- Campus: Urban, college town
- Website: truman.missouri.edu

The Harry S Truman School of Government and Public Affairs is one of twenty-one schools and colleges at the University of Missouri. Established in 2001, it was previously known as the Department of Public Administration. The school mission is to "advance the knowledge and practice of governance in Missouri, the nation, and beyond by informing public policy, educating for ethical leadership in public service, and fostering democratic discourse among citizens, policy makers, and scholars." As part of the College of Arts and Science, the school awards master's, and doctoral degrees. The school is named after Missourian and U.S. President, Harry S. Truman. It was ranked the 38th best public affairs program by U.S. News & World Report in 2020.

== Degree programs ==
=== Undergraduate ===
==== Bachelor's degrees ====
- Bachelor of Arts in Political Science
- Bachelor of Arts in Public Administration and Policy

==== Minors ====
- Defense and Strategic Studies
- Canadian Studies
- Political Science

=== Graduate ===
==== Master's degrees ====
- Master of Arts in Defense and Strategic Studies
- Master of Public Affairs

==== Doctorate degrees ====
- Ph.D. in Public Affairs
- Ph.D. in Political Science

==== Certificate programs ====
The following focus areas offer 12 credit hour programs:

- Nonprofit Management
- Public Management
- Public Policy
- Organizational Change and Conflict Management (online only)
- Global Public Affairs (online only)
