= University of Missouri College of Human Environmental Sciences =

Coordinates: 38°56′40.92″N 92°19′29.28″W

- Type: Public
- Established: 1960
- Parent institution: University of Missouri
- Dean: J. Sanford Rikoon
- Location: Columbia, Missouri, United States
- Campus: Urban, college town
- Website: hes.missouri.edu

The College of Human Environmental Sciences was a school of environmental science, and one of the major academic divisions of the University of Missouri in Columbia, Missouri. It awarded undergraduate and graduate degrees and was the only human environmental science college in Missouri.

On February 8, 2021, the University of Missouri announced the academic restructuring of the College of Human Environmental Sciences that, effective August 1, 2021, all departments from the college will merge with other schools and colleges across the campus.

== History ==
After serving as interim dean for two years J. Sanford Rikoon was appointed dean in 2017.

In 2018, the Center for Body Image Research and Policy was established as part of the college.
