= Memorial Union (University of Missouri) =

Coordinates: 38°56′42″N 92°19′31″W

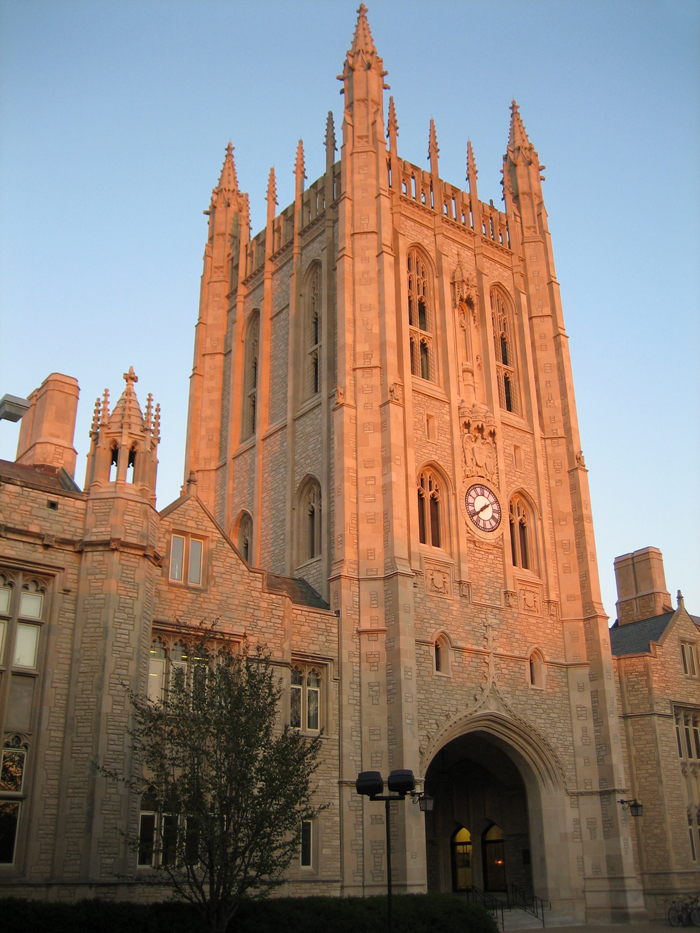
- The bell tower of Memorial Union
- Interactive map of the Memorial Union area

General information
- Type: Student union
- Location: Columbia, Missouri, United States
- Completed: 1926; 100 years ago
- Renovated: 1959; 67 years ago 1963; 63 years ago

Design and construction
- Architecture firm: Jamieson and Spearl

Memorial Union serves as a community center for the University of Missouri by providing meeting rooms, technology centers, dining facilities, and playing host to many special events. The facility was built in three stages between 1923 and 1963.

It was designed by Jamieson and Spearl, which designed most of the campus buildings built between 1902 and the 1950s.

== History ==
Walter Miller's 1919 commencement address called for a memorial to the university's lost soldiers in World War I. Fund raising began in 1921 for a "Memorial Union" and a "Memorial Stadium" to be constructed at the university. The names of the two projects were a tribute to Mizzou alumni who lost their lives during World War I. John Pickard, professor of art history led the campaign. Students were encouraged to pledge $100 toward the project, and alumni were encouraged to pledge at least $200. After more than $238,000 in pledges, the official groundbreaking took place in November 1921.

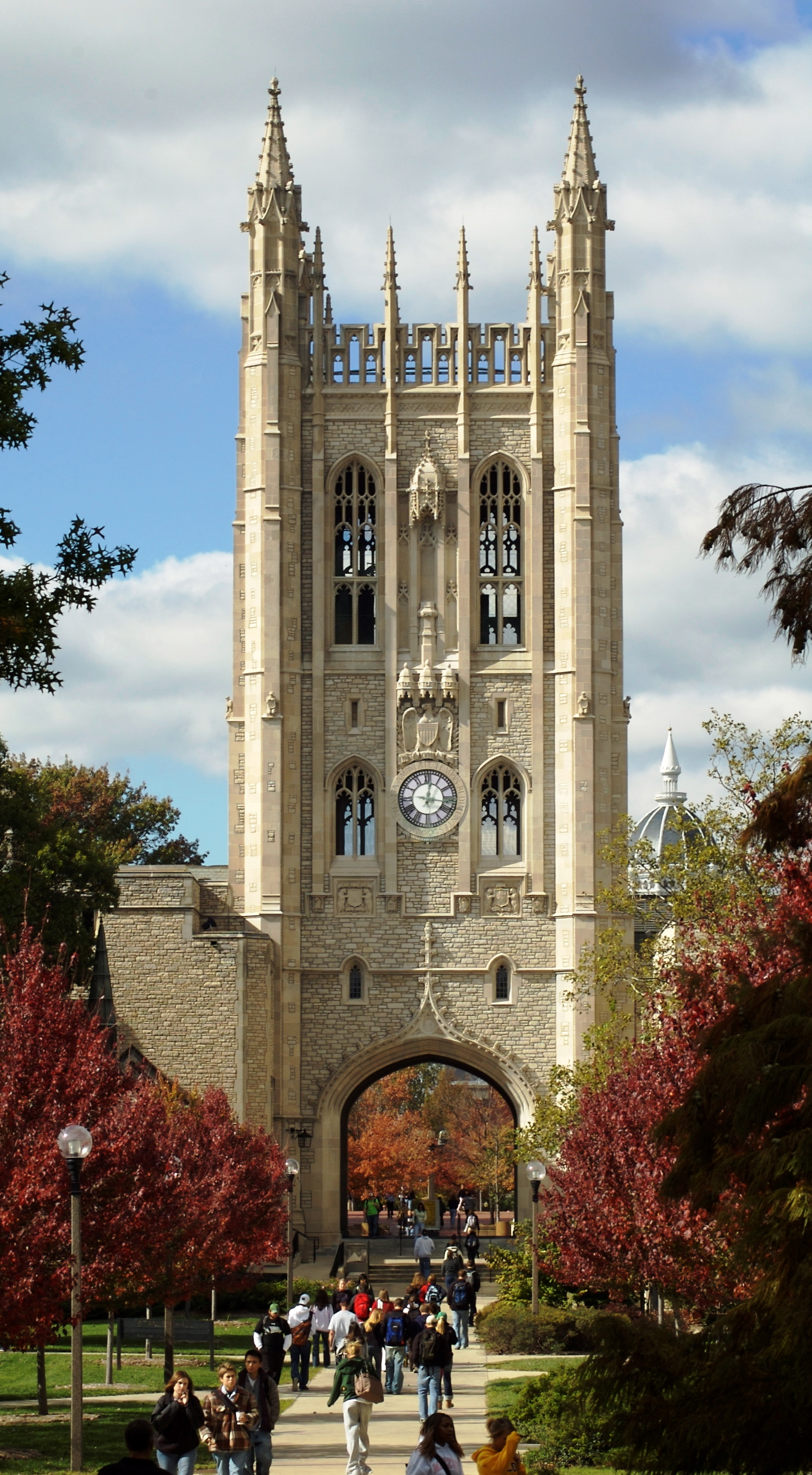
A view of the Union from the East.

Plans for Memorial Union called for one wing for men and one wing for women. Each of the proposed wings would cost $200,000, and the two would be linked by a Gothic tower. The Simon Construction Company began work on the tower in January 1923, and the first shipments of cut stone for the tower began arriving in 1924. Construction of the tower was completed after three years and dedicated in November 1926.

Groundbreaking for the North Wing took place as part of 1930 Homecoming activities; however, the Great Depression soon halted construction with only the foundation in place. The tower then stood alone for nearly twenty-five years.

After World War II, plans were revived for the North Wing, construction began in June 1951, and it was completed for occupation in September 1952. The next major addition to the still unfinished complex was the addition of the A. P. Green Chapel in 1959. The South Wing of Memorial Union was finally completed in August 1963.

== Traditions ==
Memorial Union honors 117 MU men who lost their lives in service to the United States during World War I. Their names are inscribed on the inside walls of the tower archway. In a tradition that dates back to a time when most men wore hats, whenever one walks beneath the archway, they are to tip their hat as a sign of respect to their deceased brothers; in addition, every student speaks at a whisper under the archway. A plaque was later added inside the north wing in which the names of 338 MU men who lost their lives in World War II were inscribed.
