= Trulaske College of Business =

Coordinates: 38°56′43″N 92°19′44″W

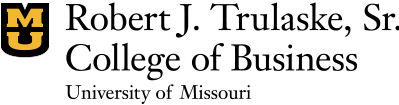
- Type: Public
- Established: 1914
- Parent institution: University of Missouri
- Endowment: $73.9 Million
- Dean: Balaji Rajagopalan
- Faculty: 64
- Undergraduates: 3,800+
- Postgraduates: 365
- Location: Columbia, Missouri, U.S.
- Website: business.missouri.edu

The Robert J. Trulaske Sr. College of Business, more commonly known as the Trulaske College of Business, is the second largest academic division at the University of Missouri in Columbia, Missouri.

== History ==
The College of Business was established as a senior professional school on January 19, 1914 as the School of Commerce. The first faculty was appointed on February 18, 1914 with professor Herbert J. Davenport as the first dean. The College of Business's prestigious donor organization was named The Herbert J. Davenport Society to pay tribute to the first dean. The name of the school was changed to the School of Commerce and Public Administration on May 31, 1916, and later that year, Dean Davenport resigned to accept a professorship in economics at Cornell University. The name of the school was changed again on January 23, 1917 to the School of Business and Public Administration.

With a wide course offering, students may enroll in a number of classes that they find applicable. Notably, Management 4970 is a required course that every major must enroll in.

During the early stages of the college, there was some controversy regarding the nature of the courses that would be offered. Some university faculty favored practical vocational courses, and others favored general, cultural, or theoretical courses. Dean Davenport and Thorstein Veblen, both professors of economics, eventual won out in their belief that all courses should have a theoretical purpose over and above their practical value; however, all courses offered were to also maintain a degree of practical value.

The College's business programs were among the first in the nation to be accredited. The American Association of Collegiate Schools of Business (AACSB) was established in 1916, and in 1926 the MU College of Business became the first public business school in Missouri to earn accreditation from AACSB. Only 14 institutions nationwide had been granted membership in AACSB prior to MU. The college was also a leader in offering the PhD degree in business-related fields.

The College of Business has made its home in several buildings throughout its history. The original Commerce Building was the north part of Swallow Hall on Francis Quadrangle. On January 29, 1927, the school moved to the former quarters of the law school, which was renamed the Business and Public Administration Building. This location is now part of the Donald W. Reynolds Journalism Institute. Middlebush Hall was constructed in 1959 as the new home for the college, and it was named for Frederick A. Middlebush, who had served as Dean of the School of Business and Public Administration and President of the University.

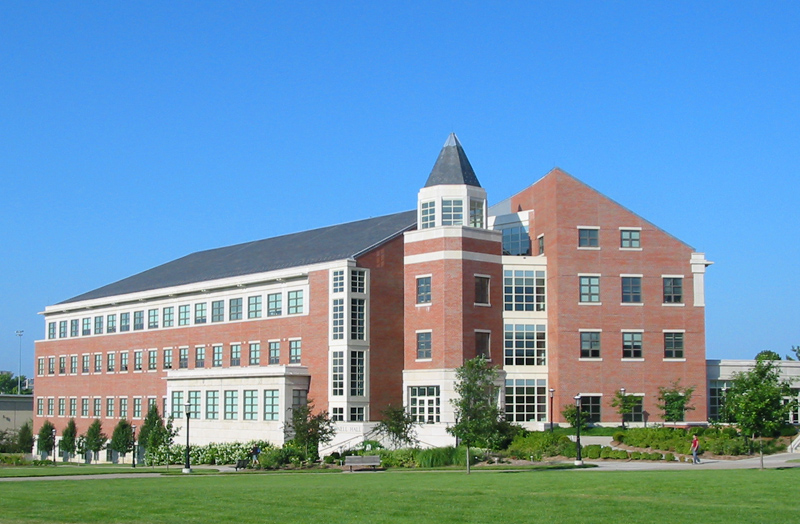
Cornell Hall, located on the Mel Carnahan Quadrangle, is the home of the Trulaske College of Business

By 1990, enrollment at the college had significantly outgrown the more than 30-year-old Middlebush Hall, and classes had to be held in several other buildings. MU began to draft plans for the a new business building in 1994, and on September 18, 1999, the university broke ground on a new home for the College of Business, and it would be twice the size of Middlebush when completed. The 150,000-square-foot (14,000 m^{2}) Cornell Hall was completed in 2002 at a cost of nearly $30 million. The state-of-the-art facility is named for Harry M. Cornell Jr., who is chairman emeritus of Leggett & Platt. Cornell is 1950 graduate of the college, and he and his wife have donated approximately $7 million to the college.

On October 19, 2007, the University of Missouri announced that its College of Business is now officially named the Robert J. Trulaske Sr. College of Business. The change comes following a series of large gifts from Geraldine Trulaske, in honor of her late husband, Robert J. Trulaske Sr., founder of True Manufacturing. The College of Business is one of only two named academic divisions at the University of Missouri. The other named division is the Sinclair School of Nursing.

In 2010, Joan Gabel, former Florida State University Department of Risk Management/Insurance chairwoman, became the new dean for the College of Business. Gabel replaced Bruce Walker, who served as MU's College of Business dean for 19 years.

On Jan. 1, 2017, Ajay Vinzé became the new dean for the College of Business. Vinzé came to the university after nearly 20 years in various administrative roles in the W. P. Carey School of Business at Arizona State University.

On Dec. 20, 2021, Christopher Robert became the interim dean for the College of Business. Interim Dean Christopher Robert served as the associate dean for graduate programs and research from 2017 to 2021 here at the Trulaske College of Business.

On July 5, 2023, Balaji Rajagopalan became the dean for the College of Business. Previously, Rajagopalan was named dean of the College of Business at Northern Illinois University in Dekalb County, Illinois in 2016. Before joining NIU, Rajagopalan served as the director and Toudy Chair in Entrepreneurship and Innovation at the Sam and Irene Black School of Business at Penn State Behrend in Erie, Pennsylvania, and was pro-vice chancellor and dean of Galgotias University in India. Before that, he served as a professor and associate dean of the School of Business Administration at Oakland University School of Business. He also was an assistant professor at Illinois State University in Normal, Illinois, and Southern Arkansas University in Magnolia, Arkansas.

== MBA programs ==
The Trulaske College of Business runs two MBA programs, the standard full-time online (Crosby MBA) program and a new executive MBA program, execMBA, that was launched in August 2012.

=== Crosby MBA program ===
The Trulaske College of Business is home to the Gordon E. Crosby Jr. MBA Program. In recent years, the Crosby MBA program has climbed steadily in rankings. The MBA program is known for its hands on application of theory through the use of cross-functional teams, case studies, real-world projects, class interaction, and collaboration with business leaders and organizations. The size of the program is limited to approximately 100 new students each year, and entrance into the program has become more competitive as the qualifications of each entering class continue to improve each year. The acceptance rate for the 2010–2011 academic year was approximately 35%, making the program highly selective.

=== execMBA program ===
Launched in August 2012, this 21-month program is designed for working professionals. The program constitutes 75% online and 25% in-class coursework in Columbia. It is designed to help increase self- and global-awareness, develop strategic risk taking, and heighten influence.

== PhD program ==
The Trulaske College of Business offers Ph.D. programs that are often tailored to student interests and generally require four-to-five years of study to complete.

== School of Accountancy ==
In December 1974, the Board of Curators approved the establishment of a School of Accountancy at the University of Missouri. The School of Accountancy began operations in July 1975. The School of Accountancy is one of only five colleges in the state of Missouri to offer AACSB accredited programs in accounting. The Trulaske College of Business is unique in that it does not offer a stand-alone bachelor's degree in accounting. Students complete a 150-hour program that simultaneously confers both a bachelor's and master's degree in accountancy. The college also offers a PhD in Accountancy. Both programs consistently rank in the top 15 among all accountancy programs nationwide. The School of Accountancy is also ranked 9th in the nation in research productivity, as reported in the Chronicle of Higher Education. The School of Accountancy is also well known for its high Certified Public Accountant exam pass rates. A report from the National Association of State Boards of Accountancy ranked the University of Missouri first in the nation on the May 2003 CPA exam. Students at MU achieved a 59 percent pass rate compared to the national average of 20 percent. In 2001, a Missouri grad earned the highest CPA exam score in the nation out of more than 48,000 candidates, and in 2003, a Missouri grad earned the third highest score in the nation out of more than 50,000 candidates.

== Student life & organizations ==
The College of Business is home to nearly 20 professional organizations, honor societies, and fraternities. The college's history of influential student organizations can be traced back to 1919 when Alpha Kappa Psi began to organize a chapter that would officially charter the following year. Delta Sigma Pi established itself as the second all male fraternity at the school when it established a chapter in 1923. A women's business fraternity, Phi Chi Theta, followed in 1926. The college's Upsilon chapter is currently the largest chapter in all of Alpha Kappa Psi, and likewise the college's Alpha Beta chapter is the largest chapter in all of Delta Sigma Pi. The prestigious Beta Gamma Sigma honor society established its chapter at the school in 1931. The tradition known as Commerce Day was held each spring starting in 1931, and it has since developed into the current Business Week that takes place each spring at the college.

== Notable alumni ==
- Alan C. Greenberg (BS BA '49), Vice Chairman Emeritus, J.P. Morgan Chase & Company
- E. Stanley Kroenke (BS BA '71, MBA '73), Chairman, THF Realty, owner, NBA's Denver Nuggets, NHL's Colorado Avalanche; co-owner NFL's St. Louis Rams, co-owner Premier League's Arsenal F.C.
- Kenneth Lay (BA '64, MA '65, ΒΘΠ, ΟΔΚ, ΦΒΚ), former CEO of Enron
- Rodger O. Riney (BS CiE '68, MBA '69), founder of Scottrade, deep-discount brokerage firm
- Matthew K. Rose (BS BA '81, ΛΧΑ), Chairman, CEO, and President, Burlington Northern Santa Fe
- Sam Walton (BA '40, ΒΘΠ, QEBH), founder of Wal-Mart
- Harshit Raja
