= Ellis Library =

Library at the University of Missouri, Missouri, U.S.

Elmer Ellis Library
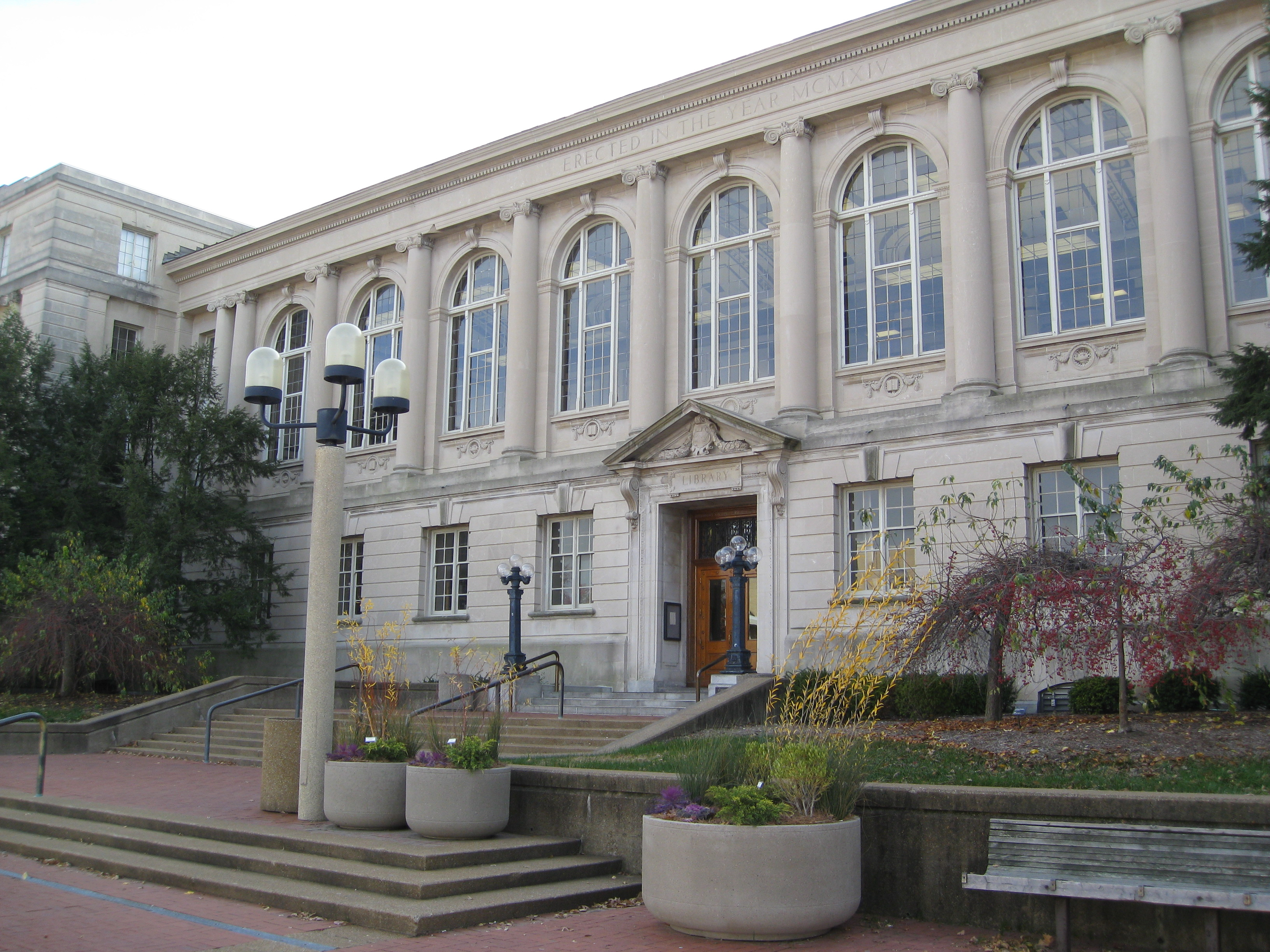
- 38.9443°N 92.3265°W
- Location: Columbia, Missouri
- Established: 1839
- Branches: 7

Collection
- Size: 3.1 million volumes (as of August 2014)

Access and use
- Members: General public, University of Missouri students, faculty, and staff

Other information
- Budget: $17,417,519 (fiscal 2013)
- Employees: 163
- Website: http://library.missouri.edu/

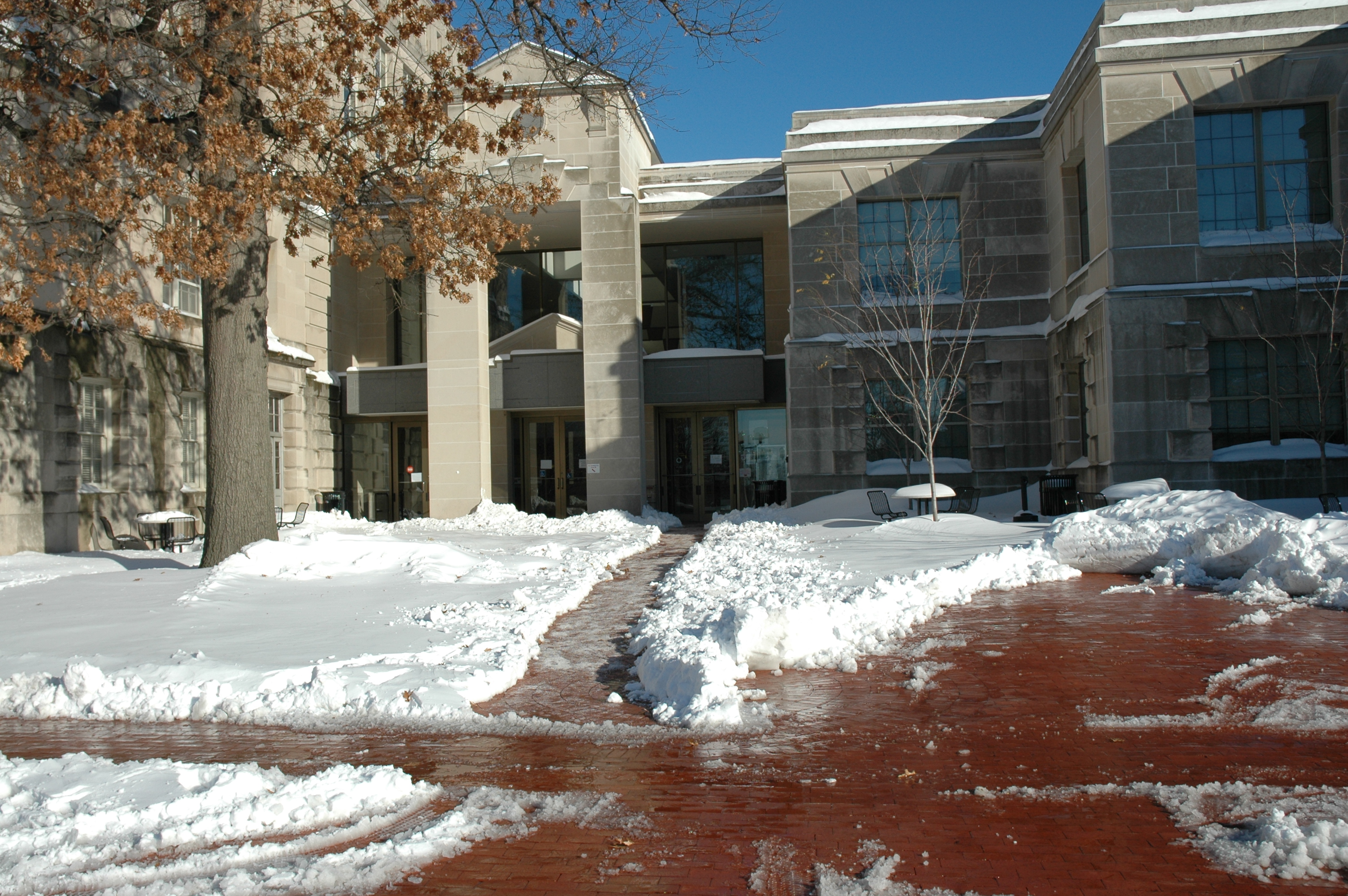
View of the library's west entrance which faces Ninth Street and Conley.

Constructed in 1915, Elmer Ellis Library is the main library of the University of Missouri on the campus of the University of Missouri in Columbia, Missouri. It was named in 1972 for former university president Elmer Ellis. With holdings of over three million volumes and six million microforms, The University of Missouri library system has been part of the Federal Depository Library Program since 1862.

The University of Missouri Museum of Art & Archaeology, as well as the Museum of Anthropology, are located in the lower level of the library on Hitt Street and Lowry Mall.

The Division of Special Collections is on 4th Floor West and houses rare books, the Comic Art Collection, and plat maps and insurance city maps of Missouri, as well as various other special collections. Some of the materials have been digitized and made available online.

Also in the main branch of Ellis is the Bookmark Café, which is on the ground floor. Aside from providing study space and social space for students and faculty, Bookmark Café also provides gallery space.
