= University of Missouri =

Public university in Columbia, Missouri, US

- Latin: Universitas Missouriensis
- Former name: Missouri State University
- Motto: Salus populi suprema lex esto (Latin)
- Motto in English: "Let the welfare of the people be the supreme law"
- Type: Public land-grant research university
- Established: February 11, 1839; 187 years ago
- Parent institution: University of Missouri System
- Accreditation: HLC
- Academic affiliations: AAU; CONAHEC; ORAU; Space-grant
- Endowment: $2.55 billion (2025) (system-wide)
- Budget: $1.76 billion (FY 2024)
- Chancellor: Mun Choi
- Provost: Matthew Martens
- Academic staff: 3,200 (fall 2024)
- Administrative staff: 6,243 (fall 2024)
- Students: 31,543 (fall 2024)
- Undergraduates: 24,449 (fall 2024)
- Postgraduates: 7,094 (fall 2024)
- Location: Columbia, Missouri, United States; 38.9453°N 92.3288°W
- Campus: 1,262 acres (511 ha) Total, 19,261 acres (7,795 ha); Midsize city
- Newspaper: The Maneater; Columbia Missourian
- Colors: Black and gold
- Nickname: Tigers
- Sporting affiliations: NCAA Division I FBS – SEC; Big 12
- Mascot: Truman the Tiger
- Website: missouri.edu

The University of Missouri (Mizzou or MU) is a public land-grant research university in Columbia, Missouri, United States. It is Missouri's largest university and the flagship of the four-campus University of Missouri System. Founded in 1839, MU was the first public university west of the Mississippi River. It has been a member of the Association of American Universities since 1908 and is classified among "R1: Doctoral Universities – Very high research activity."

Enrolling 31,041 students in 2023, it offers more than 300 degree programs in thirteen major academic divisions. Its Missouri School of Journalism, founded by Walter Williams in 1908, was established as the world's first journalism school; it publishes a daily newspaper, the Columbia Missourian, and operates NBC affiliate KOMU. The University of Missouri Research Reactor Center is the sole source of isotopes in nuclear medicine in the United States. The university operates University of Missouri Health Care, running several hospitals and clinics in Mid-Missouri.

Its NCAA Division I athletic teams are the Missouri Tigers and compete in the Southeastern Conference. The American tradition of homecoming is claimed to have originated at MU.

== History ==
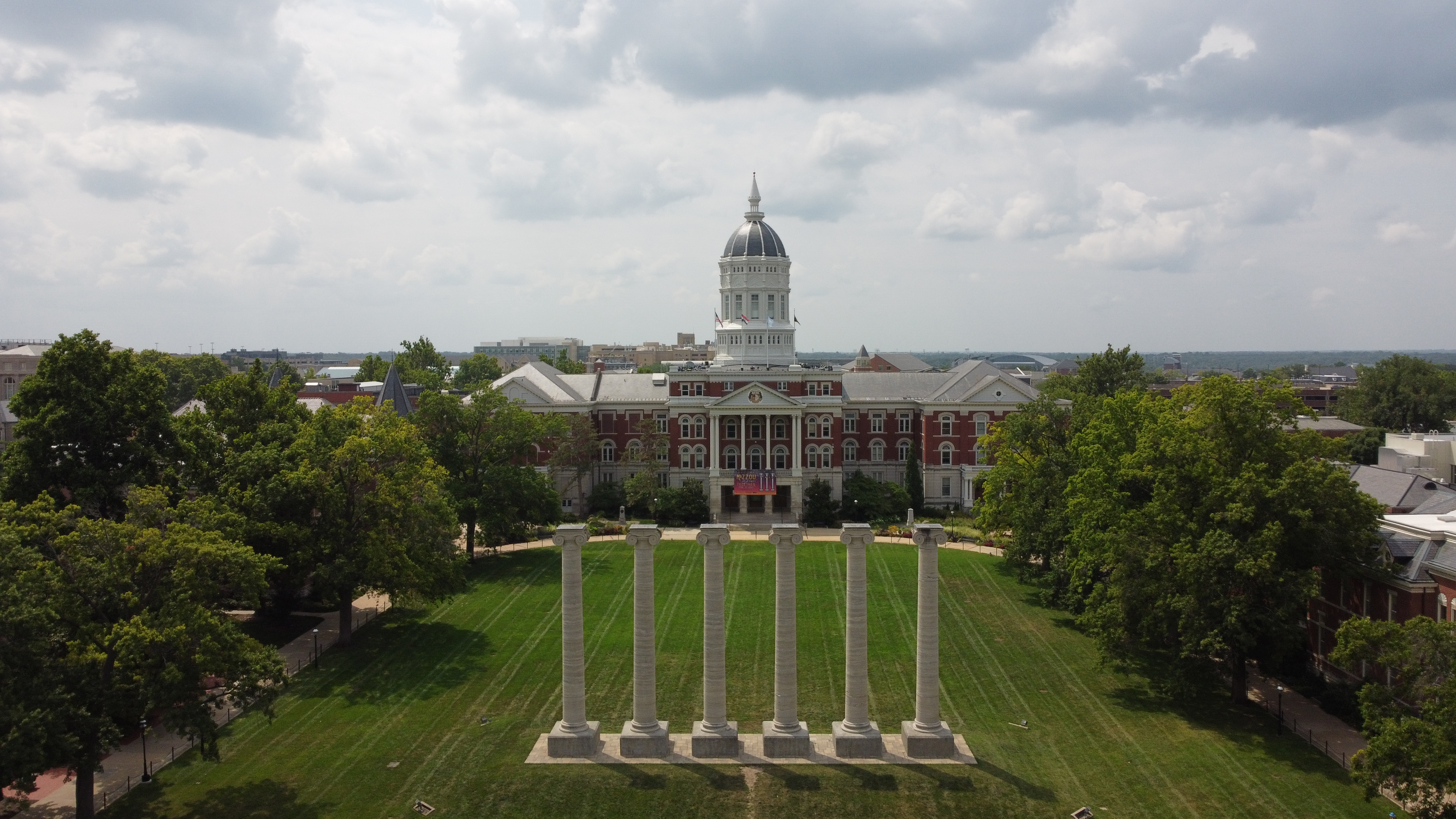
Francis Quadrangle features columns and Jesse Hall.

=== Early years ===
In 1839, the Missouri Legislature passed the Geyer Act to establish funds for a state university. It was the first public university west of the Mississippi River. To secure the university, the citizens of Columbia and Boone County pledged $117,921 in cash and land to beat out five other central Missouri counties for the location of the state university. The land on which the university was constructed was just south of Columbia's downtown and owned by James S. Rollins who was later called the "Father of the University." As the first public university in the Louisiana Purchase, the school was shaped by Thomas Jefferson's ideas about public education. The school initially admitted only white male students.

In 1862, the American Civil War forced the university to close for much of the year. Residents of Columbia formed a Union "home guard" militia that became known as the "Fighting Tigers of Columbia". They were given the name for their readiness to protect the city and university. In 1890, the university's newly formed football team took the name the "Tigers" after the Civil War militia.

In 1870, the institution was granted land-grant college status under the Morrill Act of 1862. The act led to the founding of the Missouri School of Mines and Metallurgy as an offshoot of the main campus in Columbia. It developed as the present-day Missouri University of Science and Technology. In 1888, the Missouri Agricultural Experiment Station opened. This grew to encompass ten centers and research farms around Missouri. By 1890, the university encompassed a normal college (for training of teachers of students through high school), engineering college, arts, and science college, school of agriculture and mechanical arts. school of medicine, and school of law.

=== 1892–present ===
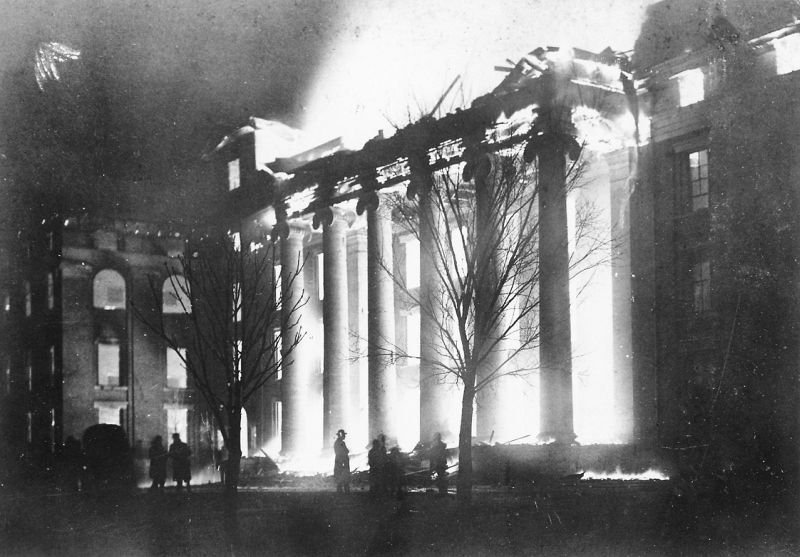
Fire at Academic Hall, 1892

On January 9, 1892, Academic Hall, the institution's central administrative building, burned in a fire that gutted the building, leaving little more standing than six stone Ionic columns. Under the administration of Missouri Governor David R. Francis, the university was rebuilt, with additions that shaped the modern institution.

After the fire, some state residents tried to have the university moved farther west to Sedalia; but Columbia rallied support to keep it. The columns were retained as a symbol of the historic campus. They are surrounded by the Francis Quadrangle, the oldest part of campus. At the quad's southern end is Academic Hall's replacement, Jesse Hall, named for Richard Jesse (the president of the university at the time of the fire). Built in 1895, Jesse Hall holds many administrative offices and Jesse Auditorium. The buildings surrounding the quad were constructed of red brick, leading to this area becoming known as Red Campus. The area was tied together in planned landscaping and walks in 1910 by George Kessler in a City Beautiful design of the grounds.

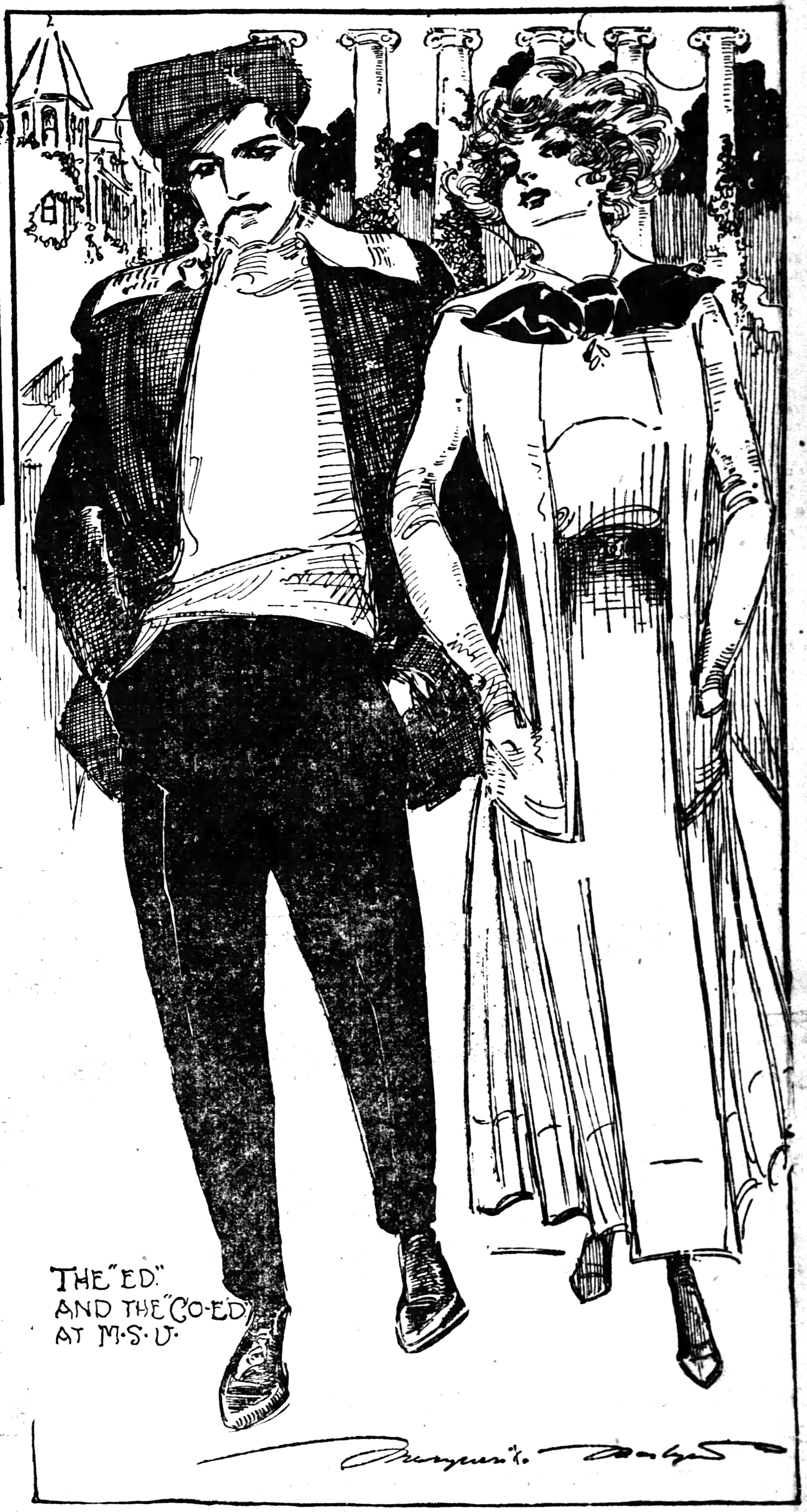
Journalist Marguerite Martyn visited the campus in 1910 and sketched these two fashionable students.

To the east of the quadrangle, later buildings constructed of white limestone in 1913 and 1914 to accommodate the new academic programs became known as the White Campus. In 1908 the journalism school opened at MU, claiming to be the world's first.

In April 1923, a black janitor was accused of the rape of the daughter of a University of Missouri professor. James T. Scott was abducted from the Boone County Jail by a lynch mob of townsfolk and students and was hanged from a bridge near the campus.

In late 1935, four graduates of Lincoln University—a traditionally black school about 30 miles (48 km) away in Jefferson City—were denied admission to MU's graduate school. One of the students, Lloyd L. Gaines, brought his case to the United States Supreme Court. On December 12, 1938, in a landmark 6–2 decision, the court ordered the State of Missouri to admit Gaines to MU's law school or provide a facility of equal stature. Gaines disappeared in Chicago on March 19, 1939, under suspicious circumstances. The university granted Gaines a posthumous honorary law degree in May 2006. Undergraduate divisions were integrated by court order in 1950 when the university was compelled to admit African Americans to courses that were not offered at Lincoln University.

On June 5, 1935, the university erected a memorial to the Confederate soldiers of Missouri; it was popularly known as Confederate Rock. The monument was removed in 1974.

Following the 2015–16 University of Missouri protests, the chancellor and system president resigned amid racial complaints by students. In addition, the university was censured by the American Association of University Professors for the third time.

Due to the emerging COVID-19 pandemic, the university canceled classes on March 11, 2020, and resumed teaching in person in August.

== Campus ==
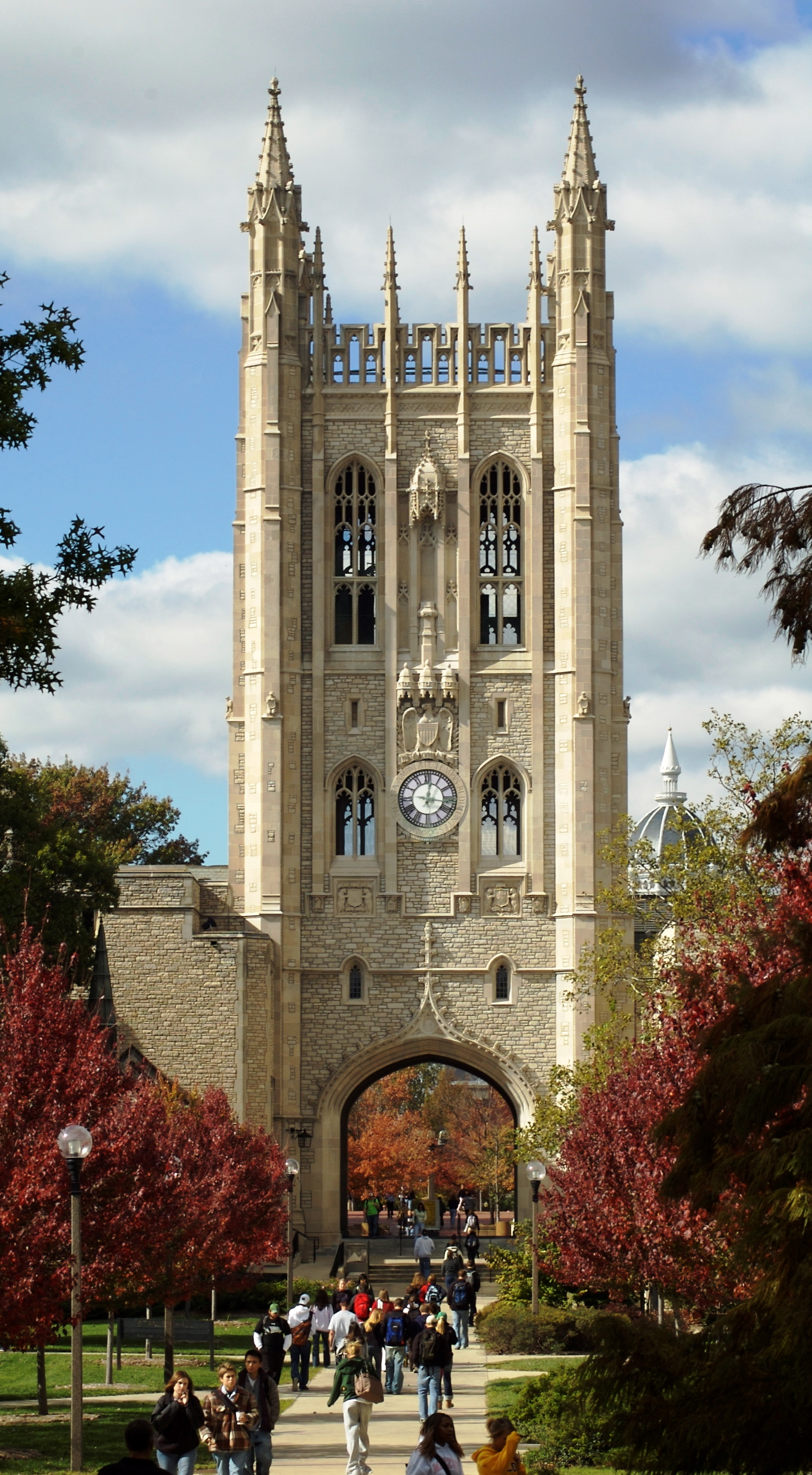
Tower of Memorial Union

The campus of the University of Missouri is 1,262-acre (2.0 sq mi; 510.7 ha) just south of Downtown Columbia and is maintained as a botanical garden. The campus received official designation as the "Mizzou Botanic Garden" in 1999, recognizing its collection of more than 11,000 trees and numerous themed plantings used for teaching and research. The historical campus is centered on Francis Quadrangle, a historic district listed on the National Register of Historic Places, and contains several buildings on the register.

The academic buildings are classified into two main groups: Red Campus and White Campus. Red Campus is the historic core of mostly brick academic buildings around the landmark columns of the Francis Quadrangle; it includes Jesse Hall and Switzler Hall. In the early 20th century, the College of Agriculture received several new buildings. The new buildings, constructed in Neo-Gothic style from native Missouri limestone, form the White Campus. This includes Memorial Union.

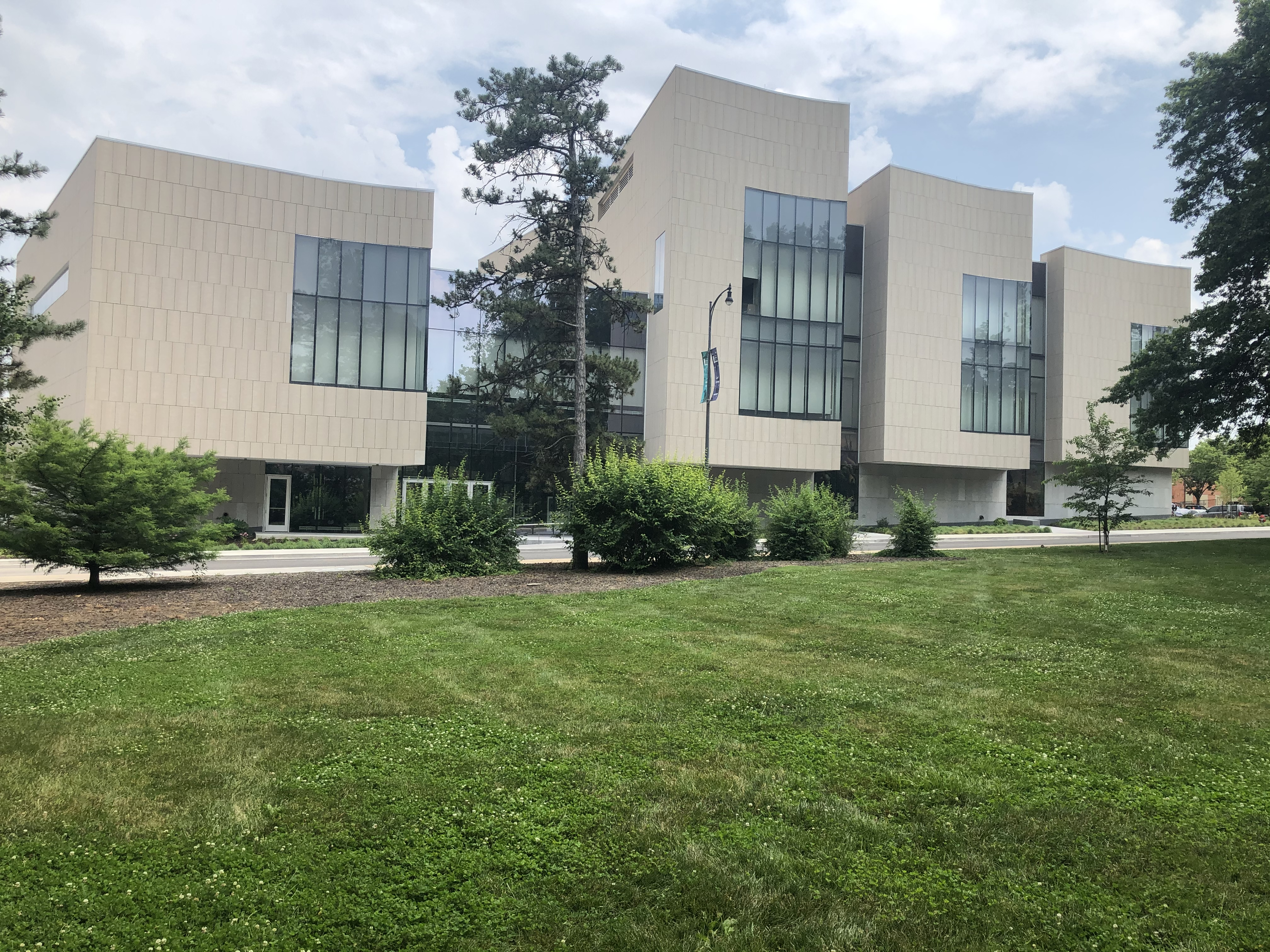
The Center for Missouri Studies is a headquarters, museum, and research facility for the State Historical Society of Missouri.

During the 1990s, Red Campus was extended to the south with the creation of the Carnahan Quadrangle. Hulston Hall of the University of Missouri School of Law, completed in 1988, formed the eastern border of the future quad. The Reynolds Alumni Center was completed in 1992 on the west side of the new quad. It was completed in 2002 with Cornell Hall of the Trulaske College of Business and Tiger Plaza. Plans for a new plaza on the north end of the Carnahan Quadrangle were unveiled in 2014. Called Traditions Plaza, it was opened on October 25, 2014, during homecoming festivities.

The original MU intercollegiate athletic facilities, such as Rollins Field and Rothwell Gymnasium, were just south of the academic buildings. Expanded facilities were constructed across Stadium Boulevard, where Memorial Stadium opened in 1926. The Hearnes Center was built to the east of the stadium in 1972. In 1994, the university developed the first draft of a master plan for the campus to tie together all of Tiger athletic facilities to the south of Stadium Boulevard and add to its design. The MU Sports Park includes the Mizzou Arena, Taylor Stadium, Walton Stadium, Mizzou Athletics Training Complex, University Field and Devine Pavilion. Student athletic facilities remain in the core area of campus. Rothwell Gymnasium and Brewer Fieldhouse are part of the 283,579-square-foot (26,345.4 m^{2}) Student Recreation Center, which was ranked number one in the nation in 2005 by Sports Illustrated.

The main campus of the University of Missouri Hospitals and Clinics is north of the sports complex. It includes the University of Missouri Hospital and Truman Memorial Veterans Hospital. Two of the hospitals, Columbia Regional Hospital and Ellis Fischel Cancer Center, are northeast of the main campus near I-70.

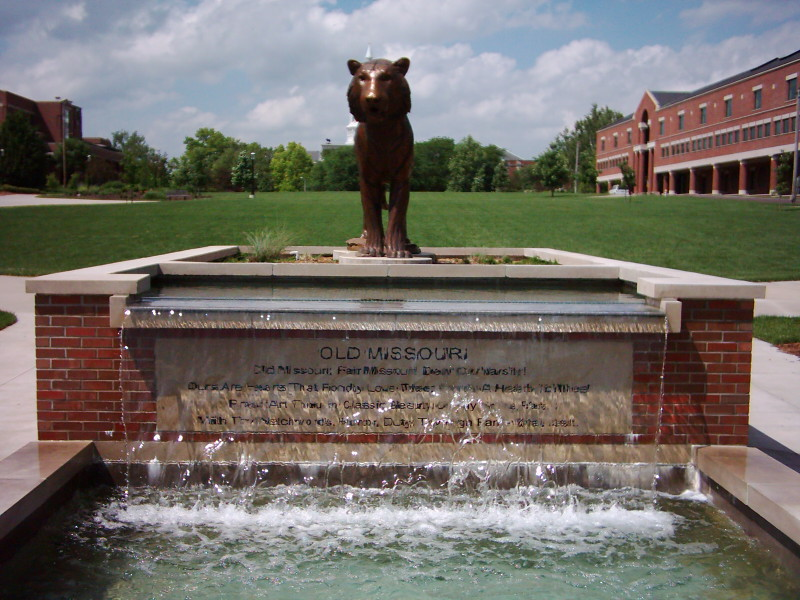
Tiger Plaza on the Carnahan Quadrangle

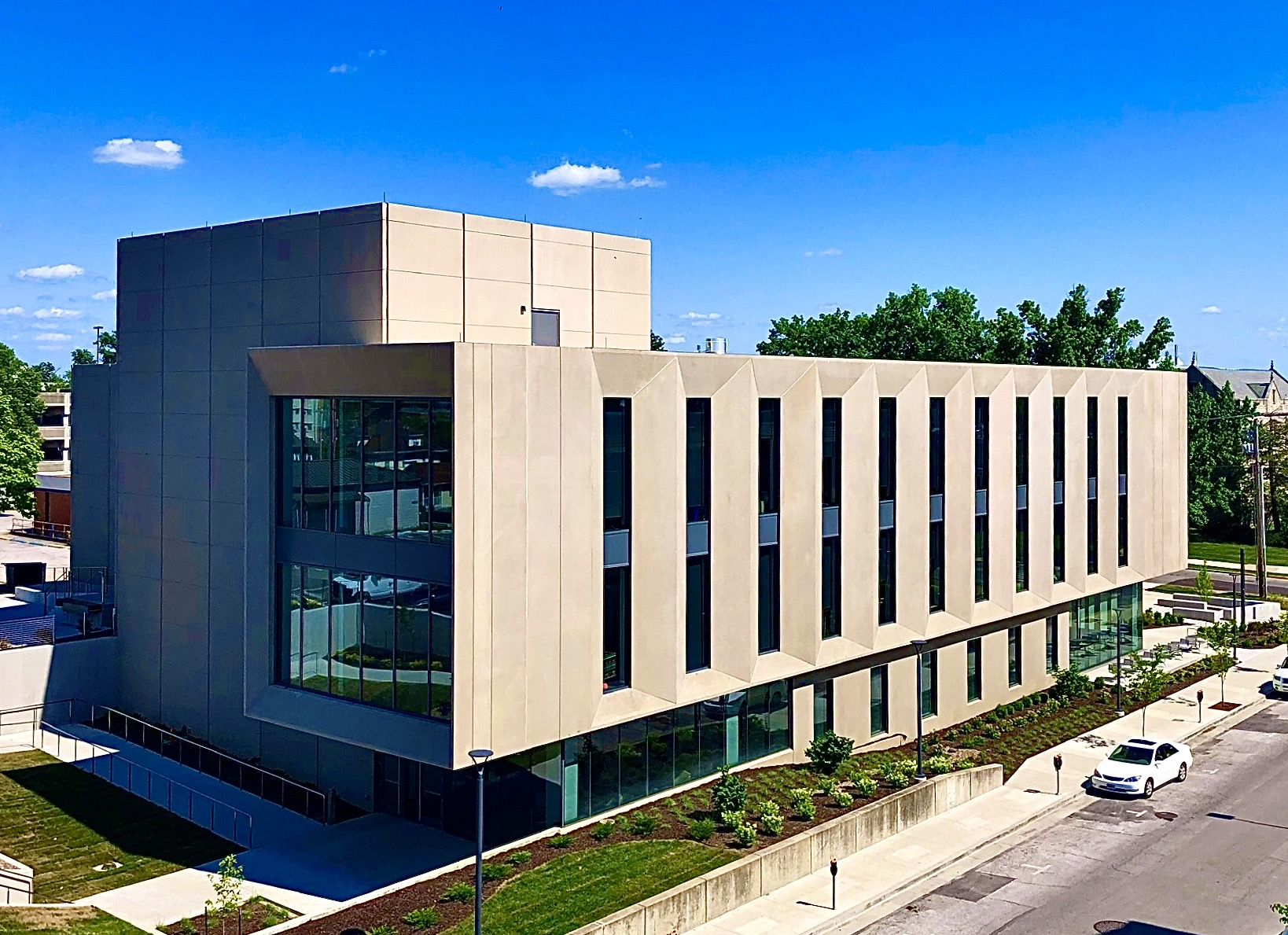
The Sinquefield Music Center

=== In media ===
The campus is the major setting for the 1965 novel Stoner by John Edward Williams. Protagonist William Stoner is an English professor who was raised on a farm in nearby Boonville.

== Organization and administration ==
College or school founding
College or school	Year founded
College of Arts and Science	1841
College of Education & Human Development	1868
College of Agriculture, Food and Natural Resources	1870
School of Law	1872
School of Medicine	1872
College of Engineering	1877
Graduate School	1896
School of Journalism	1908
Trulaske College of Business	1914
School of Music	1917
Sinclair School of Nursing	1920
College of Veterinary Medicine	1946
School of Social Work	1948
Honors College	1958
College of Human Environmental Sciences	1960
School of Accountancy	1975
School of Natural Resources	1989
School of Information Science & Learning Technologies	1997
College of Health Sciences	2000
Truman School of Public Affairs	2001
School of Visual Studies	2018

The University of Missouri is organized into seven colleges and eleven schools, and hosts approximately 300 majors.

=== Name ===
Upon creation of the system, each university was renamed with its host city; thus, the university in Columbia became the University of Missouri–Columbia. There were attempts to drop Columbia from its name by students, faculty, alumni, and administrators who said it might cause the university to be perceived as a regional institution. This change was long resisted by the UM System and the other universities based on uniformity and fairness. The board of curators voted unanimously in 2007 to allow MU to drop Columbia from its name for all public use.

=== Presidents and chancellors ===
Each campus of the University of Missouri System is led by a chancellor, who reports to the president of the UM System.

Since 2020, the current chancellor of the Columbia campus is Mun Choi who has been simultaneously serving as President of the University of Missouri System.

== Academics ==
Academic rankings

National
- Forbes: 116
- U.S. News & World Report: 95 (tie)
- Washington Monthly: 52
- WSJ/College Pulse: 180

Global
- QS: =697
- THE: 401–500
- U.S. News & World Report: 466 (tie)

MU is a member of the Association of American Universities and classified among "R1: Doctoral Universities – Very high research activity". The oldest global university ranking project, the Academic Ranking of World Universities (Shanghai Ranking), places MU at 60-78 nationally and 201-300 globally as of 2024. The ranking largely takes into account research output and faculty prestige. In 2024 the university's research and development expenditures were $462 million as submitted to the National Science Foundation. MU is also one of two land-grant universities in the state, along with Lincoln University.

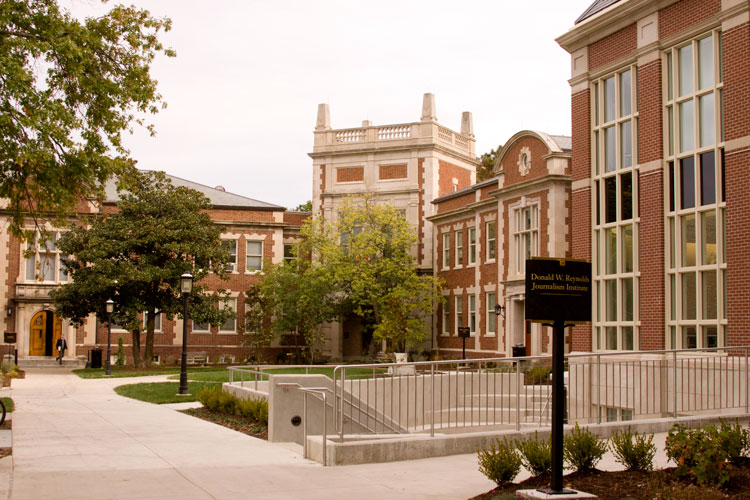
The Missouri School of Journalism

In 1908, the Missouri School of Journalism was founded in Columbia. It has been ranked the top journalism school in the United States several times by the NewsPro–RTDNA survey. Although it claims to be the world's first, the Ecole Supérieure de Journalisme de Paris was established in 1899.

The UM System owns and operates KOMU-TV, the NBC/CW affiliate for Columbia and nearby Jefferson City. It is a full-fledged commercial station and a working lab for journalism students. The MU School of Journalism publishes the Columbia Missourian and Vox Magazine where students learn reporting, editing, and design in a newsroom managed by professional editors. It operates the local National Public Radio Station KBIA and produces Radio Adelante, a Spanish-language radio program.

Founded in 1978 after 23 years as a unit of the School of Medicine, the School of Health Professions became an autonomous division in December 2000. It is Missouri's only state-supported school of health professions on a campus with an academic health center, and the only allied health school in the UM system.

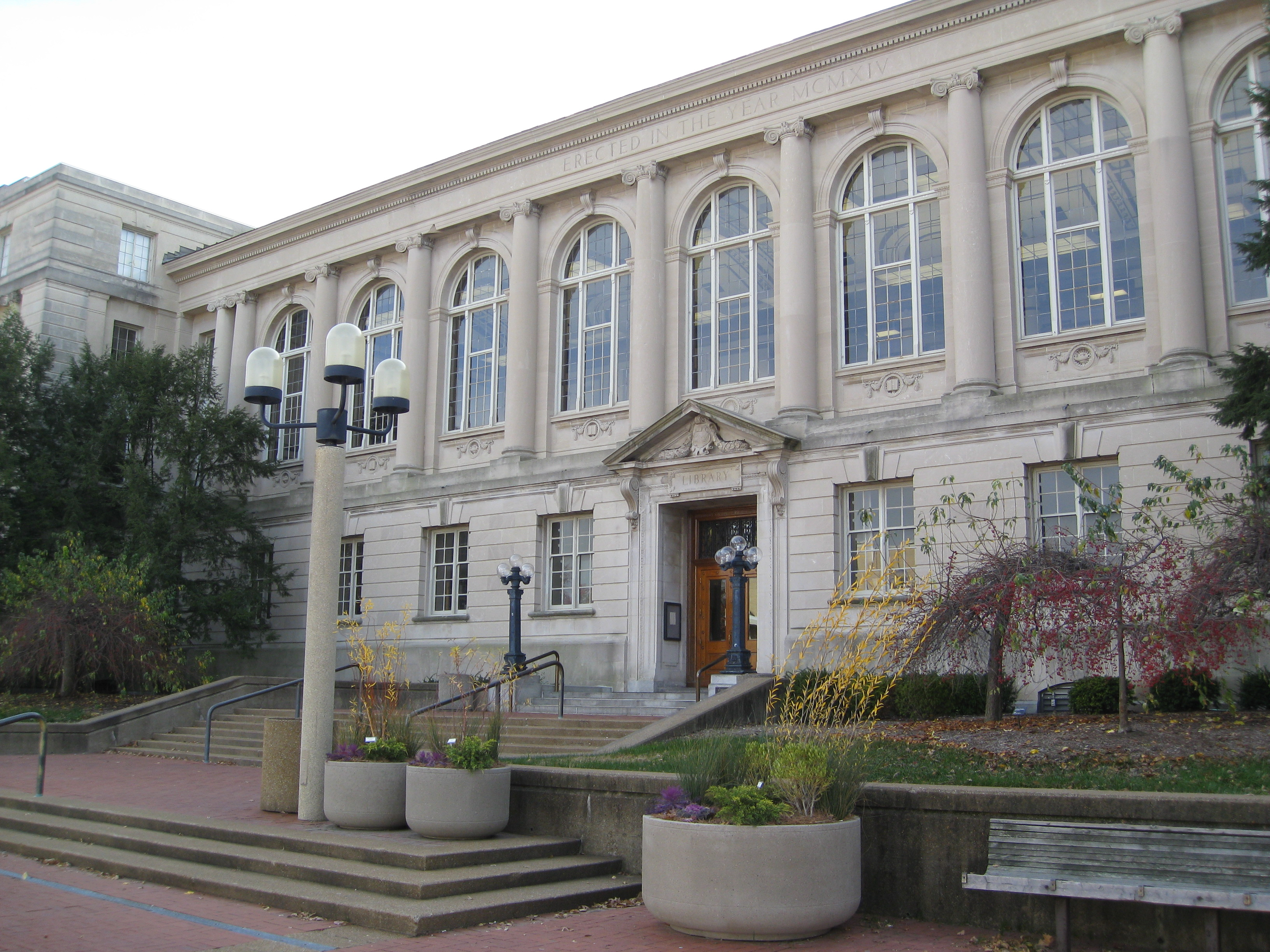
Ellis Library is the main library of the university.

The university maintains the largest library collection in the State of Missouri. In the 2011–12 academic year, it held 3.1 million volumes, 8.1 million microforms, 678,596 e-books, almost 1.7 million government documents, more than 284,000 print maps, and more than 53,000 journal subscriptions. The collection is housed in Ellis Library, the University Archives, and seven other specialized academic libraries across campus.

During the American Civil War, Union troops used the library in Academic Hall as a guard room. They caused significant damage, including taking 467 volumes to build fires. The board of curators later sued the US Army for the destruction on campus. Settled in 1915, the suit's award was used to build the Memorial Gateway on the northern edge of Red Campus.

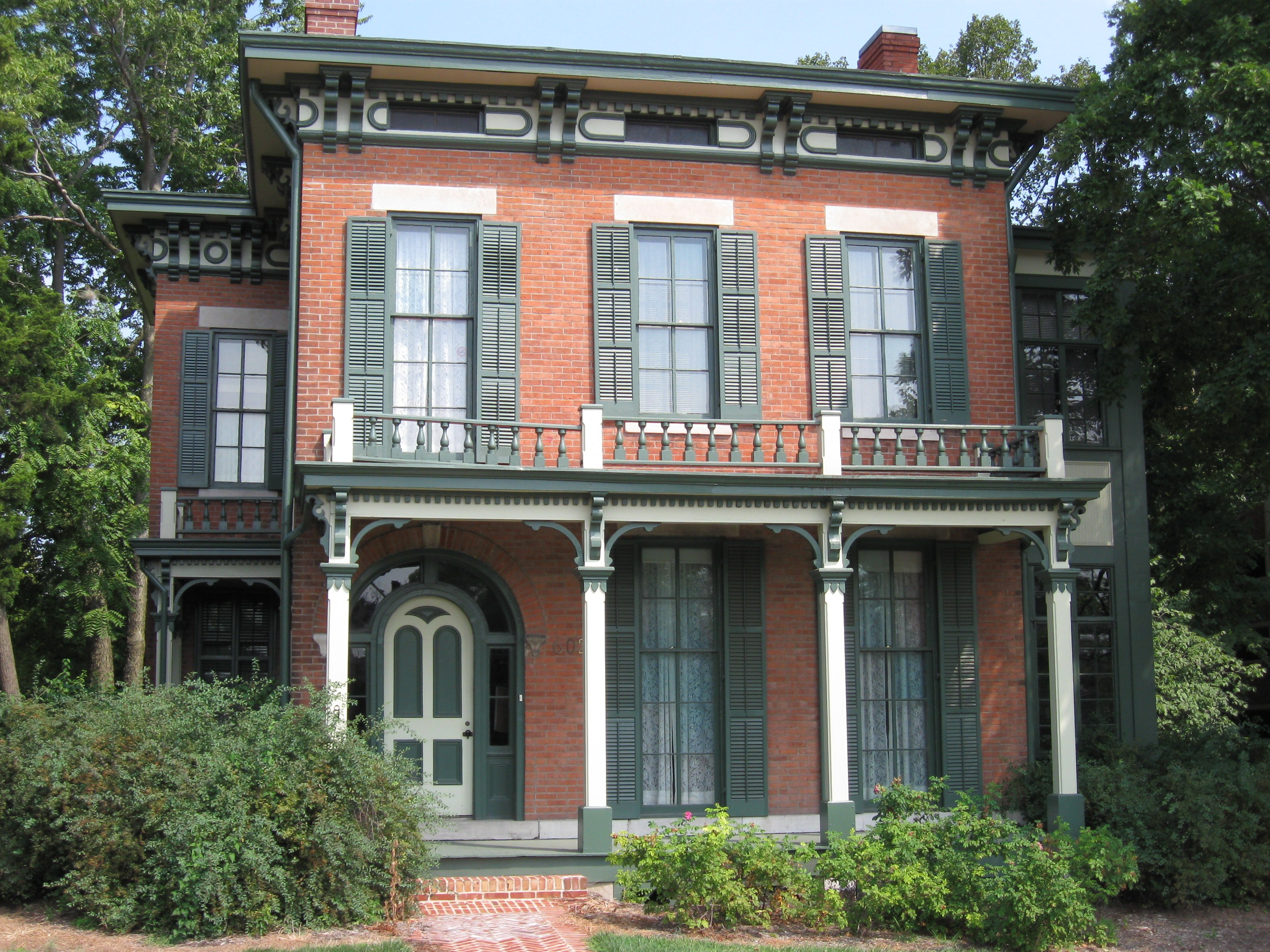
Sanford F. Conley House

In 1913, construction began on a new main library, completed in 1915. It was expanded in 1935, 1958, and 1985. It was dedicated as Elmer Ellis Library on October 10, 1972, in honor of the thirteenth president of the University of Missouri. The MU libraries are home to the 47th largest research collection in North America.

MU merged two departments, the Center for Distance and Independent Study and MU Direct: Continuing and Distance Education, to form Mizzou Online in 2011. Mizzou Online offers online courses for 18 of the university's colleges and operates the University of Missouri High School, a distance learning K-12 high school. In the U.S. News & World Report’s 2024 Best Online Programs, MU ranks 28th in the best online bachelor’s degree programs out of 339 universities nationwide.

=== Admissions ===
MU is the largest public university in Missouri. Of those applying for freshman admission, 78.1% are admitted with those matriculating having an average GPA of 3.6, an average SAT composite score of 1232 out of a maximum of 1600, and an average ACT composite score of 26 out of a maximum of 36.

==== Undergraduate admissions ====
===== First time applicants =====
	2015	2016	2017	2018	2019	2020	2021	2022	2023
Applicants	21988	21107	16373	18948	20015	20641	19966	20303	21669
Admitted	17180	15767	12787	14750	16158	16880	15283	16065	16690
Enrolled	6191	4780	4140	4673	5431	5315	4843	4983	5193
Admit rate	78.1%	74%	78.1%	77.8%	80.7%	81.8%	76.5%	79.1%	77%

To be admitted as freshman applicants need to take the following classes in high school: 4 English units, 4 Math units, 3 Science units, 3 Social science units, 2 foreign language units, and 1 fine art unit.

Home schooled and students who attended non-accredited schools need a 24 on the ACT or an 1160 on the SAT.

===== Transfer applicants =====
	2015	2016	2017	2018	2019	2020
Applicants	3319	2824	2604	2644	2475	2903
Admitted	2215	1756	1647	1729	1674	2000
Enrolled	1191	994	996	973	1113	1270
Admit rate	66.7%	62%	63%	65%	67%	69%

Transfer applicants need a college GPA of 2.5 and a minimum of 24 credits. Transfer applicants from Missouri or border state colleges need a college GPA of 2.0 and an associates degree or have finished the 42 general education requirements.

Some transfer applicants need to submit a high school transcript, interview, or standardized test.

== Student life ==
Undergraduate demographics as of Fall 2023
Race and ethnicity	Total
White	80%
Hispanic	6%
Black	5%
Two or more races	4%
Asian	3%
International student	1%
Unknown	1%
Economic diversity
Low-income (Note: The percentage of students who received an income-based federal Pell grant intended for low-income students.)	21%
Affluent (Note: The percentage of students who are a part of the American middle class at the bare minimum.)	79%

Age
Average age	20
undergrads 25 or older	3%
State of residence (excluding foreign national students)
In state	80%
Out of state	20%

=== Residential life ===
The University of Missouri operates 23 on-campus residence halls and at least two other off-campus sites. The two off-campus locations include Tiger Diggs at Campus View Apartments and True Scholars House.

=== Greek life ===
Founded in 1869, the Greek Community represents a significant part of campus culture, with the Office of Student affairs reporting 7,500 students as members of fraternities and sororities.

Fraternity hazing received national news coverage in the years 2021, when Danny Santulli was injured and sustained cardiac arrest and severe brain damage after alcohol abuse. Houses of Horror: Secrets of College Greek Life, describes how the boy was forced to drink 1.75 liters of vodka at once. He had been previously hospitalized after an earlier hazing incident.

=== Homecoming ===
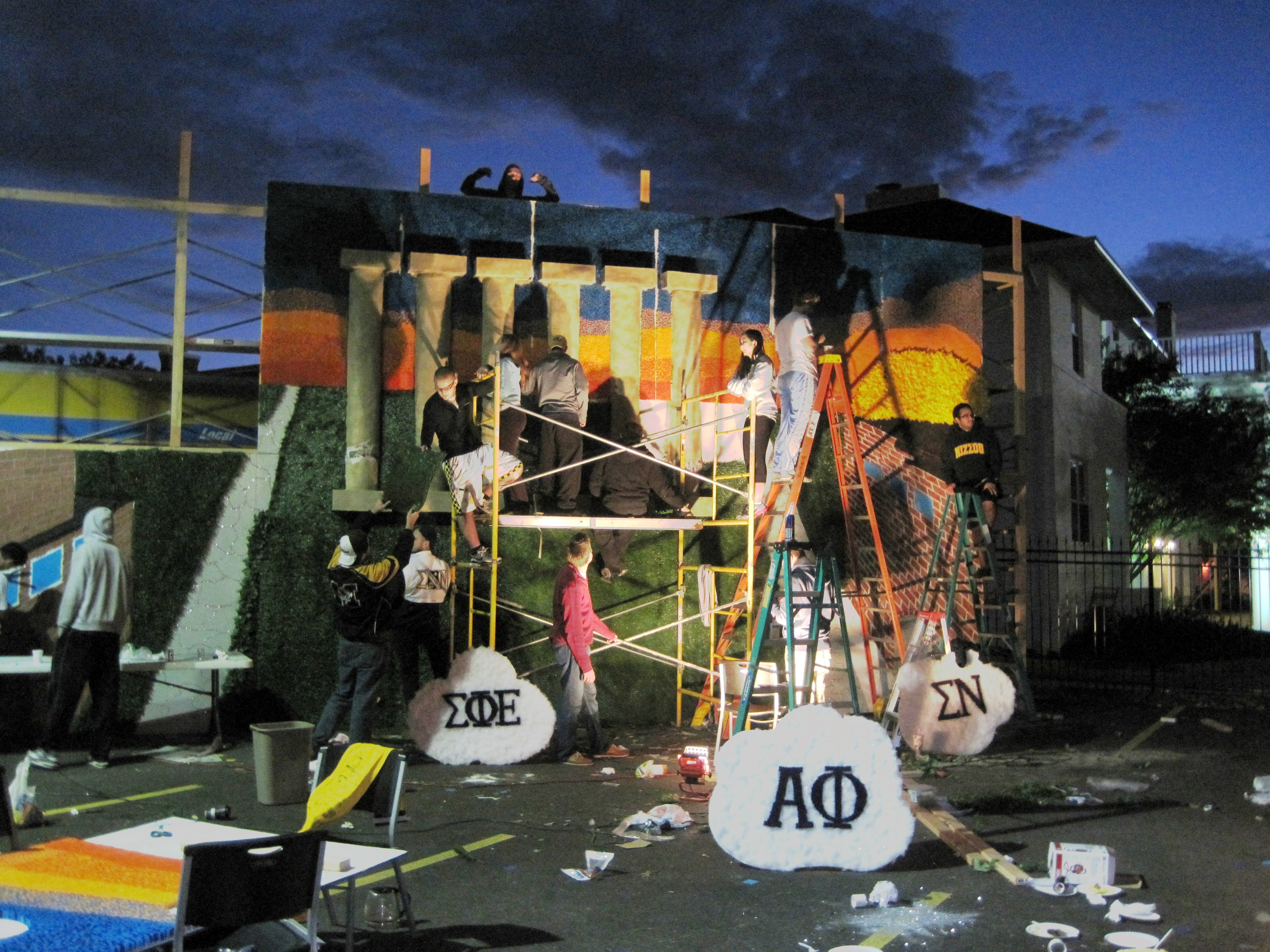
Students work on house decorations, a yearly Homecoming tradition for fraternities and sororities.

In 1911, athletic director Chester Brewer invited alumni to "come home" for the big football game against the University of Kansas. A spirit rally and parade were planned as part of the celebration. Missouri Homecoming also includes several service elements, and the homecoming blood drive has earned the Guinness Record as the nation's largest.

== Athletics ==
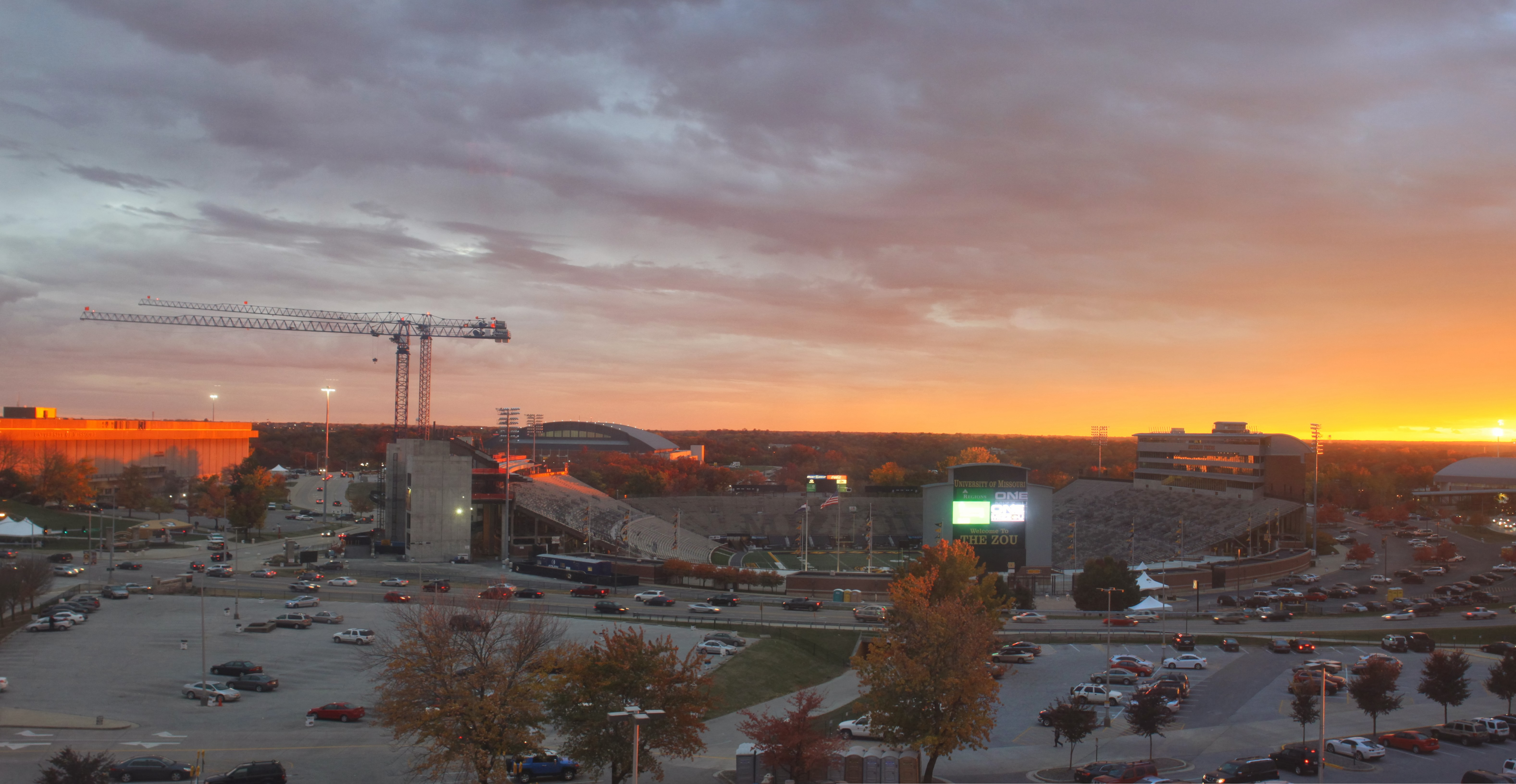
Hearnes Center, Mizzou Arena, and Faurot Field

The Missouri Tigers are a member of the Southeastern Conference except wrestling, which competes in the Big 12 Conference. Mizzou is the only school in the state with all of its sports in the NCAA Division I and a football team that competes in the NCAA Division I Football Bowl Subdivision (FBS). These are the highest levels of college sports in the United States. Their official colors are black and gold.

Athletic sports for the Tigers include men's and women's basketball, baseball, cross country, football, golf, gymnastics, swimming and diving, softball, track, tennis, volleyball, women's soccer, and wrestling. Historic sports included a shooting club, in which the ladies' team in 1934 won a national championship.

MU football games are on Faurot Field at Memorial Stadium ("The Zou"). Built in 1926, this stadium has an official capacity of 71,168, and features a nearly 100 ft (30 m) wide "M" behind the north-end zone. Men's and women's basketball games take place at the Mizzou Arena, just south of the football stadium. The Hearnes Center hosted men's and women's basketball from 1972 to 2004 and it is still used for other athletic (including wrestling, volleyball, and indoor track and field) and school events.

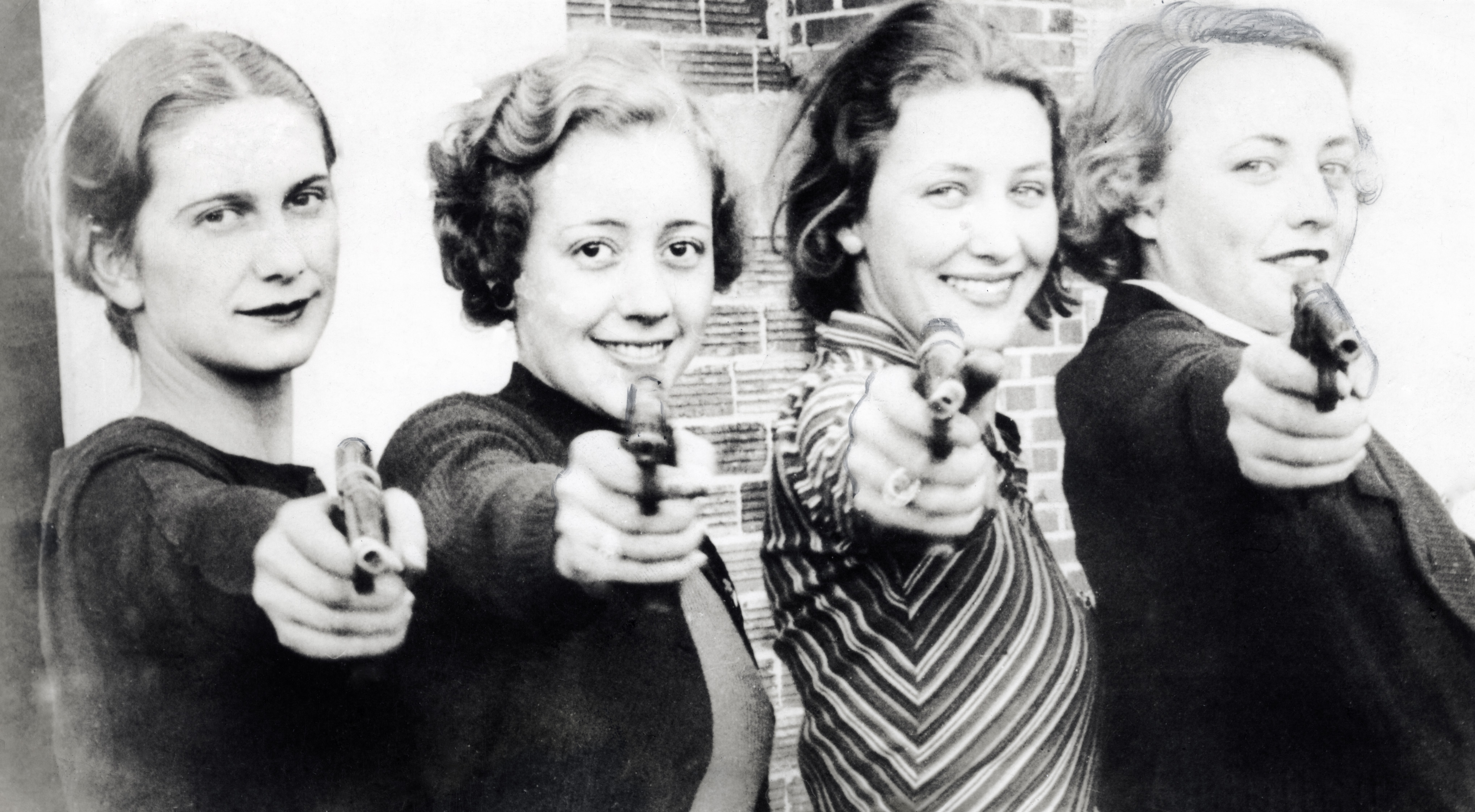
Ladies champion team of the Missouri University shooting club, 1934

The Missouri Tiger men's basketball team has had 29 NCAA Tournament appearances, the second-most Tournament appearances without a Final Four. The Tigers have appeared in the regional finals (Elite Eight) of the NCAA Tournament six times (twice under coach Norm Stewart, Missouri head coach from 1967 to 1999). The Tigers have won 15 conference championships, beginning with the Missouri Valley Conference, followed by the Big Six, the Big Eight, and the Big 12 Conference. In 1994, the Tigers went undefeated in the Big Eight to take the regular season title. In 2009, Missouri won its first Big 12 Championship over Baylor. Missouri went on to win its second Big 12 Championship in its final season in the Big 12 in 2012, once again defeating Baylor. Standout players from the Mizzou's basketball team include Anthony Peeler, John Brown, Jon Sundvold, Steve Stipanovich, Kareem Rush, Keyon Dooling Doug Smith, Willie Smith, Norm Stewart, Linas Kleiza, Derrick Chievous, DeMarre Carroll, Kim English, Jordan Clarkson, and Marcus Denmon.

The official mascot for Missouri Tigers athletics is Truman the Tiger, created on September 16, 1986. Following a campus-wide contest, Truman was named in honor of Harry S. Truman, the only U.S. president from Missouri. Truman appears to cheer on the team, mingle with athletic supporters, visit alumni association functions, and visit Columbia-area schools.

Faurot Field during a football game

On November 6, 2011, the University of Missouri announced it would leave the Big 12 Conference to join the Southeastern Conference effective July 1, 2012. In September 2012, the school's wrestling team became an associate member of the Mid-American Conference, as the SEC does not sponsor wrestling.

== Student outcomes ==
According to College Scorecard, the median income in 2020 and 2021 for graduates who matriculated in 2010 and 2011 was $63,403, with 82% of graduates making more than high school graduates.

The Center on Education and the Workforce estimated that the return on investment with a bachelors at Mizzou is $101,000 10 years after graduation, this accelerates to $1,006,000 40 years after graduation.

=== Graduation rates ===
According to College Scorecard, the graduation rate at Mizzou is 72%.

== Notable people ==
In 2016, there were 300,315 living alumni worldwide. Of those, 274,447 resided in the United States, 156,585 in Missouri, 61,346 in the St. Louis metropolitan area, 30,018 in the Kansas City metropolitan area, and 2,718 outside the U.S. Other alumni, faculty, and staff include 18 Rhodes Scholars, 19 Truman Scholars, 150 Fulbright Scholars, 7 Governors of Missouri, and 6 members of the U.S. Congress. Two alumni and faculty have been awarded the Nobel Prize: alumnus Frederick Chapman Robbins won the Nobel Prize in Physiology or Medicine in 1954 and George Smith was awarded the Nobel Prize in Chemistry in 2018 while affiliated with the university.

== See also ==
- KBIA
- KCOU
- KOMU-TV
- Missouri Scholars Academy
