= Education in Missouri =

Education in Missouri is provided by both public and private schools, colleges, and universities, and a variety of public library systems. All public education in the state is governed by the Missouri State Board of Education, which is made up of eight citizens appointed by the Governor of Missouri and confirmed by the Missouri Senate.

== Elementary and secondary education ==
Administration of primary and secondary public schools in the state is conducted by the Missouri Department of Elementary and Secondary Education (DESE). Education is compulsory from ages seven to seventeen in Missouri, commonly but not exclusively divided into three tiers: elementary school, middle school or junior high school, and high school. The public schools system includes kindergarten to 12th grade. District territories are often complex in structure. In some cases, elementary, middle and junior high schools of a single district feed into high schools in another district. High school athletics and competitions are governed by the Missouri State High School Activities Association (MSHAA). Missouri education also includes a virtual school program called Missouri Course Access and Virtual School Program (MOCAP).

The Missouri Assessment Program (MAP) is an annual set of mandatory standardized tests taken by students in grades 3 through 8. Students also complete exams at the end of completing certain courses, with certain exams required for graduation, including Algebra I (required), Algebra II, American History, Biology (required), English I, English II (required), Geometry, Government (required), and Personal Finance. There also is an alternate MAP test designed for students with cognitive disabilities who meet grade level and eligibility criteria, and an assessment of English proficiency for students classified as English Learners.

=== Homeschooling ===
Homeschooling in Missouri is not regulated by the Department of Elementary and Secondary Education. The state does not provide any monetary assistance or curriculum or materials to home schoolers. Parents who decide to home-school must provide 1,000 hours of instruction during the school year pursuant to Section 167.031 of the Missouri revised statutes. Parents must also keep a daily log and sample of academic work. Homeschool students frequently attend their local colleges and universities. According to Missouri State University's Enrollment department, homeschool students had higher than average ACT scores and better end-of-semester GPA than their peers.

=== Charter schools ===
Charter schools are permitted in the Saint Louis Public Schools (SLPS) district, the Kansas City Public Schools (KCPS) district, any unaccredited school district, and if certain conditions are met, provisionally accredited school districts. As of the 2025-26 school year, there are 37 charter schools operating in the state. All but one is located in the SLPS district or the KCPS district. (Note: The one is The Leadership School in the Normandy Schools Collaborative (formerly the Normandy School District).) They are considered public schools, and they do not charge tuition.

=== MOScholars ===
MOScholars is a Missouri program that lets eligible families use state education funds for approved expenses like private school tuition, tutoring, curriculum, and educational therapies.

== Colleges and universities ==
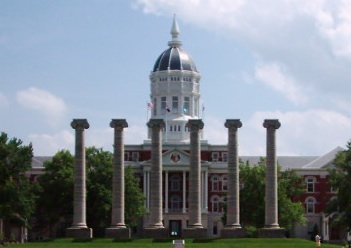
Jesse Hall and the Francis Quad on the University of Missouri campus.

Public colleges and universities in Missouri are administered by the Missouri Department of Higher Education. The state system of higher education includes 13 four-year universities and 20 two-year colleges, which includes the University of Missouri System, the state's public university system. The flagship institution and largest university in the state is the University of Missouri in Columbia. The others in the system are University of Missouri–St. Louis, University of Missouri–Kansas City and Missouri University of Science and Technology. The state also maintains another set of public universities that are not part of the University of Missouri system, which include Southeast Missouri State University in Cape Girardeau, Missouri State University in Springfield, Truman State University in Kirksville, Northwest Missouri State University in Maryville and the University of Central Missouri in Warrensburg. The state also funds a $2000, renewable merit-based scholarship known as Bright Flight, which is given to Missouri students attending an in-state university who earned a composite score on the ACT or SAT in the top 3 percent in Missouri, or a score among the top 5% of test takers nationally.

Private universities in Missouri include Saint Louis University, Washington University in St. Louis, Maryville University and Rockhurst University in Kansas City. There are numerous junior colleges, trade schools, theological seminaries, and church universities.

== See also ==
- List of high schools in Missouri
- List of school districts in Missouri
- Missouri A+ schools program
- Missouri State Board of Education
