= William Franklin Switzler =

American journalist

Colonel William Franklin Switzler
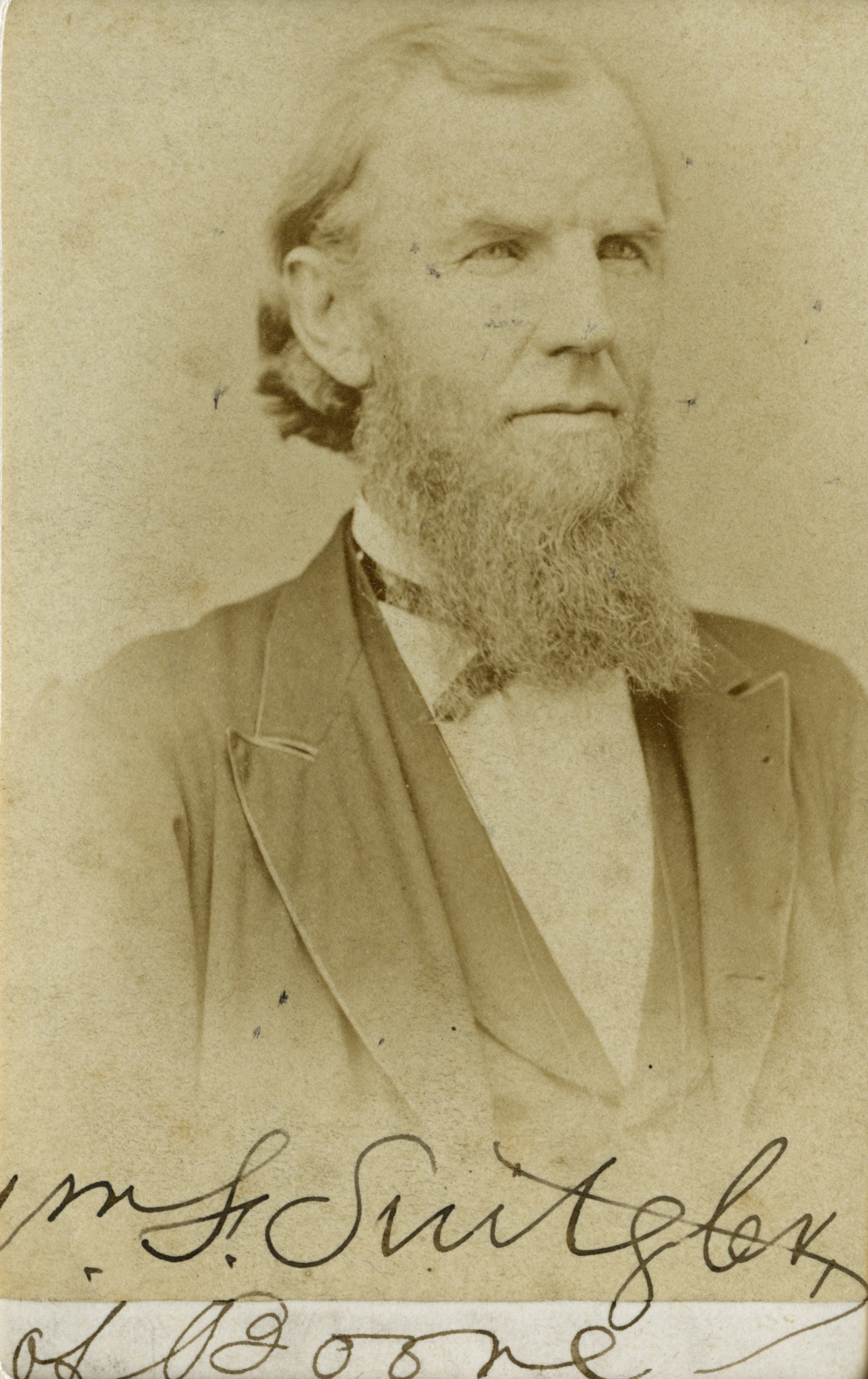
- Born: March 16, 1819; Columbia, Missouri
- Died: May 24, 1906 (aged 87)
- Resting place: Columbia Cemetery
- Occupations: journalist, publisher, politician / legislator, historian
- Notable work: Switzler's Illustrated History of Missouri, History of Boone County, Missouri

William Franklin Switzler (March 16, 1819 – May 24, 1906) was an American notable lawyer, journalist, publisher, and historian from Columbia, Missouri.

== Biography ==
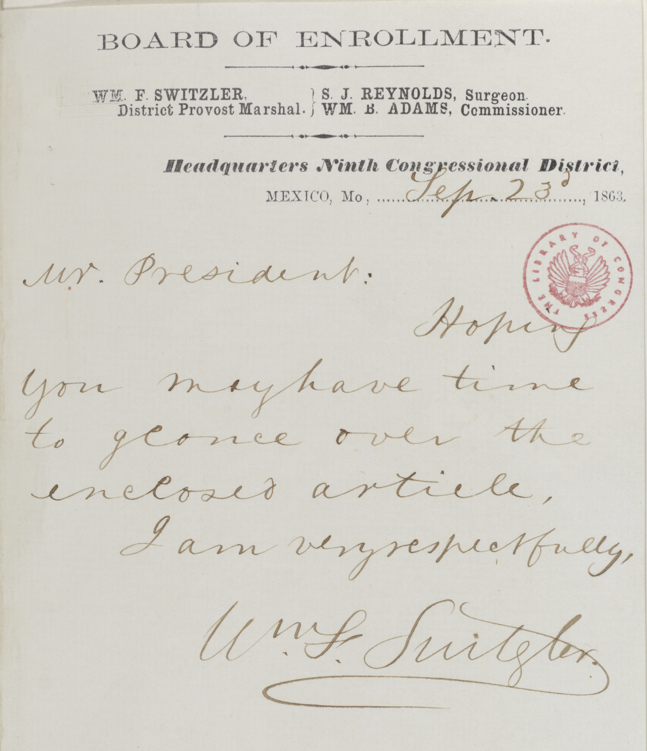
William F. Switzler handwritten letter to 16th President Abraham Lincoln at the White House in Washington, D.C., dated Wednesday, September 23, 1863

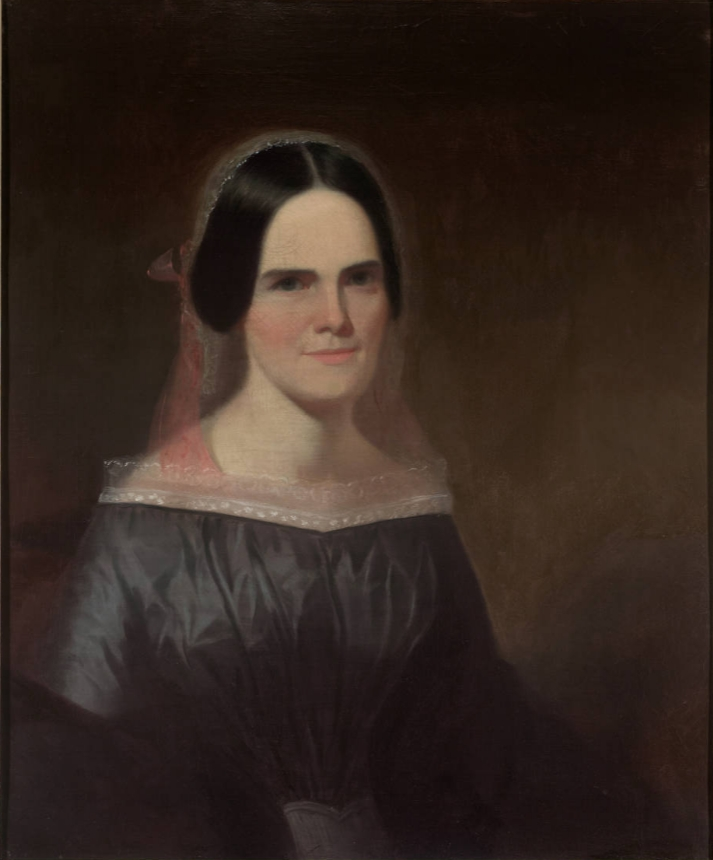
Mrs. William F. Switzler, (nee - Mary Jane Royall, 1820-1879), wife of William Franklin Switzler (1819-1906)

William F. Switzler was born in Fayette County, Kentucky. In 1826, his family moved west to Fayette, Missouri.

He studied law under local Boone County, Missouri attorneys Abiel Leonard (1848-1903), (who was also a state supreme court judge), and James Sidney Rollins (1812-1888), and practiced it for several years. In 1841, he started editing the newspaper Columbia Patriot in Columbia, Missouri, eventually liking it and going into the business and practice of journalism. He also printed another paper of the Columbia Statesman (a.k.a. Missouri Statesman); later in his life he also edited the Chillicothe Constitution / Constitution-Tribune (in Chillicothe, Ohio) and the Missouri Democrat (of Boonville, Missouri in Boone County).

During the American Civil War (1861-1865), in 1863, he was appointed a provost marshal for the 9th District of Missouri, supporting the Union cause of the North.

Following the war, he served as a state Representative in the Missouri House of Representatives, the lower chamber of the General Assembly of Missouri (state legislature), for Boone County, Missouri, at the old Missouri State Capitol in the state capital of Jefferson City.

Twice, (in 1866 and two decades later in 1888), Switzler ran for a seat in the United States House of Representatives, the lower chamber of the Congress of the United States, unsuccessfully.

In 1885, during the administration of Democrat and 22nd President Grover Cleveland, (1837-1908, served 1885-1889 & 1893-1897), he was appointed Chief of the Bureau of Statistics (then in the United States Department of the Treasury, currently now the reorganized Bureau of Economic Analysis in the U.S. Treasury Department), and worked / resided in the national federal capital city of Washington, D.C. during that time.

In 1879, he researched, wrote and edited / published Switzler's illustrated history of Missouri, from 1541 to 1877 about the long then three centuries / 336 years of Missouri's colonial, territorial and state history. Three years later in 1882, followed — a History of Boone County, Missouri (about the heritage of Boone County, Missouri).

He died May 24, 1906 in Columbia, Missouri, aged 87 years old. Switzler was buried in the Columbia Cemetery at Columbia, (the county seat of Boone County), Missouri.

His papers and historical / biographical documents for the period of 1836-1905, are preserved by the State Historical Society of Missouri, in their collections also in Columbia, Missouri.

== Family ==
He married Mary Jane Royall (1820-1879) of Columbia, Missouri in 1843, and they had three children.

== Legacy ==
Switzler Hall on the David R. Francis Quadrangle on the campus of the University of Missouri at Columbia, is named after him.

== Works ==
- Switzler, William F., et al. Switzler's illustrated history of Missouri, from 1541 to 1877. St. Louis: C. R. Barns. 1879.
- Switzler, William F. History of Boone County, Missouri. Written and comp. from the most authentic official and private sources; including a history of its townships, towns, and villages. Together with a condensed history of Missouri; the city of St. Louis ... biographical sketches and portraits of prominent citizens. St. Louis, Western Historical Company, 1882.
