= A-Plus =

A-Plus may refer to:

- A-Plus (store), an American convenience store chain
- A-Plus (rapper), American rapper and producer
- A-Plus TV, a Pakistani entertainment TV channel
- Aqil Davidson, or A-Plus, American lyricist, hip-hop artist, and record producer

== See also ==
- A+ (disambiguation)
