= Missouri State Board of Education =

State education agency overview
- Jurisdiction: State of Missouri
- Headquarters: 205 Jefferson St. Jefferson City, Missouri 65101; 38.5774029°N 92.1733817°W
- State education agency executive: Dr. Stacey Preis, Commissioner of Education
- Parent department: State of Missouri
- Website: Missouri State Board of Education Website

Missouri State Board of Education (MSBE) is Missouri's board of education, headquartered in Jefferson City. The board of education is established in Article IX, Section 2a of the Missouri Constitution. The eight members of the Board of Education are elected to staggered eight-year terms. The Board serves as the state-level governing body for career and technical education programs provided by local school districts, community colleges and four-year institutions and helps determine educational policy for the state's primary and secondary schools.

== Board Members ==
Board members include:

- Kenneth "Brooks" Miller Jr., President
- Jon Otto, Vice-President
- Jordan Bradberry
- Kerry Casey
- Michael Matousek
- Robbie Myers
- Dr. Gretchen Shull

== See also ==
- Education in the United States
- State education agency
- Missouri Department of Elementary and Secondary Education
- Missouri Department of Higher Education
