= Missouri Research and Education Network =

Separate business unit within the University of Missouri

Missouri Research and Education Network (MOREnet) is a member-driven consortium, operating as a separate business unit within the University of Missouri in Columbia, Missouri. They are primarily made up of Missouri's K-12 schools, colleges and universities, public libraries and government organizations. In addition to maintaining a computer network for Internet access to school districts and libraries in the U.S. state of Missouri. they also provide technology consulting, a technology help desk as well as professional development and training, consortium discounts and a la carte services by a team of approximately 85 subject matter experts.

== History ==
In 1991, Missouri's four-year public colleges expressed the desire to connect to the NSFnet, a precursor to today's internet. Growth was rapid, by 2002, they connected 509 Missouri public school districts, 64 higher education institutions and 125 tax-supported libraries.

1991: Organization Formed for higher ed primarily to share research electronically

1993:A pilot project with Missouri Department of Elementary and Secondary Education to include 100 K-12 school districts to include internet connection (which at the time was still an interesting, but unproved concept) as well as hands-on training and technical consultation

1995: The Missouri Secretary of State secured $500,000 for shared online resources available to the entire MOREnet consortium

1997: The MOREnet backbone increased to 45 Mbit/s, which was 30 times faster than the 1993 service

1999: The MOREnet backbone increased to 155 Mbit/s, enabling full-scale interactive video services

2003: The MOREnet backbone increased to 622 Mbit/s

2009: The MOREnet backbone was migrated to a fiber-optic infrastructure to support 10 Gbit/s (10,000 Mbit/s) capacity

2013: Awarded nearly $1 million in grant funding to 3 members for projects designed over a 3-year period to improve outcomes through the adoption of new technologies and STEM based activities, visual learning, business continuity and disaster recovery.

2013: Began a backbone fiber expansion project to bring much needed infrastructure to the un- and under-served region of southeast Missouri

2014: Upgraded network to support up to 100 Gbit/s, making MOREnet one of the first research and education networks in the country to support that speed

== Work Environment ==
In 2016, MOREnet was recognized for exemplary workplace practices from When Work Works, a national initiative, led by the partnership for the Families and Work Institute and the Society for Human Resource Management.

MOREnet practices a modified version of ROWE (Results-Only Work Envioronment). A management strategy used at MOREnet, where employees are evaluated on performance, not presence. In a ROWE, leadership focuses only on results – increasing the organization's performance while cultivating the right environment for people to manage all the demands in their lives...including work.
