= A+ =

A+ may refer to:

== Education ==
- A+ (grade), the highest grade achievable in a grading system based on letters of the alphabet
- A+ certification, the professional computer technician certification by CompTIA
- Missouri A+ schools program, a student incentives program in Missouri

== Media ==
=== Television ===
- a+ (Mexican TV network), a Mexican TV channel
- Animax (Eastern European TV channel), an anime television channel formerly known as A+
- A-Plus TV, a television station in Pakistan

=== Music ===
- "A-Plus", a song by Hieroglyphics on the album 3rd Eye Vision
- A+ (EP), an EP by Hyuna
- "A+", a song by Noga Erez on the album The Vandalist
- A augmented triad, a chord made up of the notes A, C#, and E#

=== Other media ===
- A+ (film), a 2004 Spanish drama
- A+ (magazine), an Apple II periodical published by Ziff Davis, from 1983 to 1989
- A Plus (website), a social news company based in New York City

== People ==
- A+ (rapper) (born Andre Levins, 1982), American rapper
- A-Plus (rapper) (born Adam Carter, 1974), American rapper
- Pluss (born Asheton Hogan), also known as A+, American songwriter and record producer

== Other uses ==
- A+ (blood type)
- A+ (programming language), a dialect of APL with aggressive extensions
- A+ (yacht), built in 2012 as Topaz
- A-Plus (store), an American convenience store chain owned and operated by Sunoco
