= Bright Flight (Missouri scholarship) =

Bright Flight is a Missouri merit-based scholarship with a current maximum amount of $3,000 per annum to Missouri's qualifying graduating high school seniors who enroll in a Missouri-accredited college or university. The actual amount of the scholarship is determined based upon state funding and is sometimes less than the maximum amount. From June 2004 to July 2005, 8390 students were enrolled in the Bright Flight program, which totaled over $15 million in state expenditures.

== Qualifications and renewal ==
- To qualify for the Bright Flight maximum award of $3000 per year, a student must be in the top 3% of his or her statewide high school class as determined by normalized tests, the ACT and SAT composite scores. To date and for several years, a score of 31 or above on the ACT or an SAT-equivalent score qualifies, but the score can change each year. A composite score of 31 will be needed to qualify for the college freshmen in the 2020–2021 school year.
- The law also qualifies students in the 4th and 5th percentiles to receive a $1000 per year maximum scholarship; however, the Missouri Legislature has not funded this award in recent years, and these students have received no actual financial award. An ACT composite score of 30 (or above) qualified for the 4th and 5th percentile for college freshmen in the 2020–2021 school year and recent years.
- To continue receiving the scholarship, students must maintain at least a 2.5 GPA in college and maintain full-time student status to renew the scholarship, which can be renewed for up to five years.
- Students must not be pursuing a degree in theology or divinity.
- Bright Flight students must attend school continuously. They cannot cease attending school, except to work for a non-profit organization, hold a government job, or serve in the armed services. Academic interruption must not exceed 27 months.

== History ==
Appropriated by the Missouri General Assembly in 1986, students initially received a statutory maximum of $2000 per year. Many students and higher education officials have observed that tuition expenses at the University of Missouri, for example, were below $2000 in 1987 and thus were fully covered by Bright Flight at its introduction. In 2017, following a period of increases in tuition expenses that easily outpaced inflation, Bright Flight covered only a fraction of the more than $11,000 a typical student spent on tuition at the University of Missouri.

== Recent developments ==
On August 12, 2010, state budget cuts reduced the amount from $2000/year to $1500/year for that year.

On November 25, 2013, Missouri Governor Jay Nixon announced at a college preparatory school in Kansas City, Missouri that he included a proposal in Missouri's 2015 budget that would offer an option to receive up to $5,000 extra per year if recipients stayed in Missouri after finishing college for the number of years they received Bright Flight.

On July 21, 2020, Universities in Missouri received an email from the Missouri Department of Higher Education and Workforce Development that noted, “The General Assembly appropriated $20,176,666 in Bright Flight funds for state fiscal year 2021. However, based on current economic conditions the Governor has restricted almost $6.5 million of those funds, significantly reducing the amount of funds available to the program. As a result, the estimated Bright Flight award amounts have been reduced from $3,000 to $1,800 to ensure expenditures do not exceed the available funds. We regret the impact this unavoidable reduction will have on students and we will consider a mid-year increase to award amounts if the restricted funds are released. Final award amounts for both programs will be announced in August.” This email reflected the budget cuts indicated by the Governor in the previous month.
