= Switzler Hall =

- U.S. Historic district – Contributing property
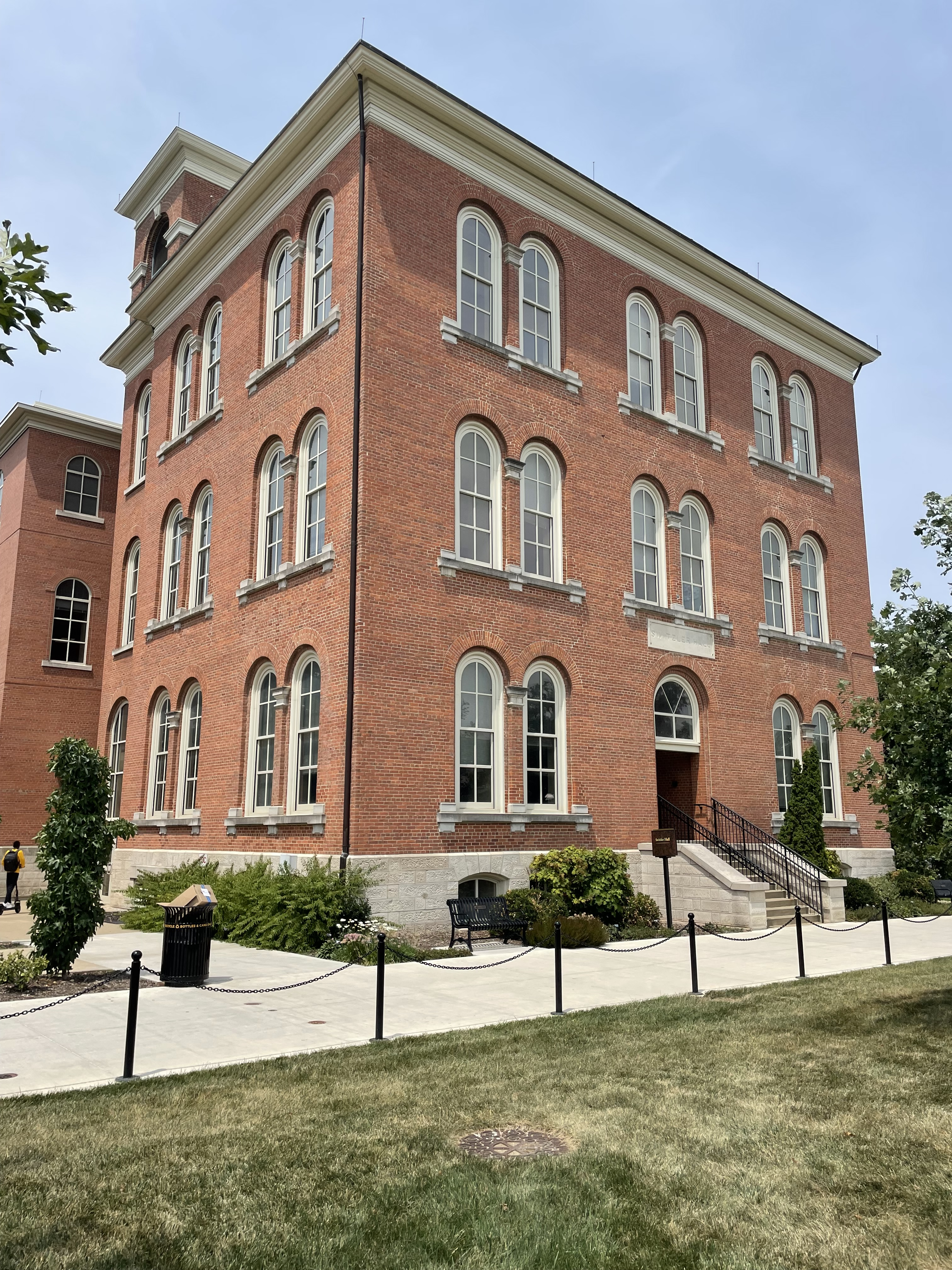
- Switzler Hall on July 30, 2026

- Location within Missouri Location within the United States
- Location: Columbia, Missouri
- Coordinates: 38°56′48″N 92°19′45″W
- Built: 1871
- Architect: Walsh, Smith, & Jugenfeld
- Architectural style: Late 19th- and 20th-Century Revivals, Late Victorian
- Part of: Francis Quadrangle Historic District (ID73001036)
- Added to NRHP: December 18, 1973

Switzler Hall is an academic hall on the campus of the University of Missouri in Columbia, Missouri. The building was completed in 1872, and it is located on the west side of the David R. Francis Quadrangle. Switzler Hall is the oldest academic building and second oldest structure on campus after the Chancellor's Residence. The building was named after Colonel William Franklin Switzler, editor and publisher of the Missouri Statesman and supporter of the University. Today the building houses the Department of Communication, Women's and Gender Studies, and the Special Degrees Program. The building is listed on the National Register of Historic Places.

== Bell Tower ==
One component of Switzler Hall is the bell tower. The bell was given to the University by Major James S. Rollins and is inscribed with the words "Nunc occasion est et tempus," which translated is, "Now is the occasion and the time." While the bell originally rang for classes until 1936, it now only rings for Tap Day, the Mizzou 39 ceremony, and to honor the passing of members of the MU family. During the time the bell was used to signal the start of classes, it was a longstanding prank among many student to steal the bell's clapper, so that the signal for classes to start would not be sounded.

== Silo ==
Switzler Hall is also home to a mysterious three-story "silo" through the center of the structure. The cylindrical, 8-foot-diameter, brick, silo rises from the basement to the roof of the building. In the middle of the silo, a solid wooden structure, which resembles some sort of dumbwaiter device or ladder, also rises to the attic. The purpose of the silo is still unknown. Proposed original uses include a means of roof access, part of a heating and cooling system, a drop tower for physics students, or an elaborate means of venting chemical work on the lower floors.
