= Missouri A+ schools program =

Statewide education reform program in Missouri

The Missouri A+ Schools Program is a legislated, statewide reform effort that offers a framework and incentives for providing quality education for all students in Missouri.

== Qualifications ==
Student financial incentives will be available for a period of four years after high school graduation.

=== Student eligibility ===
Each student must enter into a written agreement with the school prior to high school graduation and:

- Have attended a designated A+ School for three consecutive years prior to high school graduation;
- Graduated from high school with an overall grade point average of two and five-tenths points or higher on a four-point scale, or graduated from a high school with documented mastery of institutionally identified skills that would equate to a two and five-tenths grade point average or higher;
- Have at least a ninety-five percent attendance record overall for grades nine through twelve;
- Performed fifty hours of unpaid tutoring or mentoring for younger students; and
- Maintained a record of good citizenship and avoidance of the unlawful use of drugs and/or alcohol;
- Score "proficient" or "advanced" on the Algebra I End-of-Course Exam

=== Ongoing eligibility ===
Each participating student must during the four-year period of incentive availability:

- Have enrolled and attend on a full-time basis a Missouri public community college or vocational or technical school; and
- Maintain a grade point average of two and five-tenths points or higher on a four-point scale;

== Funding ==
In September 2014, the Missouri Department of Higher Education announced a possible reduction of reimbursement to current and future college students. According to Leroy Wade, deputy commissioner of the Missouri Department of Higher Education, the changes could take place as early as January 2015.
