= Missouri Department of Higher Education =

Missouri Department of Higher Education & Workforce Development
- Founded: August 28, 2019
- Purpose: Educational Oversight
- Headquarters: 301 W. High Street; Jefferson City, Missouri, U.S.
- Coordinates: 38.577618°N 92.171295°W
- Commissioner: Leroy Wade
- Main organ: state agency
- Parent organization: Coordinating Board for Higher Education
- Website: dhewd.mo.gov

In January 2019, Gov. Mike Parson signed Executive Order 19-03 to move the Division of Workforce Development and the Missouri Economic Research and Information Center (MERIC) under the Department of Higher Education. The department transformation became legally effective on August 28, 2019, when Governor Parson signed Executive Order 19-15, to form the Missouri Department of Higher Education and Workforce Development.

== See also ==
- Education in Missouri
- List of colleges and universities in Missouri
- Missouri Research and Education Network
- List of unaccredited institutions of higher education
