= Francis Quadrangle =

- David R. Francis Quadrangle Historic District
- U.S. National Register of Historic Places
- U.S. Historic district
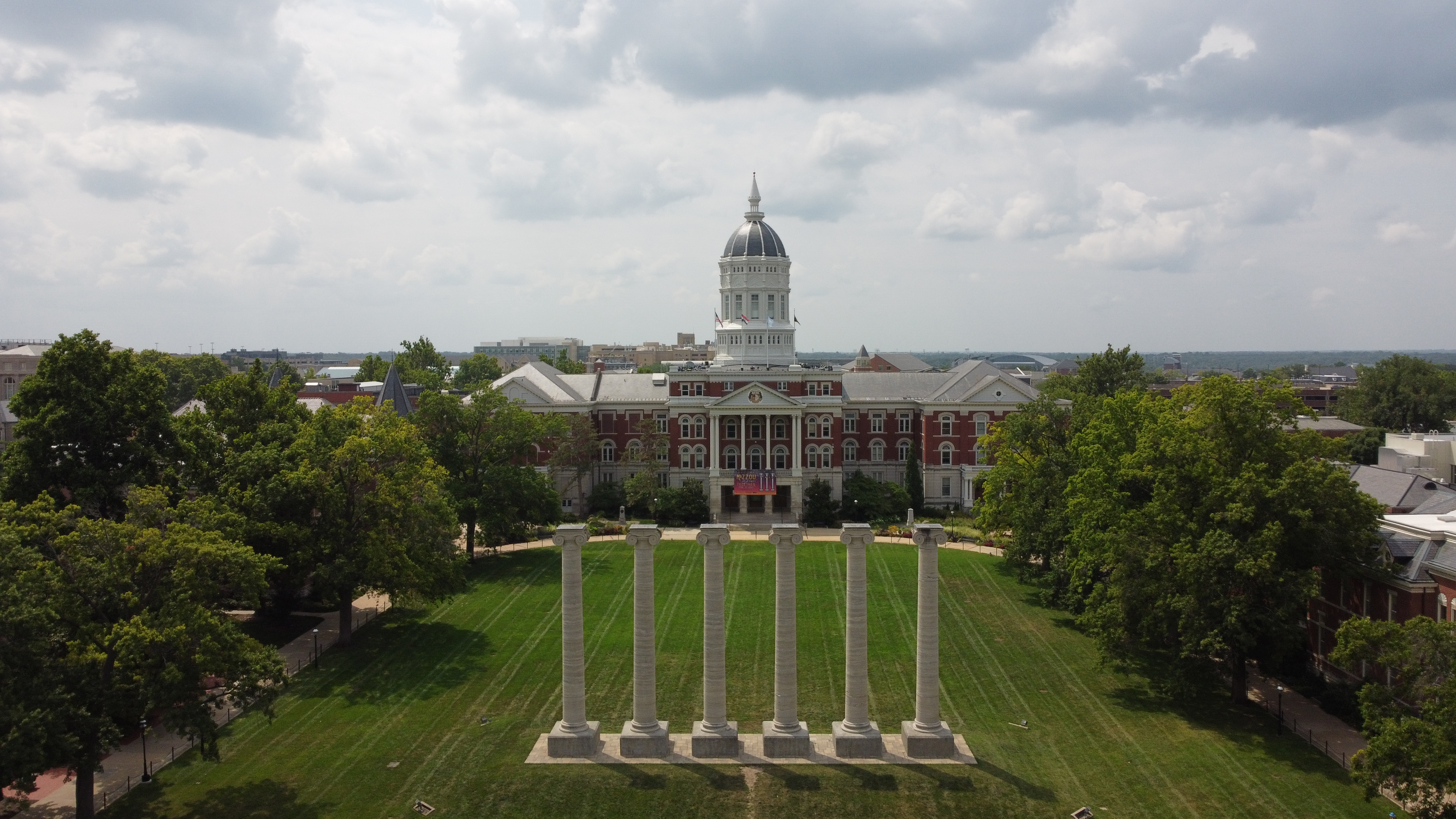

- Location within Missouri Location within the United States
- Location: Bounded by Conley Ave. and Elm, 6th, and 9th Sts., Columbia, Missouri
- Coordinates: 38°56′46″N 92°19′44″W
- Area: 32.9 acres (13.3 ha)
- Built: 1867
- Architect: Morris Frederick Bell, William Lincoln Garver
- Architectural style: Late 19th And 20th Century Revivals, Late Victorian
- NRHP reference No.: 73001036
- Added to NRHP: December 18, 1973

David R. Francis Quadrangle is the historical center of the University of Missouri in Columbia, Missouri. Known as The Quad, it is the oldest part of Red Campus and adjacent to Downtown Columbia at the south end of the Avenue of the Columns. At its center are six Ionic columns, all that remains of the original university building Academic Hall. Twelve buildings front the modern quadrangle including the domed main administration building Jesse Hall, the tallest building in Columbia. The Quad was designed and constructed by architect Morris Frederick Bell and his assistant William Lincoln Garver. It is named after Missouri governor David R. Francis. Eighteen structures, including the entire quad and most of Red Campus are listed as the Francis Quadrangle National Historic District. An obelisk, the original tombstone of Thomas Jefferson, stands in front of the Chancellor's Residence. It was gifted to the University by Jefferson's descendants in recognition of Missouri's ties to Virginia. In front of Jesse Hall stand markers honoring university president Richard Henry Jesse and Missouri governor David R. Francis. Nearby is another obelisk in memory of Missouri's first U.S. senator David Barton, The Missouri School of Journalism is located at the northeast corner of The Quad, comprising Walter Williams Hall, Neff Hall, Gannet Hall, along with the Reynolds Journalism Institute. To the west, Switzler Hall is the oldest academic building on campus, though the Residence on the Quad, home of the chancellor, is the oldest building overall. The University of Missouri College of Engineering completes the west side. Pickard Hall is currently closed due to radiation contamination from turn of the century experiments. Swallow Hall was recently renovated and houses the Departments of Anthropology, Visual Studies and Ancient Mediterranean Studies.

== History ==
At the genesis of the University of Missouri the only building among a great forest campus was Academic Hall. Constructed by architect Stephen Hills from 1840 to 1843 out of red brick and limestone quarried from the bluff of Hinkson Creek, this was the only academic building of the university for many years. In 1843 a mansion was built next door for the President of the University of Missouri. During the American Civil War, Union troops occupied Academic Hall and burned the ancient forest and parts of the library for firewood. Academic Hall was damaged and the president mansion was burned in 1865. After the war, the university sued the federal government for damages, eventually winning and building the Memorial Gateway on the Avenue of the Columns with the money. A new President's Mansion was built in 1867 and still stands today. The need for expansion after the war necessitated the construction of Scientific Hall, now Switzler Hall in 1872.

The burning of Academic Hall on a cold January night in 1892 ushered in a time of great change for the university. There was much support in the Missouri Legislature to move the University to Sedalia. The Governor of Missouri, David R. Francis, sent a telegram to the students of the university assuring them that he would fight to keep the campus in Columbia. He later traveled to Columbia to address the citizens, faculty, and students. After calling for a special session of the Missouri Legislature he was able to appropriate $250,000 for the rebuilding. The University of Missouri was rebuilt in a quad around the columns, with "New Academic Hall" later renamed Jesse Hall on the south, and the Avenue of the Columns on the North.

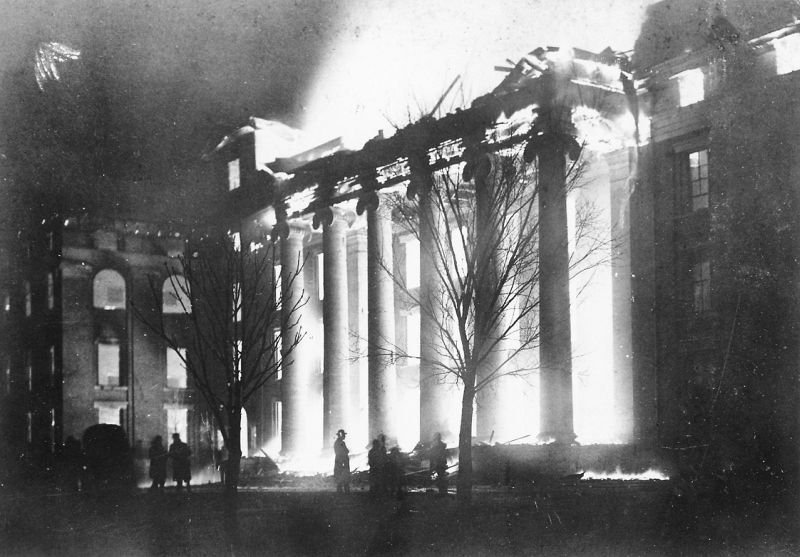
Academic Hall fire

On October 23, 2010 the quad was featured as the location of an ESPN's College GameDay. An ESPN record of over 18,000 fans showed up.

== Buildings ==
=== Geology Building ===
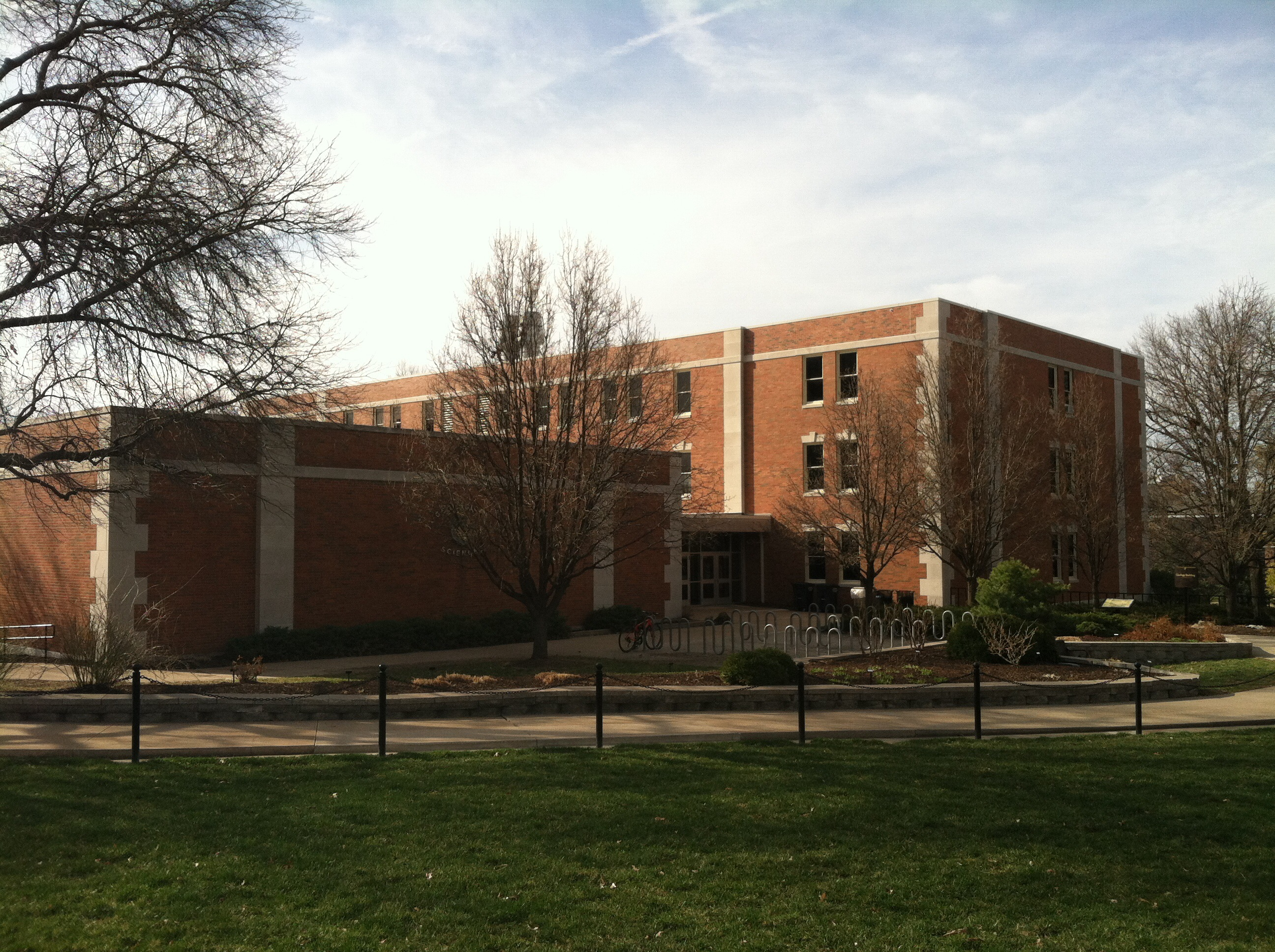
The Geology Building

The Geology Building is the newest stand-alone building on The Quad.

=== Hill Hall ===
Hill Hall was built in 1950 and named after former President of The University Albert Ross Hill.

=== Jesse Hall ===
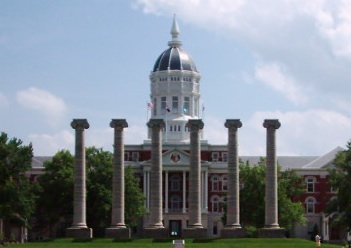
Jesse Hall behind the Columns

Jesse Hall was constructed in 1892 as the "New Academic Hall". It was later renamed after MU president Richard Henry Jesse. The dome rises nine stories above the quad, and is one of the most recognized symbols of MU. It was designed by architect Morris Frederick Bell, and serves as the administrative center for the University of Missouri–Columbia.

=== Lafferre Hall ===
The Engineering Building was built in 1892 and lies on the west side of the quad. After a significant donation, the building is now called Lafferre Hall.

=== Pickard Hall ===
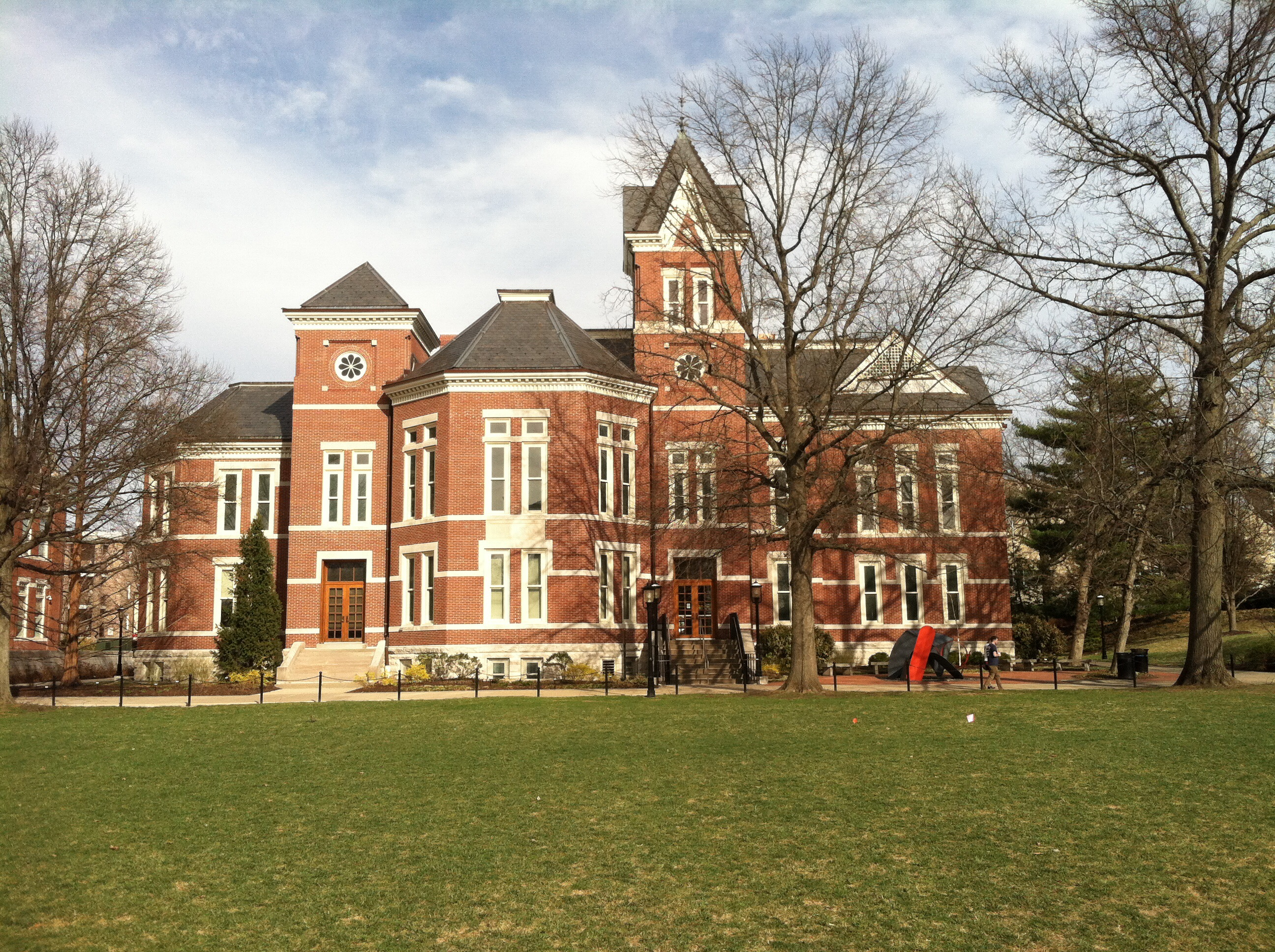
Pickard Hall from the Quad

Pickard Hall was built in 1892 and contained the MU Art and Archaeology Museum until 2013, when it was closed due to latent radiation from experiments dating 1910-1930. It was named after professor of archaeology and art history John Pickard.

=== Residence on the Quad ===
The Residence on The Quad was built in 1867 and stands on the East side of the quad. It is the oldest building left standing on campus. Thomas Jefferson's original tombstone stands between this building and The Columns. The Residence is intended to be the official home of the University's chancellor.

=== Sociology ===
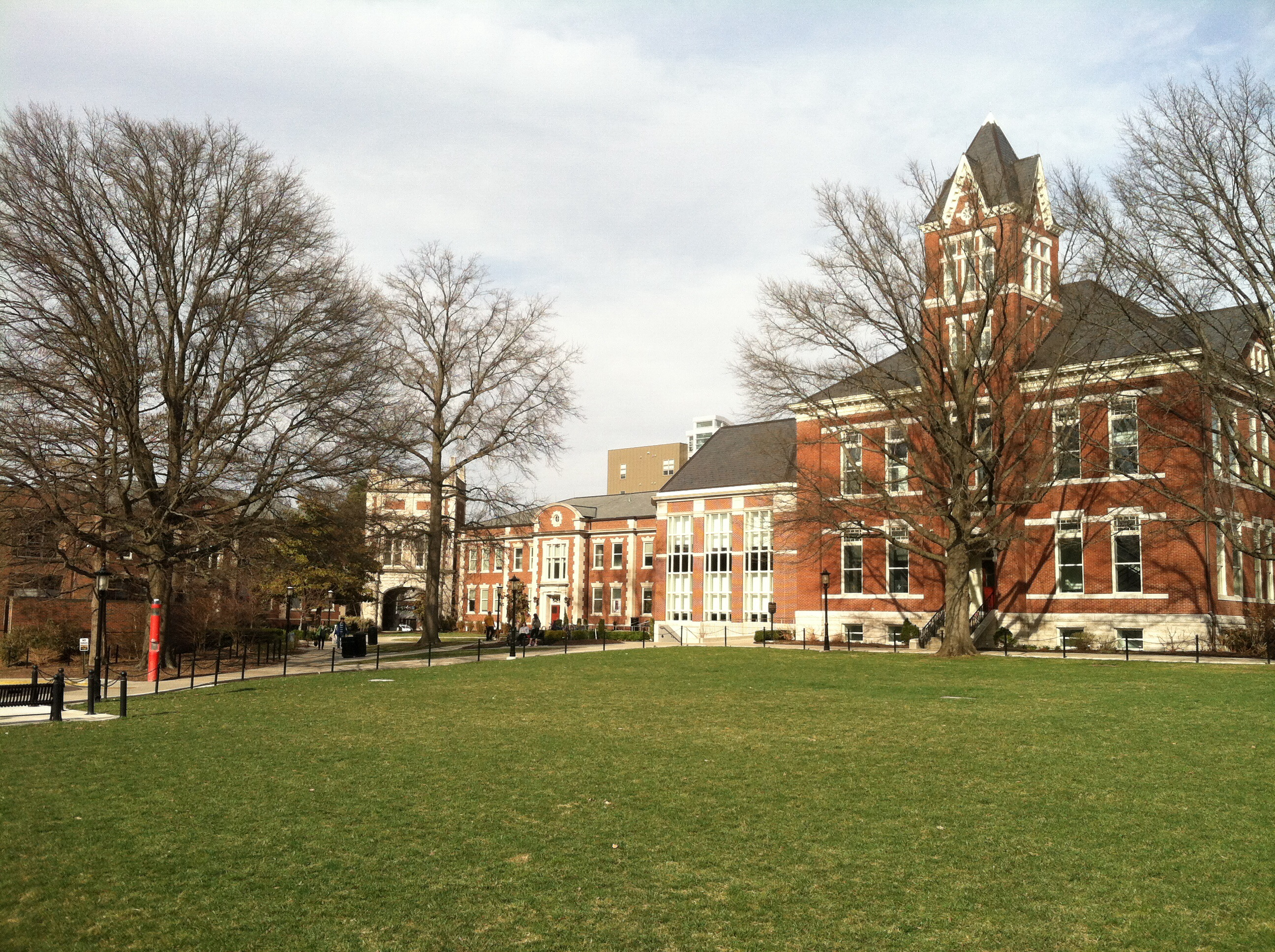
The original Sociology building has a four-story tower

The Sociology building was built in 1892 and stands near the northeast corner of the quad. The building has been renovated and turned into the Donald W. Reynolds Journalism Institute.

=== Swallow Hall ===
Swallow Hall was built in 1893 and stands on the southeast corner. It is named after George Clinton Swallow, Missouri's first state geologist. Today the building holds the Museum of Anthropology.

=== Switzler Hall ===
Switzler Hall was constructed in 1871 as the "Scientific Building". It is the oldest academic building left standing on campus. Switzler Hall is named after curator William Franklin Switzler. One of the notable attractions of Switzler Hall is the bell tower. The bell was given to the University by Major James S. Rollins and is inscribed with the words "Nunc occasion est et tempus," which translated is, "Now is the occasion and the time." The bell rang each hour classes were in session until 1936.

== Monuments ==
=== The Columns ===
The Columns that once supported Academic Hall designed by Stephen Hills now stand in the middle of the quad. The Columns are the only remaining part of Academic Hall after it burned on January 9, 1892. In August 1893 the Board of Curators voted to remove the Columns because they thought that they were unsafe and ugly. The Columns were inspected and found that the foundations were sound. Local support for keeping the Columns changed the Board's mind and the vote was reversed in December 1893. Today, The Columns are the second-most photographed landmarks in the state of Missouri, next to the Gateway Arch in St. Louis.

=== Thomas Jefferson's tombstone ===
Thomas Jefferson's original tombstone stands on the east side of the quad. Jefferson's original tombstone was given to Mizzou by his heirs in July 1883 due to Mizzou being the first University founded within Thomas Jefferson's Louisiana Purchase.

The plaque on the gravestone reads "This original marker, placed at the grave of Thomas Jefferson at Monticello, Virginia in 1826, constructed from his own design, was presented July 4, 1883, by the Jefferson heirs to the University of Missouri. First state university to be founded in the Louisiana Territory purchased from France during President Jefferson's administration. The obelisk, dedicated on this campus at commencement June 4, 1885, commemorates Thomas Jefferson, third president of the United States, whose faith in the future of western America and whose confidence in the people has shaped our national ideals; commemorates the author of the Declaration of Independence and of the Virginia statute for religious freedom, founder of the University of Virginia, fosterer of public education in the United States."

And under these words it reads (the original epitaph)

"Here was buried Thomas Jefferson Author of the Declaration of American Independence of the Statute of Virginia for religious freedom and FATHER of the University of Virginia"

=== Francis Marker ===
As tribute to former governor of Missouri, David R. Francis, a statue of stands just northeast of the entrance to Jesse Hall. It is a tradition that before an exam a student will rub his nose to receive an A on the exam. Due to the tradition's popularity the statue's nose has been replaced three times since its dedication.

=== Barton Marker ===
A stone marker memorializing Missouri's first senator David Barton stands at the southwest corner of The Quad.

=== British House of Parliament Stone ===
A Stone from the House of Parliament stands outside the J-School.

=== Chinese Lions ===
Two ancient Chinese lions guard the archway to 9th Street at the northeastern side of The Quad.

== Gallery ==
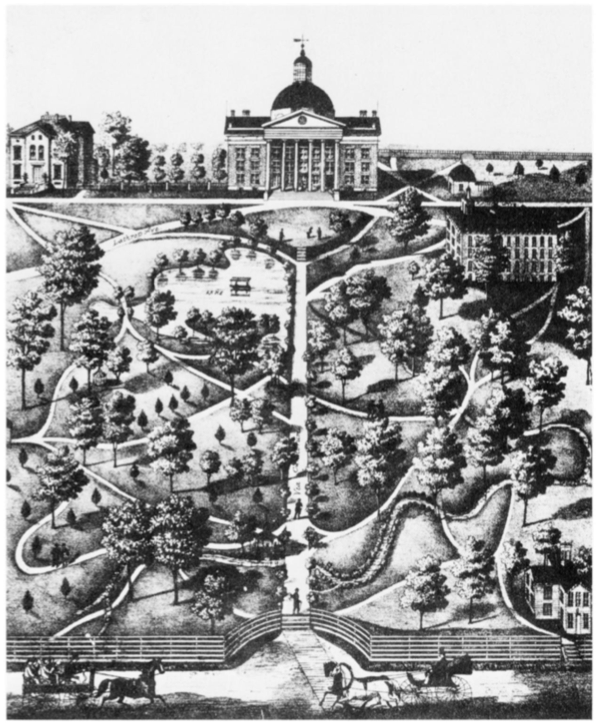
Drawing of Academic Hall, Switzler Hall, and the President's House around 1875

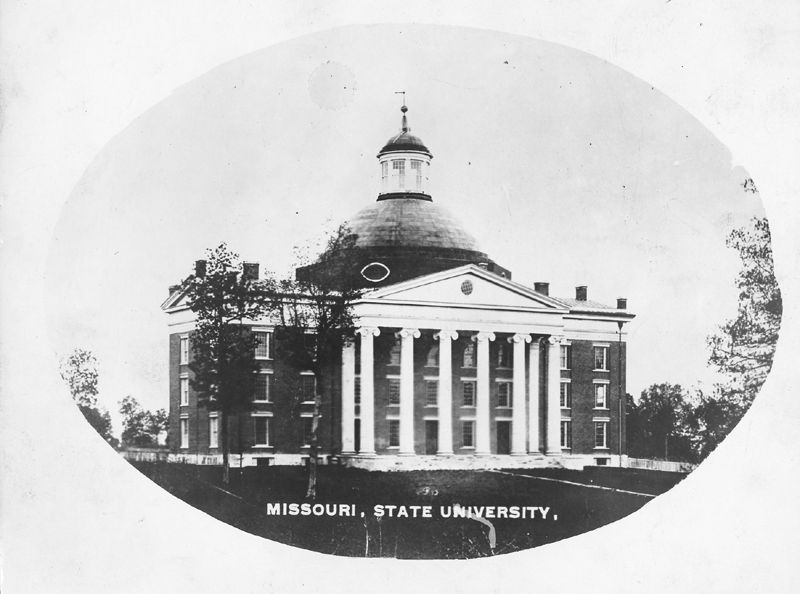
Academic Hall as it was originally constructed, sometime before 1885

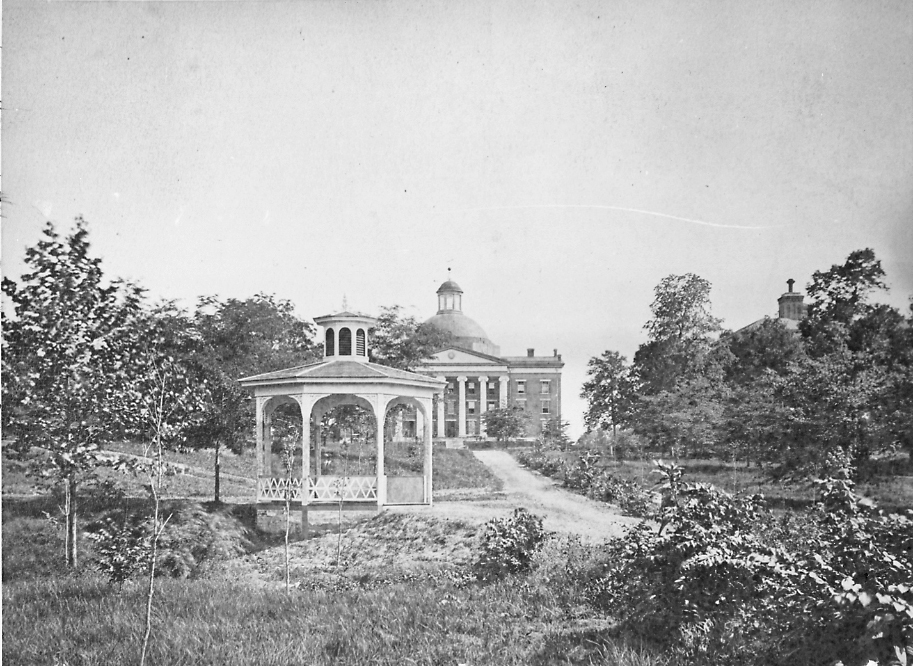
Academic Hall and Chalybeate Spring in the 1880s

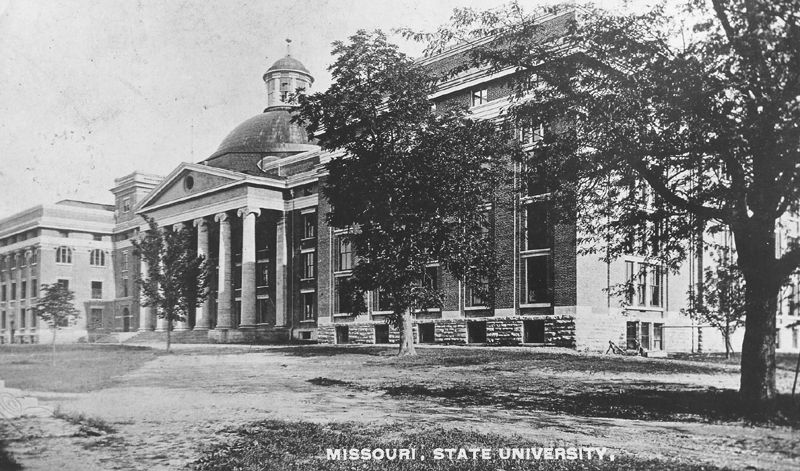
Academic Hall with the expanded east and west wings, perhaps in 1890-1892

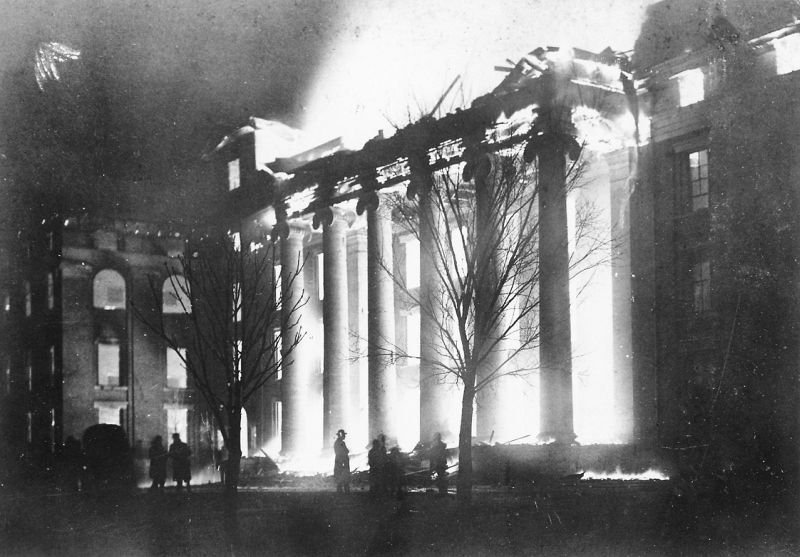
The burning of Academic Hall in 1892. Flame can be seen licking the columns of the portico

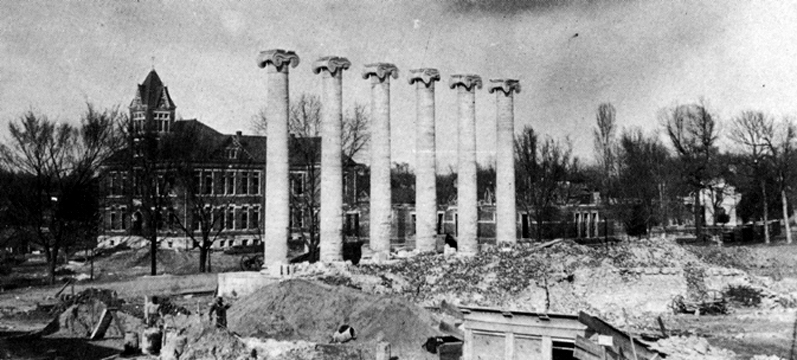
The Columns stand in the rubble of Academic Hall after the 1892 fire, the new buildings of Francis Quad in the background

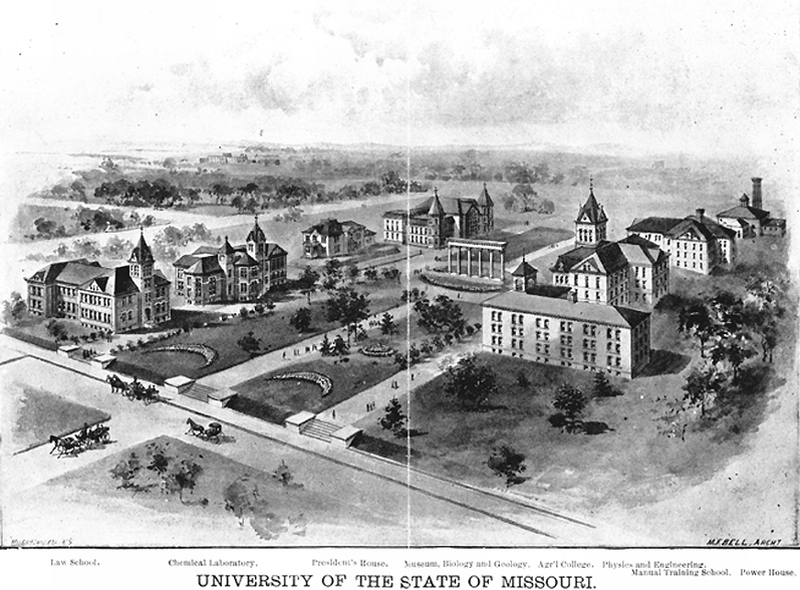
Plans for the creation of the Quad drawn by architect Morris Frederick Bell

Jesse Hall around 1895

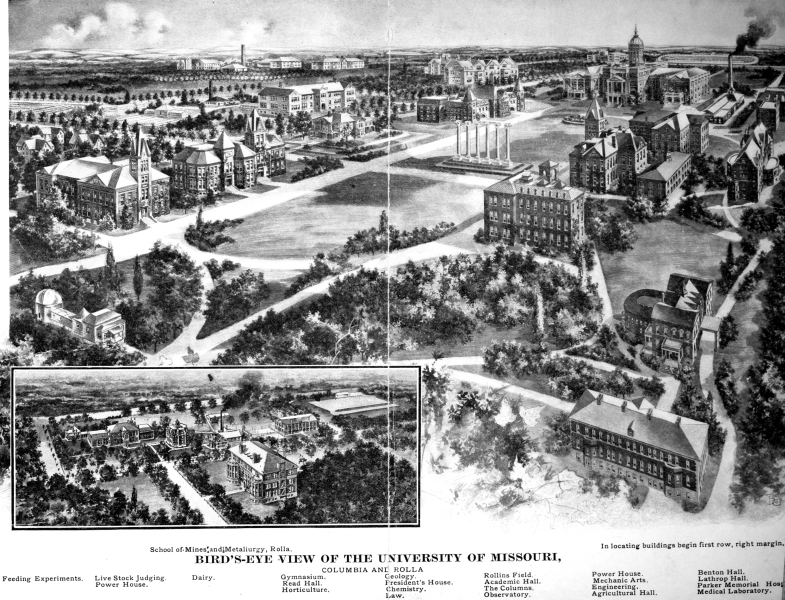
Artist rendition of The Quad around 1905

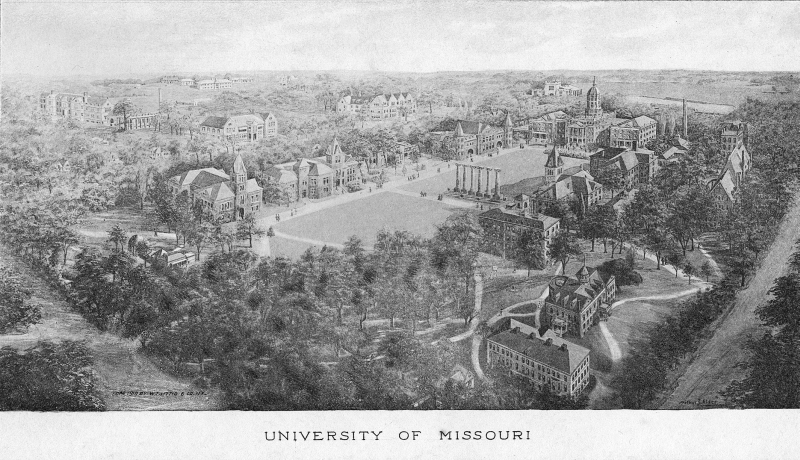
Artist rendition of The Quad around 1910

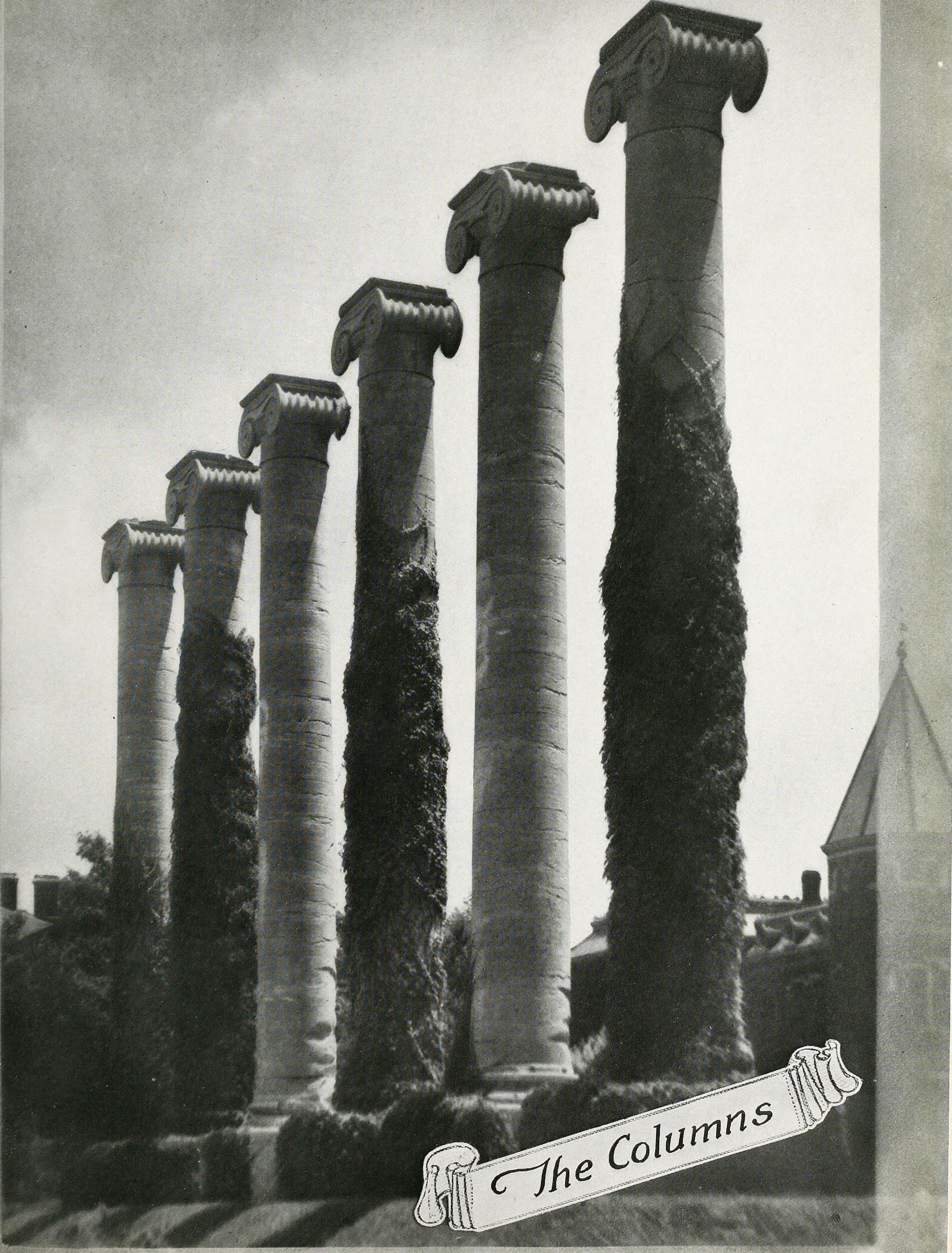
1922 Savitar yearbook picture of ivy covered Columns

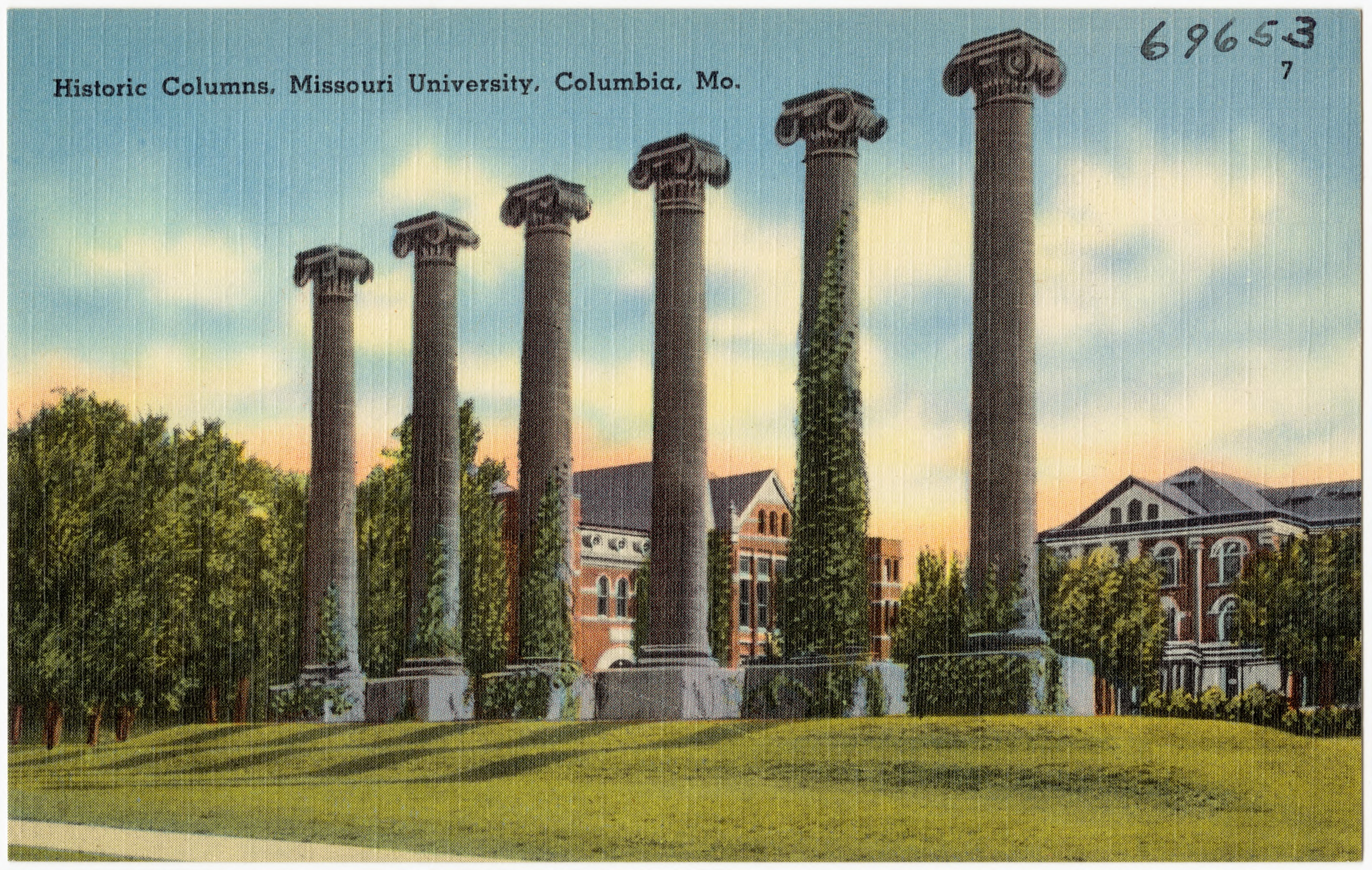
1930-45 postcard of the "Historic Columns Missouri University"

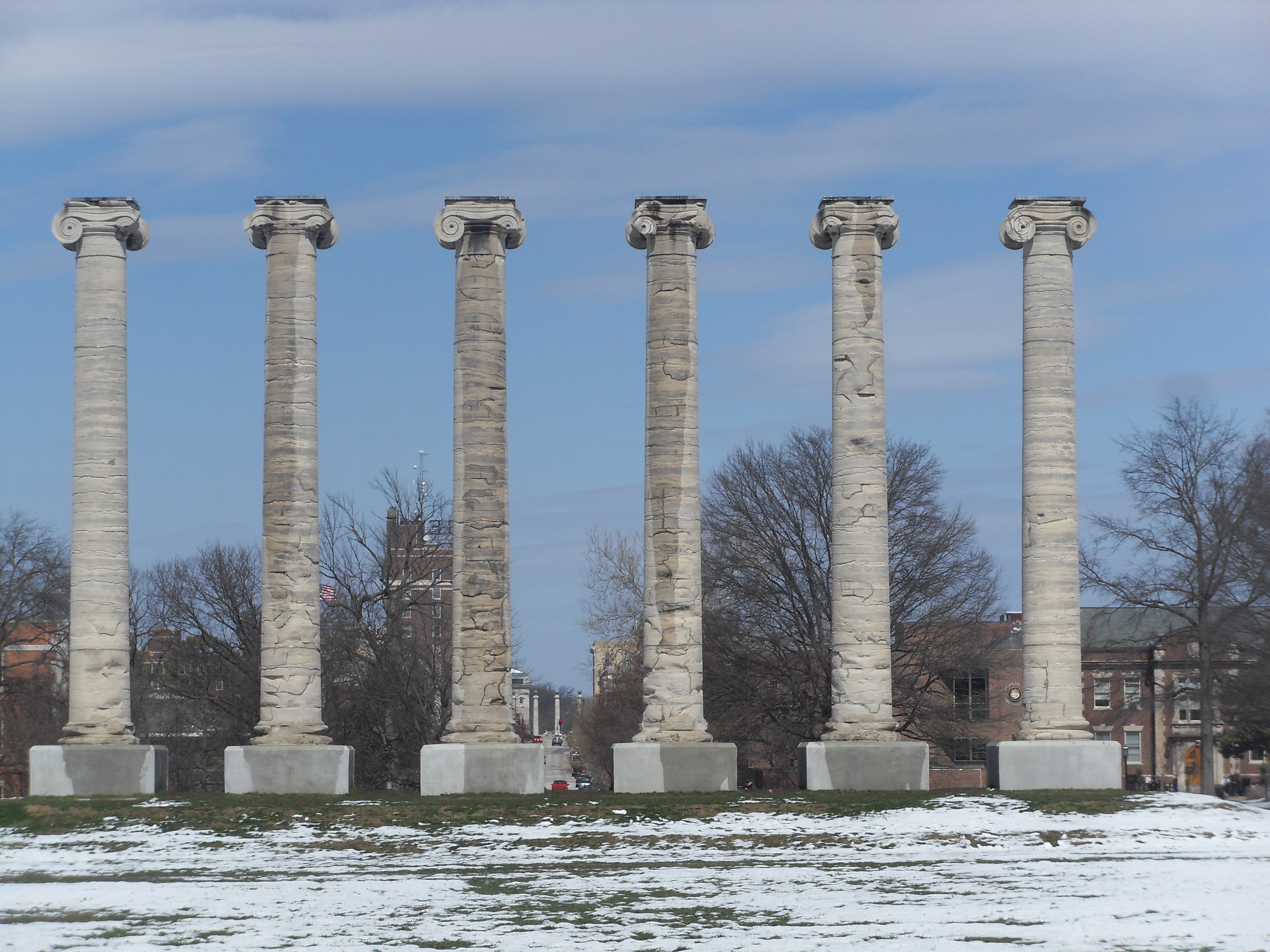
The Columns in the snow

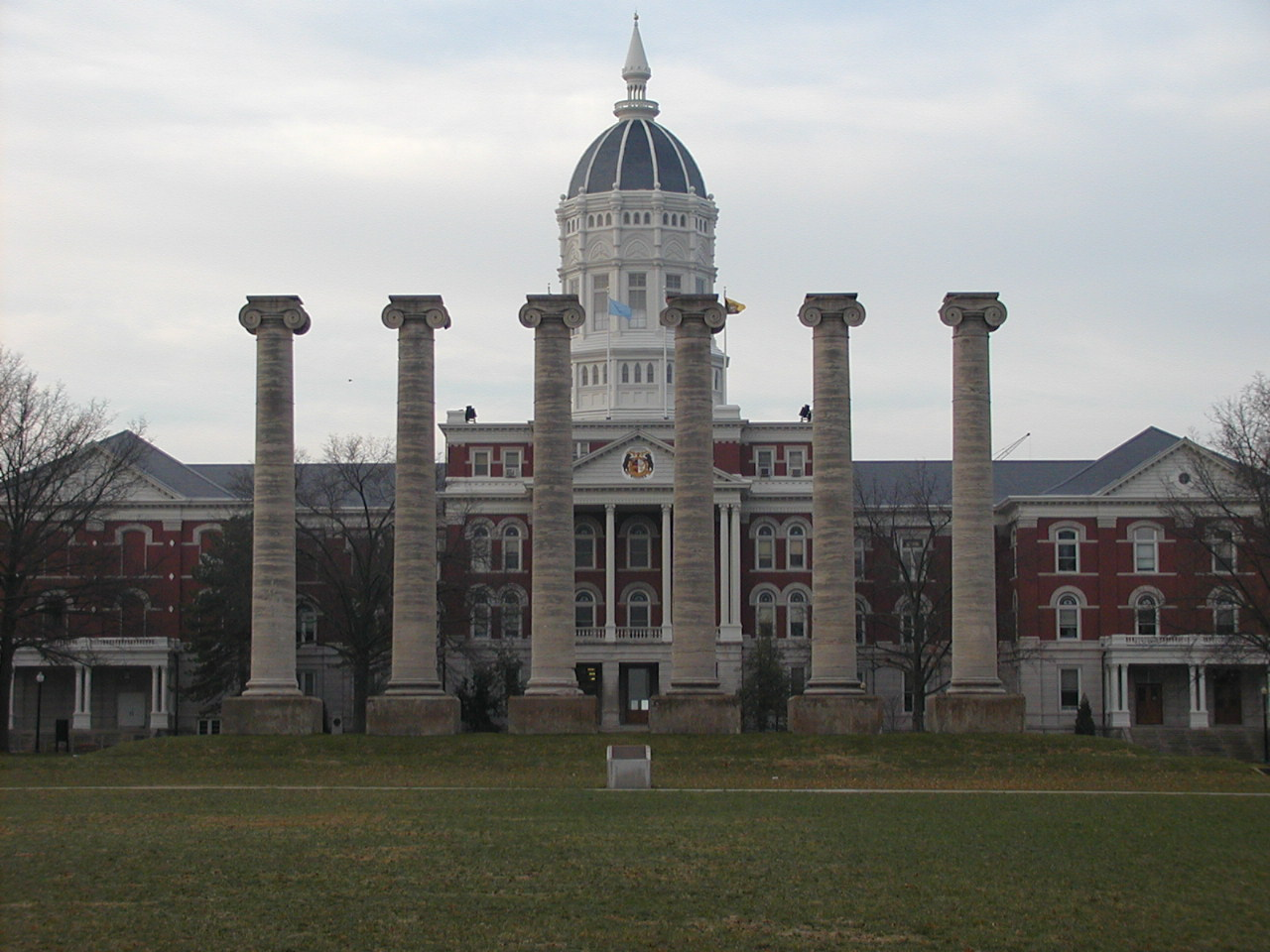
The Columns with Jesse Hall in the background

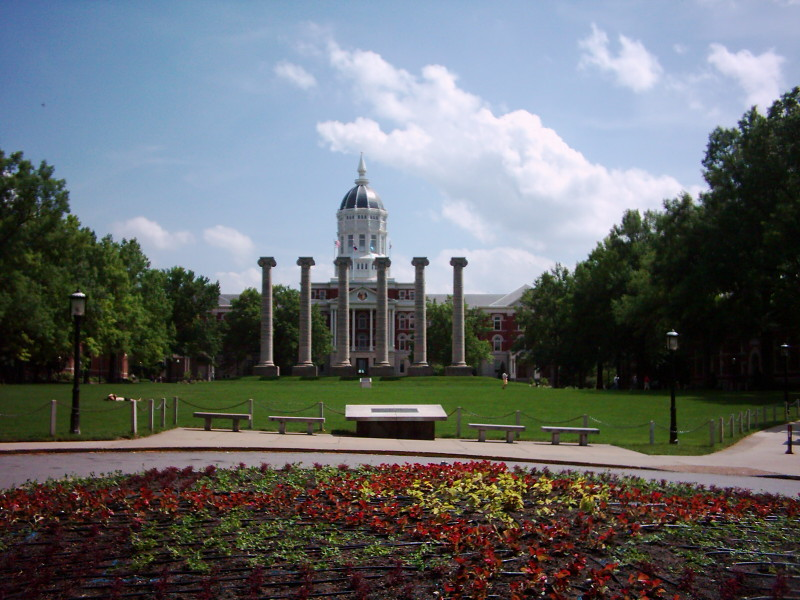
From the Avenue of the Columns

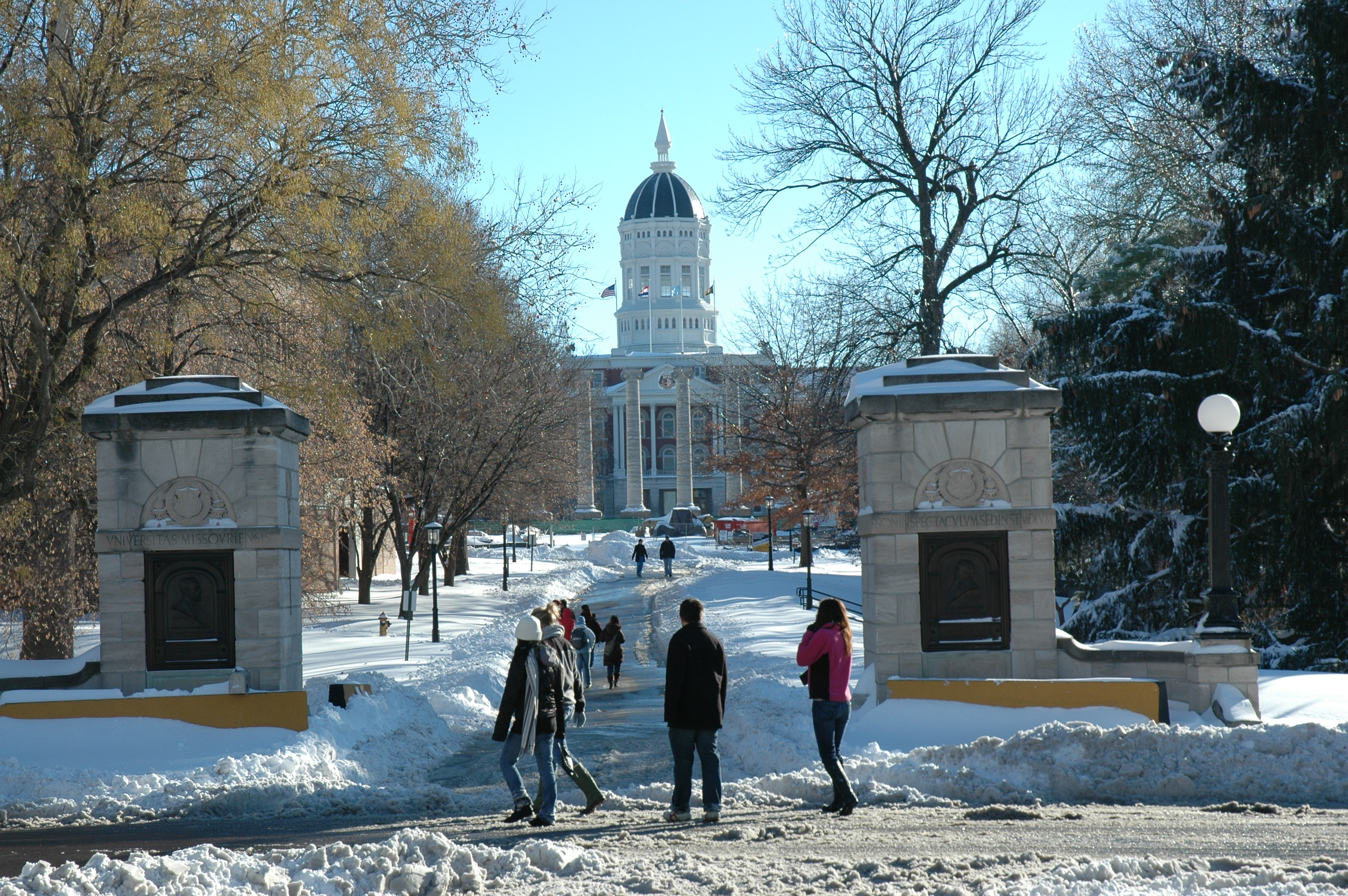
From Elm Street in snow

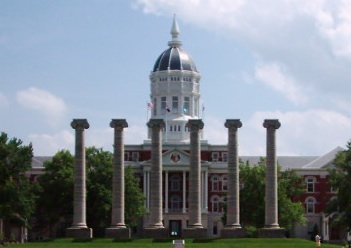
Jesse and the Columns

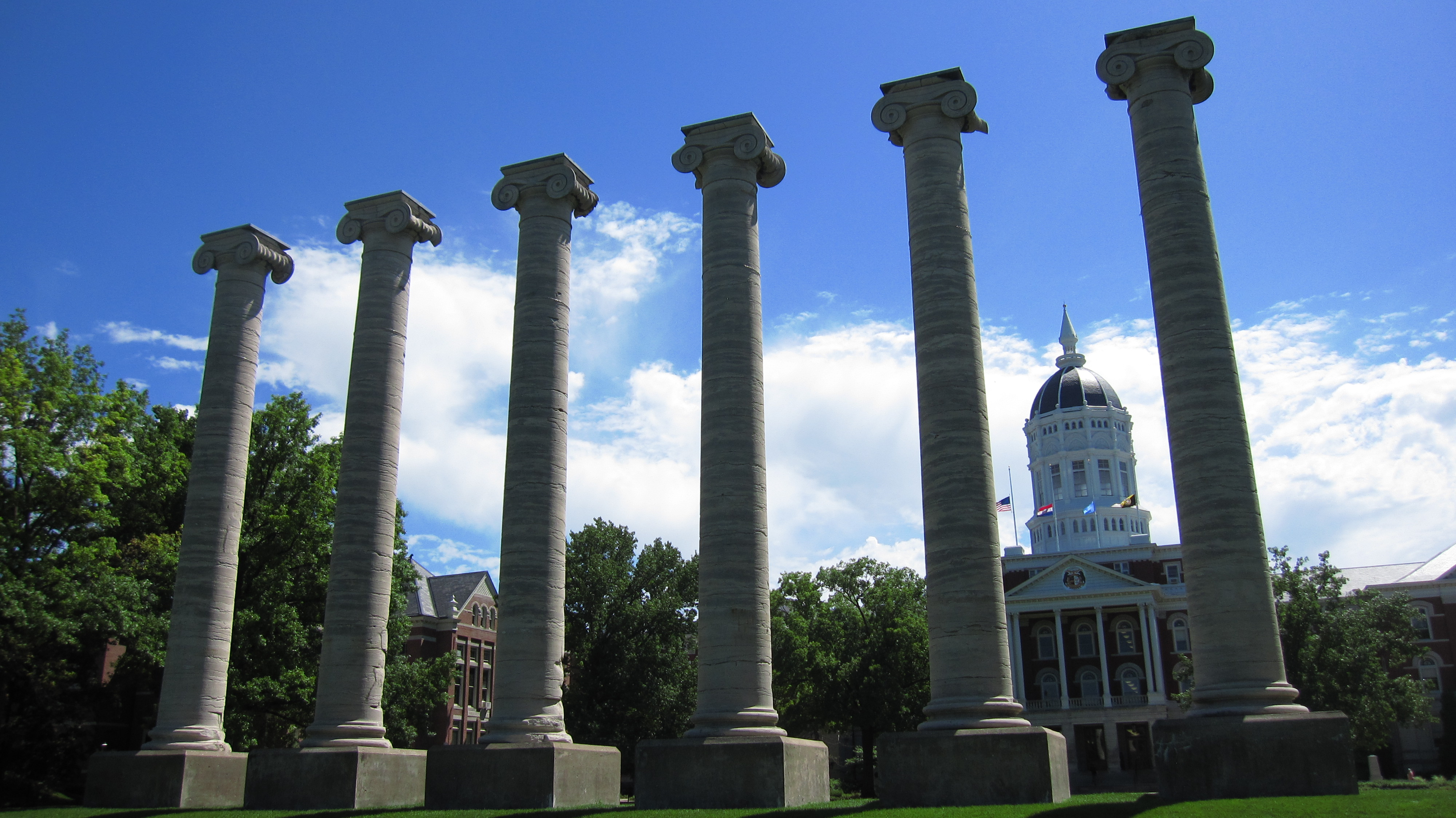
The Quad in 2009

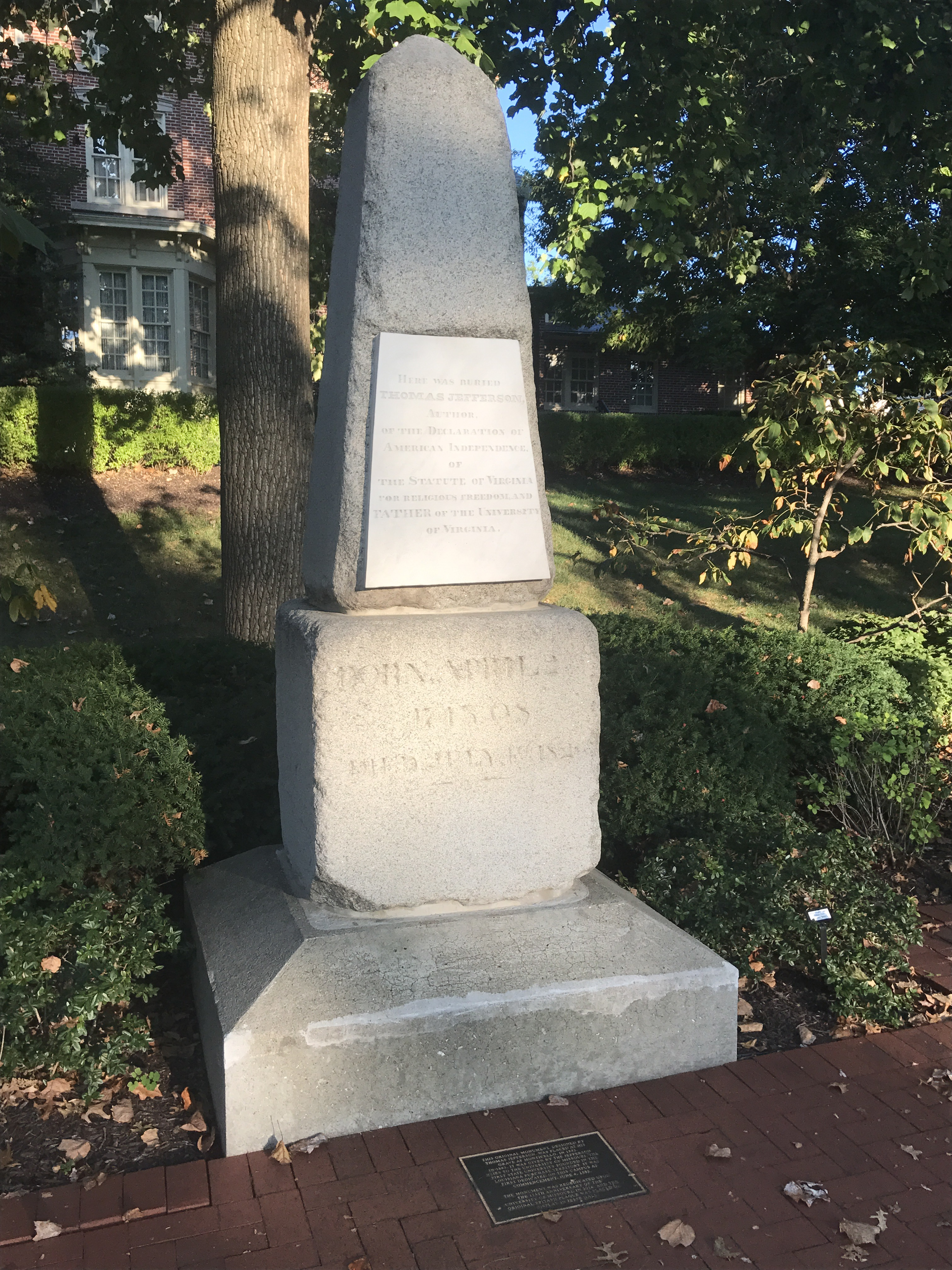
Original tombstone of Thomas Jefferson

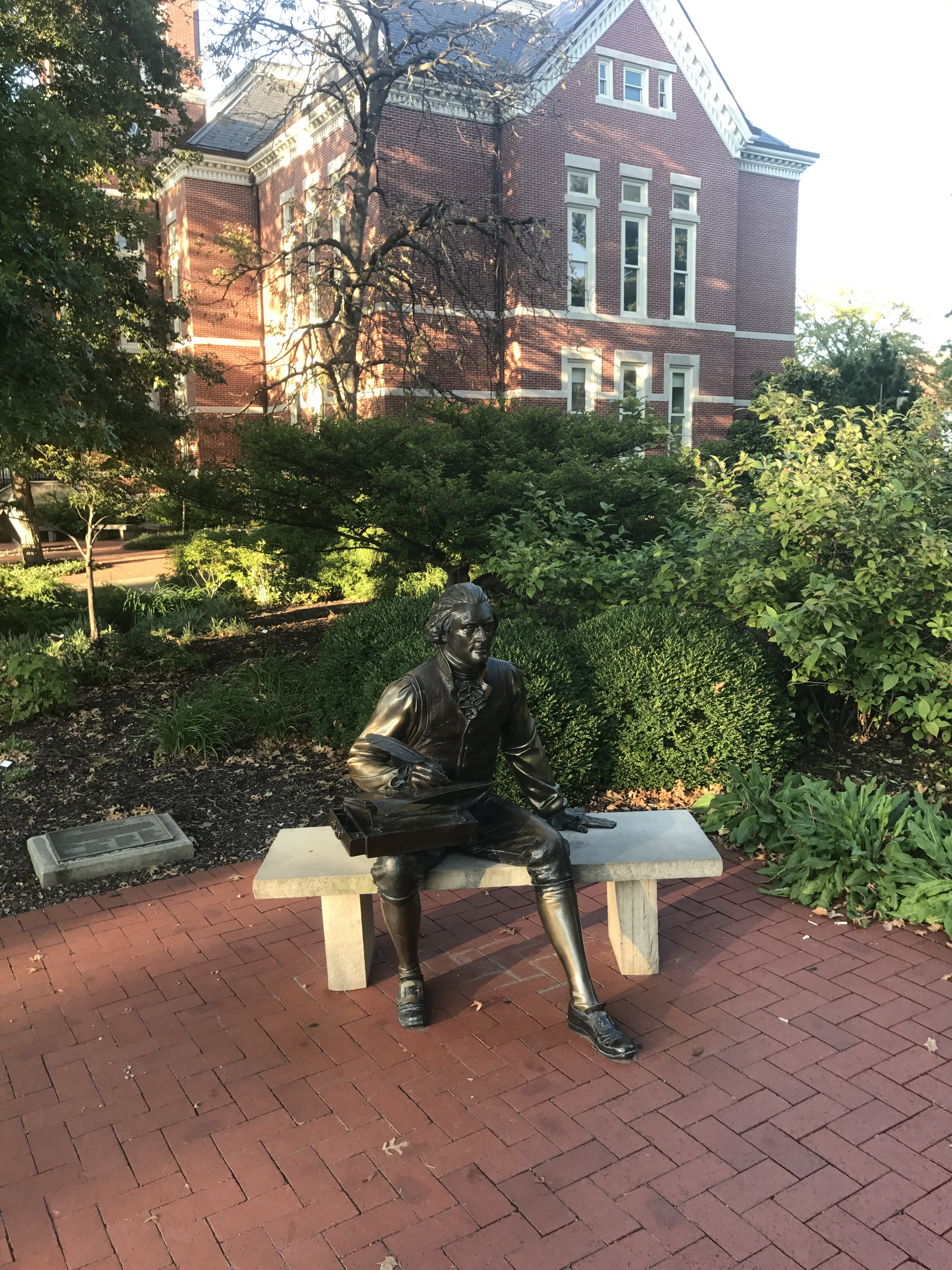
Bronze statue of Thomas Jefferson

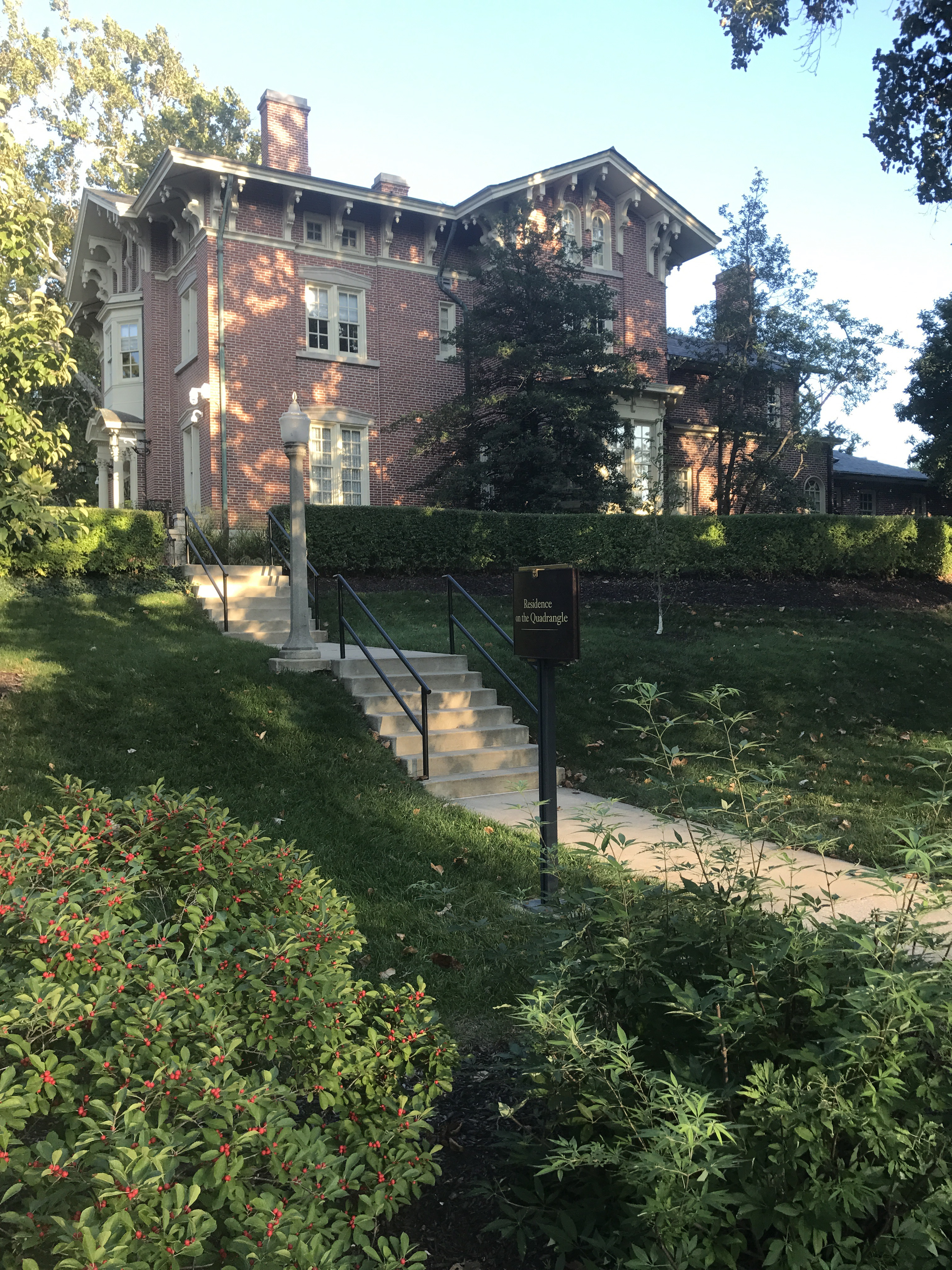
Residence on the Quad

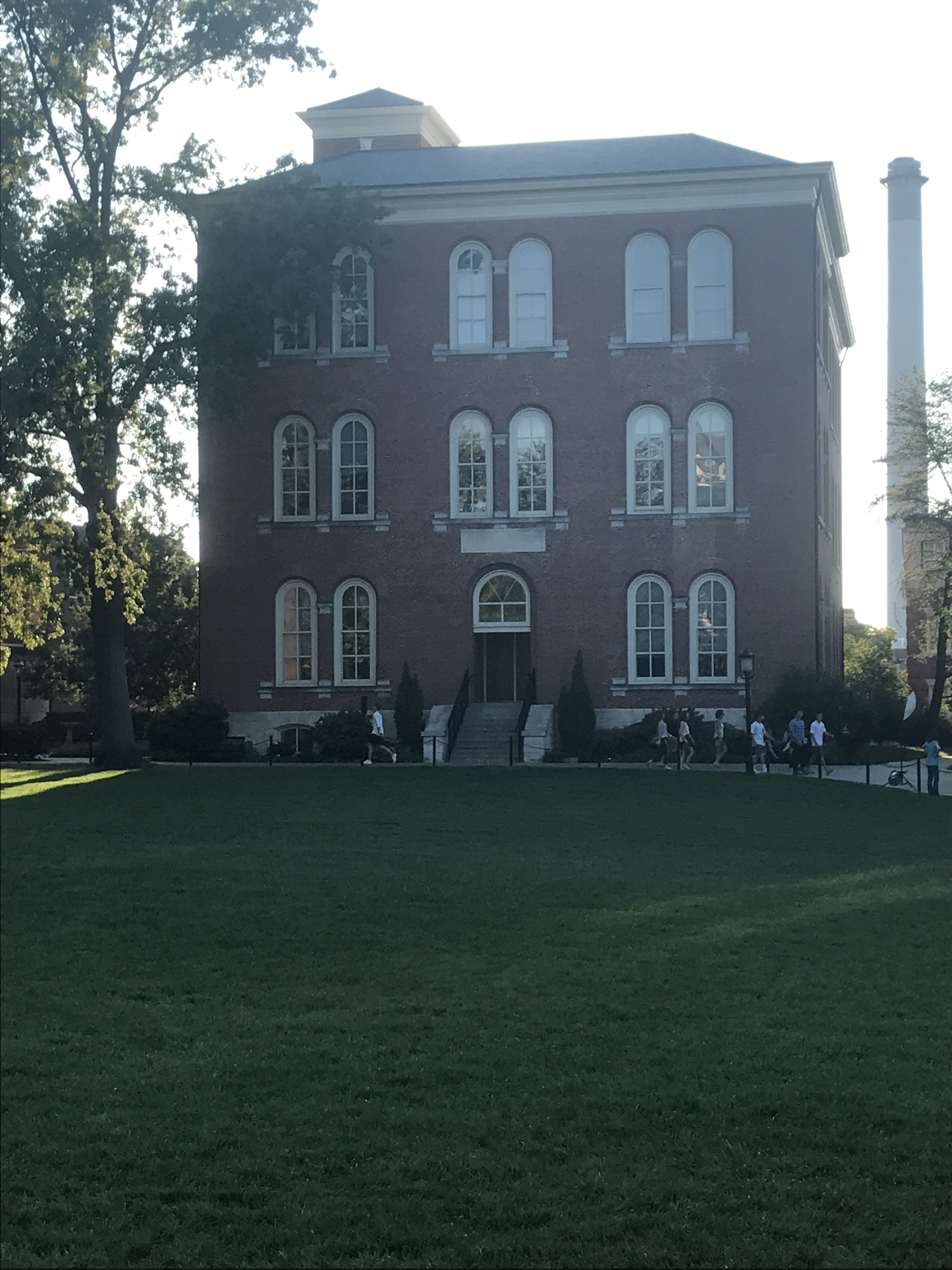
Switzler Hall

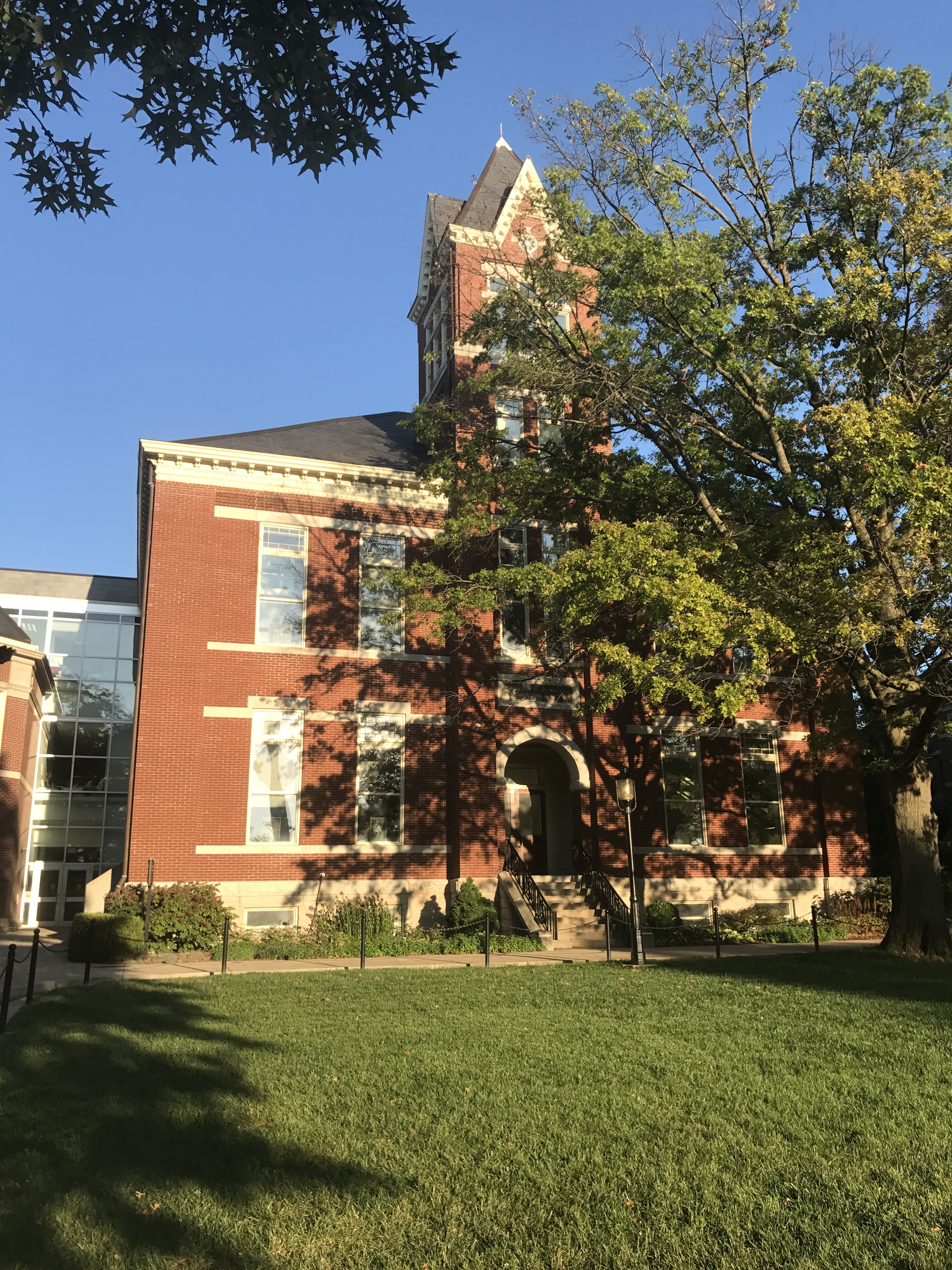
Reynolds Journalism Institute

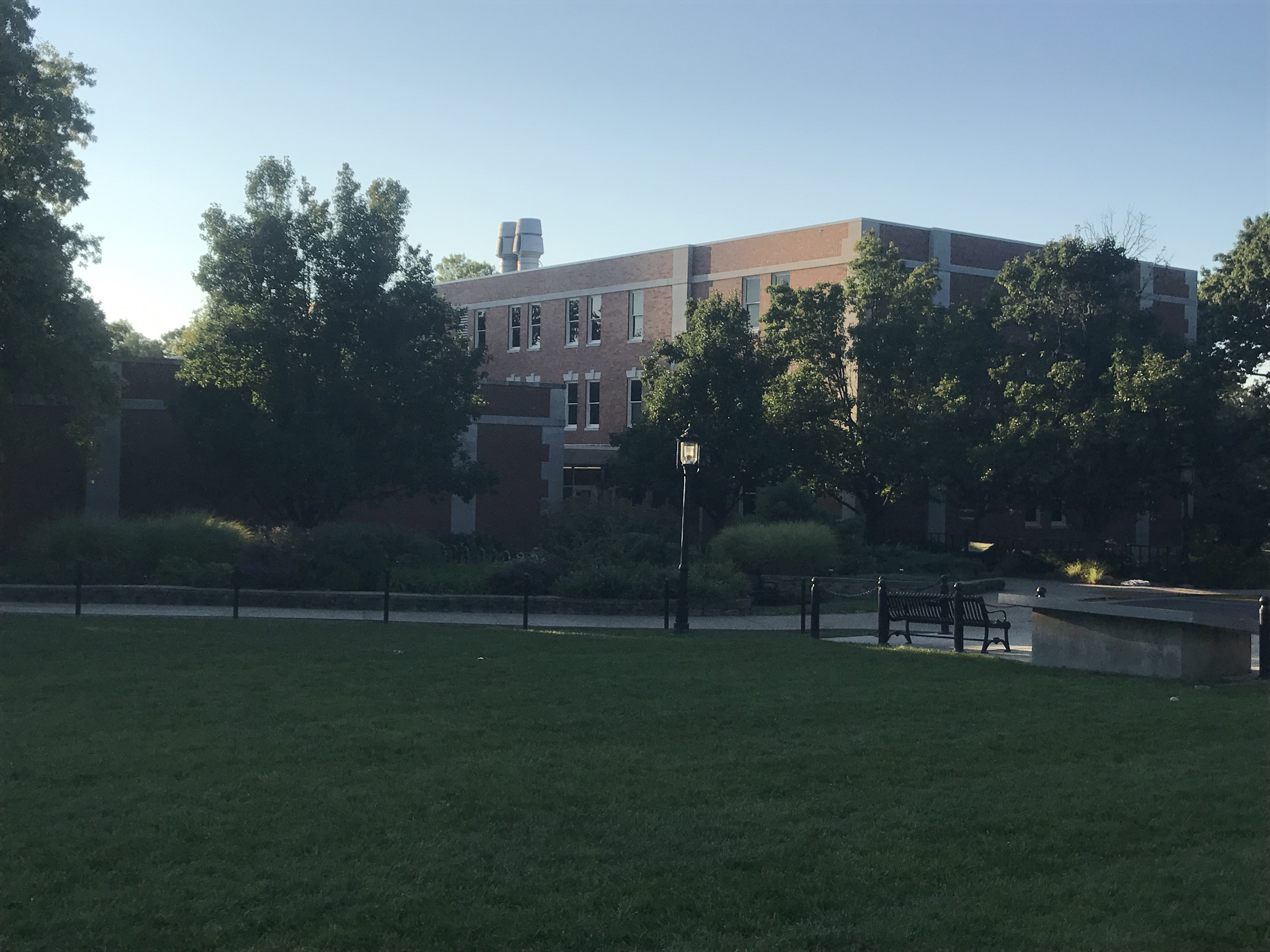
The Geology Building

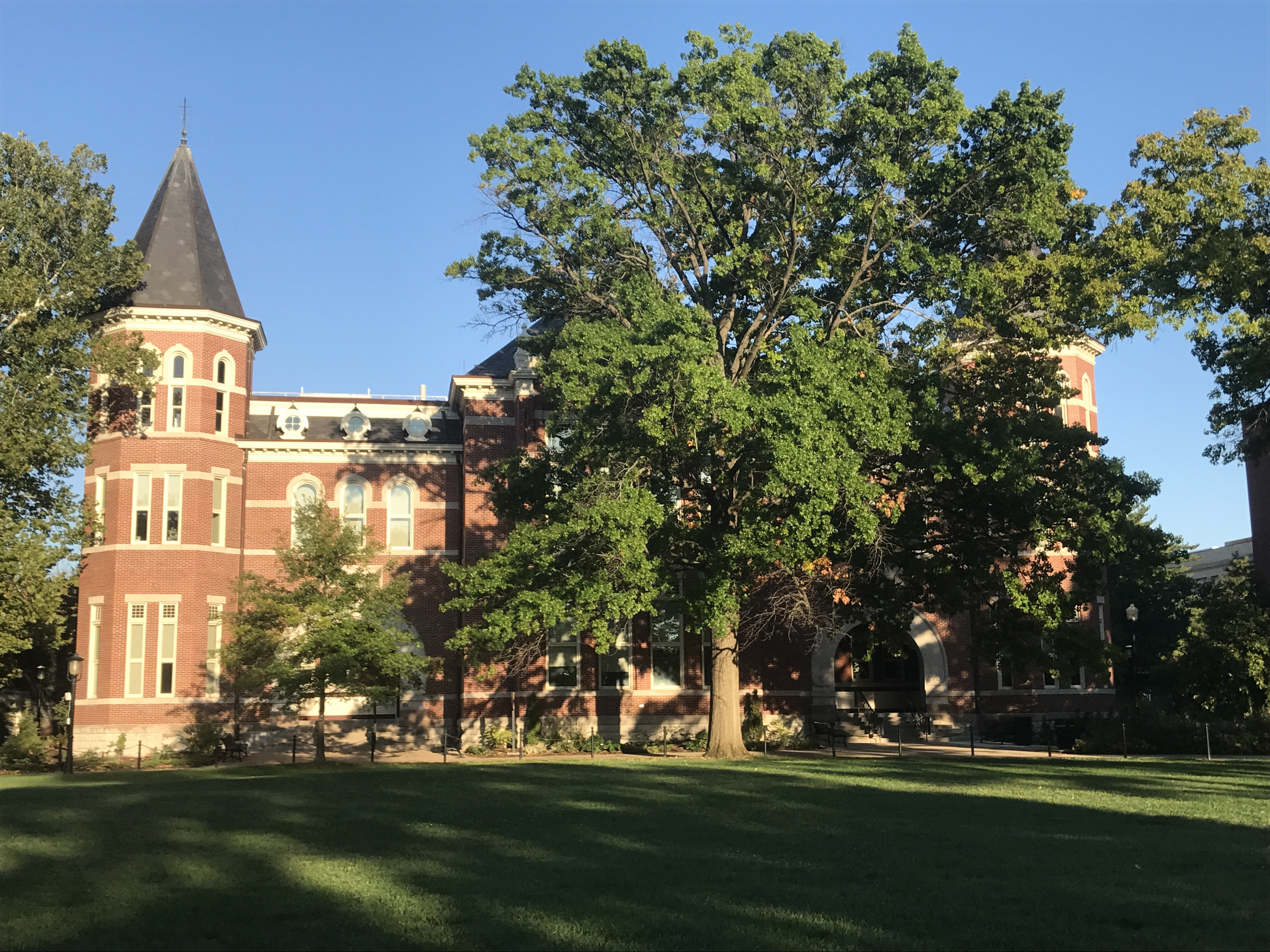
Swallow Hall in summer

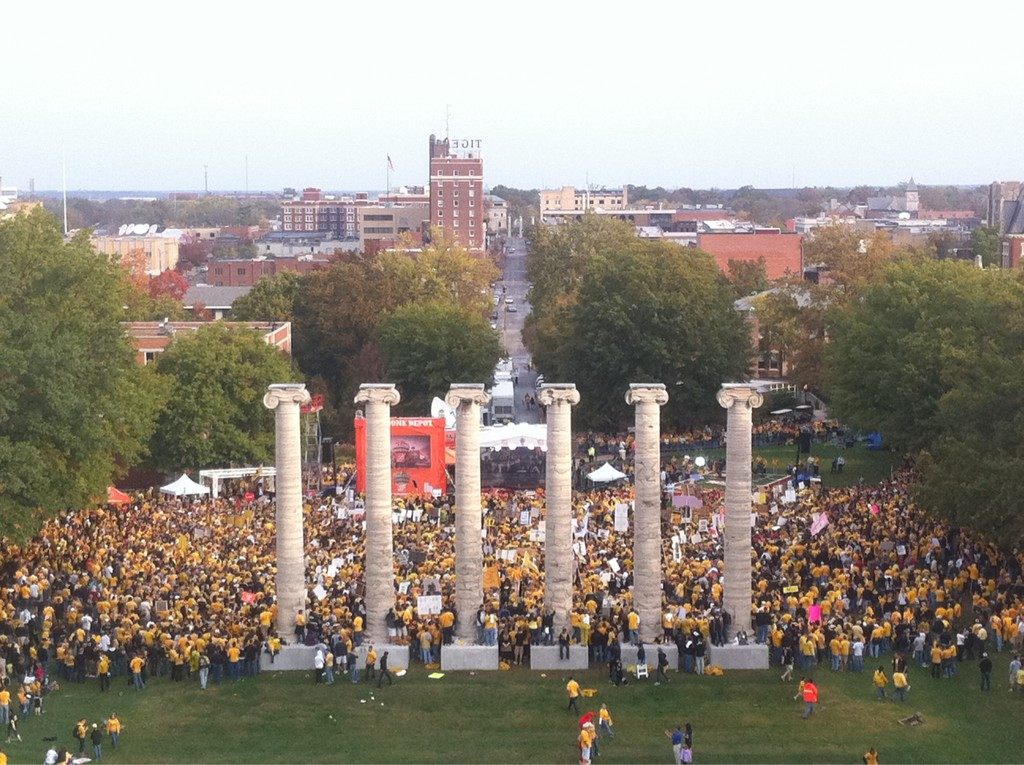
The quad hosting College GameDay in 2010

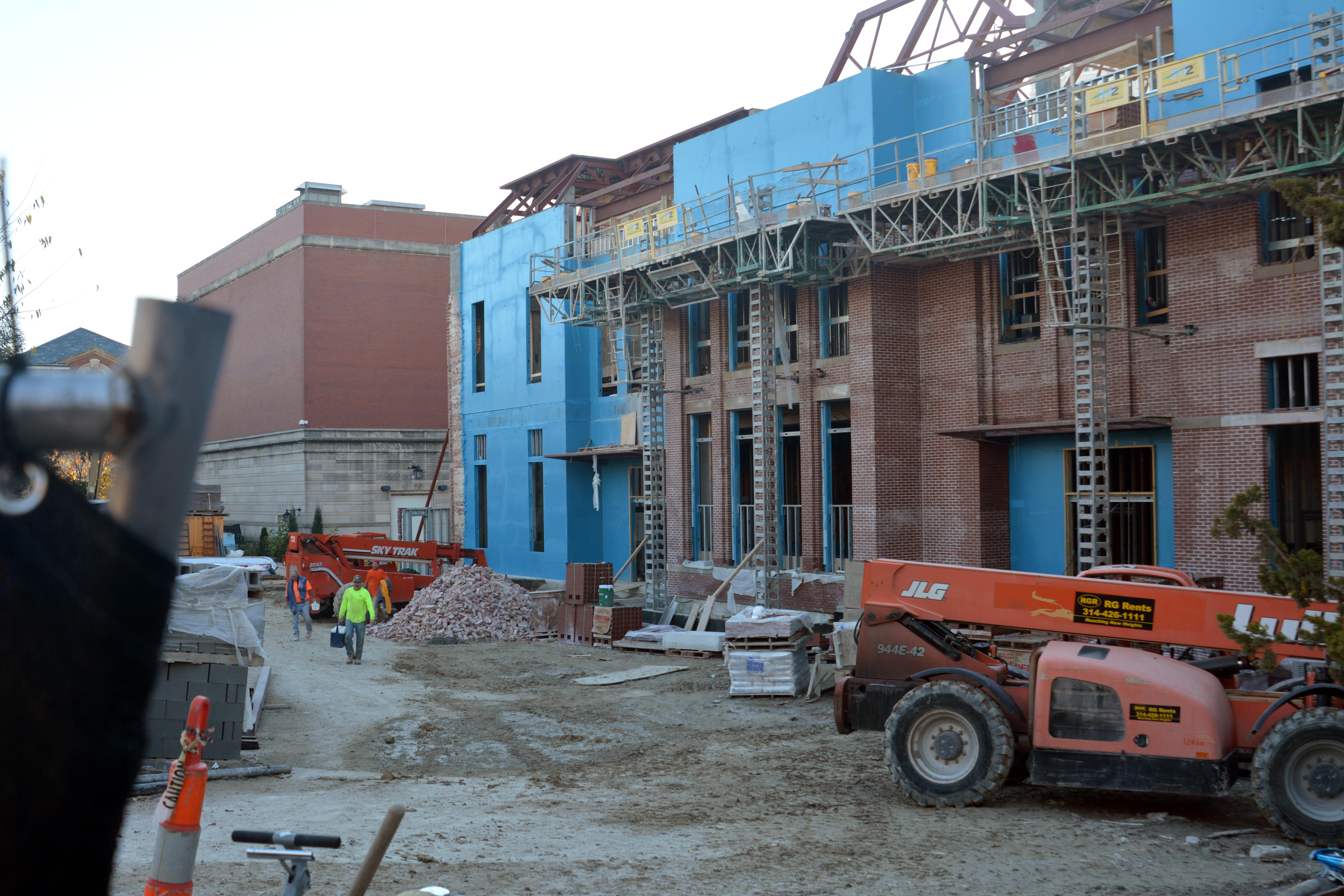
Swallow Hall undergoing construction in 2015

== See also ==
- History of the University of Missouri
