= Missouri Department of Elementary and Secondary Education =

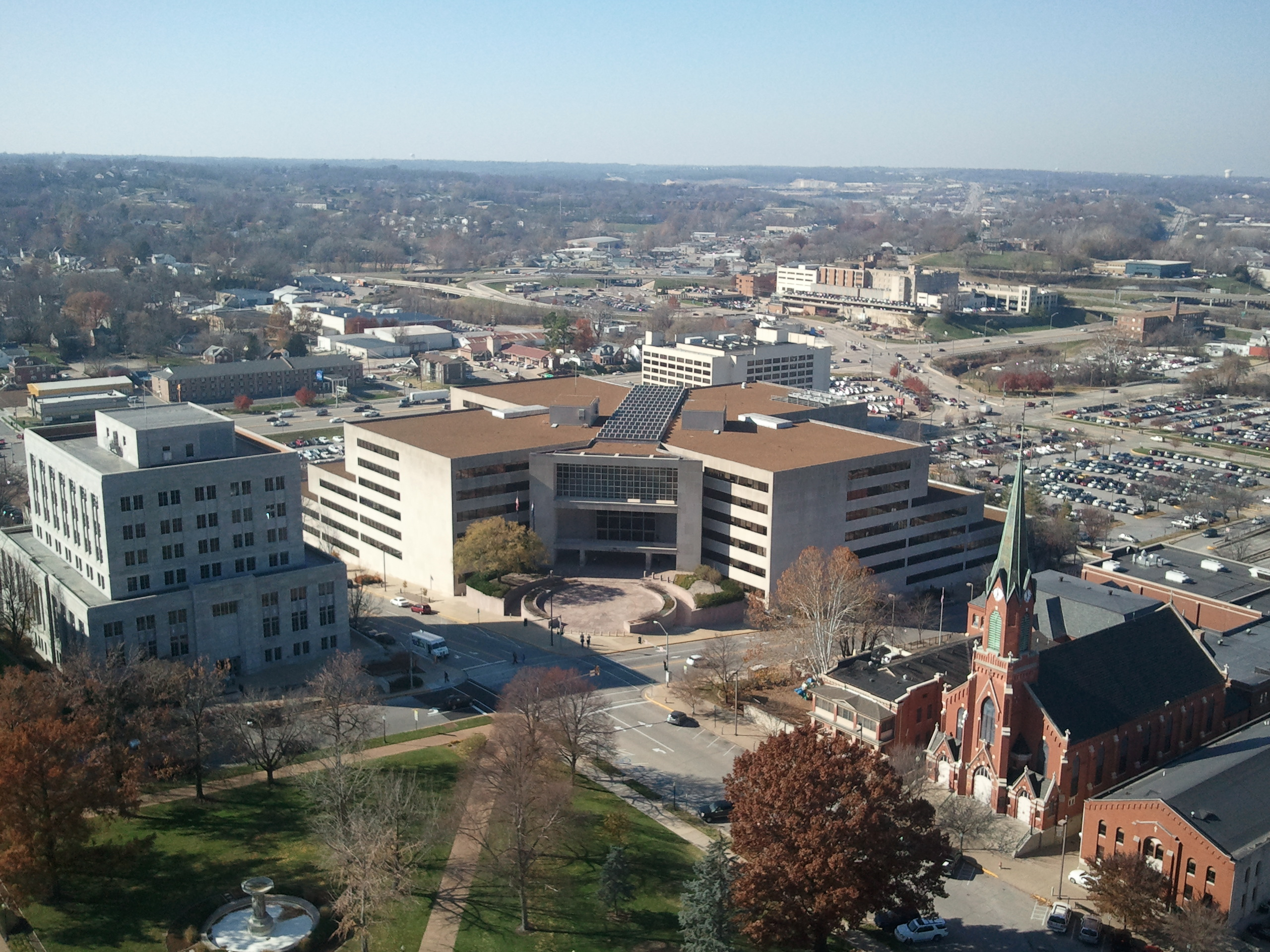
- The Department of Elementary in Jefferson City

State education agency overview
- Jurisdiction: Missouri
- Headquarters: 205 Jefferson Street, Jefferson City
- State education agency executives: Dr. Karla Eslinger, Commissioner of Education; Kyle Kruse, Deputy Commissioner; Kelli Jones, Deputy Commissioner
- Parent department: Missouri State Board of Education
- Child State education agency: Missouri State Legislature
- Website: dese.mo.gov

The Missouri Department of Elementary and Secondary Education (DESE) is the administrative arm of the Missouri State Board of Education that works with school officials, legislators, government agencies, community leaders, and citizens to maintain a strong public education system. Through its statewide school-improvement initiatives and its regulatory functions, the department strives to ensure all citizens have access to high-quality public education. In addition to the commissioner of education, the department organization reflects functions under two divisions; Financial and Administrative Services and Learning Services.

The department is headquartered in the Jefferson State Office Building in downtown Jefferson City, Missouri. It was reorganized and established in its present form by the Omnibus State Reorganization Act of 1974.

== Organization ==
- Commissioner
  - Chief Counsel
  - Communications
  - Governmental Relations
- Deputy Commissioner
  - Division of Learning Services
    - Office of Adult Learning and Rehabilitation Services
    - Office of Childhood
    - Office of College and Career Readiness
    - Office of Data System Management
    - Office of Educator Quality
    - Office of Quality Schools
    - Office of Special Education
  - Division of Financial and Administrative Services
    - Accounting & Procurement
    - Budget
    - Financial and Administrative Services
    - Food and Nutrition Services
    - Human Resource

== St. Louis Post-Dispatch database report ==
On October 14, 2021, the St. Louis Post-Dispatch reported that a flaw on a DESE website allowed the exposure of the Social Security numbers of over 100,000 DESE administrators, counselors, and teachers. The Post-Dispatch notified DESE of the security flaw and delayed the publication of its story "to give the department time to take steps to protect teachers’ private information, and to allow the state to ensure no other agencies’ web applications contained similar vulnerabilities".

In response, governor Mike Parson announced that the Missouri State Highway Patrol digital forensic unit would investigate "all of those involved", vowed to seek criminal prosecution of the "hacker" journalist who reported the story, and said his "administration is standing up against any and all perpetrators who attempt to steal personal information and harm Missourians". Parson claimed the reporter wanted to "embarrass the state and sell headlines for their news outlet", calling the reporting a "crime against Missouri teachers" and pledging to "hold accountable all those who aided this individual and the media corporation that employs them".

Parson's response was widely condemned by tech experts, who asserted that checking a web page's source code does not qualify as hacking and that prosecution would result in chilling effects that would prevent future security vulnerabilities from being reported. Parson was also criticized by a variety of local and national politicians, including Republican lawmaker Tony Lovasco and Democratic Senator Ron Wyden.
