= List of presidents of the University of Missouri System =

23 individuals had held the title of president since 1841 with one person holding the office at two different times. 8 additional persons had the power of a president for a limit period of time and were called acting president, interim president, or chairman of faculty.

Since the four-campus system was created in 1963, 11 individuals had held the title of president for the system with 4 additional persons as interim president.

The following persons had led the University of Missouri from 1841 until 1963 as president and later the University of Missouri System since 1963:

No.	Image	Name	Term start	Term end	Ref.
1		John Hiram Lathrop	1841	1849	
2		James Shannon	1850	1856	
3		William Wilson Hudson	1856	June 14, 1859 (Note: Died in office.)	
interim		George Matthews	1859	1860	
4		Benjamin Blake Minor	1860	1862	
University closed as a result of the Civil War from March 1862 until 1865
5		John Hiram Lathrop	1865	1866	
6		Daniel Read	1866	1876	
7		Samuel Spahr Laws	1876	1889	
interim (Note: Serving as Chairman of Faculty)		Michael Fisher	1889	1891	
interim		James Blackwell	1891	1891	
8		Richard Henry Jesse	1891	1908	
9		Albert Ross Hill	1908	1921	
10		John Carleton Jones	1922	1923	
acting		Isidor Loeb	1923	1923	
11		Stratton Brooks	1923	1930	
12		Walter Williams	1931	1935	
13		Frederick Middlebush	1935	1954	
14		Elmer Ellis (Note: Elmer Ellis had been president of the University of Missouri since 1954 and became president of the University of Missouri System upon its creation in 1963, while a new person was selected to become the first chancellor of the Columbia campus.)	1955	August 31, 1966	
15		John C. Weaver	September 1, 1966	October 27, 1970 (Note: Resigned to lead the University of Wisconsin.)	
interim		C. Brice Ratchford	October 27, 1970	June 24, 1971	
16		C. Brice Ratchford	June 24, 1971	May 21, 1976 (Note: Resigned under pressure.)	
acting (Note: Serving as "chief executive".)		A.G. Unklesbay (Note: Vice president of administration (given name is Athel Glyde))	May 21, 1976	May 31, 1976	
interim		James C. Olson	June 1, 1976	March 18, 1977	
17		James C. Olson	March 18, 1977	June 30, 1984	
interim		Mel George	July 1, 1984	December 31, 1984	
18		C. Peter Magrath	January 1, 1985	November 1991 (Note: Resigned to head the National Association of State Universities and Land-Grant Colleges.)	
19		George A. Russell	November 1991	August 31, 1996	
interim		Mel George	September 1, 1996	July 31, 1997	
20		Manuel T. Pacheco	August 1, 1997	December 31, 2002	
21		Elson Floyd	January 6, 2003	April 30, 2007 (Note: Resigned to head Washington State University.)	
interim		Gordon H. Lamb	May 1, 2007	February 17, 2008	
22		Gary D. Forsee	February 18, 2008	January 7, 2011 (Note: Resigned to care for his ailing wife.)	
interim		Steve Owens	January 7, 2011	February 14, 2012	
23		Timothy M. Wolfe	February 15, 2012	November 9, 2015 (Note: Forced to resign over several race-related incidents.)	
interim		Mike Middleton	November 12, 2015	February 28, 2017	
24		Mun Choi	March 1, 2017	present	

Table notes:

== See also ==
- List of chancellors of the University of Missouri (Columbia)
- List of chancellors of the Missouri University of Science and Technology (Rolla)
- List of chancellors of the University of Missouri–St. Louis
- List of chancellors of the University of Missouri–Kansas City
