= List of chancellors of the University of Missouri =

The following persons have led the Columbia campus of the University of Missouri:

Presidents of University of Missouri
| No. | Image | Name | Term start | Term end | Ref. |
|---|---|---|---|---|---|
| 1 | | John Hiram Lathrop | 1841 | 1849 | |
| 2 | | James Shannon | 1850 | 1856 | |
| 3 | | William Wilson Hudson | 1856 | June 14, 1859 (Note: Died in office.) | |
| interim | | George Matthews | 1859 | 1860 | |
| 4 | | Benjamin Blake Minor | 1860 | 1862 | |
University closed as a result of the Civil War from March 1862 until 1865
| 5 | | John Hiram Lathrop | 1865 | 1866 | |
| 6 | | Daniel Read | 1866 | 1876 | |
| 7 | | Samuel Spahr Laws | 1876 | 1889 | |
| interim (Note: Serving as Chairman of Faculty) | | Michael Fisher | 1889 | 1891 | |
| interim | | James Blackwell | 1891 | 1891 | |
| 8 | | Richard Henry Jesse | 1891 | 1908 | |
| 9 | | Albert Ross Hill | 1908 | 1921 | |
| 10 | | John Carleton Jones | 1922 | 1923 | |
| acting | | Isidor Loeb | 1923 | 1923 | |
| 11 | | Stratton Brooks | 1923 | 1930 | |
| 12 | | Walter Williams | 1931 | 1935 | |
| 13 | | Frederick Middlebush | 1935 | 1954 | |
| 14 | | Elmer Ellis (Note: Elmer Ellis had been president of the University of Missouri since 1954 and became president of the University of Missouri System upon its creation in 1963, while a new person was selected to become first chancellor of the Columbia campus.) | 1955 | July 31, 1964 | |

Since 1964, the following persons had served as chancellor of the Columbia campus:

Chancellors of University of Missouri–Columbia
| No. | Image | Name | Term start | Term end | Ref. |
|---|---|---|---|---|---|
| 15 | | John W. Schwada | August 1, 1964 | December 21, 1970 (Note: Resigned to head Arizona State University.) | |
| interim | | Herbert W. Schooling | December 21, 1970 | January 29, 1972 | |
| 16 | | Herbert W. Schooling | January 29, 1972 | July 16, 1978 | |
| 17 | | Barbara S. Uehling | July 17, 1978 | December 31, 1986 | |
| interim | | Duane Stucky | January 1, 1987 | June 30, 1987 | |
| 18 | | Haskell Monroe | July 1, 1987 | December 31, 1991 (Note: Resigned under pressure.) | |
| interim | | Gerald T. Brouder | January 1, 1992 | October 30, 1992 | |
| 19 | | Charles Kiesler | November 1, 1992 | July 18, 1996 (Note: Fired by the Board of Curators.) | |
| interim | | Richard L. Wallace | July 18, 1996 | November 14, 1997 | |
| 20 | | Richard L. Wallace | November 14, 1997 | August 31, 2004 | |
| interim | | Brady J. Deaton | September 1, 2004 | October 4, 2004 | |
| 21 | | Brady J. Deaton | October 4, 2004 | November 14, 2013 | |
| interim | | Steve Owens | November 15, 2013 | January 31, 2014 | |
| 22 | | R. Bowen Loftin | February 1, 2014. | November 11, 2015 (Note: Forced to resign over several race-related incidents.) | |
| interim | | Hank Foley | November 11, 2015 | May 3, 2017 (Note: Resigned to head the New York Institute of Technology.) | |
| interim | | Garnett S. Stokes | May 3, 2017 | July 31, 2017 | |
| 23 | | Alexander N. Cartwright | August 1, 2017 | May 25, 2020 (Note: Resigned to head the University of Central Florida.) | |
| interim | | Mun Choi (Note: Serving concurrently as System president.) | May 26, 2020 | July 28, 2020 | |
| 24 | | Mun Choi | July 28, 2020 | Present | |

Table notes:

== See also ==
- List of presidents of the University of Missouri System
- List of chancellors of the Missouri University of Science and Technology (Rolla)
- List of chancellors of the University of Missouri–St. Louis
- List of chancellors of the University of Missouri–Kansas City
