= Mun Choi =

Korean-American university chancellor

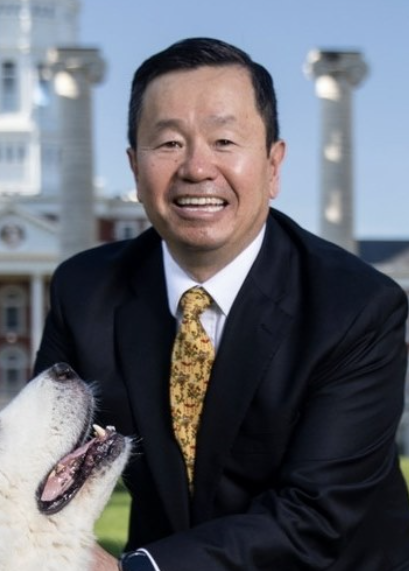
- Choi in 2020

11th President of the University of Missouri System
- Incumbent
- Assumed office March 1, 2017
- Preceded by: Tim Wolfe

10th Chancellor of the University of Missouri
- Incumbent
- Assumed office March 25, 2020; Acting: March 25, 2020 – July 28, 2020
- Preceded by: Alexander Cartwright

Personal details
- Born: Choi Mun Young; March 19, 1964 (age 62) Seoul, South Korea
- Children: 3
- Education: University of Illinois, Urbana-Champaign (BS); Princeton University (MS, PhD)
- Scientific career
- Fields: Mechanical & Aerospace Engineering
- Workplaces: University of Illinois Chicago; Drexel University; University of Connecticut; University of Missouri
- Thesis: Droplet combustion characteristics under microgravity and normal-gravity conditions (1992)
- Doctoral advisor: Frederick L. Dryer

Korean name
- Hangul: 최문영
- Hanja: 崔門永
- RR: Choe Munyeong
- MR: Ch'oe Munyŏng

Mun Young Choi (Korean: 최문영; born March 19, 1964) is an American academic. He currently serves as Chancellor of the University of Missouri and President of the University of Missouri System. Prior to his appointment at Missouri he was Provost & Executive Vice President at the University of Connecticut. He has also taught at Drexel University and the University of Illinois at Chicago.

== Early life and education ==
Choi was born in Seoul, South Korea. Choi immigrated to the United States in 1973, settling in Akron, Ohio with his parents and three younger sisters at the age of nine. He attended Leggett Primary School in Akron, Ohio, and Trumbull Primary School in the Andersonville neighborhood and Boone Middle School in the West Rogers Park neighborhood of Chicago. He graduated from Stephen Tyng Mather High School in Chicago in 1983. He earned a BS degree (1987) in General Engineering from the University of Illinois at Urbana–Champaign and M.A. (1989) and Ph.D. (1992) degrees in Mechanical & Aerospace Engineering from Princeton University.

== University of Missouri ==
On March 1, 2017, Choi became president of the four-campus University of Missouri System. On March 25, 2020, Choi agreed to serve as interim Chancellor of the University of Missouri flagship campus in Columbia (MU). This position was made permanent on July 28, making Choi the first to be both Chancellor of the University of Missouri in Columbia and President of the University of Missouri System simultaneously.

In the spring of 2020, students at MU petitioned Choi to remove a bronze statue of Thomas Jefferson, purchased and installed by MU alumni in 2001, from the University of Missouri's Francis Quadrangle. Choi instead proposed it be "recontextualized" with input from a task force. Choi subsequently rebuked reporters (who are also on the MU journalism faculty) for making what he called "inappropriate" social-media comments about Choi's refusal to remove the statue and characterized the comments as attempts to undermine the university.

In July 2020, Choi and MU's provost fired the College of Education's dean, and when faced with criticism from some faculty, Choi reportedly demanded administrative support for this decision. This removal and its aftermath, along with his response regarding the Jefferson statue, has led to the criticism that Choi brooks no dissent.

During the fall of 2020, some MU students said that Choi blocked them on Twitter after they expressed COVID-related health and safety concerns about conditions on campus. Examples of concerns relate to COVID-19 testing protocols and lack of running water in some campus bathrooms. MU alumnus Christopher Bennett threatened legal action on First Amendment grounds over Choi's blocking of student accounts. MU justified Choi's actions by stating that he "has been on the receiving end of messages/tweets that were disrespectful and not constructive [and] some contained profanity."

In April 2026, Mun Choi approved the decision to cut funding for MU’s multicultural umbrella organizations. Choi cited the need to protect the university from potential federal penalties, specifically referencing the February 2025 federal directive threatening to cut funding to schools maintaining diversity, equity, and inclusion (DEI) programs, despite the fact that MU dissolved its Division of Inclusion, Diversity, and Equity (IDE) in August 2024. The five umbrella student groups disendowed include the Legion of Black Collegians, Association of Latin American Students, Asian American Association, Queer Liberation Front, and Four Front. Choi reclassified the groups from Sponsored Student Organizations, which receive funding through direct allocations from MU's Student Activity Fee, to Registered Student Organizations, which must request funding from the university's Organization Resource Group with a single event cap of $1,500 and a yearly cap of $3,000.

Under Choi's leadership, the UM System completed the Roy Blunt NextGen Precision Health building on MU's campus in October 2021. The opening was attended by Sen. Blunt and then NIH Director Francis Collins. The facility received bipartisan support. Shortly after the opening of NextGen, Choi announced MizzouForward – a $1.5 billion, ten-year initiative to invest in research on campus and hire at least 150 new faculty members.

The University of Missouri System has a $6.5 billion economic impact on Missouri's economy, an increase of about $1.1 billion from a similar report in 2018.

A faculty survey of Choi conducted in May 2022 found his performance "unsatisfactory", with the majority believing that Choi should not retain his position.

Research expenditures at the University of Missouri rose to a record $432 million in 2022 and $462 million in 2023.

In 2023, Choi was named to the Southeastern Conference Executive Committee for 2023–2024. He will serve as vice president in 2025. He is also chair of the Association of Public and Land-Grant Universities’ Commission on Food, Environment, and Renewable Resources.

Also in 2023, a survey showed that Missourians by wide margin think the state is better off with Mizzou here. For the fall 2023 semester, University of Missouri first-year student enrollment grew 3% and first-year retention reached an all-time high of 91%.

Mizzou was included in TIME Magazine's 2024 list of Best Colleges for Future Leaders. Student outcome rates also rose to 95.4%. Choi credited the increase with preparation students receive at MU. State funding for the University of Missouri increased 7% for 2024.

Mizzou faculty opinion of Choi vastly improved in 2024. The survey from May 2022 was conducted and the faculty's average scores from the 2024 report improved across all survey categories. In all but 4 of the 19 areas, most rankings by faculty of Choi were a 5, or outstanding.

An article published in The Chronicle of Higher Education highlighted how President Choi has regained campus confidence.

== See also ==
- History of the University of Missouri
- Elmer Ellis, the only other person to lead both the University of Missouri and the University of Missouri System (not at the same time)

Academic offices
Preceded by Tim Wolfe	11th President of the University of Missouri System; 2017–present	Incumbent
Preceded by Alexander Cartwright	10th Chancellor of the University of Missouri; 2020–present	Incumbent
