= List of chancellors of the University of Missouri–Kansas City =

== Chancellors of the University of Missouri–Kansas City ==
During the early twentieth century, several smaller Kansas City-area private colleges and universities were formed and later merge together to form what eventually became the University of Missouri–Kansas City.

The most significant predecessor institution was the privately owned University of Kansas City (1933–1963). During a 30 year period, 6 individuals led this institution as president, with one using the title Executive Secretary, plus an additional person serving solely on an interim basis.

When the University of Kansas City became a part of the University of Missouri system as the University of Missouri at Kansas City on July 1, 1963, the leaders of the campus became chancellors.

Presidents (when the school was independent)/Chancellors (when the school became part of the University of Missouri system) of the school are:

No.	Image	Name	Term start	Term end	Ref.
Executive Secretary of the University of Kansas City (1933–1936)
1		Ernest H. Newcomb	1933	1936	
Presidents of the University of Kansas City (1936–1963)
2		John Duncan Spaeth	1936	1938	
3		Clarence Decker	1938	1953	
interim		Roy Rinehart	1953	1953	
4		Earl J. McGrath	1953	1956	
interim		Richard M. Drake	July 1, 1956	September 30, 1957	
5		Richard M. Drake	September 30, 1957	August 31, 1961	
interim		Carleton F. Scofield	June 12, 1961	February 25, 1963	
6a		Carleton F. Scofield	February 25, 1963	June 30, 1963 (Note: Scofield continued to lead the campus on as the chancellor of UMKC.)	
Chancellors of the University of Missouri-Kansas City (1963–present)
6b		Carleton F. Scofield	July 1, 1963 (Note: Scofield was previously the last leader of a private University of Kansas City.)	July 16, 1965	
7		Randall M. Whaley	July 17, 1965	September 6, 1967	
interim		Hamilton B.G. Robinson	September 6, 1967	July 31, 1968	
8		James C. Olson (Note: Resigned to head University of Missouri system.)	August 1, 1968	June 30, 1976	
interim		Wesley J. Dale	July 1, 1976	October 16, 1977	
9		George A. Russell	October 17, 1977	October 31, 1992 (Note: Resigned to head the University of Missouri system.)	
interim		Eleanor Schwartz	September 16, 1991	May 15, 1992	
10		Eleanor Schwartz	May 15, 1992	January 31, 1999	
interim		Gordon Lamb	February 1, 1999	March 31, 2000	
11		Martha Gilliland	April 1, 2000	December 31, 2005	
interim		Elson Floyd (Note: Interim leader through his position as system president.)	January 1, 2005	April 30, 2005	
interim		Steven Lehmkuhle	May 1, 2005	December 31, 2005	
12		Guy Bailey	January 1, 2006	July 31, 2008 (Note: Resigned to head Texas Tech University.)	
interim		Leo Morton	August 1, 2008	December 15, 2008	
13		Leo Morton	December 15, 2008	October 2017	
interim		Barbara A. Bichelmeyer	August 15, 2017	June 19, 2018	
14		C. Mauli Agrawal	June 20, 2018	present	

Table notes:

== See also ==
- List of presidents of the University of Missouri System
- List of chancellors of the University of Missouri (Columbia)
- List of chancellors of the Missouri University of Science and Technology (Rolla)
- List of chancellors of the University of Missouri–St. Louis
