= List of chancellors of the Missouri University of Science and Technology =

The naming structure for the head of the Missouri University of Science and Technology has changed reflecting its changes through the years. The head currently reports to the University of Missouri System.

The chancellor lives on campus at the Chancellor's Residence. It was constructed in 1889 as the "Club House" dormitory, then converted to a room house before becoming the Missouri State Geological Survey headquarters and finally the residence for the then-director in 1905.

Mohammad Dehghani of Stevens Institute of Technology began his service as chancellor in 2019. Dehghani had previously held leadership positions at the Lawrence Livermore National Laboratory, the Applied Physics Laboratory, and the Johns Hopkins University Systems Institute, at which he was a founding director.

== Chancellors of the Missouri University of Science and Technology ==
The following individuals have led the Missouri University of Science and Technology, or its predecessors since 1870:

No.	Image	Name	Term start	Term end	Ref.
Directors of the University of Missouri School of Mines and Metallurgy (1870–1941)
1		Charles Penrose Williams	1871	1877	
2		Charles Edmund Wait	1877	1888	
3		William Holding Echols	1888	1891	
4		Elmo Golightly Harris	1891	1893	
5		Walter Buck Richards	1893	1897	
6		George E. Ladd	1897	1907	
7		Lewis Emmanuel Young	1907	1913	
acting		Leon Ellis Garrett	1913	1915	
8		Durward Copeland	1915	1915 (Note: Resigned after dispute with university president.)	
9		Austin Lee McRae	1915	June 30, 1920	
10		Charles Herman Fulton	July 1, 1920	August 31, 1937	
11		William Reuel Chedsey	September 1, 1937	July 31, 1941	
Deans of the University of Missouri School of Mines and Metallurgy (1941–1964)
12		Curtis L. Wilson	August 1, 1941	August 31, 1963	
13a		Merl Baker	September 1, 1963	June 30, 1964 (Note: Date when the University of Missouri School of Mines and Metallurgy was officially dissolved as a remote unit of the Columbia campus.)	
Chancellors of the University of Missouri at Rolla (1964–1968)
13b		Merl Baker	July 1, 1964 (Note: Date when the University of Missouri at Rolla was officially formed as a part of the University of Missouri system.)	October 18, 1973 (Note: Resigned as result of an unspecified illness.)	
Chancellors of the University of Missouri–Rolla (1968–2008)
acting		Dudley Thompson	October 18, 1973	September 30, 1974	
14		Raymond L. Bisplinghoff	October 1, 1974	December 31, 1976	
interim		Jim C. Pogue	January 1, 1977	Summer 1978	
15		Joseph M. Marchello	Summer 1978	August 1985 (Note: Resigned to head Old Dominion University.)	
interim		John T. Park	August 1985	April 27, 1986	
17		Martin C. Jischke	April 28, 1986	May 31, 1991 (Note: Resigned to head Iowa State University.)	
interim		John T. Park	June 1, 1991	March 20, 1992	
18		John T. Park	March 20, 1992	August 31, 2000	
19		Gary Thomas	September 1, 2000	August 31, 2005	
20		John F. Carney III	September 1, 2005	August 31, 2011	
Chancellors of the Missouri University of Science and Technology (2008–present)
interim		Warren K. Wray	September 1, 2011	March 31, 2012	
21		Cheryl B. Schrader	April 2, 2012	May 14, 2017 (Note: Resigned to head Wright State University)	
interim		Christopher G. Maples	May 15, 2017	July 31, 2019	
22		Mohammad Dehghani	August 1, 2019	present	

Table notes:

== See also ==
- List of presidents of the University of Missouri System
- List of chancellors of the University of Missouri (Columbia)
- List of chancellors of the University of Missouri–St. Louis
- List of chancellors of the University of Missouri–Kansas City
