= C. Peter Magrath =

Higher education administrator

- Magrath in 1969

3rd and 6th President of Binghamton University
- Acting; July 1, 2010 – December 31, 2011
- Preceded by: Lois B. DeFleur
- Succeeded by: Harvey G. Stenger
- In office 1972–1974
- Preceded by: George Bruce Dearing
- Succeeded by: Clifford D. Clark

President of West Virginia University
- Acting; July 8, 2008 – June 29, 2009
- Preceded by: Michael Garrison
- Succeeded by: James P. Clements

18th President of the University of Missouri System
- In office 1985–1991
- Preceded by: Mel George
- Succeeded by: George A. Russell

11th President of the University of Minnesota
- In office 1974–1984
- Preceded by: Malcolm Moos
- Succeeded by: Kenneth H. Keller

Chancellor of the University of Nebraska–Lincoln
- Acting; July 1, 1971 – December 31, 1971
- Preceded by: Joseph Soshnik (Note: As President of the University of Nebraska–Lincoln)
- Succeeded by: James Zumberge

Personal details
- Born: Claude Peter Magrath; April 23, 1933 (age 93) New York City, U.S.
- Profession: University administrator

Claude Peter Magrath (/məˈɡrɔː/, born April 23, 1933) is a higher education administrator who has served as provost or president at multiple American universities.

Magrath was born on April 23, 1933, in Brooklyn, New York and received political science degrees as an undergraduate at the University of New Hampshire and as a Ph.D. at Cornell University. He began his teaching and administrative career at Brown University during 1961–68 and later served as interim chancellor of the University of Nebraska–Lincoln (where he was provost and held other positions, 1968–72).

His first full-time university presidency was at Binghamton University (then known as SUNY Binghamton) from 1972–74. He was the eleventh president of the University of Minnesota, serving from 1974 to 1984. From 1985 to 1991 he was president of the University of Missouri System. From 1992 to 2005 he was president of the National Association of State Universities and Land Grant Colleges. Beginning in 2006, he served as senior advisor to the College Board. On July 8, 2008, he was named interim president of West Virginia University.

On January 2, 2010, while vacationing in New Zealand, his wife Deborah Howell, an editor for The Washington Post, died after being hit by a motorist.

On May 20, 2010, State University of New York (SUNY) Chancellor Nancy Zimpher nominated Magrath to return as interim president to Binghamton University. He assumed the office on July 1 after confirmation by the SUNY Board of Trustees.

== See also ==
- List of presidents of the University of Minnesota
- List of presidents of West Virginia University

== Notes ==
Academic offices
Preceded by Bruce Dearing	President of Binghamton University; 1972–1974	Succeeded by Clifford D. Clark
Preceded by Malcolm Moos	President of the University of Minnesota; 1974–1984	Succeeded by Kenneth H. Keller
Preceded by James C. Olson	President of the University of Missouri System; 1985–1991	Succeeded by George A. Russell
Preceded by Michael Garrison	President of West Virginia University; 2008–2010	Succeeded by James P. Clements
Preceded by Lois B. DeFleur	President of Binghamton University; 2010–2012	Succeeded by Harvey G. Stenger, Jr.
