= Columbia Cemetery (Columbia, Missouri) =

Historic cemetery in Boone County, Missouri

- U.S. National Register of Historic Places
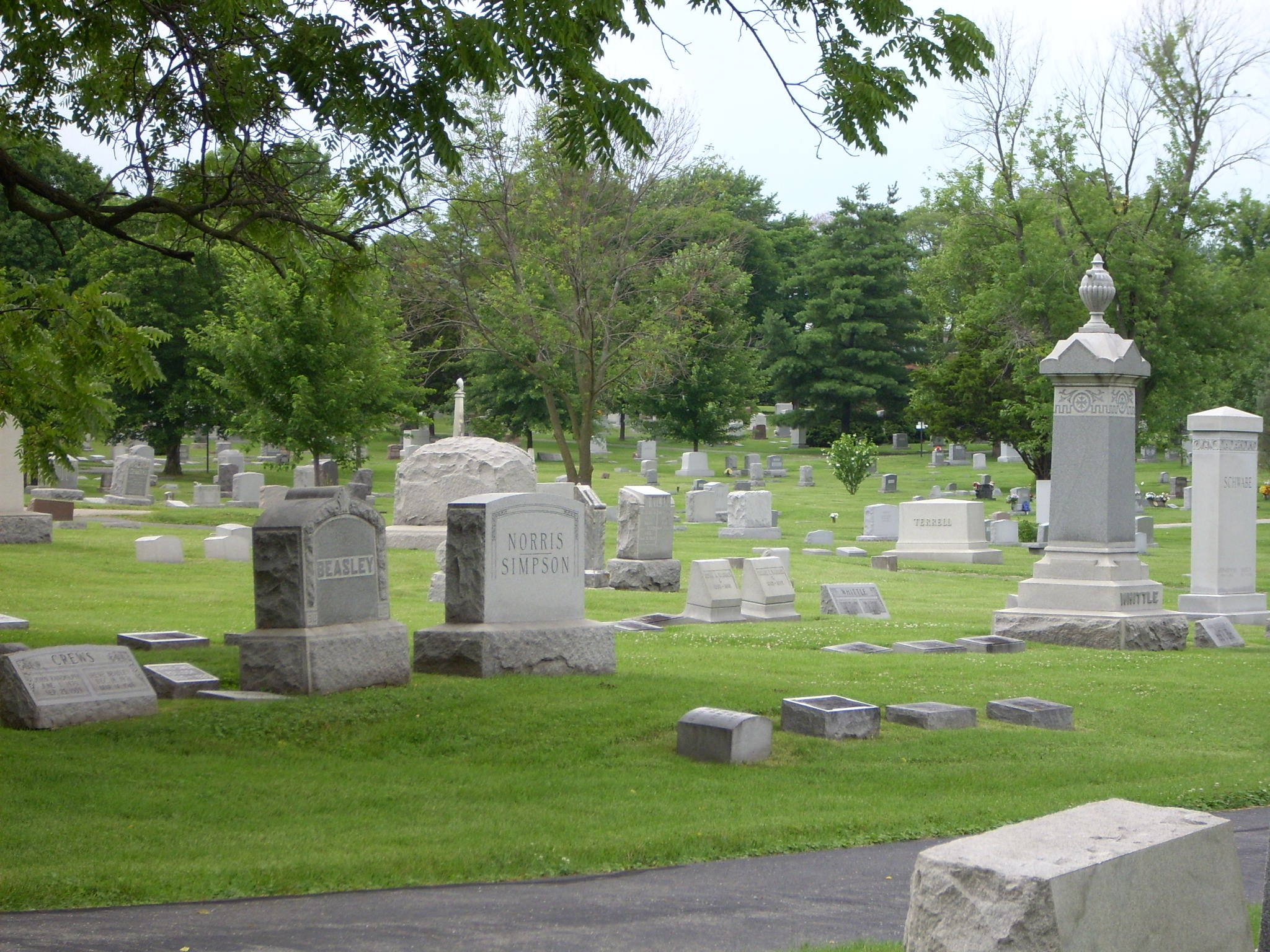

- Location within Missouri Location within the United States
- Location: 30 East Broadway, Columbia, Missouri
- Coordinates: 38°56′57″N 92°20′14″W
- Area: 26 acres (11 ha)
- Built: 1820
- Architect: Major, Horace F.,
- Architectural style: Romanesque, rural cemetery
- NRHP reference No.: 06001335
- Added to NRHP: February 1, 2007

The Columbia Cemetery in Columbia, Missouri has been in use as a cemetery since 1820. The cemetery historically contains, White, African-American, and Jewish (Beth Olem Cemetery, Beth Shalom Cemetery) sections. Located in the cemetery are a vernacular stone receiving vault (1887), and a Romanesque Revival style mausoleum (1911).

Located on Broadway just west of Downtown Columbia, the cemetery contains many burials of prominent people associated with Missouri history, the University of Missouri, or the city of Columbia. It was listed on the National Register of Historic Places in 2007. It is still an operating cemetery with room for many more burials and celebrated its 200th anniversary in 2020.

== Notable interments ==
- Philemon Bliss – politician, Missouri Chief justice, educator
- John William "Blind" Boone – musician, pianist
- Fred Morris Dearing – diplomat
- William Wilson Elwang – preacher and author
- Jane Froman – actress and singer
- North Todd Gentry – Missouri Attorney General, historian
- Odon Guitar – soldier
- Albert Ross Hill – politician, university president
- William Wilson Hudson – Third president of the University of Missouri
- Richard Henry Jesse – Eighth president of the University of Missouri
- John Carleton Jones – Tenth president of the University of Missouri
- John Hiram Lathrop – First president of the University of Missouri
- Frederick Middlebush – Thirteenth president of the University of Missouri
- William Lester Nelson – politician
- James S. Rollins – politician and lawyer
- Max Schwabe – politician
- James Shannon – academic
- Willard Duncan Vandiver – politician
- Edwin Moss Watson – newspaper editor
- Abraham J. Williams – Third Governor of the State of Missouri
- Walter Williams – founder of the Missouri School of Journalism and twelfth president of the University of Missouri
- Edwin William Stephens – publisher, civic leader
- William Franklin Switzler – historian, journalist

== Gallery ==
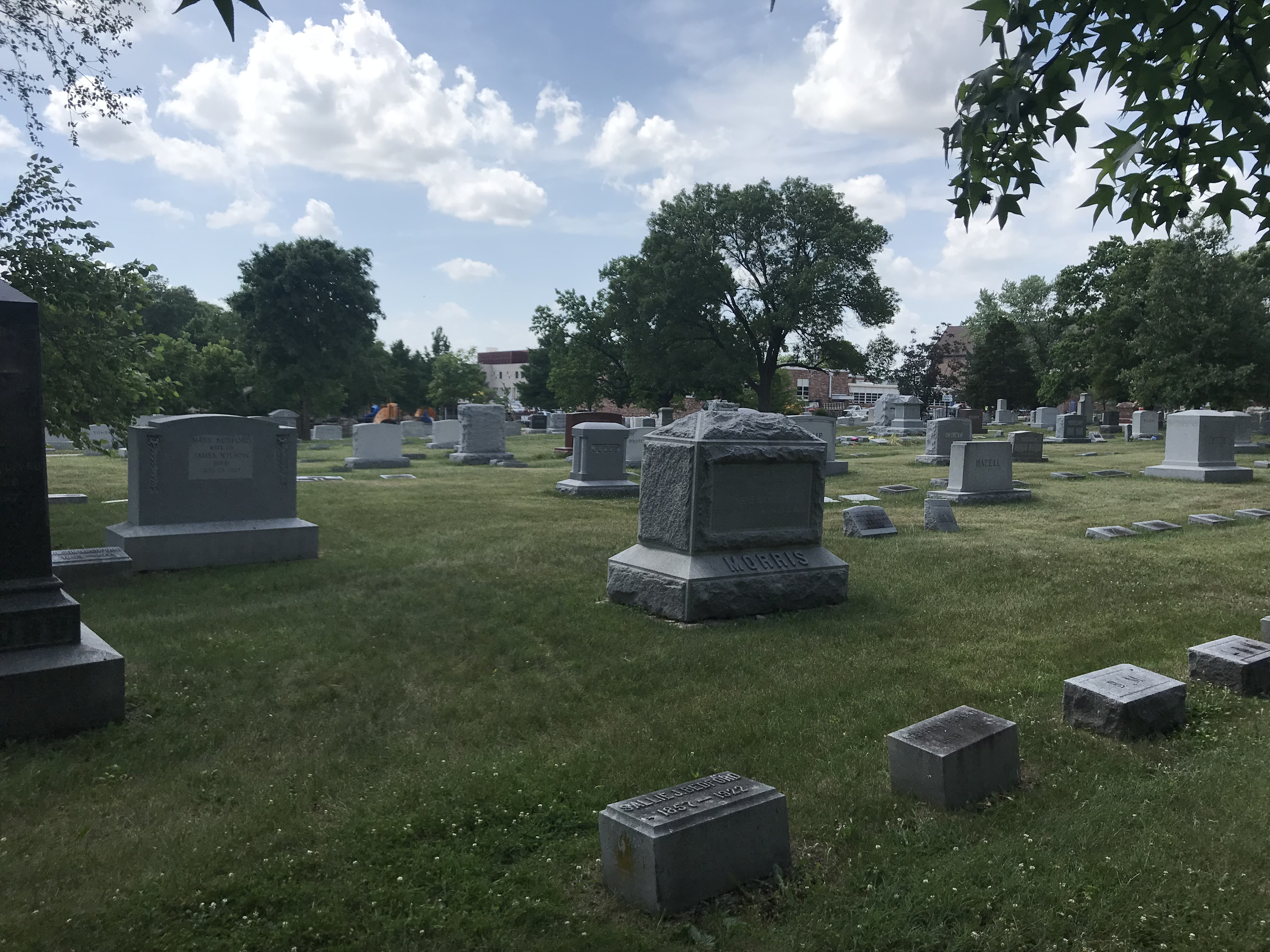
Elmwood Cemetery founded in 1914

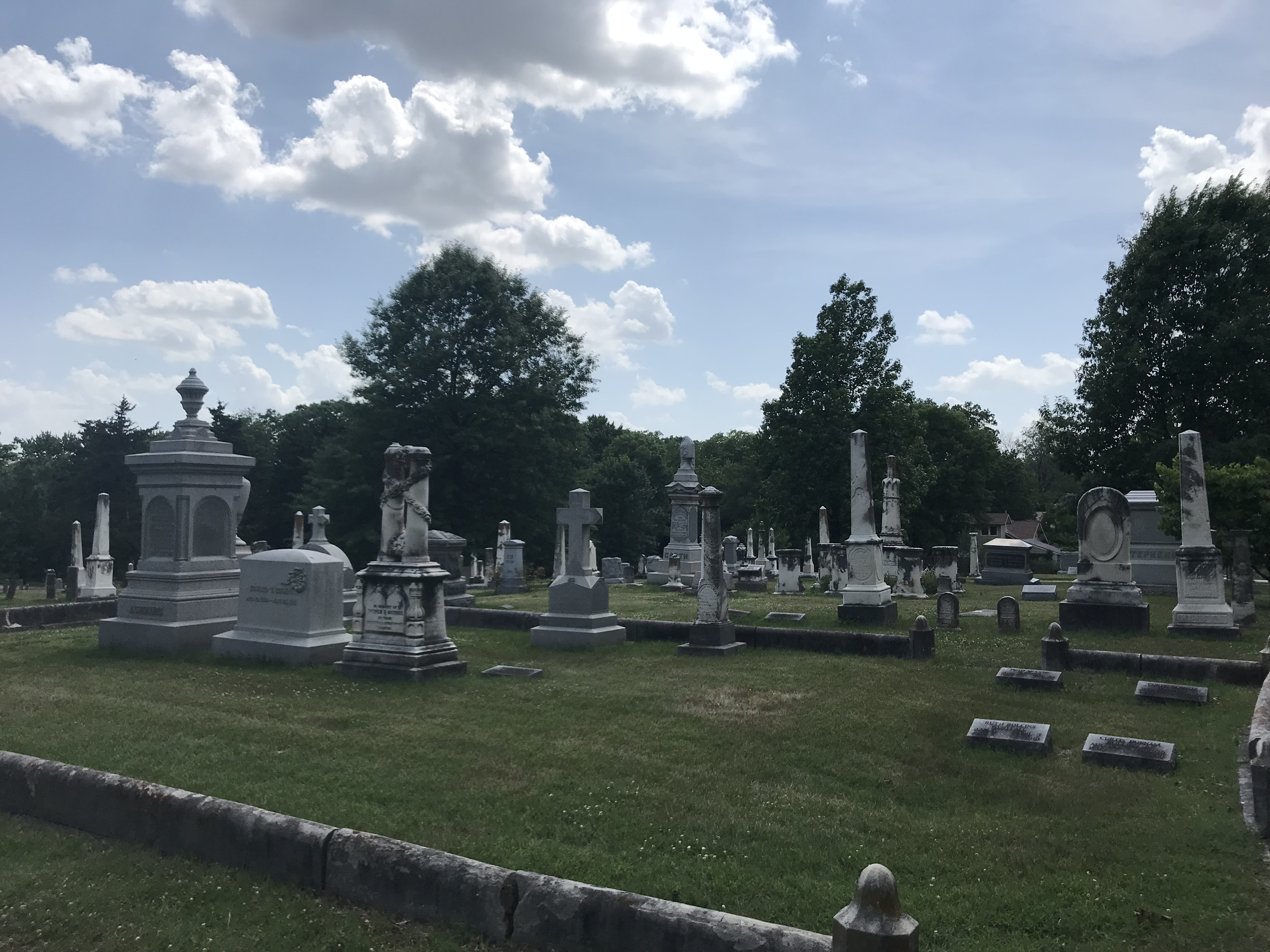
Original Columbia Common Burying Grounds

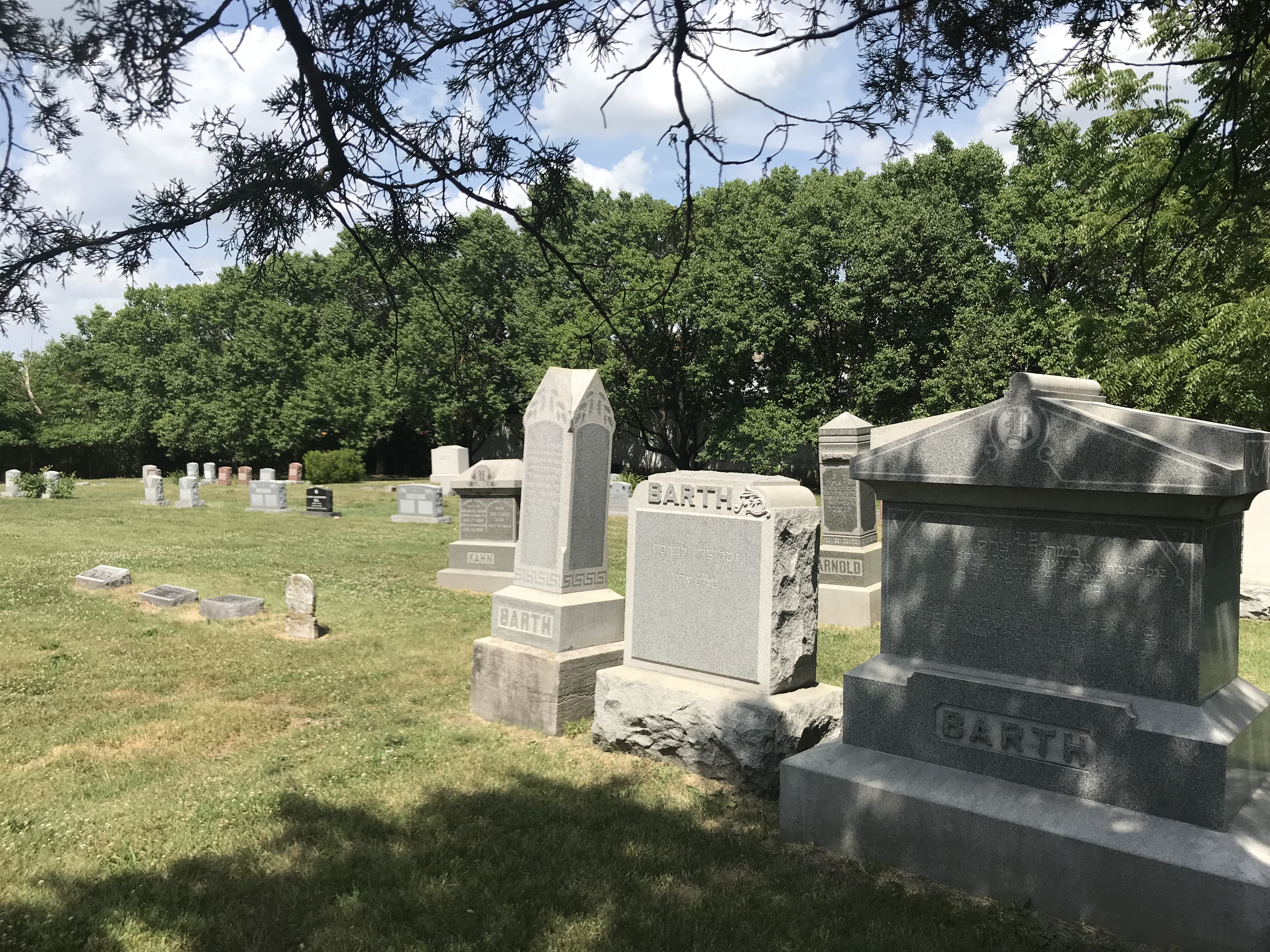
Beth Olem Jewish cemetery founded in 1880

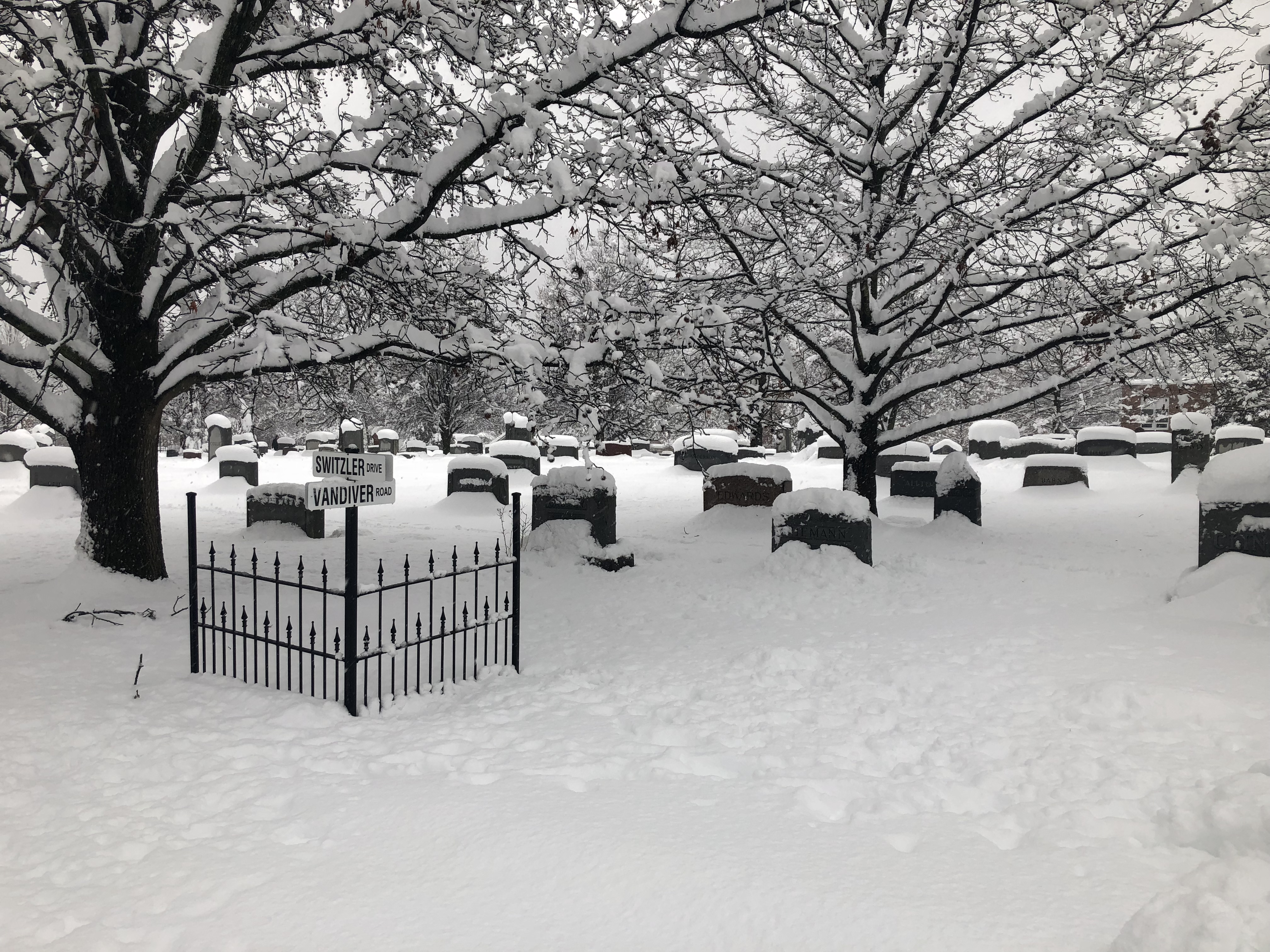
January 2019 after over 16 inches of snow

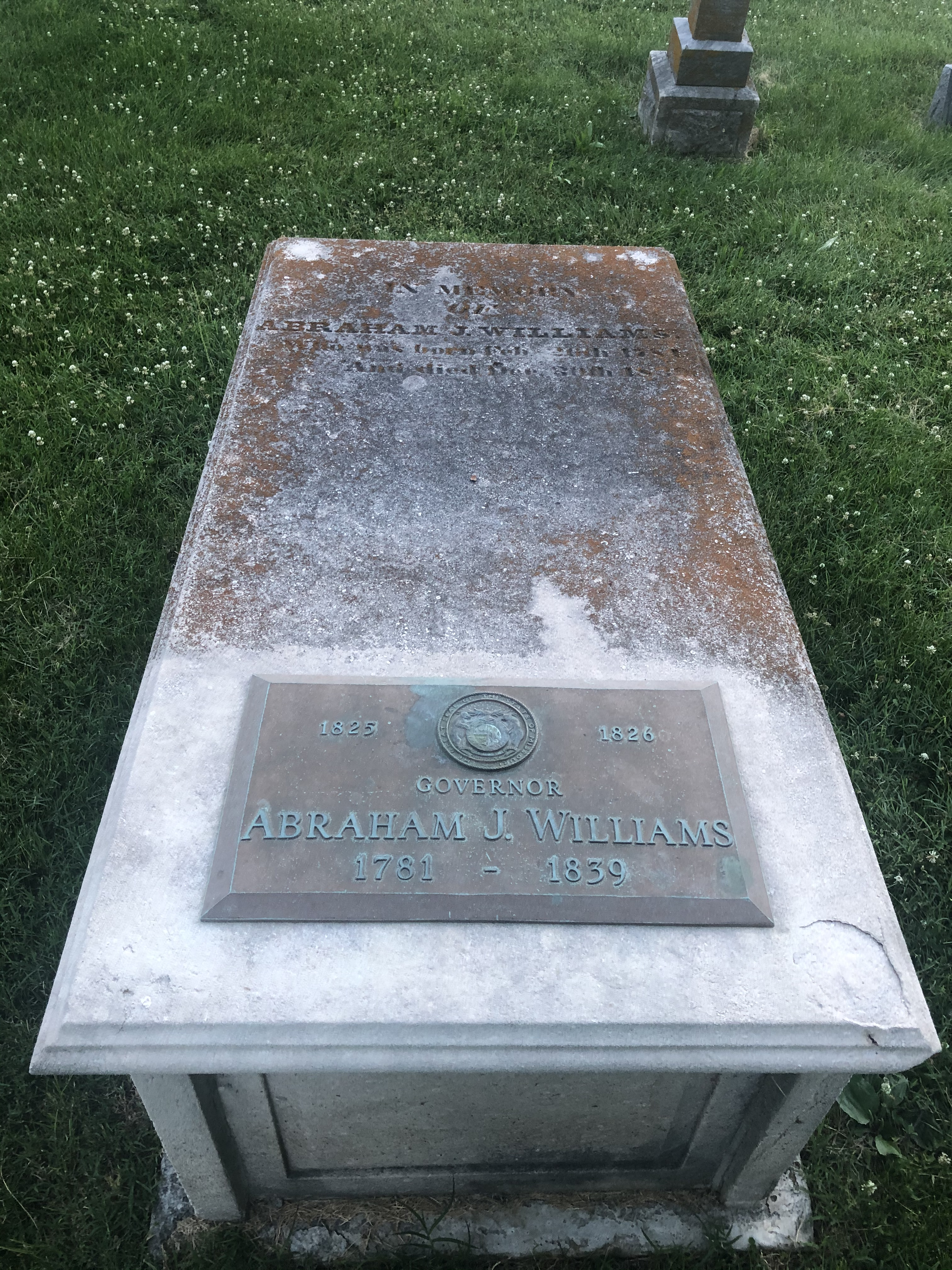
Tombstone of Abraham J. Williams, third governor of Missouri

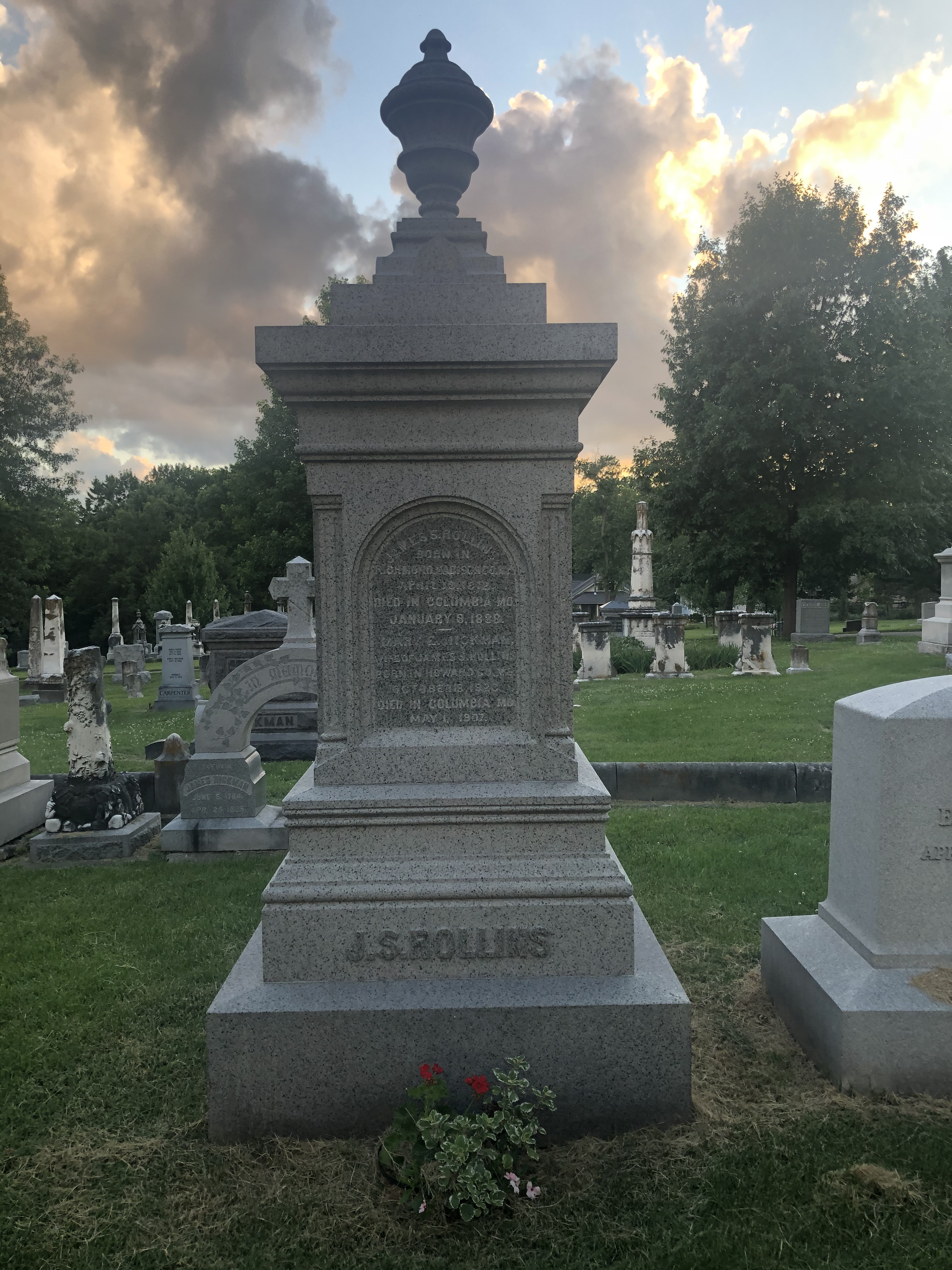
Tombstone of James S. Rollins

== See also ==
- List of cemeteries in Boone County, Missouri
