= Max Castillo =

Max Castillo may refer to:

- Max Castillo (university president), fourth president of the University of Houston–Downtown (UHD), 1992–2009
- Max Castillo (baseball) (born 1999), Venezuelan baseball pitcher in Major League Baseball
