= 2019 Wright State University faculty strike =

Education labor dispute in the United States

The Wright State University 2019 faculty strike was an American strike organized by the Wright State chapter of the American Association of University Professors (AAUP) in response to employment conditions imposed by the university. The strike began on January 22, 2019, after nearly two years of failed contract negotiations between the AAUP and the Wright State University administration. The strike ended on February 10, 2019. At a length of twenty days, it was one of the longest faculty strikes in the history of U.S. higher education. University President Cheryl B. Schrader received widespread criticism for her handling of the strike and stepped down from her position as a result.

== Background ==
Schrader entered the position of President of Wright State on July 1, 2017, after a time of financial and political turmoil at the school. Years of overspending had drained the reserve funds, according to the university's chapter of the American Association of University Professors. The university budget had already been cut by some $30 million by the board of trustees and the interim president before her arrival. According to Schrader, "the bulk of the budget cuts were supposed to have been completed" before she took over, but she faced further financial problems. By the end of her first year, she had implemented close to another $20 million more in cuts while producing a "projected" surplus of some $7 million, the first operating surplus since 2012. This earned her praise in her first annual review. However, controversy arose when the university released a statement implying she had declined to accept an annual raise or bonus, when in fact neither had been offered. The budget modifications did ultimately avoid a state fiscal watch, which had been considered likely in 2017 when she became president.

Schrader's approach to the university budget, as well as her general leadership during the first year were not without criticism. One member of the Wright State University Board of Trustees called her proposed 2019 fiscal year budget "a recipe for disaster." Schrader's strategic plan for the university, which had been specifically requested to be "different than anybody would see at another university," received criticism for being "overly broad" and "generic."

Relations between the administration and faculty, which were already strained by the financial difficulties, deteriorated early in Schrader's presidency. Members of the Wright State Chapter of the American Association of University Professors (AAUP) were particularly strident in their criticism of the handling of the budget. In November 2017, the Wright State AAUP chapter president remarked that the relationship with the administration was no longer "cordial." A major issue was the employment contract: the faculty had been working without one since June 2017. The union argued that the austerity measures in the contract being imposed by the administration were harmful to the students and to the educational mission of the institution, and that the faculty was being forced to bear a disproportionate burden of the financial crisis even though it had been brought by the administration. Tensions publicly erupted after a closed-door negotiating session in January 2018 when hundreds of faculty and students marched across campus to an open budget forum hosted by Schrader. More protests followed. At a February demonstration, a professor characterized the budget modifications as a "budget-cutting spree" that protects "extreme salaries and bloat of the upper administration" and "slashes" the core mission of the university. Some students also expressed concern about the impact the cuts would have on their studies.

== Contract dispute ==
Frustration mounted as the university entered the second fiscal year under Schrader's leadership without a faculty contract, even though both the administration and the faculty union acknowledged that the contract dispute was only one of many problems the university was facing. The administration insisted that the austerity measures in the contract were necessary, but the faculty union argued that the employment terms took power from the faculty and gave it to the administration, particularly in the areas of workload and imposed furloughs. Another issue was the right to collective bargaining, specifically, over health care. The faculty union also said that the reduction in benefits would amount to a nine percent pay cut. Talk of a strike, which had begun in January 2017 became more earnest in July. The faculty union maintained it would only strike if the president and board tried to "impose a contract that would damage education at Wright State."

The blame for the contract dispute shifted from the board of trustees and the former Wright State president to Schrader herself. Several hundred faculty protested the stalled contract negotiations at the October 19 meeting of the Wright State Board of Trustees. In November, some faculty members called for an expedited vote of "no-confidence" on Schrader. The faculty senate, however, voted against proceeding. (Note: This and some other sources incorrectly reported or implied that the no-confidence vote itself failed, which is not strictly true: the faculty senate vote concerned "shortening the process that could eventually lead to a vote.") The board president supported Schrader in the face of the no-confidence vote, while the faculty senate president said "morale is the lowest I can remember it being" after the senate's decision. A decline in morale among adjunct faculty was also indicated.

On January 4, 2019, the trustees voted to implement a "last, best offer" it had extended and the faculty union had rejected in November 2018, effectively imposing the rejected contract onto the faculty. In response, the faculty union announced a plan to strike on January 22. In a January 6 statement, Schrader described the employment terms as "fair" and said "we can return to the bargaining table when the university is back on solid financial footing." As the strike date drew closer, the faculty union maintained its willingness to negotiate and avoid a strike, and blamed Schrader personally for the impasse. Schrader stood firm in her support of the employment terms and the board of trustees. In a January 17 statement, Schrader said that renegotiation of the expired contract was "not possible." The faculty union argued that continuing to work under the imposed terms was tantamount to accepting the imposed contract, which would diminish the future bargaining power of the faculty union.

== Strike ==
On January 22, 2019, following almost two years of failed contract negotiations and unexpected employment conditions imposed by the administration, the Wright State chapter of the American Association of University Professors began a strike that would ultimately become the second-longest public university strike in U.S. history. Most of the 560 unionized faculty participated in the strike. Striking faculty and other supporters picketed entrances to the university. Protesters chanted for resumed negotiations, and for Schrader "to go." The strike received national attention, and the faculty union garnered widespread support from other universities, alumni, and lawmakers. Many letters of support were addressed to Schrader personally. Schrader and her administration ultimately received much criticism for how the strike was handled, especially after the faculty union ended up getting many of their demands.

Schrader had remained publicly optimistic in the face of the strike, downplaying the likelihood of the strike and its potential impact on the university. She gave the assurance that "classes will continue" during the strike, with the caveat that some might be "consolidated." When the strike began, Schrader kept the university running, instructing students to "go to class," even as an online petition called for her resignation. Schrader reportedly took over teaching two courses herself. Despite such efforts made by the university, there were widespread reports from students that their classes had no instructors, or that "covered" classes provided minimal or inadequate instruction.

=== Student reaction ===
The effect of the strike on the students was apparently profound, as reflected in social media posts. Many students expressed frustration about being "caught in the middle" between the striking faculty and the administration. Some students said they felt betrayed by the university; others expressed concern about the effect the strike was having on the reputation of the institution and how it would affect the value of their degree. One student said students were being "bombarded with information". Messages to students were later described as "confusing and sometimes intimidating." A number of students joined the picket lines alongside the faculty, although they were reportedly discouraged from doing so by threats against their financial aid. Near the end of the strike, the AAUP chapter president said between 75 and 250 students picketing with the striking faculty every day. There were also independent protests by students. Two separate student protests were held outside Schrader's office. The second, which occurred on day 16 of the strike, was a round-the-clock "sit-in" by some 30 students. The students had a list of demands, which included tuition reimbursement for course time lost. The demonstration ended after 42 hours, when Schrader agreed to meet with the students.

=== Full impact ===
Throughout the strike, Schrader and the administration continued to publicly downplay the impact it was having on the university, maintaining that 80 percent of classes were covered. A February 6 statement added that the number was "climbing" as more union faculty returned to the classroom. The faculty union disputed this, noting all the problems that they're having just running basic classes.” Some university statements did indeed seem inconsistent with university actions. On the third day of the strike, Schrader stated the university was "open and operating largely without issue," in spite of the widespread student complaints. That same day her administration filed a complaint with the Ohio State Employee Relations Board (SERB) asking that the strike be declared illegal. (Note: The complaint asserted that the faculty union was sabotaging the university by removing course materials from the university web system, and that individual union faculty had misled the administration when asked if they intended to strike. SERB rejected both. The faculty union had filed an earlier complaint that merely asking the faculty if they intended to strike was illegal.) When the board ruled that the strike could continue, she stated that the union's actions were "having a significant toll."

As the strike entered its third week, the true impact of the strike became more evident. The university advertized nationally for "long term" adjunct faculty in more than 80 fields, apparently to replace striking faculty. The school also began cancelling some "specialized" courses, which affected advanced students near graduation. It was reported that approximately 3,500 students had been affected by cancelled classes. While the university offered advising sessions to affected students, the faculty union asked Ohio Governor Mike DeWine to intervene, citing a belief that the administration was "losing touch with reality." The faculty union became increasingly vocal in their accusations of "union busting."

=== Deal to end the strike ===
With pressure mounting to end the strike, and no deal in sight, a federal negotiator was brought in. On Sunday February 10, day 20 of the strike, after a long weekend of negotiating, the faculty union and the administration negotiators reached a tentative agreement to end the strike. The faculty returned to work on Monday February 11. "Both parties made substantial concessions to help move the university forward together," Schrader said. The faculty union admitted it made some "serious financial concessions," such as agreeing to no pay raises until 2021, but kept protections on job security, workload, merit pay, and perhaps most significantly, the right to bargain over health care. On the whole, the faculty union hailed the agreement and considered the strike a success.
