= Susan Edwards =

Susan Edwards may refer to:

- Susan Edwards (murderer), British murderer, convicted of murdering her parents with her husband
- Susan Edwards (physiologist), Australian physiologist and academic administrator
