= List of chancellors of the University of Missouri–St. Louis =

Since the University of Missouri–St. Louis's formation in 1965, the campus was led by 8 chancellors and 4 interim chancellors. An interim chancellor, Christopher D. Spilling, has been leading the campus since Kristin Sobolik's retirement began in July 2026.

== Chancellors of the University of Missouri–St. Louis ==
These persons are listed below:

No.	Image	Name	Term start	Term end	Ref.
1		James L. Bugg Jr.	July 1, 1965	May 15, 1969 (Note: Resigned to head Old Dominion College.)	
acting		Glen Driscoll	May 15, 1969	November 7, 1969	
2		Glen Driscoll	November 7, 1969	August 15, 1972 (Note: Resigned to head the University of Toledo.)	
interim		Everett Walters	August 16, 1972	August 31, 1973	
3		Joseph Hartley	September 1, 1973	March 7, 1974	
interim		Emery Turner	March 7, 1974	March 30, 1975	
4		Arnold Grobman	April 1, 1975	December 31, 1985	
interim		Arthur MacKinney	January 1, 1986	May 31, 1986	
5		Marguerite Ross Barnett	June 1, 1986	July 31, 1990 (Note: Resigned to head the University of Houston.)	
interim		Blanche Touhill	August 1, 1990	March 20, 1991	
6		Blanche Touhill	March 20, 1991	December 31, 2002	
interim		Donald Driemeier	January 1, 2003	August 31, 2003	
7		Thomas F. George	September 1, 2003	August 31, 2019	
interim		Kristin Sobolik	September 1, 2019	April 9, 2020	
8		Kristin Sobolik	April 9, 2020	June 30, 2026	
interim		Christopher D. Spilling	July 1, 2026	Present	

Table notes:

== See also ==
- List of presidents of the University of Missouri System
- List of chancellors of the University of Missouri (Columbia)
- List of chancellors of the Missouri University of Science and Technology (Rolla)
- List of chancellors of the University of Missouri–Kansas City
