= Susan Edwards (physiologist) =

Australian physiologist and academic administrator

8th President of Wright State University
- Incumbent
- Assumed office January 1, 2020
- Preceded by: Cheryl B. Schrader

Personal details
- Education: Deakin University (BS, PhD); University of Melbourne (MS)
- Scientific career
- Fields: Physiology
- Institutions: James Cook University; Georgia Southern University; Appalachian State University
- Thesis: The identification of Na+/H+ exchangers in the gills of fishes (2000)

Susan L. Edwards is an Australian physiologist and academic administrator serving as president of Wright State University since 2020. She was previously a professor of biology and vice provost for faculty affairs at Appalachian State University.

== Life ==
Edwards completed a B.S. in biology and Ph.D. in comparative physiology from Deakin University. She earned a M.S. in neuroscience from the University of Melbourne.

Edwards was an associate professor in the department of physiology and pharmacology in the faculty of medicine, health, and molecular sciences at James Cook University. She was a visiting assistant professor in the department of biology at Georgia Southern University.

In 2007, Edwards left Australia and joined the department of biology at Appalachian State University (ASU). In 2012, she served as its chair. She later served as vice provost for faculty affairs and a professor of biology at ASU. In 2018, she joined Wright State University (WSU) as its executive vice president for academic affairs and provost. Shortly after joining WSU, she was diagnosed with breast cancer. Edwards announced she was in remission in April 2019. She became president on January 1, 2020. She succeeded Cheryl B. Schrader.
