= Geyer Act =

The Geyer Act of 1839 was an act of the Missouri State Legislature which established the public school system of Missouri as well as the University of Missouri in Columbia, Missouri. The act was introduced by congressman James S. Rollins from Boone County and named after its author, Henry Geyer. Rollins became known as the "Father of the University of Missouri" in part because of his support in the bills passaged. The act was designed after Thomas Jefferson's plan for public education in Virginia. Most of the act was revoked by 1841 out of practicality, but still the foundations of public education in Missouri can be traced to the passage of the Geyer Act.

== See also ==
- History of the University of Missouri
- Missouri Department of Elementary and Secondary Education
