= C. Mauli Agrawal =

Indian-born American academic

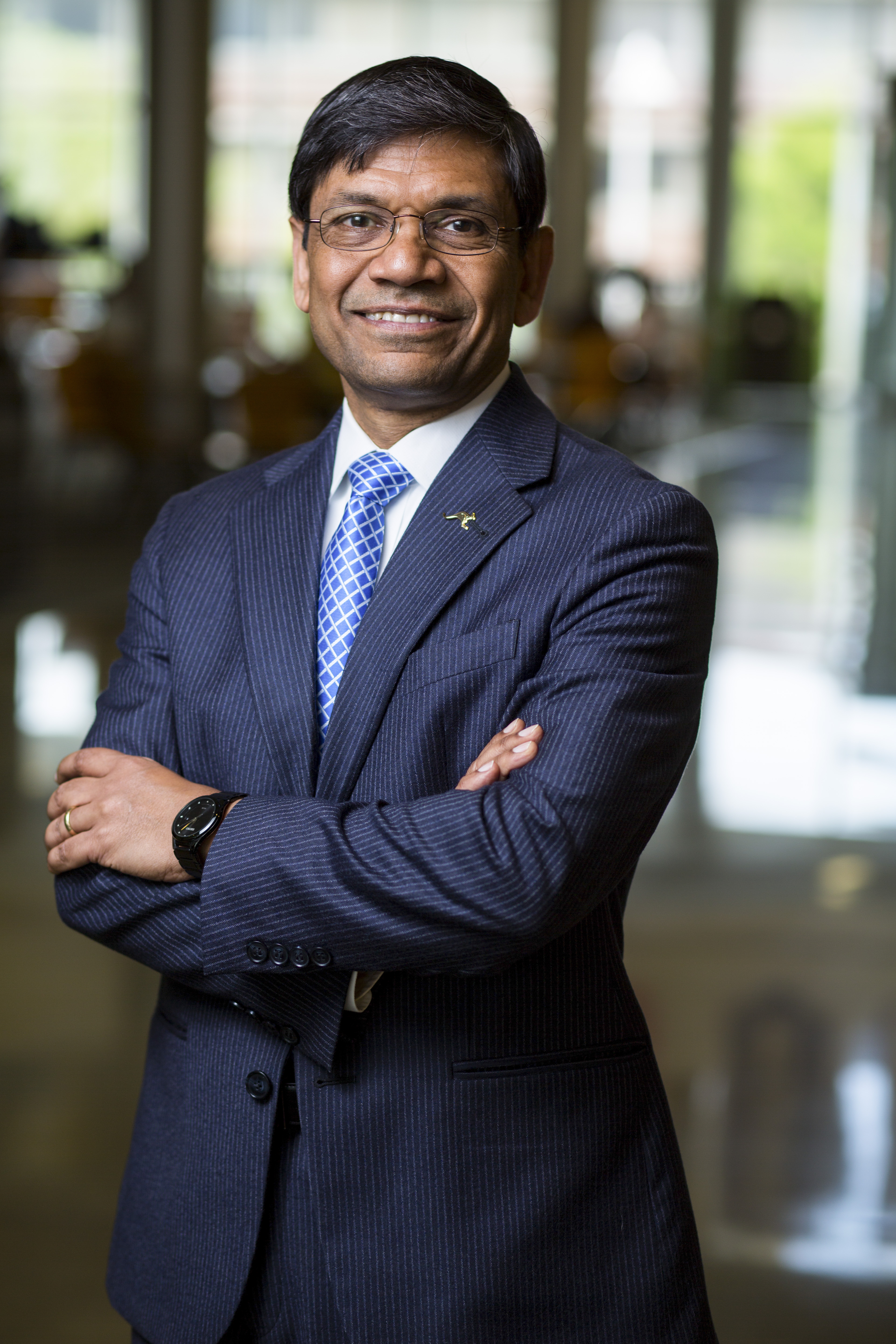
- Agrawal in 2018

14th Chancellor of the University of Missouri–Kansas City
- Incumbent
- Assumed office June 2018

Personal details
- Born: Allahabad, India
- Education: Indian Institute of Technology Kanpur (BT); Clemson University (MS); Duke University (PhD)
- Scientific career
- Fields: biomedical engineering
- Workplaces: Duke University; University of Texas Health Science Center at San Antonio; University of Texas at San Antonio; University of Missouri–Kansas City
- Thesis: Plane strain fracture toughness testing and the fracture morphology of polycarbonate (1989)
- Doctoral advisor: George W. Pearsall

C. Mauli Agrawal is an Indian-American academic, who has been chancellor of the University of Missouri–Kansas City since June 2018.

== Early life and education ==
Born in Prayagraj (formerly Allahabad), India, Agrawal earned a Bachelor's degree of Technology from the Indian Institute of Technology Kanpur. Agrawal then moved to the United States, earning a Master of Science degree in mechanical engineering from Clemson University in 1985, and a PhD in mechanical engineering from Duke University in 1989.

== Career ==
Upon graduation with a degree from IIT-Kanpur in 1982, Agrawal worked as an engineer in the automobile industry in Chennai (formerly Madras), India. After completing his graduate work (1983–89) in the US, he served as a research faculty at Duke University before moving to San Antonio in 1991 where he joined the UT Health Science Center (UTHSCSA) as a faculty in orthopedics.

After 12 years at UTHSCSA, he moved to the University of Texas at San Antonio (UTSA), where he was instrumental in starting the biomedical engineering degree program and served in many roles including the Dean of Engineering, Vice President for Research, and interim-Provost.

In 2018 he moved to Kansas City to serve as the 14th Chancellor of the University of Missouri Kansas City (UMKC)

== Research ==
Agrawal’s research has focused on orthopedic and cardiovascular biomaterials and implants. He has authored over 29 patents and has more than 300 articles in several scientific journals and publications. He has also authored two books including a text book on biomaterials. His inventions have been licensed to different biomedical companies.

== Awards ==
Agrawal is a Fellow of:

- National Academy of Inventors
- American Association for the Advancement of Science
- International Union of Societies for Biomaterials
- American Institute for Medical and Biological Engineering.

Other national recognitions include:

- The Palmaz Award 2010 (Biomed SA)
- Service Award 2013 from the Society for Biomaterials
- Distinguished Alumnus Award 2020 from the Indian Institute of Technology Kanpur

He served as president of the Society for Biomaterials in 2006.
