= Mather High School =

Location
- 5835 N. Lincoln Avenue; Chicago, Illinois 60659; United States; 41.9880°N 87.7011°W

Information
- School type: Public Secondary
- Motto: "Celebrating Diversity"
- Opened: 1959
- School district: Chicago Public Schools
- CEEB code: 141307
- Principal: Gary J Tesinsky
- Grades: 9–12
- Gender: Coed
- Enrollment: 1,448 (2018–2019)
- Campus type: Urban
- Colors: Royal blue White
- Athletics conference: Chicago Public League
- Team name: Rangers
- Accreditation: North Central Association of Colleges and Schools
- Yearbook: Dais
- Website: matherhs.org

Stephen Tyng Mather High School (commonly known as simply Mather) is a public four-year high school located in the West Ridge neighborhood on the north side of Chicago, Illinois, United States. Opened in 1959, Mather is operated by the Chicago Public Schools (CPS) district. Mather is named in honor of Stephen Mather, an industrialist and conservationist who became the first director of the National Park Service.

== Background ==
=== Campus and Faculty ===
Mather is a neighborhood high school with a college preparatory emphasis. More than 75% of students speak a language other than English at home. Mather's Bilingual/English as a Second Language (ESL) program is central to the school's curriculum. The school campus shares two acres (56,000 m^{2}) with adjacent Mather Park. The school has teachers fluent in languages such as Chinese, Arabic, Assyrian, Spanish, Russian, Serbo-Croat, Gujarati, and Urdu.

== Academics ==
Advanced Placement (AP) classes are offered:

- Art/Studio Art
- English Language and Composition
- English Literature and Composition
- U.S. History
- U.S. Government
- World History
- Calculus AB
- Chemistry
- Biology
- Statistics
- Psychology
- Physics
- Spanish

Virtual High School classes are offered in a wide variety of subjects at various ability levels.

== Athletics ==
Mather competes in the Chicago Public League (CPL) and is a member of the Illinois High School Association (IHSA). The school sport teams are nicknamed the Rangers. The boys' baseball team were public league champions in 1966–67. The boys' cross country team were regional champs in (2011–12, 2012–13, 2015–16)The girls' soccer team were public league champions in 2000–01. During the 2000–01 season, The girls' softball team were Class AA and public league champions. The girls' volleyball team were Class AA and public league champions twice (1995–96, 2001–02). The school's chess team were Class AA champions in 1991–92. The boys' soccer team were public league champions five times (1983–84, 1985–86, 1988–89, 2000–01, 2011–12) and State champions once (2011–12). The boys' golf team were public league champions in 1974. The boys' tennis team were public league champions twice (1973–74, 1974–75).

== Notable alumni ==
- Awa III, 122nd Catholicos-Patriarch of the Assyrian Church of the East
- Robert Berland, judoka and coach who became the first American to receive as high as a silver medal in Olympic judo, winning the silver medal at the 1984 Olympics.
- Mun Choi, Current President of the University of Missouri
- Stephen Elliott, writer, editor, and filmmaker
- Noah Falstein, game designer and producer
- Frank Klopas, former soccer player, coach, and television broadcaster. He played on the U.S. national soccer team in the 1988 Olympics and the 1994 FIFA World Cup.
- Qudus Lawal, Professional soccer player who led Mather to state and city championships.
- Max Levchin, internet entrepreneur who founded PayPal, Slide.com, and Affirm.
- Harry Rushakoff, Former drummer for the band Concrete Blonde.
- Ira I. Silverstein, member of the Illinois Senate (1999–2019).
