= Wright State University =

Public university in Fairborn, Ohio, US

- Motto: Ad docendum, Investigandum, Serviendum (Latin)
- Motto in English: Teaching, Research, Service
- Type: Public research university
- Established: 1967; 59 years ago
- Parent institution: University System of Ohio
- Accreditation: HLC
- Academic affiliations: CUMU; Space-grant
- Endowment: $120.15 million (2024)
- President: Susan Edwards
- Provost: James Denniston
- Academic staff: 1,139
- Administrative staff: 1,108
- Students: 10,264 (Dayton); 11,469 (all campuses)
- Undergraduates: 7,415 (Dayton); 8,619 (all campuses)
- Postgraduates: 2,849 (Dayton); 2,850 (all campuses)
- Location: Fairborn, Ohio, United States; 39.785°N 84.059°W
- Campus: Suburban
- Colors: Green and Gold
- Nickname: Raiders
- Sporting affiliations: NCAA Division I – Horizon League
- Mascots: Gray Wolf, Raider personified as Rowdy Raider
- Website: wright.edu

Wright State University is a public research university in Fairborn, Ohio, United States (with a Dayton mailing address). Originally opened in 1964 as a branch campus of Miami University and Ohio State University, it became an independent institution in 1967 and was named in honor of aviation pioneers Orville and Wilbur Wright, who were residents of nearby Dayton. The university offers bachelor's, master's, and doctoral degrees and is classified among "R2: Doctoral Universities – High research activity". It is a member of the University System of Ohio. Its athletic teams, the Wright State Raiders, compete in Division I of the NCAA as members of the Horizon League. In addition to the main campus, the university also operates a regional campus near Celina, Ohio, called Wright State University–Lake Campus.

== History ==
Wright State University first opened in 1964 as a branch campus of Miami University and Ohio State University, occupying only a single building. Groundwork on forming the institution began in 1961 during a time when the region lacked a public university for higher education. A community-wide fundraising effort was conducted in 1962 to establish the university, and the campaign raised the $3 million needed in seed money. Much of the land that the campus was built on was donated by the United States Air Force from excess acreage of Wright-Patterson Air Force Base.

The Ohio General Assembly passed legislation in 1965 that transformed the branch campus into a separate institution with its own Advisory Committee on November 5, 1965. It was anticipated the campus would achieve full independent status by 1967 with its rapidly increasing enrollment of full-time students, projected to reach 5,000 within two years. On October 1, 1967, the campus officially became Wright State University following a decision by the Ohio Board of Regents. The name honors the Wright brothers, well-known Dayton residents who are credited with inventing the world's first successful airplane. In 1969, a 173-acre (70 ha) branch campus opened on the shore of Grand Lake St. Marys in Celina, Ohio.

During the 2008 United States presidential campaign, Republican nominee John McCain announced his selection of Sarah Palin as his running mate and choice for vice president on August 29, 2008, at Wright State. The campaign winner Barack Obama held a major rally at Wright State during the campaign as well. On September 23, 2015, the Commission on Presidential Debates named Wright State the host for the first 2016 United States presidential debate, which was scheduled for September 26, 2016 at the Nutter Center. On July 19, 2016, Wright State University backed out of the debate, citing inability to cover the cost of security.

Wright State University celebrated its 50th anniversary in 2017, culminating with a homecoming event. That same year, the university officially became tobacco-free on its Dayton and Lake campuses.

Wright State's faculty, which are unionized and represented by the American Association of University Professors (AAUP), went on strike in 2019 following two years of failed contract negotiations. The faculty were joined by various groups, including other labor unions, community members, and a student-led labor rights group called Students for Faculty. An agreement was reached the following month, ending the strike, but its length of twenty days was the longest in Ohio history among higher education institutions and one of the longest in US history

Susan Edwards became university's president on January 1, 2020. Previous university presidents were Brage Golding (1966–1973), Robert J. Kegerreis (1973–1985), Paige E. Mulhollan (1985–1994), Harley E. Flack (1994–1998), Kim Goldenberg (1998–2006), David R. Hopkins (2007–2017), and Cheryl B. Schrader (2017–2019). Curtis L. McCray was the interim president from March 17 through June 30, 2017, holding the position following Hopkins' early retirement on March 17, 2017. Schrader was Wright State's seventh president—and first female president—from mid 2017 until she stepped down at the end of 2019 midway through her five-year appointment.

== Campus ==
Wright State University has a system of underground tunnels that connect 20 out of 22 buildings together. Initially installed between the first two buildings on campus in 1964 and 1965 for construction maintenance access, staff and students also started using the tunnels. As a result, Wright State has been top ranked for wheelchair accessibility on campus.

== Academics ==
Academic rankings

National
- Forbes: 198
- U.S. News & World Report: 230-301
- Washington Monthly: 246
- WSJ/College Pulse: 601-800

Global
- U.S. News & World Report: 1060

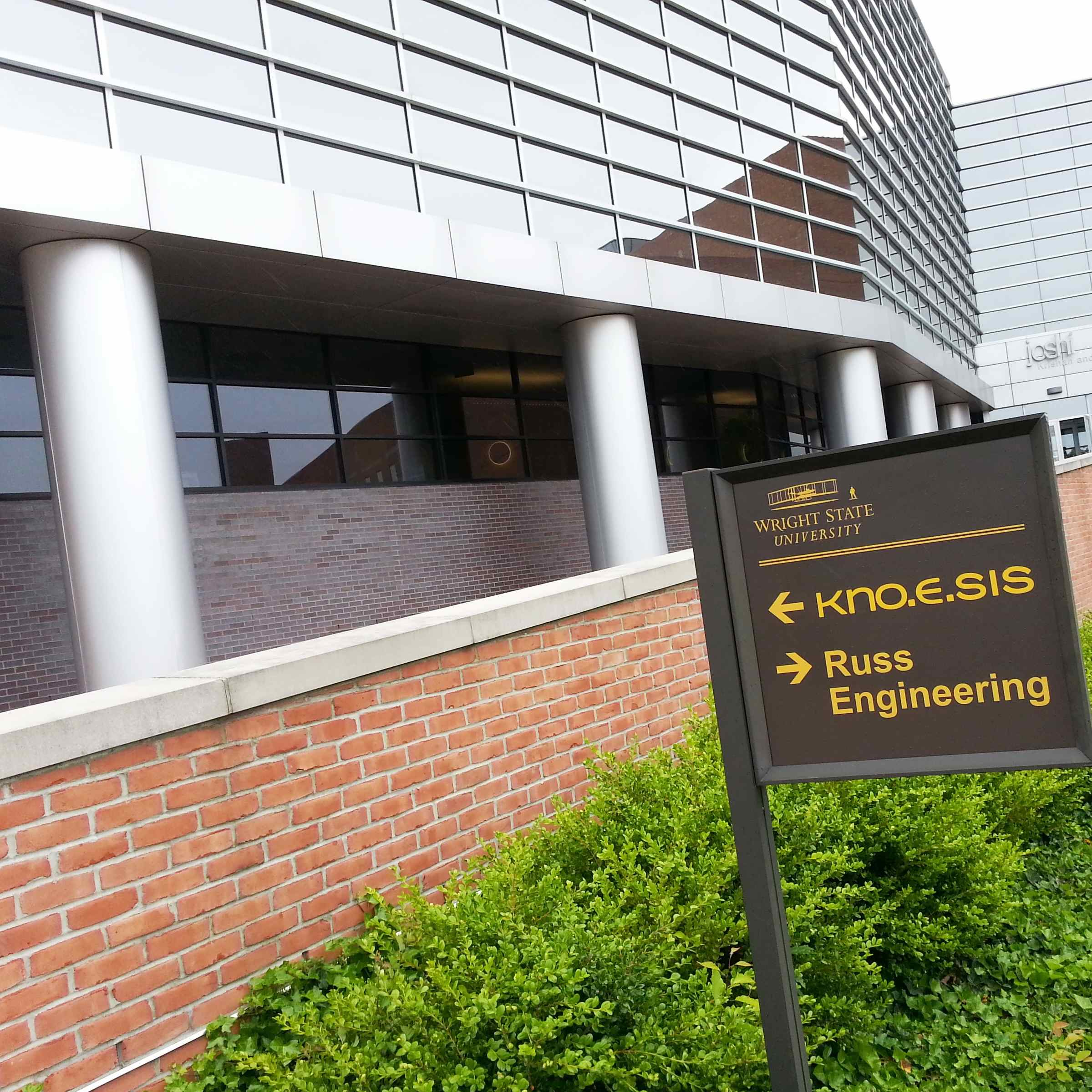
Kno.e.sis Center at Wright State University

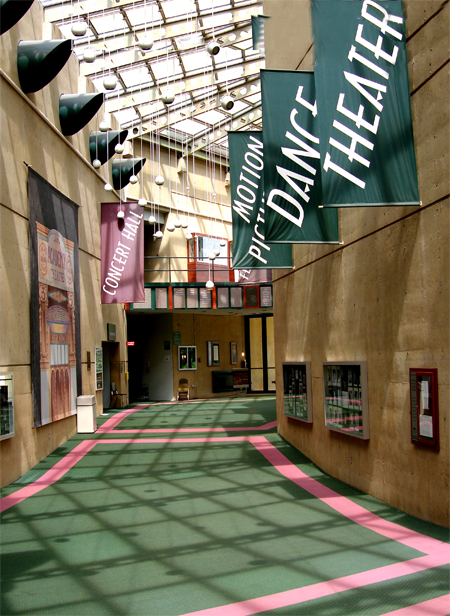
Lobby of the Wright State University Creative Arts Center in 2007

The university is accredited by the Higher Learning Commission at the doctoral degree-granting level. Wright State is divided into seven colleges and three schools. Wright State offers 106 bachelor's degrees in the following colleges: the Raj Soin College of Business, the College of Health, Education and Human Services, the College of Engineering and Computer Sciences, the College of Liberal Arts, and the College of Science and Mathematics. The Lake Campus also offers a limited number of complete bachelor's and master's degrees, as well as 15 associate degrees.

Wright State offers 136 graduate programs (including doctoral programs) through the Wright State University Graduate School, the Boonshoft School of Medicine, and the School of Professional Psychology. The Boonshoft School of Medicine was established in 1973. It is accredited by the Liaison Committee on Medical Education. The school adopted its current name in 2005 in honor of the Oscar Boonshoft family, major donors to the medical school.

In 2009, Wright State University's fine arts departments created the Collaborative Education, Leadership, and Innovation in the Arts (CELIA) program, which worked to create arts programs and performances in the Dayton region, such as a collaboration with the Dayton Philharmonic.

Wright State University offers Air Force Reserve Officer Training Corps (AFROTC) and Army ROTC programs on campus, known as Detachment 643 and the Raider Battalion, respectively. The Air Force ROTC program contains the cross town schools of the University of Dayton, Cedarville University, and Sinclair Community College.

=== Research ===
The Ohio Center of Excellence in Knowledge-Enabled Computing (Kno.e.sis) was founded in 2007. In 2009, the Ohio Department of Higher Education established more than 50 Centers of Excellence representing key industrial areas with potential future growth. Kno.e.sis at the Wright State University was one of the selections in the area of Bio-Health Innovations. Research at the center focuses on multidisciplinary areas such as Web 3.0 (Semantic Web, Semantic Sensor Web), Network Science, Social Data Analysis, Machine Learning, Data Mining, Bioinformatics, Natural Language Processing, Visualization, Cloud Computing, High Performance Computing. In recent years, Kno.e.sis has had nearly 80–100 researchers, including 15 faculty and over 60 funded graduate (primarily PhD) students. Kno.e.sis researchers overtime have contributions in the areas related to Computer Science with focus on topics in World Wide Web, including Semantic web, Social Data Analysis, Semantic Sensor Web, and Linked Open Data. Furthermore, they have been a part of developing technical specifications and guidelines for W3C, until 2013.

== Student life ==
Wright State University has several fraternities and sororities.

== Athletics ==
The Wright State Raiders are the athletics teams of Wright State University. The school participates in fifteen sports at the Division I level of the NCAA, and are members of the Horizon League. The school's mascot is Rowdy Raider, a wolf.
