= William Wilson Elwang =

Presbyterian minister

William Wilson Elwang (November 16, 1865 - November 28, 1938) was a Presbyterian minister, teacher, and author. He served as historian of the Sigma Alpha Epsilon fraternity from 1887.

His thesis studying the "Negroes" of Columbia, Missouri and the "race problem" was conducted via canvassing black households. Elwang depicted the African American community in Columbia as "shiftless" and recommended manual labor colleges. Elwang's conclusions included a declining African American population in Columbia due to birth and death rates and a disappearance of "Negroes" due to interbreeding with whites. Raymond Weeks criticized the book and stated it included false accusations of thieving in a letter to W. E. B. Du Bois. He married twice and had a daughter. He died in Columbia and is buried in the Columbia Cemetery in Columbia, Missouri. The State Historical Society of Missouri has a collection of his papers.

== Works ==
- Elwang, William (1904). The Negros of Columbia, Missouri: A Concrete study of the Race Problem. Columbia, Missouri: Department of Sociology, University of Missouri.
- The Social Function of Religious Belief (1908)
- The Negroes of Columbia, Missouri : a concrete study of the race problem (1908). ISBN 9780259681496.
- The German Universities and University Study, co-author with Friedrich Paulsen, Frank Thilly,
- A history of the pioneer families of Missouri : with numerous sketches, anecdotes, adventures, etc., relating to early days in Missouri : also the lives of Daniel Boone and the celebrated Indian chief Black Hawk, with numerous biographies and histories of primitive institutions co-author with William Smith Bryan and Robert Rose, Lucas Bros., Columbia, Mo., 1935
