= Benjamin Blake Minor =

American lawyer and academic (1818–1905)

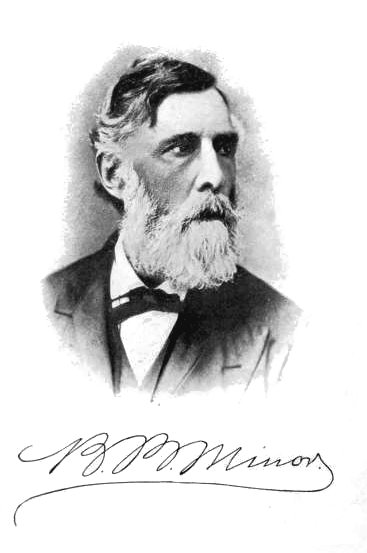
Benjamin Blake Minor

Benjamin Blake Minor (October 21, 1818 – August 1, 1905) was an American writer, educator, legal scholar, and fourth President of the University of Missouri, from 1860 to 1862. Today, he is most known as the editor of the Southern Literary Messenger. He also compiled the second edition of the reports of the decisions of George Wythe, published in 1852.

== Biography ==
Benjamin Blake Minor was born in Tappahannock, Virginia on October 21, 1818 to Dr. Hubbard Taylor Minor and Jane (Blake) Minor. He attended Bristol College, Pennsylvania, during the sessions of 1833-34, the University of Virginia, 1834–37, graduating in several of its schools, and subsequently entered the College of William and Mary, graduating in moral and political science and law in the class of 1839. He practiced law in Petersburg, Virginia, 1840–41 and then moved his practice to Richmond.

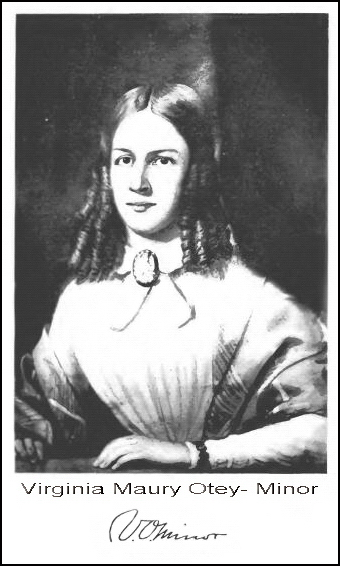
Virginia Maury Otey, wife of Benjamin Blake Minor

Minor married Virginia Maury Otey, daughter of James Hervey Otey, on May 26, 1842. They had five children.

From 1843 to 1847, he was owner and editor of the Southern Literary Messenger. He became principal of the Virginia Female Institute, Staunton, from 1847 to 1848, and founded the Home School for Young Ladies, Richmond, 1848. He originated the historical department of the Society of Alumni of the University of Virginia, in 1845; the same year, he was vice-president of the commercial convention at Memphis. in 1847 was a chief factor in the revival of the Historical Society of Virginia of which he was made a life member. He was made a corresponding member of the historical societies of New York and Wisconsin, and secretary of the African Colonization Society of Virginia and of the Virginia Bible Society, which antedates the American Bible Society.

He resumed the practice of law in Richmond in 1848 and the same year was the mover and author of the memorial to the Virginia legislature that led to the erection of the Washington Monument on Capitol Square; was commissioned lieutenant-colonel of the Nineteenth Virginia militia; was a warden, register and diocesan delegate of St. James' Church, and one of the founders of the Richmond Male Orphan Asylum.

On July 4, 1860, he was elected president of the State University of Missouri, and served until the curators suspended the work of the university during the American Civil War. He became principal of a female seminary in St. Louis, 1865–69; life insurance state agent and superintendent, also public lecturer, 1869–89, and in the latter named year rejoined his family in Richmond, Virginia, and engaged in literary work; he edited a complete edition of "Reports of Chancellor George Wythe, with a Memoir of the Author;" a new edition of Hening & Munford's Virginia Reports, and contributed to law journals in New York City; he received the honorary degree of Doctor of Laws from the State University of Missouri in 1894, and in 1896 was made secretary of the Virginia Society Sons of the American Revolution.

Benjamin Blake Minor died in 1905.

== See also ==
- History of the University of Missouri

Academic offices
Preceded by William Wilson Hudson	President of the University of Missouri; 1860–1862	Succeeded by John Hiram Lathrop
