= Frederick Middlebush =

American professor and university administrator

Frederick Middlebush (October 15, 1890 – June 8, 1971) was an American educator and thirteenth president of the University of Missouri in Columbia, Missouri from 1935 to 1954. His presidency was the longest term ever served at the university. His presidency included the completion of the Memorial Union and a tripling in enrollment after World War II. Middlebush Hall, on the Columbia campus, is named after him. He is buried in Columbia at the Columbia Cemetery.

== Role in Segregation ==
Middlebush played a key role in continuing segregation on the University of Missouri campus prior to 1950. He was instrumental in working to try to deny African-American applicant Lloyd Gaines admission to Missouri's law school in the mid-1930s. Documents in the University Archives show that Middlebush and administrator Thomas Brady worked to prevent Black students from coming to the university to participate in a United Nations conference held in 1947.

== See also ==
- History of the University of Missouri

Academic offices
Preceded by Walter Williams	President of the University of Missouri; 1931–1935	Succeeded by Elmer Ellis
