= Max Castillo (university president) =

American university president

Max Castillo was the fourth president of the University of Houston–Downtown (UHD) from 1992 to 2009. He has served as the longest president of UHD as of his retirement date on July 31, 2009. Castillo holds a Bachelor of Arts and Master of Arts from St. Mary's University, and a Doctor of Education from the University of Houston. Prior to becoming president of UHD, he served as president of San Antonio College from 1982 to 1992.

Academic offices
Preceded by Manuel T. Pacheco	President of the University of Houston–Downtown; 1992–2009	Succeeded by William V. Flores
