= C. Brice Ratchford =

Charles Brice Ratchford (better known as C. Brice Ratchford) (1920 – December 18, 1997) was the 15th president of the University of Missouri System from 1970 to 1976.

== Early life ==
Ratchford was raised in Gastonia, North Carolina. He attended junior college at Brevard College. He received a bachelor's and master's in agricultural economics from North Carolina State University (then called college) in 1942 and 1947 respectively. He also received a doctorate in economics from Duke University in 1951.

Ratchford helped build North Carolina's extension program.

== University of Missouri ==
He came to the University of Missouri in 1959 as director of the Missouri Cooperative Extension Service, was named dean of extension in 1960 and vice president of extension in 1965 (when the four campus University of Missouri system was created).

In October 1970 he was named interim president of the Missouri system and became full-time president in 1971. He resigned in 1976 citing health concerns.

He took a sabbatical working for the extension service at Kansas State University but returned to Missouri in 1977 to work again in the extension service and teach agricultural economics.

Academic offices
Preceded by John C. Weaver	President of the University of Missouri System; 1970-1976	Succeeded by James C. Olson
