= John Carleton Jones =

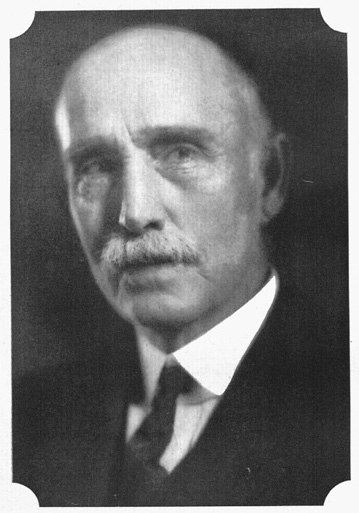
Jones pictured in The Savitar 1923, Missouri yearbook

John Carleton Jones (July 30, 1856 – April 22, 1930) was an American educator and tenth president of the University of Missouri in Columbia, Missouri; in recognition, he was initiated as an honorary member of Acacia Fraternity. Though he held the post for only three years he was important in the construction of the Memorial Union (University of Missouri) and Faurot Field. Jones Hall is named in his honor. He is buried in Columbia at the Columbia Cemetery.

His son was Lloyd E. Jones, a United States Army officer who served in both World War I and World War II, where he commanded the 10th Mountain Division and retired as a major general.

== See also ==
- History of the University of Missouri

Academic offices
Preceded by Albert Ross Hill	President of the University of Missouri; 1922–1923	Succeeded by Stratton Brooks
