= James Shannon (academic) =

Irish American academic (1799–1859)

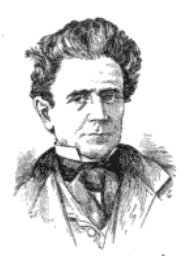
James Shannon

James Shannon (1799–1859) was an Irish American academic, evangelist and second President of the University of Missouri He was born in Monaghan County, Ireland and educated at the Royal Belfast Academical Institution. Shannon was also a co-founder of Columbia College and the first president of Culver-Stockton College. He is buried at the Columbia Cemetery in Columbia, Missouri.

Shannon is the author of the 1855 pro-slavery pamphlet An address delivered before the Pro-slavery convention of the state of Missouri, held in Lexington, July 13, 1855, on domestic slavery, as examined in the light of Scripture, of natural rights, of civil government, and the constitutional power of Congress.

== See also ==
- History of the University of Missouri

Academic offices
| Preceded by John Hiram Lathrop | President of the University of Missouri; 1850–1856 | Succeeded by William Wilson Hudson |
