= John Hiram Lathrop =

American lawyer (1799–1866)

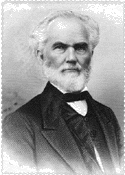
- Lathrop as President of The University of Missouri

1st & 5th President of the University of Missouri
- In office 1865–1866
- Preceded by: Benjamin Blake Minor
- Succeeded by: Daniel Read
- In office 1841–1849
- Succeeded by: James Shannon

4th President of Indiana University
- In office 1859–1860
- Preceded by: William Mitchel Daily
- Succeeded by: Cyrus Nutt

1st Chancellor of the University of Wisconsin
- In office 1849–1858
- Succeeded by: Henry Barnard

Personal details
- Born: January 22, 1799 Sherburne, New York, US
- Died: August 2, 1866 (aged 67) Columbia, Missouri, US
- Resting place: Columbia Cemetery

Academic background
- Education: Yale University

Academic work
- Discipline: Mathematics and natural philosophy
- Institutions: Hamilton College; University of Missouri; University of Wisconsin; Indiana University

John Hiram Lathrop (January 22, 1799 – August 2, 1866) was an American educator during the early 19th century. He served as the first President of both the University of Missouri and the University of Wisconsin as well as president of Indiana University.

== Early life ==
John Lathrop was born in Sherburne, New York in 1799. He attended Yale University, graduating in 1819 and teaching for three years at Farmington, Connecticut. He later became a tutor at his alma mater from 1822 until 1826 when he was admitted to the bar and practiced at Middletown, Connecticut. He also spent some time teaching in Norwich, Vermont and Gardiner, Maine. In 1829 he became professor of mathematics and natural philosophy at Hamilton College in Clinton, New York.

He was married to Frances E. Lothrop [sic] student of Sarah Pierce's Litchfield Female Academy. Her mother was a sister to Harvard University president John Thornton Kirkland and daughter of Samuel Kirkland, founder of Hamilton College.

His son is Gardiner Lathrop who was founder of the Kansas City law firm Lathrop & Gage.

== Academic career ==
=== First term at the University of Missouri ===
The University of Missouri was founded in 1839 as the first public or state university west of the Mississippi River. Professor Lathrop was chosen as its first president in 1840, a position he held until 1849. He is credited with laying the foundations for the university's first century.

=== University of Wisconsin ===
In 1849, Lathrop was elected the first chancellor of the University of Wisconsin–Madison. During his tenure as chancellor, he established the academic setting at the university, and he recommended the university's seal and motto, "Numen Lumen." He was nominated for the position of the first president of the restructured University of Michigan in 1852 after Henry Barnard declined the job; however, Henry Philip Tappan was elected instead. He resigned in 1858 due to problems with the regents and legislature, but remained the acting chancellor until Henry Barnard officially became the chancellor in 1859.

=== Indiana University ===
Upon the death of Indiana University's first president Andrew Wylie in 1851, the Board of Trustees sought Lathrop as his replacement. Elsewhere occupied, he declined. Upon the abrupt departure of President William Mitchel Daily in 1859, the Indiana University Board of Trustees once again sought to fill the office with Lathrop. This time, he accepted, and took office on September 20, 1859. His inauguration took place July 11, 1860 and directly thereafter he submitted his resignation to the Board.

=== Second term at the University of Missouri ===
After resigning the presidency of Indiana University in 1859 after only one year, he returned to the University of Missouri as a professor of English literature. He was re-elected president in 1865, the only president ever to hold two separate terms, and held that office until his death in Columbia, Missouri in 1866. He is buried in Columbia at the Columbia Cemetery

== See also ==
- History of the University of Missouri
- List of presidents and chancellors of the University of Wisconsin–Madison

Academic offices
New title First president	1st President of the University of Missouri; 1841–1849	Succeeded by James Shannon
New title First chancellor	1st Chancellor of the University of Wisconsin–Madison; 1849–1858	Succeeded by Henry Barnard
Preceded by William Mitchel Daily	4th President of Indiana University; 1859–1860	Succeeded by Cyrus Nutt
Preceded by Benjamin Blake Minor	5th President of the University of Missouri; 1865–1866	Succeeded by Daniel Read
