= Manuel T. Pacheco =

American academic

Manuel Trinidad Pacheco (born May 30, 1941) was president of Laredo State University (1984–1988), the University of Houston–Downtown (1988–1991), the University of Arizona (1991–1997), the University of Missouri System (1997–2002). In retirement, he served as the interim president of his alma mater, New Mexico Highlands University (2006-2007), and two terms as the interim president of New Mexico State University (2009, 2012-2013).

Pacheco was born in Rocky Ford, Colorado. He received a bachelor's degree from New Mexico Highlands University in 1962, a masters in Spanish, and a Ph.D. in foreign language from the Ohio State University in 1962 and 1969, respectively.

Before becoming president at Laredo State University, he was associate dean of the College of Education at The University of Texas at El Paso from 1982 to 1986 and executive director of the Bilingual Education Center at Texas A&I University, now known as Texas A&M University–Kingsville.

During his tenure as president of the University of Missouri System ("MU"), Pacheco recommended to the board of curators that the university system exclude sexual orientation as a protected category in the system's non-discrimination clause. Pacheco stated his desire to only include categories protected by law (at the time, sexual orientation was not). The board accepted the recommendation in 1999, despite protests from students. In October 2003, after Pacheco's retirement, the system added sexual orientation to the clause, making it one of the last in the former "Big 12" to do so. In 1991, Pacheco was elected as a fellow of the National Academy of Public Administration.

Academic offices
Preceded by Alexander F. Schilt	President of the University of Houston–Downtown; 1987–1991	Succeeded by Max Castillo
Preceded by Henry Koffler	President of the University of Arizona; 1991–1997	Succeeded by Peter Likins
Preceded by George A. Russell	President of the University of Missouri System; 1997–2002	Succeeded by Elson Floyd
