= William Wilson Hudson =

American educator (1808–1859)

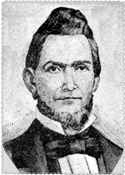
Hudson as President of the University of Missouri

William Wilson Hudson (1808-June 14, 1859) was an American educator and third President of the University of Missouri.

He was born in Orange County, Virginia in 1808 and graduated from Yale University with an A.B. in 1827 and an A.M. in 1830. He was a professor of mathematics and natural philosophy at the University of Alabama before moving to Columbia, Missouri in 1838. After teaching at the University of Missouri for some years, he was elected president of the university in 1856 and served until his death in 1859. He is buried in Columbia at the Columbia Cemetery.

Hudson Hall on the University of Missouri campus is named in honor of him.

== See also ==
- History of the University of Missouri

Academic offices
Preceded by James Shannon	President of the University of Missouri; 1856–1859	Succeeded by Benjamin Blake Minor
