= John Carrier Weaver =

American geographer (1915–1995)

John C. Weaver

John Carrier Weaver (May 21, 1915 – March 10, 1995) was an American professor of geography, and college administrator for several major universities in the United States.

== Early life ==
Weaver was born in Evanston, Illinois. His father, A. T. Weaver, was a professor of speech and theater at the University of Wisconsin–Madison from 1918 to 1961. John Weaver graduated from the University of Wisconsin High School, then received his A.B. (1936), A.M. (1937), and Ph.D. (1942), all in geography, from the University of Wisconsin. He was a member of the Chi Phi Fraternity.

== Military service ==
He was on the staff of the American Geographical Society from 1940 to 1942, was a researcher for the Division of Geography and Cartography of the United States Department of State from 1942 to 1944, and from 1944 to 1946 served as an Arctic intelligence officer in the Navy.

== Research ==
Weaver's PhD provided a statistical analysis of US barley production (published as a paper 1943). While his later work provided a widely used method of defining agricultural regions (1954).

== Career in higher education ==
Weaver taught geography at the University of Minnesota from 1946 to 1955; became dean of the College of Arts and Science at Kansas State University (1955–1957); then dean of the Graduate College at the University of Nebraska (1957–1961), vice president for research, and dean of the Graduate College at the University of Iowa (1961–1964); and vice president for academic affairs at The Ohio State University (1964–1966). From 1966 to 1970, Weaver served as president of the University of Missouri System. In 1970, the regents of the University of Wisconsin elected Weaver president, and he took office in January 1971; when the University of Wisconsin System was created in October 1971, Weaver became its first president. Weaver retired from the UW System in June, 1977, and moved to Los Angeles where he was a Distinguished Professor of Geography at the University of Southern California and the first executive director of the Annenberg Center for the Study of the American Experience. He died in Rancho Palos Verdes, California.

== Selected publications ==
- Weaver, J. C. (1943). Climatic relations of American barley production. Geographical Review, 33(4), 569-588.
- Weaver, J. C. (1954). Crop-combination regions in the Middle West. Geographical Review, 44(2), 175-200.

== Academic Offices ==
Academic offices
Preceded by Elmer Ellis	President of the University of Missouri System; 1966-1970	Succeeded by C. Brice Ratchford
Preceded by Robert Clodius	President of the University of Wisconsin; 1971	Succeeded by None
Preceded by None	President of the University of Wisconsin System; 1971-1977	Succeeded by Hugh Edwin Young
