= Mohammad Dehghani =

US university administrator (born 1955)

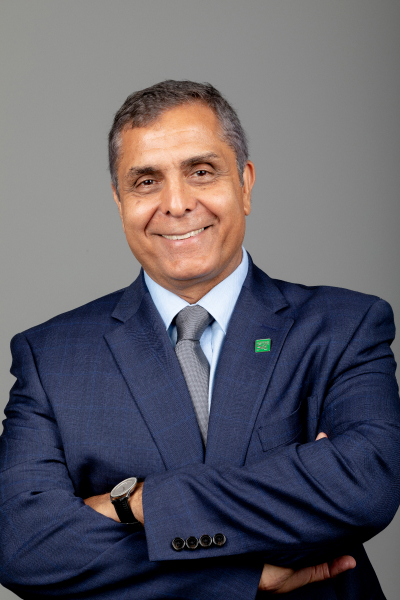
- Dehghani in 2022

9th Chancellor of Missouri University of Science and Technology
- Incumbent
- Assumed office August 1, 2019
- Preceded by: Christopher G. Maples (interim)

Personal details
- Born: July 27, 1955 (age 71) Tehran, Iran
- Education: Louisiana State University (BS, MS, PhD)
- Website: chancellor.mst.edu
- Scientific career
- Fields: Mechanical engineering
- Workplaces: Ohio University; Lawrence Livermore National Laboratory; Johns Hopkins University; Stevens Institute of Technology; Missouri University of Science and Technology
- Thesis: Computer simulation of hydrostatic co-extrusion of bimetallic compounds (1987)
- Doctoral advisor: Craig S. Hartley

Mohammad "Mo" Dehghani (born July 27, 1955) is the current and 9th chancellor of the Missouri University of Science and Technology in Rolla, Missouri, since August 2019. He also serves as president and executive director of the Kummer Institute.

Dehghani formerly served as founding director of the Johns Hopkins University Systems Institute, where he established research and application programs with federal research agencies. In 2013, he joined Stevens Institute of Technology, where he served as vice provost for research, innovation, and entrepreneurship. He became chancellor of Missouri University of Science and Technology, or Missouri S&T, in 2019.

As chancellor at Missouri S&T, Dehghani helped secure a $300 million gift from June and Fred Kummer. This gift, the largest in Missouri higher education history, established the Kummer Institute for Student Success, Research and Economic Development.

== Early life and education ==
Dehghani was born in Tehran, Iran. He immigrated to the United States in 1974. He attended Louisiana State University where he earned a Bachelor of Science (1980), Master of Science (1982), and Ph.D. (1987) in mechanical engineering. While pursuing his Ph.D., Dehghani worked for Ethyl Corporation and Centerpoint, Inc. (1983–1985). He also held a postdoctoral National Science Foundation and American Society of Engineering Education internship at the Massachusetts Institute of Technology (1988).

== Career ==
Dehghani began his academic career at Ohio University (1987–1996).

Dehghani joined Lawrence Livermore National Laboratory in 1996 as a research scientist. He soon became the group leader of the Engineering Systems Design and Fabrication Group, then deputy division leader of the New Technology Division, and ultimately, division leader while also serving as director of External Relations with Academia.

In 2008, Dehghani became professor of mechanical engineering at Johns Hopkins University and associate director for engineering, design, and fabrication at the Johns Hopkins University Applied Physics Laboratory. In 2011, Dehghani established and became the founding director of the Johns Hopkins University Systems Institute.

In 2013, Dehghani joined Stevens Institute of Technology as professor of systems and enterprises and as vice provost for research, innovation, and entrepreneurship. He also served as chair of the Stevens Venture Center Advisory Board and on the board of directors of the Research & Development Council of New Jersey.

== Missouri S&T chancellor, 2019–present ==
On August 1, 2019, Dehghani became the ninth chancellor and 22nd leader of Missouri University of Science and Technology in Rolla, Missouri. Before 1964, heads of the university were titled as director or dean.

Dehghani led Missouri S&T during its 150th anniversary celebrations in 2020–2021 and during the world's COVID-19 pandemic.

In October 2020, the university received the largest single gift to any university, public or private, in the state of Missouri. The $300 million gift from June and Fred Kummer established a new foundation to create the Kummer Institute for Student Success, Research and Economic Development. The gift also established the Kummer College of Innovation, Entrepreneurship, and Economic Development at Missouri S&T, developed new areas for research, provided scholarships and fellowships for students, and bolstered the Rolla region's economy.

== Personal life ==
Dehghani is married to his wife, pharmacologist Mina Saffari. They have a son, Devon. Dehghani has two pets, a Brittany Spaniel and an orange tabby cat. A licensed pilot, he enjoys flying planes and also enjoys fly-fishing.
