= Mel George =

American academic administrator

Melvin D. George (February 13, 1936 – April 25, 2016) was an American educator who was president of St. Olaf College from 1985 to 1994, and twice interim president of the University of Missouri. George was interim president from 1984 to 1985 and again from 1996 to 1997.

He was a native of Washington, D.C., and a graduate of Northwestern University. George came to the University of Missouri in 1960 as a mathematics professor after receiving his doctorate from Princeton University. He died on April 25, 2016, at the age of 80. He was knighted by King Harald V of Norway for his efforts to strengthen and maintain the close relationship between the United States and Norway.
