= Richard Henry Jesse =

American academic administrator (1853–1921)

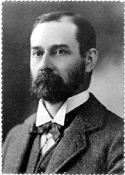
- Jesse in 1891

President of the University of Missouri
- In office July 1, 1891 – 1908
- Preceded by: Samuel Laws
- Succeeded by: Albert Ross Hill

Personal details
- Born: May 1, 1853 Lancaster County, Virginia, US
- Died: January 21, 1921 (aged 67) Columbia, Missouri, US
- Education: University of Virginia

Richard Henry Jesse (May 1, 1853 – January 21, 1921) was an American educator who served as the eighth president of the University of Missouri.

== Biography ==
Jesse was born in Lancaster County, Virginia, on May 1, 1853, to William T. Jesse and Mary Jesse (née Claybrook). From 1873 to 1875, he studied at the University of Virginia, after which he taught French and mathematics at Hanover Academy, which he had attended at a younger age. He then supervised Washington Academy in Princess Anne, Maryland in 1877 and 1878. He married Addie Henry Polk in 1882, who he had met in Maryland. Addie was distantly related to President James K. Polk.

Jesse was part of the University of Louisiana at Lafayette faculty from 1878 to 1884, teaching English, Greek, and Latin, as well as being head of its academic department. He was a senior Latin professor at Tulane University from 1884 to 1891. He believed Tuland and the University of Louisiana should be combined, which happened in 1884.

From July 1, 1891, until his retirement in 1908, Jesse served as president of University of Missouri. In 1901, after his tenth year inauguration, the university's main building burnt down, which led to bids to move the school to a different city. In 1897, he served as chairman of the National Education Association. Following his retirement, he continued writing and lecturing. He died on January 21, 1921, aged 67, from status epilepticus, in his home in Columbia, Missouri. He is buried at the Columbia Cemetery. Jesse Hall is named for him, and he is an honorary member of the Acacia Fraternity. His papers are held by the State Historical Society of Missouri.

Academic offices
Preceded by Samuel Laws	President of the University of Missouri; 1891–1908	Succeeded by Albert Ross Hill
