= Daniel Read (academic) =

American educator and president of the University of Missouri

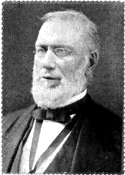

Daniel Read (June 24, 1805 – October 3, 1878) was an American educator and the sixth president of the University of Missouri in Columbia, Missouri.

== Biography ==
Daniel Read was born near Marietta, Ohio and completed his education at Ohio University. Next, he studied law and despite being admitted to the bar, he accepted a position as professor at Ohio University in 1825, where he later served as vice-president. Read was a professor of ancient languages at Indiana University from 1843 to 1856. In 1851, he participated in Indiana's Constitutional Convention. He moved to the University of Wisconsin in 1856 and was a professor there until 1866.

Read became president of the University of Missouri in 1867, following the death of John Hiram Lathrop. He was the first to petition the Missouri General Assembly for funding. Read established the College of Education and opened the university to women. He was the first president to live in the president's residence on the David R. Francis Quadrangle. His wife, Alice Brice Read, died in the residence in 1874.

Read resigned from the presidency as of July 1876. He died in 1878 near Keokuk, Iowa.

Academic offices
Preceded by John Hiram Lathrop	President of the University of Missouri; 1866-1876	Succeeded by Samuel Laws
