= Cheryl B. Schrader =

American academic

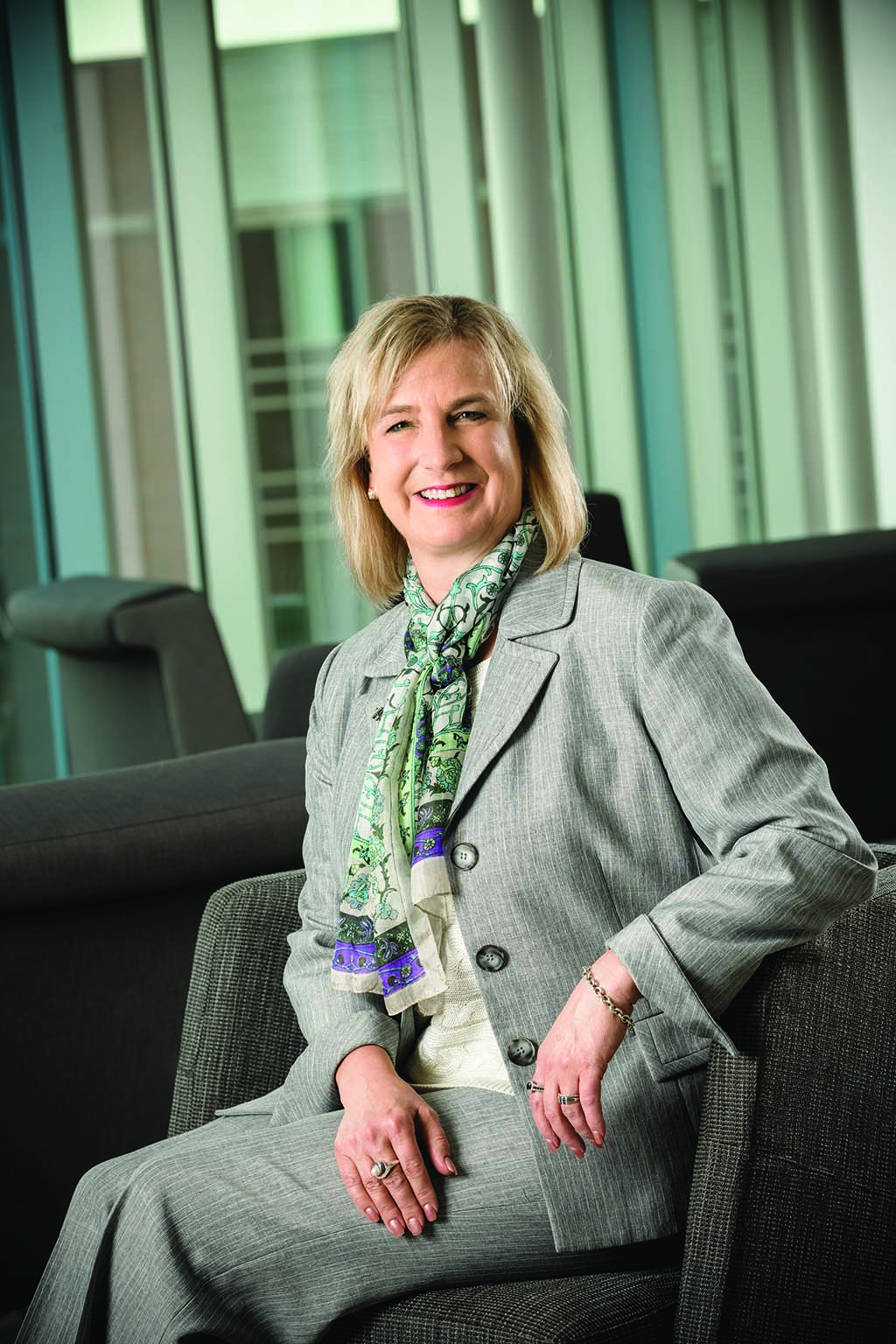

7th President of Wright State University
- In office July 1, 2017 – December 31, 2019
- Preceded by: David R. Hopkins
- Succeeded by: Susan Edwards

20th Chancellor of Missouri University of Science and Technology
- In office April 2012 – May 2017
- Preceded by: John F. Carney
- Succeeded by: Mohammad Dehghani

Personal details
- Born: 1962 or 1963 (age 63–64)
- Spouse: Jeff Schrader
- Children: 2
- Education: Valparaiso University; University of Notre Dame

Cheryl B. Schrader (born 1962 or 1963) is an American educator and former academic administrator. She began her presidency of Wright State University on July 1, 2017, and stepped down from the position December 31, 2019, midway through her five-year appointment. She was previously the chancellor of Missouri University of Science and Technology.

== Early life and education ==
Schrader received a bachelor's degree in electrical engineering with a concentration in computers and communications from Valparaiso University in 1984, and master's and doctorate degrees in electrical engineering from the University of Notre Dame in 1987 and 1991.

== Career ==
Schrader began her teaching and academic career at Notre Dame during the early 1980s. She worked as a summer engineering intern for McDonnell Douglas Astronautics in 1982, 1983, and 1984. (Note: Her biography at MS&T also mentions "consulting work" with McDonnell Douglas.) During the early 1990s, she also consulted for Chimera Research while continuing to teach at Notre Dame. After briefly teaching at Rice University during 1991, she became a tenured professor at the University of Texas at San Antonio and served as associate dean. She was president of the IEEE Control Systems Society in 2003, and had served as the program chair of the 39th IEEE Conference on Decision and Control held in December 2000. In 2005, she became professor and dean of the College of Engineering at Boise State University. In January 2011, she left the dean position and became associate vice president for strategic research initiatives in Boise State's Division of Research and Economic Development. In 2012, she took the position of chancellor at Missouri University of Science and Technology, which she held until her Wright State University presidency was announced in 2017.

== Awards and honors ==
In 2005, Schrader received the Presidential Award for Excellence in Science, Mathematics, and Engineering Mentoring from the White House. She was honored as one of the 2005 "Idaho Women Making History" by the Gender Equity Center at Boise State University. She received the IEEE Education Society Hewlett-Packard/Harriett B. Rigas Award in 2008. For 2014, she was selected as an IEEE Fellow "for leadership and contributions in engineering education."

== Federal investigation ==
On May 21, 2014, during Schrader's tenure as chancellor of Missouri S&T, the U.S. Department of Education launched a probe of the university for potential Title IX violations over their handling of sexual violence cases. Missouri S&T was the only Missouri institution investigated at the time, and (as of 2019) remains the only public university in Missouri under investigation. The case remained open when Schrader left the university in 2017. Criticism of her leadership at Missouri S&T led to an effort to hold a vote of no confidence against her, which she acknowledged after accepting the Wright State presidency. It was reported that the Wright State University board of trustees was unaware that Schrader had "stared down a no-confidence effort" when she was hired, although the board chairman said he was "not concerned".

== Wright State University presidency ==
Schrader entered the position of President of Wright State on July 1, 2017, after a time of financial and political turmoil at the school. Years of overspending had drained the reserve funds. The university budget had already been cut by some $30 million by the board of trustees and the interim president before her arrival. According to Schrader, "the bulk of the budget cuts were supposed to have been completed" before she took over, but she faced further financial problems. By the end of her first year, she had implemented close to another $20 million more in cuts while producing a "projected" surplus of some $7 million, the first operating surplus since 2012. This earned her praise in her first annual review. However, controversy arose when the university released a statement implying she had declined to accept an annual raise or bonus, when in fact neither had been offered. The budget modifications did ultimately avoid a state fiscal watch, which had been considered likely in 2017 when she became president.

Schrader's approach to the university budget, as well as her general leadership during the first year were not without criticism. One member of the Wright State University Board of Trustees called her proposed 2019 fiscal year budget "a recipe for disaster." Schrader's strategic plan for the university, which had been specifically requested to be "different than anybody would see at another university," received criticism for being "overly broad" and "generic."

Relations between the administration and faculty, which were already strained by the financial difficulties, deteriorated early in Schrader's presidency. Members of the Wright State Chapter of the American Association of University Professors (AAUP) were particularly strident in their criticism of the handling of the budget. In November 2017, the Wright State AAUP chapter president remarked that the relationship with the administration was no longer "cordial." A major issue was the employment contract: the faculty had been working without one since June 2017. The union argued that the austerity measures in the contract being imposed by the administration were harmful to the students and to the educational mission of the institution, and that the faculty was being forced to bear a disproportionate burden of the financial crisis even though it had been brought by the administration. Tensions publicly erupted after a closed-door negotiating session in January 2018 when hundreds of faculty and students marched across campus to an open budget forum hosted by Schrader. More protests followed. At a February demonstration, a professor characterized the budget modifications as a "budget-cutting spree" that protects "extreme salaries and bloat of the upper administration" and "slashes" the core mission of the university. Some students also expressed concern about the impact the cuts would have on their studies.

=== Faculty contract dispute ===
Frustration mounted as the university entered the second fiscal year under Schrader's leadership without a faculty contract, even though both the administration and the faculty union acknowledged that the contract dispute was only one of many problems the university was facing. The administration insisted that the austerity measures in the contract were necessary, but the faculty union argued that the employment terms took power from the faculty and gave it to the administration, particularly in the areas of workload and imposed furloughs. Another issue was the right to collective bargaining, specifically, over health care. The faculty union also said that the reduction in benefits would amount to a nine percent pay cut. Talk of a strike, which had begun in January 2017 became more earnest in July. The faculty union maintained it would only strike if the president and board tried to "impose a contract that would damage education at Wright State."

The blame for the contract dispute shifted from the board of trustees and the former Wright State president to Schrader herself. Several hundred faculty protested the stalled contract negotiations at the October 19 meeting of the Wright State Board of Trustees. In November, some faculty members called for an expedited vote of "no-confidence" on Schrader. The faculty senate, however, voted against proceeding. The board president supported Schrader in the face of the no-confidence vote, while the faculty senate president said "morale is the lowest I can remember it being" after the senate's decision. A decline in morale among adjunct faculty was also indicated.

On January 4, 2019, the trustees voted to implement a "last, best offer" it had extended and the faculty union had rejected in November 2018, effectively imposing the rejected contract onto the faculty. In response, the faculty union announced a plan to strike on January 22. In a January 6 statement, Schrader described the employment terms as "fair" and said "we can return to the bargaining table when the university is back on solid financial footing." As the strike date drew closer, the faculty union maintained its willingness to negotiate and avoid a strike, and blamed Schrader personally for the impasse. Schrader stood firm in her support of the employment terms and the board of trustees. In a January 17 statement, Schrader said that renegotiation of the expired contract was "not possible." The faculty union argued that continuing to work under the imposed terms was tantamount to accepting the imposed contract, which would diminish the future bargaining power of the faculty union.

=== Faculty strike ===
On January 22, 2019, following almost two years of failed contract negotiations and an unexpected imposition of employment conditions by the administration, the Wright State chapter of the American Association of University Professors began a strike that would ultimately become the second-longest public university strike in U.S. history. The strike received national attention.

On February 10, day 20 of the strike, after a long weekend of negotiating, the faculty union and the administration negotiators reached a tentative agreement to end the strike. The faculty returned to work on Monday February 11. "Both parties made substantial concessions to help move the university forward together," Schrader said. The faculty union admitted it made some "serious financial concessions," such as agreeing to no pay raises until 2021, but kept protections on job security, workload, merit pay, and perhaps most significantly, the right to bargain over health care. On the whole, the faculty union hailed the agreement and considered the strike a success.

== Personal life ==
Schrader is married to practicing attorney Jeff Schrader, who served as chief legal counsel for the Idaho State Board of Education. They have two children.
