= George A. Russell =

George Albert Russell II (July 12, 1921 – December 27, 2016) was an American academic administrator, who was a president of the University of Missouri System from 1991 to 1997.

Russell was born in Bertrand, Missouri. He was a 1938 graduate of Sikeston High School. He served in the Navy from 1940 to 1960 and retired as a commander. During his time in the Navy he received his bachelor's degree from The University of Pennsylvania, a Masters from MIT Massachusetts Institute of Technology, and his Doctorate Degree from the University of Illinois.

After 20 years of service with the Navy he retired and began a second career teaching physics at the University of Illinois, he later became the Dean of the Graduate College for Research and Development. In 1977 he was named Chancellor of the University of Missouri-Kansas City, a position he held until being named president of the University of Missouri System in 1991 (at the age of 70). He died on December 27, 2016, in Kansas City, Missouri.

Academic offices
Preceded by James C. Olson	President of the University of Missouri System; 1991-1996	Succeeded by Manuel T. Pacheco
