= Albert Ross Hill =

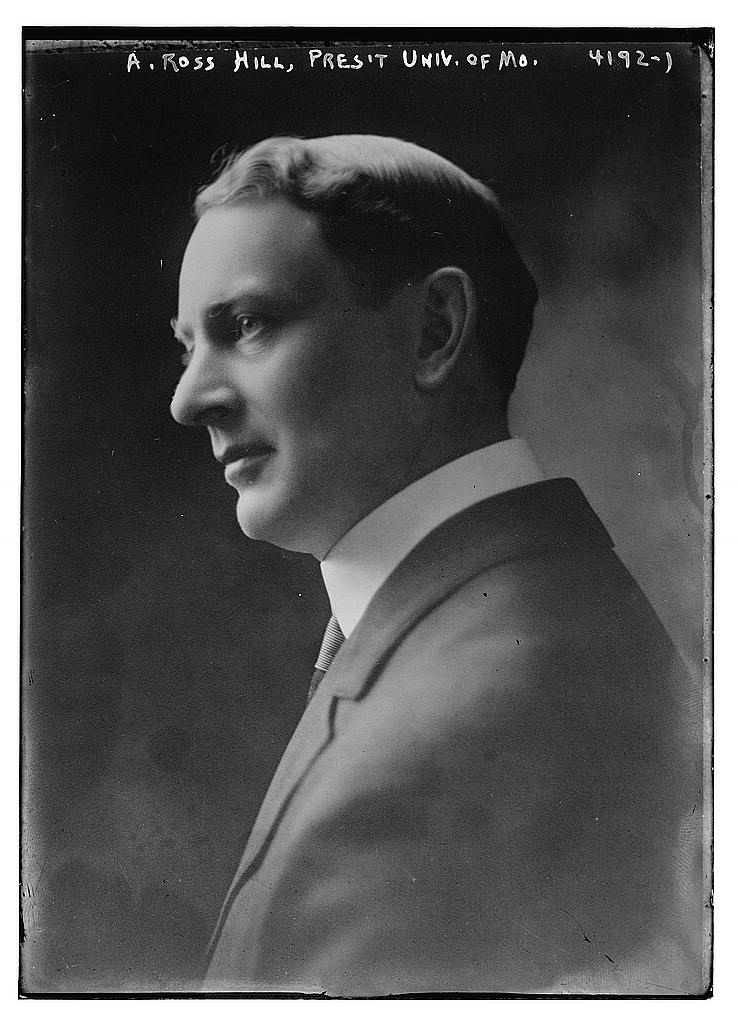
Albert Ross Hill in 1917

Albert Ross Hill (October 4, 1868 – May 6, 1943) was a Canadian-born American educator and ninth president of the University of Missouri in Columbia, Missouri. He was also Commissioner of the European Division of the American Red Cross (1921–1923).

== Biography ==
Born in rural Colchester County, Nova Scotia, Hill held degrees from Dalhousie University and Cornell University and for a short time taught at the University of Nebraska. He was married to Agnes Baxter, also a graduate of Dalhousie and Cornell. At the age of 38 years he was one of the youngest Presidents ever of the University of Missouri. During his time as president (1908–1921) the world's first Journalism school, the Missouri School of Journalism was established. The School of Commerce and the Department of Economics were also established during this time.

In his only attempt to seek political office, Hill ran unsuccessfully for Mayor of Kansas City in the notorious 1934 municipal election during the latter days of the Pendergast era. The Kansas City Times said after the election, "it was learned after the vote frauds were uncovered that he would have been elected if the election had been honest." Hill Hall on David R. Francis Quadrangle is named in honor of Albert Hill. He was a founding member of the Zeta Chapter of Phi Mu Alpha Sinfonia.

Hill died on May 6, 1943.

== Gallery ==
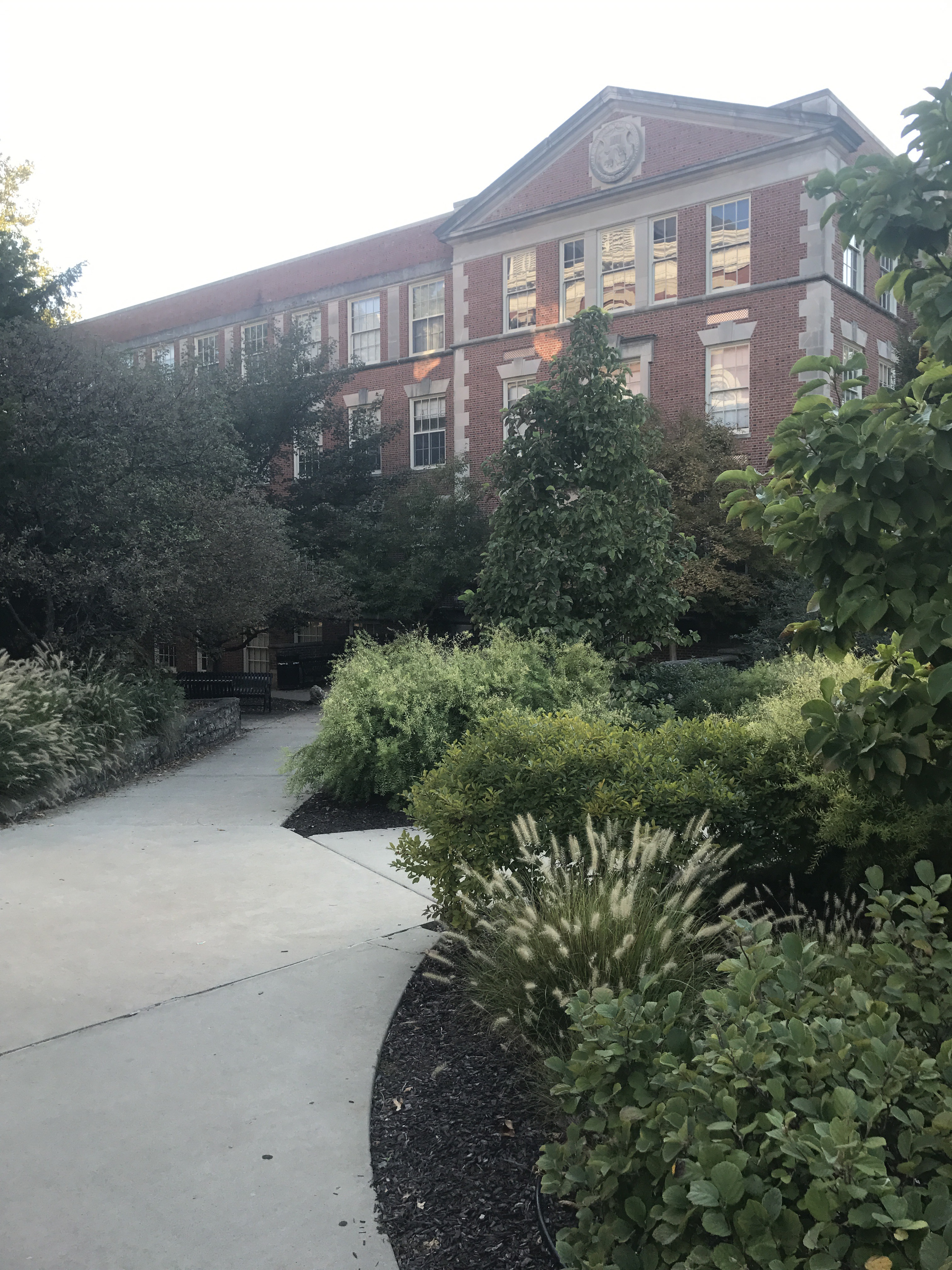
Hill Hall on the University of Missouri campus

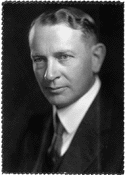
Hill in 1908

== See also ==
- History of the University of Missouri

Academic offices
Preceded by Richard Henry Jesse	President of the University of Missouri; 1908–1921	Succeeded by John Carleton Jones
