= Elmer Ellis =

American educator and university administrator

Elmer Ellis (July 27, 1901 – August 27, 1989) was an American educator and thirteenth president of the University of Missouri from 1955 to 1966, and first president of the University of Missouri System. He was instrumental in the expansion of the university to include the University of Missouri–Kansas City and University of Missouri–St. Louis. Ellis Library was named in his honor.

== Early life and education ==
Elmer Ellis was born in Anamoose, North Dakota, to Thomas Ellis and Lillie Butterfield. He attended high school in Towner, North Dakota, graduating in the spring of 1920. During his sophomore year of high school he met Ruth Clapper, and by his senior year they were engaged to be married. After working as a farmhand during the summer, he enrolled at Fargo College for the fall 1920 semester. He spent one year at Fargo University, after which he began teaching two classes at a primary school in Bottineau County, North Dakota. Ellis attended the University of North Dakota, where he earned his bachelor of arts in 1924 and his master of arts in 1925. After a five year engagement, Ellis and Ruth married on August 14, 1925, in Fargo. After graduating from the University of North Dakota, Ellis taught as a history professor at the North Dakota State Teachers College from 1925 to 1928. He enrolled at the University of Iowa in 1928 and taught in the history department until he graduated with his Ph.D. in 1930.

== University of Missouri ==
Ellis was offered a position as an assistant professor of history by the University of Missouri in 1929. He accepted this position in 1930, and in June 1930, he and Ruth moved to Columbia, Missouri. Ellis worked in this position until 1932 when he was promoted to an associate professor to which he held until 1945. In 1945 he was named the dean of the College of Liberal Arts and Sciences. Ellis took a sabbatical in 1951, and with a teaching grant through the Fulbright Program, he and Ruth moved to the Netherlands where Ellis taught for a year in the American Institute at the University of Amsterdam. In 1955, Ellis was appointed as the temporary president of the University of Missouri, and after seven months, he formally accepted the position. Prior to this promotion he served on the Department of the Army Historical Advisory Committee from 1954 to 1956. Shortly after he became the university president, he began work as the co-chairman on the Missouri Committee on Education Beyond High School. The committee suggested that the state government should establish a permanent statewide commission on higher education and a program to provide state aid to junior colleges.

Ellis was instrumental in the creation of the University of Missouri System, which was established in 1963. Prior to its creation, Ellis lobbied Missouri Governor John M. Dalton, working closely with the Missouri School of Mines, the University of Kansas City, and the city of St. Louis, Missouri, to establish the four-campus system. Ellis served as the first president of the UM System, serving from 1963 until his retirement in 1966.

== Later life ==
After Ellis' retirement in 1966, he was asked to provide consultation at the University of Valle in Cali, Colombia, to which he provided for six months. He served on the Stephens College Board of Curators, the Boone National Savings and Loan Association Board, as chairman of the Truman Library Board, and on the State Historical Society of Missouri Executive Committee. Ellis died on August 27, 1989.

== Bibliography ==
- Mr. Dooley's America: A Life of Finley Peter Dunne (1941)
- Henry Teller Moore: Defender of the West (1941)
- Ellis, Elmer (1989). My Road to Emeritus. Columbia, Missouri: State Historical Society of Missouri. ISBN 0962289116.

== See also ==
- History of the University of Missouri

Academic offices
| Preceded by Frederick Middlebush | President of the University of Missouri; 1955–1963 | Succeeded by John W. Schwada |
| New title First president | President of the University of Missouri System; 1963-1966 | Succeeded by John Carrier Weaver |
