= James C. Olson =

James C. Olson (Bradgate, Iowa, 1917 – August 17, 2005) was an American historian, educator and school administrator; he was president of the University of Missouri System. He had been a vice chancellor at the University of Nebraska and chancellor at University of Missouri-Kansas City.

With a doctorate from the University of Nebraska, he served during World War II as a historian for the United States Army Air Forces. Afterward he served for a decade as director of the Nebraska State Historical Society. He also taught at the University of Nebraska, publishing books on the state's history.

== Early life ==
James Olson was born in Bradgate, Iowa. He received a bachelor's degree from Morningside College in 1938 and an MA and PhD from the University of Nebraska in 1939 and 1942. During World War II he was a historian for the United States Army Air Forces.

== Nebraska ==
After the war Olson directed the Nebraska State Historical Society from 1946 to 1956. He taught at the University of Nebraska where he became chair of the Department of History, dean of the Graduate College, director of Graduate Program Development, and vice chancellor for Graduate Studies and Research. During this time he wrote several books on Nebraska history.

== Missouri ==
In 1968 he became chancellor of the University of Missouri-Kansas City, serving until 1976. He became president of the University of Missouri System until 1984.

== Books ==
- J. Sterling Morton (1942)
- History of Nebraska (1955) ISBN 0-8032-8605-8
- Red Cloud and the Sioux Problem (1965) ISBN 0-8032-5817-8
- Nebraska Is My Home (1965)
- This Is Nebraska (1968)
- Olson, James and Vera (1988). The University of Missouri An Illustrated History. Columbia, Missouri: University of Missouri Press. ISBN 9780826206787.
- Blood on the Moon: Valentine McGillycuddy and the Sioux (1990) ISBN 0-8032-8170-6
- Serving the University of Missouri: A Memoir of Campus and System Administration (1993) ISBN 0-8262-0924-6
- St. Louis Woman (1999) ISBN 0-8262-1237-9
- Stuart Symington: A Life (2003) ISBN 0-8262-1503-3

Academic offices
Preceded by C. Brice Ratchford	President of the University of Missouri System; 1976–1984	Succeeded by C. Peter Magrath
