= History of the University of Missouri =

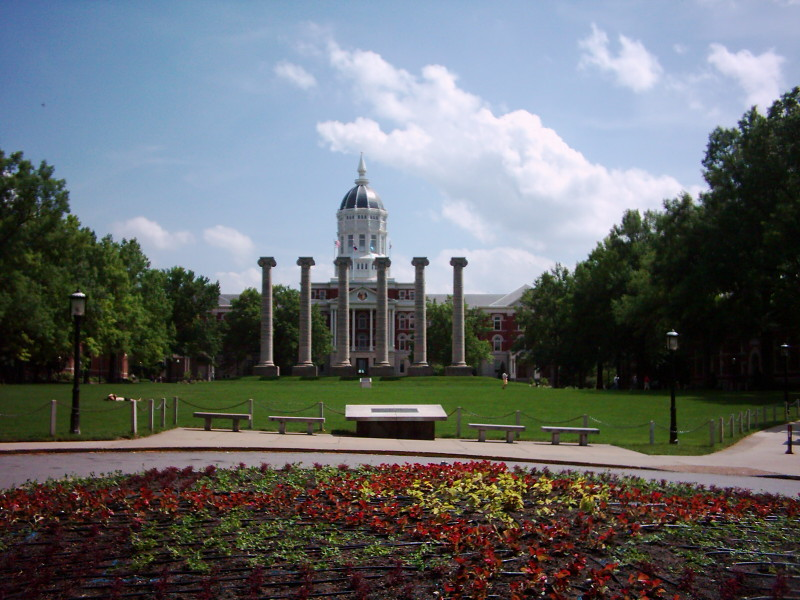
Francis Quadrangle, featuring the Columns and Jesse Hall.

The University of Missouri in Columbia, Missouri, was established in 1839. This later expanded to the statewide University of Missouri System.

== Founding and early years ==
MU was founded in 1839 as part of the Geyer Act to establish a state land-grant university, the first west of the Mississippi River. The year of its founding the citizens of Columbia and Boone County pledged $117,921 in cash and land to beat out five other mid-Missouri counties for the location of the state university. The land on which the university was eventually constructed was just south of Columbia's downtown and owned by James S. Rollins, who is known as the "father of the university." It was the first university in Thomas Jefferson's Louisiana Purchase and was designed in part upon Thomas Jefferson's original plans for the University of Virginia. Because of this, the original tombstone of Thomas Jefferson was given to MU by Jefferson's heirs in July 1883.

In 1849 the first courses in civil engineering west of the Mississippi River were taught at MU. The first department of art was named after the famous Missouri artist George Caleb Bingham. The College of Education was opened in 1867 and admitted the first female students in 1868. The entire university was open to female enrollment by 1871.

In 1862 while in the midst of the Civil War, the board of curators suspended operations for the university. Academic Hall was occupied by Union troops, the president's house was used by Federal officers and the normal school, forerunner to the College of Education, became an army hospital. It was during this time that the residents of Columbia and defenders of the city became notoriously known as the "fighting tigers of Columbia" due to their insistent fighting to keep the Confederate bushwackers away from the city and university.

In 1890 one alumnus suggested the university's newly formed football team be called the "Tigers" out of respect for those who fought to defend Columbia.

== Early growth ==
The most dramatic change occurred in 1870 when the School of Agriculture and Mechanical Arts was established as part of the Morrill Land-Grant Acts which gave the college an endowment of 330,000 acres (133,546.26 ha; 515.62 sq mi) of federal land to "teach such branches of learning as are related to agriculture and the mechanic arts, in such manner as the legislatures of the States may respectively prescribe, in order to promote the liberal and practical education of the industrial classes in the several pursuits and professions in life." The land grant was based on 30,000 acres for each of Missouri's 2 senators and 9 state representatives at the time.

There was an intense debate in the state on whether to use the endowment for the existing school or build a new school elsewhere (notably Springfield, Missouri). Rollins prevailed in establishing the school in the Columbia and while at the same time establishing an off-site department called the Missouri School of Mines and Metallurgy at Rolla, Missouri in the Southeast Missouri Lead District that reported to Columbia where The College of Agriculture, Food, and Natural Resources was established. The Rolla campus (which had offered a higher bid than Iron County, Missouri) would remain a department reporting to Columbia until 1964 when the University of Missouri System was established.

In 1888 the Missouri Agricultural Experiment Station opened. This grew to encompass ten centers and research farms around Mid-Missouri. MU soon added schools of law and medicine.

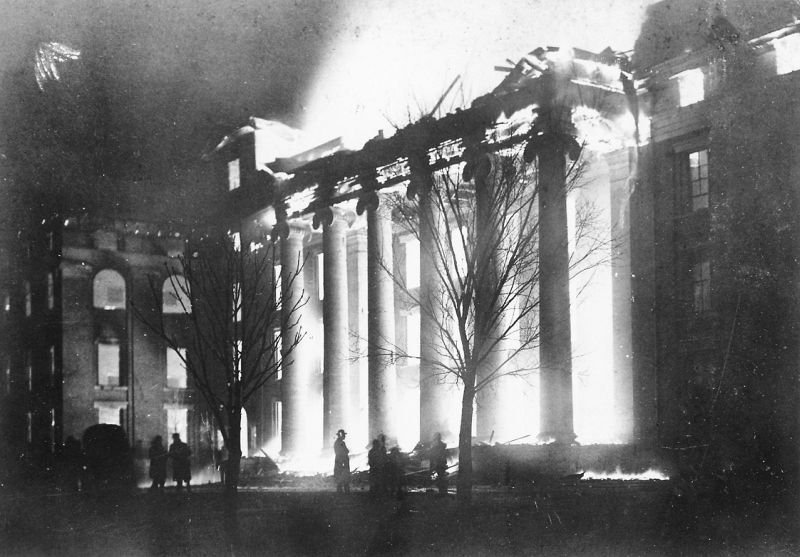
The burning of Academic Hall

On January 9, 1892, Academic Hall, the institution's main building, fell victim to a disastrous fire rumored to have been caused by the first electric light bulb west of the Mississippi River. The fire completely gutted the building, leaving little more than six stone Ionic columns standing. After the fire, there was a campaign to move the university to Sedalia, however the town of Columbia was able to rally against the move. But as a token of gratitude, Sedalia received the rights to host the Missouri State Fair in exchange. The columns, which still stand today, became a symbol of the campus and form the center of Francis Quadrangle, the oldest part of campus. Also in the quadrangle, and often referred to as its centerpiece, is Jesse Hall. Built in 1895, Jesse Hall was formerly known as New Academic Hall. Today, Jesse Hall is home to many administrative offices of the university and to Jesse Auditorium. The area of campus around the quadrangle, where the buildings are built of red brick, is known as "red campus." East of the quadrangle, many buildings were built in 1913 and 1914 of white limestone. This section is known as "white campus."

== Early 20th century ==
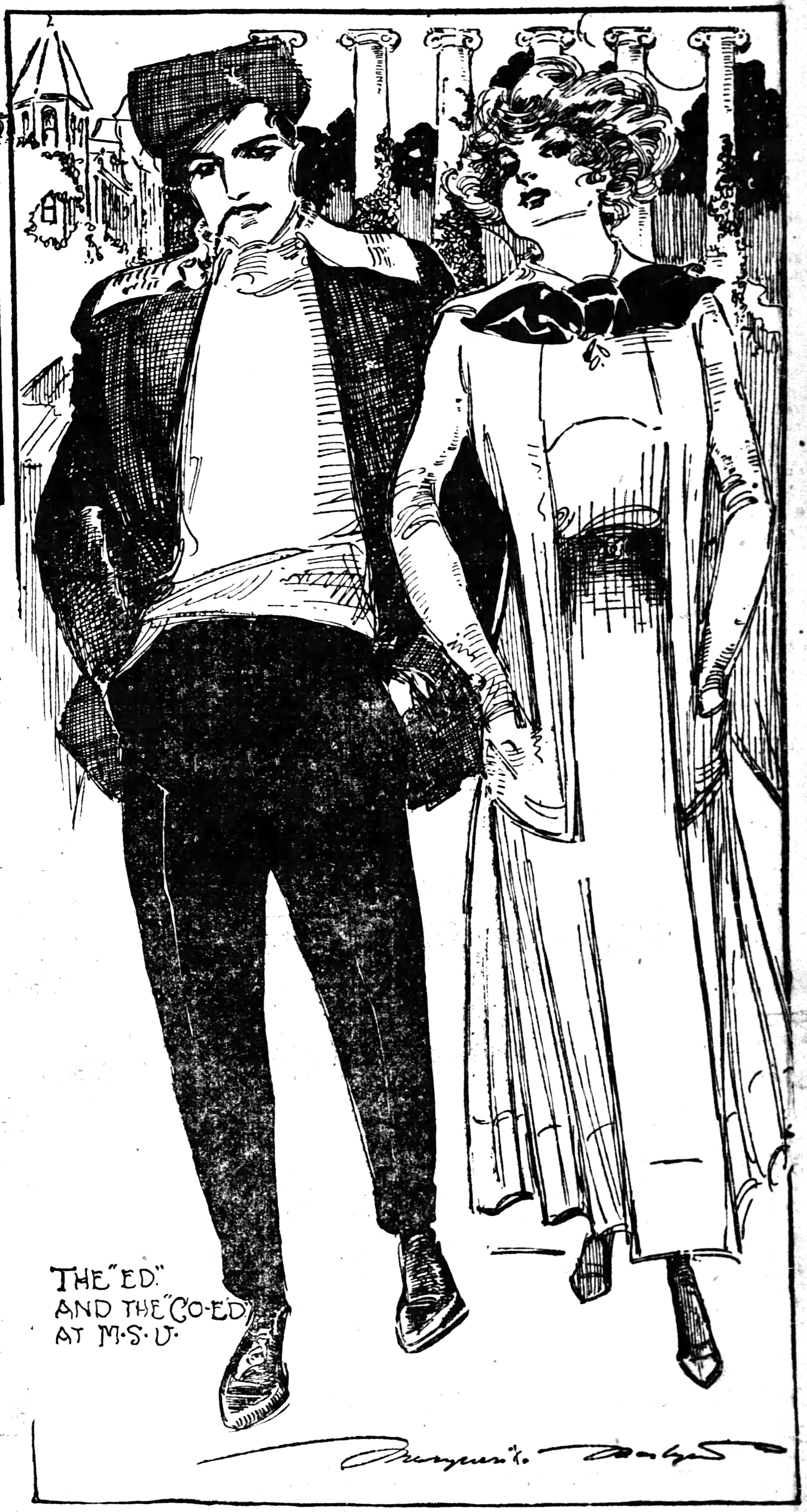
Journalist Marguerite Martyn visited the campus in 1910 and sketched these two fashionable students with the architectural columns behind them. At that time, the campus was known as Missouri State University.

In 1908 the world's first journalism school was opened at MU. It became notable for its "Missouri Method" of teaching. In 1911, MU held the first Homecoming at the football game between MU and the University of Kansas. The University of Missouri School of Music was founded in 1917 as the Department of Music. After World War II universities around the country grew at an extraordinary pace and MU was no exception. This was due, in part, to the G.I. Bill which allowed veterans to attend college with the assistance of the federal government. It was also during this time that the nickname "Mizzou" was first used.

The usage of the term "Mizzou" was first recorded in a campus yell that used the phrase "Mizzou, Rah, Rah." The commonly accepted origin is that the word is a shortened version of the university's (then-known as the Missouri State University) initials, MSU. When said quickly the initials can be morphed into the affectionate nickname: Mizzou. The name stuck and now is commonly used interchangeably among students, alumni and the residents of Columbia with the newer initials, MU.

== From segregation to integration ==
In 1935, four graduates of Lincoln University—a traditionally black school about 30 miles (50 km) away in Jefferson City, Missouri—were denied admission to MU's graduate school. One of the students, Lloyd L. Gaines, brought his case to the United States Supreme Court. On December 12, 1938, in the landmark 6–2 decision, Missouri ex rel. Gaines v. Canada, the court ordered the state of Missouri to admit Gaines to MU's law school or provide a facility of equal stature. Gaines, however, disappeared in Chicago on March 19, 1939, under mysterious circumstances. The university granted Gaines a posthumous honorary law degree in May 2006.

Undergraduate divisions were integrated by court order in 1950, when the university was compelled to admit African Americans to courses that were not offered at Lincoln University.

== Modern Mizzou ==
In 1962, the University of Missouri became the "University of Missouri–Columbia," the flagship campus of the newly created University of Missouri System, with additional campuses in Rolla, Kansas City, and St. Louis. Today the Columbia campus ranks number one among institutions in the Association of American Universities for growth in federally funded research over the last ten years. Mizzou is a member of the Southeastern Conference and is the only school in the state with all of its sports in the NCAA Division I-A, the nations highest level of college sports. MU has over a quarter million living alumni worldwide.

In 1970, students upset with the killing of four students at Kent State University stormed Chancellor Schwada's office and, for a short time, took over campus. Classes were dismissed and staff were sent home. It was around this same time that Peace Park was dedicated near the journalism school as a permanent monument for the promotion of peace and remembrance.

In 1978, Barbara Uehling became MU's third chancellor and the first woman to lead a major state university in the country.

Following the 2015 University of Missouri protests, the chancellor and System president resigned, amid racial complaints by students.

== Presidents and chancellors ==
Each campus of the University of Missouri System is led by a chancellor, who reports to the president of the UM System. Prior to the formation of the system in 1963, the Columbia campus and its offshoot in Rolla were led directly by the president and the position of chancellor did not exist. See List of presidents of the University of Missouri System for a list of presidents from 1963–present. This list does not include interim presidents or chancellors. John Lathrop is the only president or chancellor to have served separate terms.

For a complete list of leaders for the Columbia campus, please see List of chancellors of the University of Missouri'.

For a complete list of leaders for the University of Missouri System, please see List of presidents of the University of Missouri System.
