= David Cingranelli =

- Occupation: Political Scientist

David Cingranelli is a professor of Political Science at Binghamton University. He received his Ph.D. from the University of Pennsylvania in 1977. He conducts global, comparative, econometric research examining the causes and consequences of variation in government respect for various human rights. His 2007 book with Rodwan Abouharb, Human Rights and Structural Adjustment, demonstrated the negative human rights impacts of World Bank and IMF program lending in developing countries. His current research examines how constitutional design and other factors can provide incentives to politicians to enact policies protecting human rights including labor rights. He is a former president of the Human Rights Section of the American Political Science Association. Until 2013, he served as the co-director of the Cingranelli and Richards (CIRI) Human Rights Data Project.

== Publications ==
- Ethics and American Foreign Policy Toward the Third World (1993)
- Human Rights and Developing Countries (1996)
- Human Rights and Structural Adjustment with M. Rodwan Abouharb (2007)
