= Pipe Dream (newspaper) =

Student newspaper of Binghamton University in Vestal, New York

- The Summer 2010 front page of Pipe Dream
- Type: Newspaper: print: weekly, Tues.; online: bi-weekly/daily
- Format: Broadsheet
- School: Binghamton University
- Owner: Pipe Dream Student Group
- Founded: 1946
- Headquarters: Vestal, New York, U.S.
- Circulation: 7,000 on and off campus
- Website: bupipedream.com

Pipe Dream is the student newspaper of Binghamton University (State University of New York at Binghamton) in Vestal, N.Y. Content is published online throughout the week at bupipedream.com, as well as in print every Tuesday.

Printed as a tabloid until spring 2012, Pipe Dream now prints as a broadsheet paper with full-color front and back pages.

Pipe Dream is one of the few student newspapers in the country that is and always has been entirely student-run, without the supervision or assistance of an advisor. Though there is no journalism school at Binghamton University, Pipe Dream was named in 2010 as one of the nation's top college newspapers by the Princeton Review.

== History: The Free Word on Campus ==
Pipe Dream was first published in the form of The Colonial News on November 22, 1946, the same year as the founding of Triple Cities Colleges, the forebear of Binghamton University. The Colonial News' first editors wrote:

This is a new paper in a new college. It is up to you, all of you, to insure its success. It will reflect your views and opinions, those of the aggregate student body. Primarily as a news organ it will reflect your achievements—and your failures.

The paper's name was changed to Pipe Dream in 1970 in protest of the Vietnam War.

Pipe Dream printed a bi-weekly paper until the onset of the COVID-19 pandemic in spring 2020, officially becoming a weekly newspaper in spring 2023.

== Circulation ==
The newspaper is distributed at Binghamton University's main campus in Vestal, New York, including a single spot in Downtown Binghamton, the newly built University Downtown Center. All copies are distributed openly and are free to the public.

== Format ==
Pipe Dream regularly prints the following sections:

- News: Updates on the latest in campus, local and national news from student journalists. Notably includes Police Watch which details incidents of alleged illegal incidents on campus as filed by campus police.
- Arts & Culture: Arts and entertainment section which features stories about events on- and off-campus and about popular culture at large.
- Opinion: Oriented towards campus affairs, national and global politics, as well as broader issues of campus life and humor.
- Weekend Warriors: Full color two-page photographic spread in the center of the paper which displays on and off-campus student events and activities.
- Fun Page: General comic and humor section including original comics and memes by Binghamton students, alumni, and syndicated artists, as well as sudoku and crossword puzzles.
- Sports: Game coverage and opinion stories on the Division I Binghamton Bearcats. Professional and national sports issues are also covered. As is typical of tabloid formats, the back page is dedicated to the sports section.

Pipe Dream also publishes special issues for finals week, summer orientation, the annual Spring Fling celebration, and the NCAA America East Men's Basketball Tournament, among others.

== Alumni ==
Alumni editors and correspondents of Pipe Dream have worked for and are currently working for some of the nation's top media outlets, including the four major New York papers: The New York Times, New York Post, New York Daily News and Newsday.

Tony Kornheiser, '70, now a famous ESPN personality, was once The Colonial News' sports editor.
Chris Giarrusso, '97, illustrator of Marvel Comics' Mini Marvels series is a former Fun Page Editor.
Kerry Kantin, Editor 1997-1999, went on to become a Vice President at S&P Global Markets.
Robert Greenberger, '80, is an American writer and editor known for his work on Comics Scene, Starlog, Weekly World News, and Hellboy II, and for the executive positions he held at both Marvel Comics and DC Comics.

== Awards ==
2014
Associated Collegiate Press Associated Collegiate Press Design of the Year - 3rd place for Newspaper Page/Spread

2013
Associated Collegiate Press Associated Collegiate Press Design of the Year - 2nd place for Newspaper Page/Spread

2012
Associated Collegiate Press National College Newspaper Convention - 4th Place for Four-Year Weekly Broadsheet

2010
Princeton Review Best College Newspapers - ranked No. 20 in the nation

2009
Associated Collegiate Press National College Newspaper Convention - 4th Place for Four-Year Weekly Tabloid
2008
Associated Collegiate Press National College Newspaper Convention - 4th Place for Four-Year Weekly Tabloid
2007
Associated Collegiate Press National College Newspaper Convention - Honorable Mention for Four-Year Weekly Tabloid

2006
Binghamton University XCELSIOR Award - Media Organization of the Year

== Fred Handte Memorial Award ==
Established in 1988 in memory of Fred Handte, 1987 editor-in-chief of the student newspaper Pipe Dream. This award is given to a junior or senior involved with Pipe Dream.

== Criticism ==
In 2005, Pipe Bomb, Pipe Dream's annual April Fool's edition, ran a joke story about a fictitious campus van service that parodied "Safe Ride," a free late-night shuttle on campus. Activists stole most of the issues soon after the papers hit newsstands and demanded that the Binghamton University administration either force Pipe Dream's editors to undergo sensitivity training or revoke the group's Student Association-chartered status. (Without S.A.-chartered status, Pipe Dream would have no longer been an officially sanctioned student group, possibly leading to it being evicted from its campus office space and having to pay its own media insurance premiums.) In the end, no action was taken.
