= Lois B. DeFleur =

American professor and university president

5th President of Binghamton University
- In office August 15, 1990 – June 30, 2010
- Preceded by: Clifford D. Clark
- Succeeded by: C. Peter Magrath

Personal details
- Born: June 25, 1936 (age 90) Illinois, U.S.
- Education: University of Illinois (PhD)

Lois B. DeFleur (born June 25, 1936) is an American academic who was president of Binghamton University from 1990 to 2010. She came to the university after being provost at the University of Missouri. Before that she had served as a professor of sociology at Missouri State University and Washington State University.

DeFleur graduated from Blackburn College in Illinois. She received a Master of Arts degree from Indiana University and a doctorate in sociology from the University of Illinois. She studied juvenile delinquency in Latin America and has done extensive work in the fields of deviant behavior and occupational socialization.

DeFleur became the president at Binghamton University in 1990, making her the longest serving president of the university to date. She resigned at the end of June 2010 after being implicated in the Binghamton University basketball scandal.

== DeFleur at Binghamton ==
Some accomplishments and events from DeFleur's tenure:

- Began an aggressive fundraising campaign, more than doubling giving for multiple consecutive years.
- Moved athletics to Division I from Division III, changing the school's mascot from the Colonial to the Bearcat.
- Binghamton's publications rankings increased (although some have declined drastically in recent years, such as overall ranking in the Princeton Review).
- Reorganized schools at Binghamton: the College of Community and Public Affairs and the School of Education were created July 1, 2006, from the former School of Education and Human Development.
- Funded construction of over more than a dozen new buildings, including a new residence community, university union addition, events center, academic complex and the new Downtown University Center.
- The University’s endowment has risen from approximately $8 million to $64.5 million.
- Faculty research awards have increased 60 percent.
- Binghamton completed its first-ever comprehensive gifts campaign more than a year early, and at 121 percent of its goal.
- Binghamton was designated a New York State Center of Excellence in 2006.
- Announced retirement weeks before major scandal involving the basketball team was revealed to the public.
- University was not included in rankings and lists of most competitive colleges (such as BARRON'S GUIDE TO THE MOST COMPETITIVE COLLEGES) but included as a Best Buy.
- Implicated for ethical violations that had been hinted at throughout her tenure as university president but which were clearly described in the Kaye Report.

== Retirement ==
DeFleur resigned after being implicated in the Binghamton University basketball scandal in July 2010 to focus on her personal life.

== Criticisms ==
- Although the state ethics commission has never accused DeFleur of wrongdoing, some question the propriety of DeFleur sitting on boards of companies that do millions of dollars in business with the university that she oversees. For years, she was on the board of Energy East, in which she had held more than half a million dollars in stock. She is also a paid adviser to M&T Bank, a financial institution that had long had sole rights to operate on the Binghamton campus.
