= Subal Kumbhakar =

Indian-American economist

Subal C. Kumbhakar
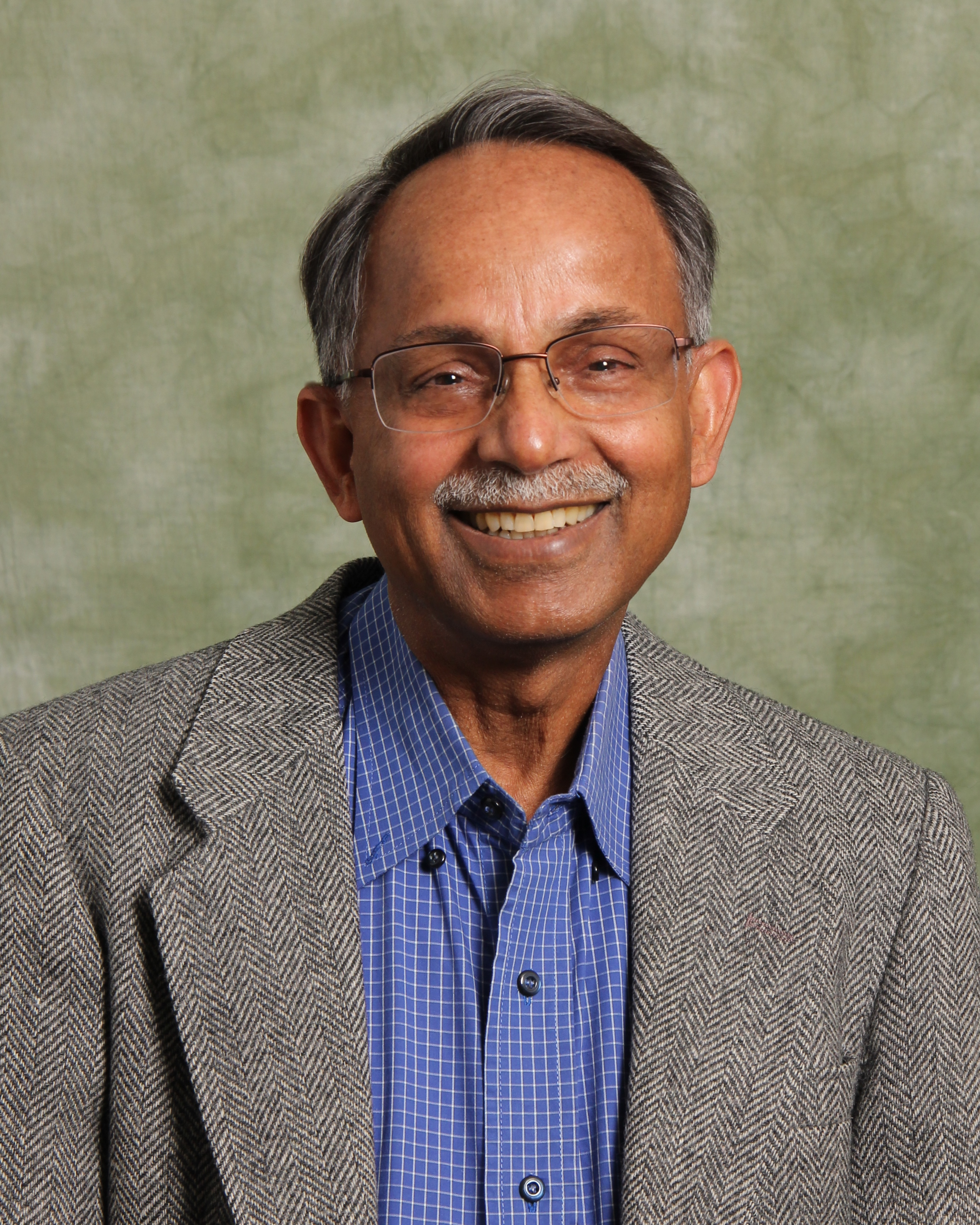

Academic background
- Education: Calcutta University; University of Southern California

Academic work
- Discipline: Econometrics; Applied Microeconometrics; Measurement of Efficiency and Productivity
- Institutions: State University of New York at Binghamton

Subal C. Kumbhakar is an Indian born American economist. He is a Distinguished Research Professor of Economics at Binghamton University. He was awarded Doctor Honoris Causa, 1997, University of Gothenburg, Sweden. He is a fellow of Journal of Econometrics, distinguished author of Journal of Applied Econometrics, co-editor of the Social Science Citation Index journal Empirical Economics, coauthor of a highly cited book on Stochastic Frontier Analysis. He is associated with the University of Stavanger, Norway and Inland School of Business and Social Sciences, Lillehammer, Norway. He advises Oxera Consulting LLP Oxford, UK on regulatory performance measures. He is internationally known for his research on efficiency and productivity. His models on efficiency and productivity are used by researchers worldwide.

== Academic career ==
Subal received his Ph.D. in economics from the University of Southern California in 1986. His main area of research is on econometric estimation of efficiency and productivity using Stochastic Frontier Approach. He has formulated a variety of panel data models to measure efficiency, which are applied by researchers and practitioners all over the world. His recent works include estimating green productivity and environmental efficiency. He also researched on economics. His current research includes productivity measurement.

Subal is currently a co-editor of Empirical Economics. He has also been serving as a Board of Editors and/or associate editors of Journal of Productivity Analysis since 1998, Technological Forecasting and Social Change: An International Journal since 1991, Journal of Regulatory Economics since 2015, Macroeconomics and Finance in Emerging Market Economies since 2007, Applied Econometrics since 2016, Ecos de Economia: A Latin American Journal of Applied Economics since 2016.

Subal is a co-author of the books Stochastic Frontier Analysis (2000) with Knox Lovell, and A Practitioner's Guide to Stochastic Frontier Analysis (2015) with H-J Wang and A Horncastle, both published by the Cambridge University Press.

== Academic history ==
- 1986 Ph.D., Economics, University of Southern California
- 1983 Masters of Arts, Economics, University of Southern California, Los Angeles
- 1977 Masters of Arts, Economics, Calcutta University, Calcutta, India

== Positions held ==
- 2005–present, Distinguished Research Professor of Economics, Binghamton University, State University of New York
- 2001 - 2005, Professor, Economics Department, Binghamton University (State University of New York)
- 1986 - 2000, Assistant, Associate and Full Professor, Economics Department, University of Texas at Austin
- 1977 - 1981, Assistant Professor and Reader, Economics Department, University of Burdwan, Burdwan, India.

== Honors ==
- Doctor Honoris Causa, University of Gothenburg, Sweden, 1997
- Fellow, Journal of Econometrics, 1998.
- Distinguished author, Journal of applied econometrics, 2017.
- Member/Opponent of Ph.D. Evaluation Committee (International): Athens University of Economics and Business (Greece), University of Western Australia (Perth), Swedish University of Agricultural Sciences (Umea, Sweden), Norwegian University of Life Sciences (As, Norway), Charles University (Czech Republic), Technical University of Dresden (Germany), University of Helsinki (Finland), University of Stavanger (Norway), Wageningen University (Netherlands), University of New England (Australia), University of Gothenburg (Sweden), Norwegian School of Business Administration (Bergen, Norway), Agricultural University of Norway (As, Norway), Indian Statistical Institute (Calcutta, India), Burdwan University (West Bengal, India), Jawaharlal Nehru University (New Delhi, India).

== Selected published works ==
=== Books ===
- Kumbhakar, Subal; Lovell, C.A. (2000). Stochastic Frontier Analysis. Cambridge: Cambridge University Press. doi:10.1017/CBO9781139174411. ISBN 9781139174411. Paperback version, 2003; Fudan Translation Series (Chinese translation ), 2008.
- Kumbhakar, Subal; Parmeter, Christopher (2014). Efficiency Analysis: A Primer on Recent Advances. NOW Publishing Company monograph. ISBN 978-1601988966.
- Kumbhakar, Subal; Wang, Hung-Jen; Horncastle, Alan (2015). A Practitioner's Guide to Stochastic Frontier Analysis Using Stata. Cambridge: Cambridge University Press. doi:10.1017/CBO9781139342070. ISBN 9781139342070.
- Kumbhakar, Subal (2015). Ray, Subhash (ed.). Benchmarking for Performance Evaluation: A Production Frontier Approach. Springer. ISBN 978-81-322-2253-8.

=== Journal special issue editor ===
- Kumbhakar, Subal; Ray, Subhash (2010). "Performance Measurement: Methodological and Empirical Issues". Indian Economic Review. 45 (2): 1–5. JSTOR 29793966.
- Kumbhakar, Subal; Sickles, Robin (2012). "Auction and Games". Journal of Econometrics. 168 (1): 1–174. doi:10.1016/j.jeconom.2011.09.014.
- Kumbhakar, Subal; Førsund, Finn (2015). "In Memoriam: Lennart Hjalmarsson, 1944–2012". Journal of Productivity Analysis. 43 (3): 233–415. doi:10.1007/s11123-015-0444-0.
- Kumbhakar, Subal; Parmeter, Christopher (2015). "Applications of Nonparametric and Semiparametric Models". Empirical Economics. 48 (1): 1–8. doi:10.1007/s00181-014-0889-4.
- Kumbhakar, Subal; Schmidt, Peter (2016). "Endogeneity in Econometric Models". Empirical Economics. 190 (2): 209–374.
- Kumbhakar, Subal; Malikov, Emir (2018). "Good Modelling of Bad Outputs". Empirical Economics. 54 (1): 1–6. doi:10.1007/s00181-017-1231-8.

=== Selected journal publications ===
- Kumbhakar, Subal; Jin, Man; Zhao, Shunan (2019). "Information Asymmetry and Leverage Adjustments: A Semiparametric Varying Coefficient Approach". Journal of the Royal Statistical Society, Series A (Statistics in Society). 183 (2): 581–605. doi:10.1111/rssa.12524. S2CID 209980241.
- Kumbhakar, Subal; Lai, Hung-pin (2019). "Technical and Allocative Efficiency in a Panel Stochastic Production Frontier System Model". European Journal of Operational Research. 278 (1): 255–265. doi:10.1016/j.ejor.2019.04.001. S2CID 132710806.
- Kumbhakar, Subal; Delgado, Michael; Ozabaci, Deniz; Sun, Yiguo (2020). "Smooth Coefficient Models with Endogenous Environmental Variables". Econometric Reviews. 39 (2): 158–180. doi:10.1080/07474938.2018.1552413. S2CID 159099212.
- Kumbhakar, Subal; Yao, Feng; Zhang, Fan (2019). "Semiparametric smooth coefficient stochastic frontier model with panel data". Journal of Business & Economic Statistics. 37 (3): 556–572. doi:10.1080/07350015.2017.1390467. S2CID 125322361.
- Kumbhakar, Subal; Malikov, Emir; Restrepo-Tobón, Diego (2018). "Heterogeneous Credit Union Production Technologies with Endogenous Switching and Correlated Effects" (PDF). Econometric Reviews. 37 (10): 1095–1119. doi:10.1080/07474938.2016.1222234. S2CID 85536174.
- Kumbhakar, Subal; Henderson, Daniel; Li, Qi; Parmeter, Christopher (2015). "Smooth coefficient estimation of a seemingly unrelated regression". Journal of Econometrics. 189 (1): 148–162. doi:10.1016/j.jeconom.2015.07.002.
- Kumbhakar, Subal; Tsionas, Efthymios (2016). "The Good, The Bad and The Technology: Endogeneity in Environmental Production Models" (PDF). Journal of Econometrics. 190 (2): 315–327. doi:10.1016/j.jeconom.2015.06.008.
- Kumbhakar, Subal; Sun, Kai; Restrepo-Tobón, Diego (2015). "Obelix vs. Asterix: Size of U.S. Commercial Banks and Its Regulatory Challenge". Journal of Regulatory Economics. 48 (2): 125–168. doi:10.1007/s11149-015-9275-1. hdl:10784/7615. S2CID 154452172.
- Kumbhakar, Subal; McCloud, Nadine (2012). "Institutions, foreign direct investment and growth: A hierarchical Bayesian approach". Journal of the Royal Statistical Society, Series A (Statistics in Society). 175 (1): 83–105. doi:10.1111/j.1467-985X.2011.00710.x. hdl:10.1111/j.1467-985X.2011.00710.x. S2CID 119767541.
- Kumbhakar, Subal; Bokusheva, Raushan (2009). "Modeling Farm's Production Decisions under Expenditure Constraints". European Review of Agricultural Economics. 36 (3): 343–367. doi:10.1093/erae/jbp031. hdl:20.500.11850/413528.
- Kumbhakar, Subal; Wang, Hung-Jen (2006). "Pitfalls in the Estimation of Cost Function Ignoring Allocative Inefficiency: A Monte Carlo Analysis". Journal of Econometrics. 134 (2): 317–340. doi:10.1016/j.jeconom.2005.06.025.
- Kumbhakar, Subal; Sarkar, Subrata (2003). "Deregulation, Ownership and Productivity Growth in the Banking Industry: Evidence from India". Journal of Money, Credit and Banking. 35 (3): 403–424. doi:10.1353/mcb.2003.0020. JSTOR 3649838. S2CID 153552779.
- Kumbhakar, Subal (2001). "Estimation of Profit Function when Profit is not Maximum". American Journal of Agricultural Economics. 83 (1): 1–19. doi:10.1111/0002-9092.00133. JSTOR 1244296. S2CID 154451078.
- Kumbhakar, Subal; Hjalmarsson, Lennart (1998). "Relative Performance of Public and Private Ownership under Yardstick Competition: Electricity Retail Distribution". European Economic Review. 42 (1): 97–122. doi:10.1016/S0014-2921(96)00052-9.
- Kumbhakar, Subal; Heshmati, Almas (1996). "Technical Change and Total Factor Productivity Growth in Swedish Manufacturing Industries". Econometric Reviews. 15 (3): 275–298. doi:10.1080/07474939608800356.
- Kumbhakar, Subal; Wheelock, David (1995). "Which Banks Chose Deposit Insurance? Evidence of Adverse Selection and Moral Hazard in a Voluntary Insurance System". Journal of Money, Credit and Banking. 27 (1): 186–201. doi:10.2307/2077858. JSTOR 2077858.
- Kumbhakar, Subal (1992). "Allocative Distortions, Technical Progress, and Input Demand in U.S. Airlines: 1970-1984". International Economic Review. 33 (3): 723–737. doi:10.2307/2527135. JSTOR 2527135.
- Kumbhakar, Subal; Bhattacharyya, Arunava (1992). "Price Distortions and Resource-Use Efficiency in Indian Agriculture: A Restricted Profit Function Approach". Review of Economics and Statistics. 74 (2): 231–239. doi:10.2307/2109654. JSTOR 2109654.
- Kumbhakar, Subal; Ghosh, Soumendra; McGuckin, Thomas (1991). "A Generalized Production Frontier Approach for Estimating Determinants of Inefficiency in U.S Dairy Farms". Journal of Business and Economic Statistics. 9 (3): 279–286. doi:10.1080/07350015.1991.10509853.
- Kumbhakar, Subal (1987). "The Specification of Technical and Allocative Inefficiency in Stochastic Production and Profit Frontiers". Journal of Econometrics. 34 (3): 335–348. doi:10.1016/0304-4076(87)90016-9.
