= Binghamton University =

Public university in Vestal, New York, US

State University of New York at Binghamton
- Former names: Triple Cities College of Syracuse University (1946–1950); Harpur College (1950–1965)
- Motto: "From breadth through depth to perspective" On seal: "Unity, Identity, Excellence"
- Type: Public research university
- Established: 1946; 80 years ago
- Parent institution: State University of New York
- Accreditation: MSCHE
- Academic affiliations: Space-grant
- Endowment: $330 million (2026)
- Chancellor: John B. King Jr.
- President: Anne D'Alleva
- Provost: Donald E. Hall
- Students: 18,652 (fall 2025)
- Undergraduates: 14,559 (fall 2025)
- Postgraduates: 4,093 (fall 2025)
- Location: Vestal, New York, US; 42°5′20″N 75°58′1″W
- Campus: 930 acres (3.8 km^{2}); Midsize city
- Other campuses: Binghamton; Johnson City
- Newspaper: Pipe Dream
- Colors: Green
- Nickname: Bearcats
- Sporting affiliations: NCAA Division I - America East; NEC; EIWA
- Mascot: Baxter the Bearcat
- Website: binghamton.edu

The State University of New York at Binghamton, commonly referred to as Binghamton University (BU) or SUNY Binghamton, is a public research university in Greater Binghamton, New York, United States. The university's main campus spans 930 acres (380 ha) in the suburb of Vestal. As of fall 2025, the university enrolled 18,652 students in its six constituent schools, which offer a comprehensive range of over 130 academic programs of study.

Founded in 1946 as a branch college of Syracuse University, the school joined the State University of New York (SUNY) in 1950 to become one of the system's liberal arts colleges. Its designation as one of four SUNY university centers in 1965 spurred the school's evolution to a large research university. Along with sustained growth in enrollment, the university has earned perennial recognition at a national level for its high selectivity and academics,, and continually has the lowest acceptance rates and highest graduation rates among all SUNY campuses.

The university is classified among R1: Doctoral Universities – Very high research activity. Binghamton's athletic teams are the Bearcats and they compete in Division I of the National Collegiate Athletic Association (NCAA). The Bearcats are members of, and compete primarily in, the America East Conference.

== History ==
=== Establishment ===
Binghamton University was established in 1946 in Endicott, New York, as Triple Cities College to serve the needs of local veterans returning from World War II. Thomas J. Watson, noted chairman and CEO of IBM, viewed the Triple Cities region of the state's Southern Tier as an area of great potential, given IBM's founding and prominent presence in Broome County. In the early 1940s, he collaborated with local leaders to begin establishing Triple Cities College as a two-year junior college operating as a satellite of private Syracuse University. Watson also donated land that would become the school's early home.

Originally, Triple Cities College students going on to a bachelor's degree finished their program at Syracuse. By the 1948–1949 academic year, the degrees could be completed entirely in Binghamton. In 1950, it split from Syracuse and became incorporated into the public State University of New York (SUNY) system as Harpur College, named in honor of Robert Harpur, a colonial teacher and pioneer who settled in the Binghamton area. Harpur College was designated one of only two liberal arts colleges in the system, which otherwise consisted of teaching colleges at the time. The other liberal arts college, Champlain College in Plattsburgh, closed in 1952 to make way for the Plattsburgh Air Force Base, and its records and library (along with some students and faculty) were transferred to Harpur College. Due to pressure from private colleges in the state, Harpur College remained SUNY's only liberal arts college for a decade, quickly earning a reputation for its academic rigor.

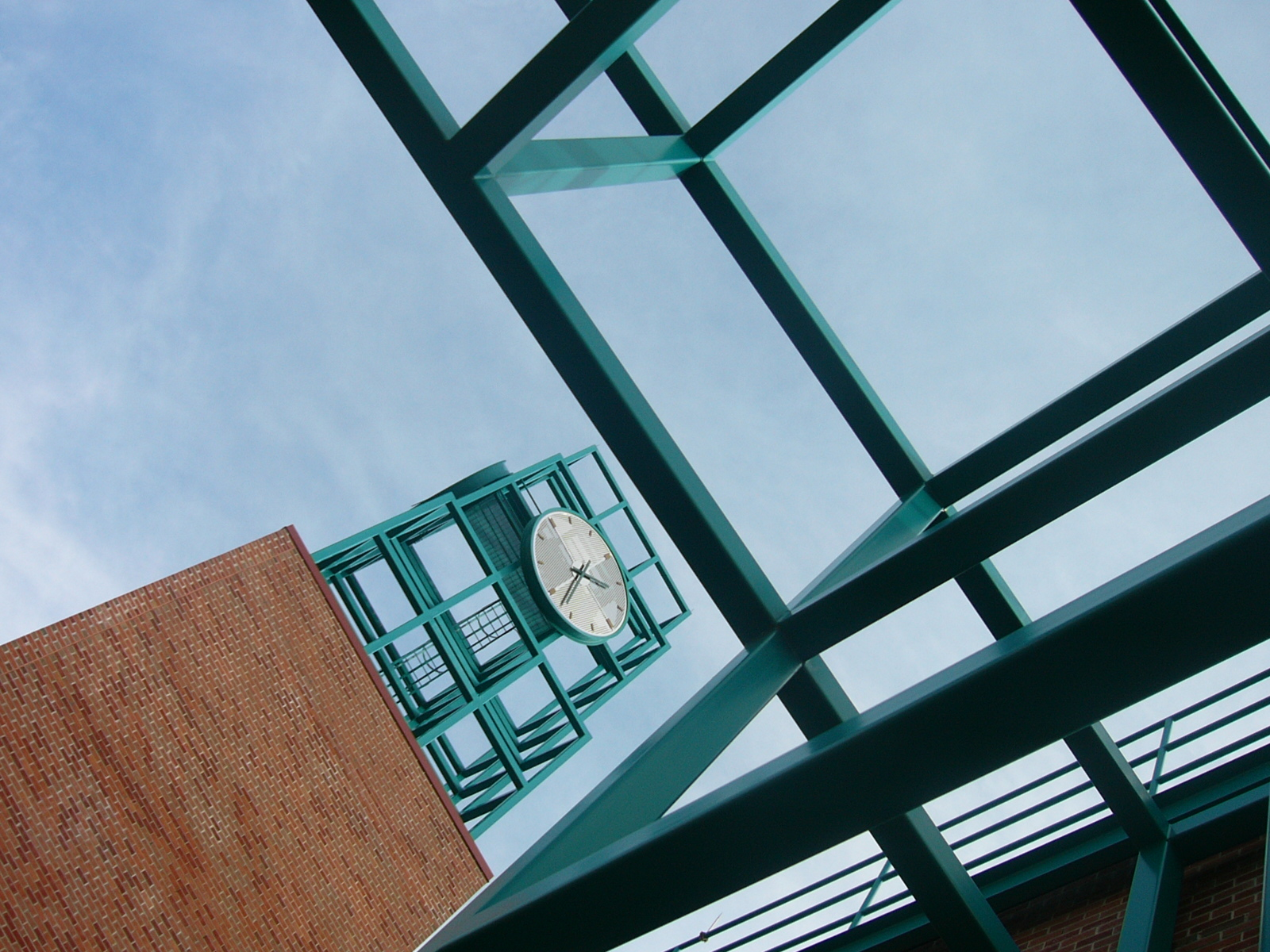
Clock tower at the University Union

In 1955, Harpur began to plan its current location in Vestal, a town next to Binghamton. A site large enough to anticipate future growth was purchased, with the school's move to its new 387-acre (1.57 km^{2}) campus being completed by 1961. Colonial Hall, Triple Cities College's original building in Endicott, stands today as the village's Visitor Center.

In 1965, Harpur College was selected to join New York state schools Stony Brook University, Albany, and Buffalo as one of the four new SUNY university centers. Redesignated the State University of New York at Binghamton, the school's new name reflected its status as an advanced degree granting institution. In a nod to tradition, its undergraduate college of arts and sciences remained "Harpur College". With more than 60% of undergraduate and graduate students enrolled in Harpur's degree programs, it is the largest of Binghamton's constituent schools. In 1967, the School of Advanced Technology was established, the precursor to the Thomas J. Watson School of Engineering and Applied Science, which was founded in 1983. In 2020, the school became the Thomas J. Watson College of Engineering and Applied Science.

School	Year Founded
Harpur College of Arts and Sciences	1950
Decker College of Nursing and Health Sciences	1969
School of Management	1970
Graduate School	1975
Watson College of Engineering and Applied Science	1983
College of Community and Public Affairs	2006
School of Pharmacy and Pharmaceutical Sciences	2017

Since 1992, the school has made an effort to distinguish itself from the SUNY system, rebranding itself as "Binghamton University," or "Binghamton University, State University of New York". Both names are accepted as first reference in news stories. While the school's legal and official name, the State University of New York at Binghamton, still appears on official documents such as diplomas, the administration discourages using the full name unless absolutely necessary. It also discourages references to the school as "SUNY—Binghamton," "SUNY—B," or "Harpur College".

=== Presidents ===
The first president of Harpur College, who began as dean of Triple Cities College, was Glenn Bartle. The second president, George Bruce Dearing, served several years before leaving to become vice chancellor for academic affairs at the SUNY Central Administration in Albany. Next was C. Peter Magrath, former interim president of the University of Nebraska–Lincoln, who served from 1972 to 1974 then left to become president at the University of Minnesota.

The fourth president at Binghamton was Clifford D. Clark, who left his position as dean of the business school at the University of Kansas to serve as vice president for academic affairs at Binghamton in 1973. He was asked to take on the job of acting president in the fall of 1974, when Magrath left for Minnesota. Clark was selected as president and served from March 1975 through mid-1990. He led the school's evolution from primarily a four-year liberal arts college to a research university. Clark added the Anderson Center for the Performing Arts and inaugurated the Summer Music Festival, created the Harpur Forum (now called the Binghamton University Forum), established the Thomas J. Watson School of Engineering and Applied Science, and fostered the expansion and development of the Decker School of Nursing.

Lois B. DeFleur became the university's fifth president upon Clark's retirement in 1990. She oversaw substantial additions to the student and faculty populations, expanded research activities and funding, formalized Binghamton's fundraising efforts, expanded the campus' physical footprint by approximately 20 buildings, launched Binghamton's "green" efforts, transitioned the school from Division III athletics to Division I and oversaw the university's increase in academic rankings. DeFleur retired in 2010 amidst scandal regarding her efforts to catapult the university sports program into higher ranks, her involvement implicated in a report from retired New York Chief Judge Judith Kaye. On July 1, Magrath returned as interim president.

On November 22, 2011, the SUNY Board of Trustees appointed Harvey G. Stenger, Jr. as the seventh president of Binghamton University, effective January 1, 2012. Stenger had been interim provost and executive vice president for academic affairs at the University at Buffalo since April 2011. In October 2024, Stenger announced plans to step down at the end of the academic year.

On November 1, 2025, Anne D'Alleva succeeded Stenger as Binghamton University's eighth president. She previously served as the provost and executive vice president for academic affairs at the University of Connecticut.

The following persons have served as president of Binghamton University since 1946:

No.	President	Term start	Term end	Refs.
President of Harpur College (1950–1965)
1	Glenn Bartle	1946	January 31, 1965	
Presidents of the State University of New York at Binghamton (1965–present)
2	Bruce Dearing	February 1, 1965	June 30, 1971 (Note: Resigned to become SUNY Vice-Chancellor.)	
acting	S. Stewart Gordon	July 1, 1971	June 30, 1972	
3	C. Peter Magrath	July 1, 1972	August 31, 1974 (Note: Resigned to head the University of Minnesota.)	
interim	Clifford D. Clark	September 1, 1974	March 26, 1975	
4	Clifford D. Clark	March 26, 1975	August 14, 1990	
5	Lois B. DeFleur	August 15, 1990	June 30, 2010	
6 interim	C. Peter Magrath	July 1, 2010	December 31, 2011	
7	Harvey G. Stenger	January 1, 2012	October 31, 2025	
8	Anne D'Alleva	November 1, 2025	present	

Table notes:

== Organization ==
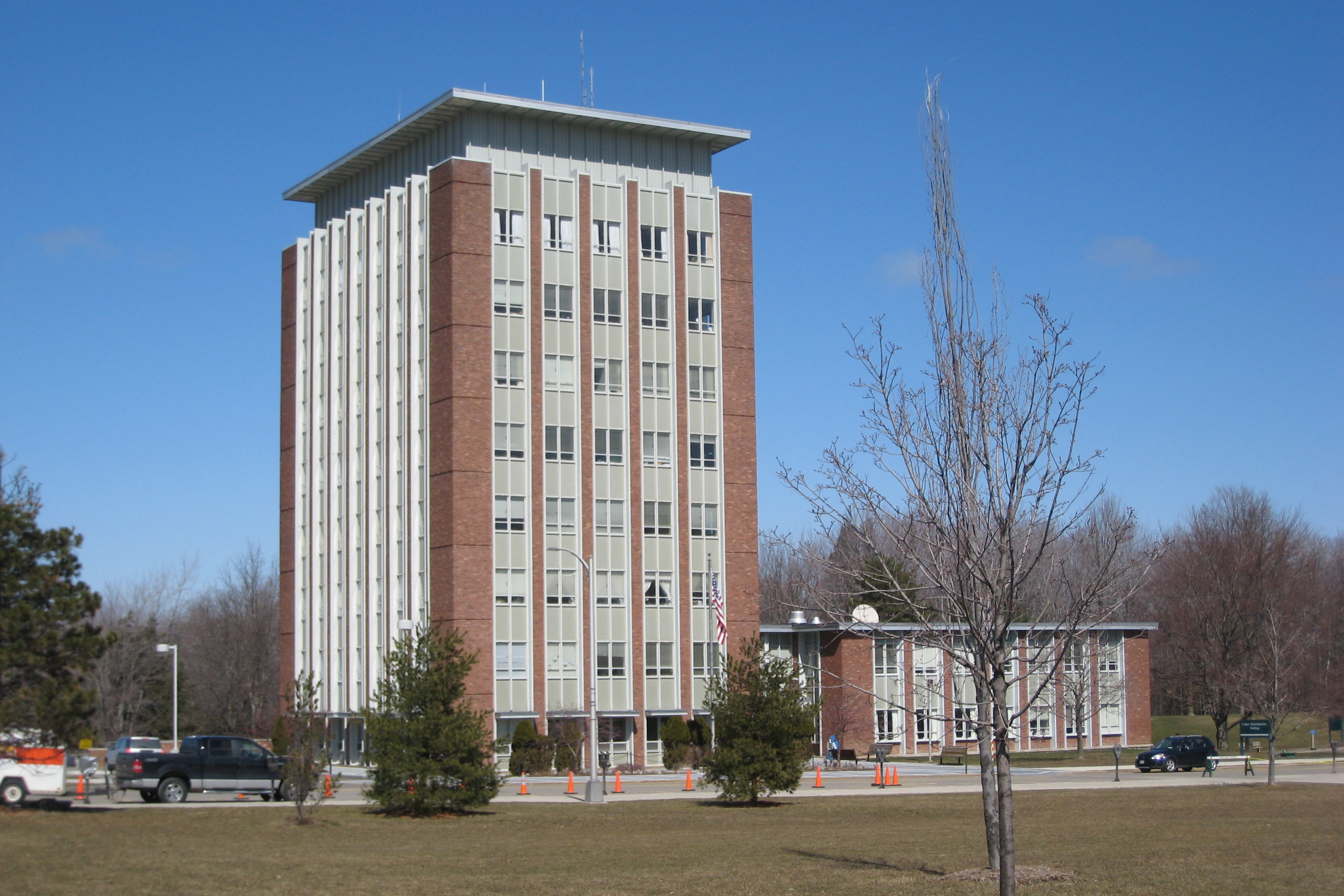
Couper Administration Building

=== University leadership ===
Binghamton is one of four university centers of the State University of New York (SUNY) system and is governed by its board of trustees. The Binghamton University Council oversees such aspects of the school's governance as student conduct, budget and physical facilities. Nine of its ten members are appointed by the state governor, one elected by the student body.

The university is organized into six administrative offices: The Office of the President, Division of Academic Affairs, Division of Advancement, Division of Operations, Division of Research, and the Division of Student Affairs. The Director of Athletics, Vice President for Diversity, Equity, and Inclusion, and the Division of Communications and Marketing all report to and are overseen by the university president.

As of 2026, the university's endowment reached $330 million, managed by the not-for-profit Binghamton University Foundation, which also oversees fundraising. This total includes a 2026 $30 million gift from a group of donors led by alumnus Tom Secunda, co-founder of Bloomberg L.P. It is the largest academic donation in the university's history. The gift established the New York Center for AI Responsibility and Research, a center focused on the responsible development of artificial intelligence.

=== Colleges and schools ===
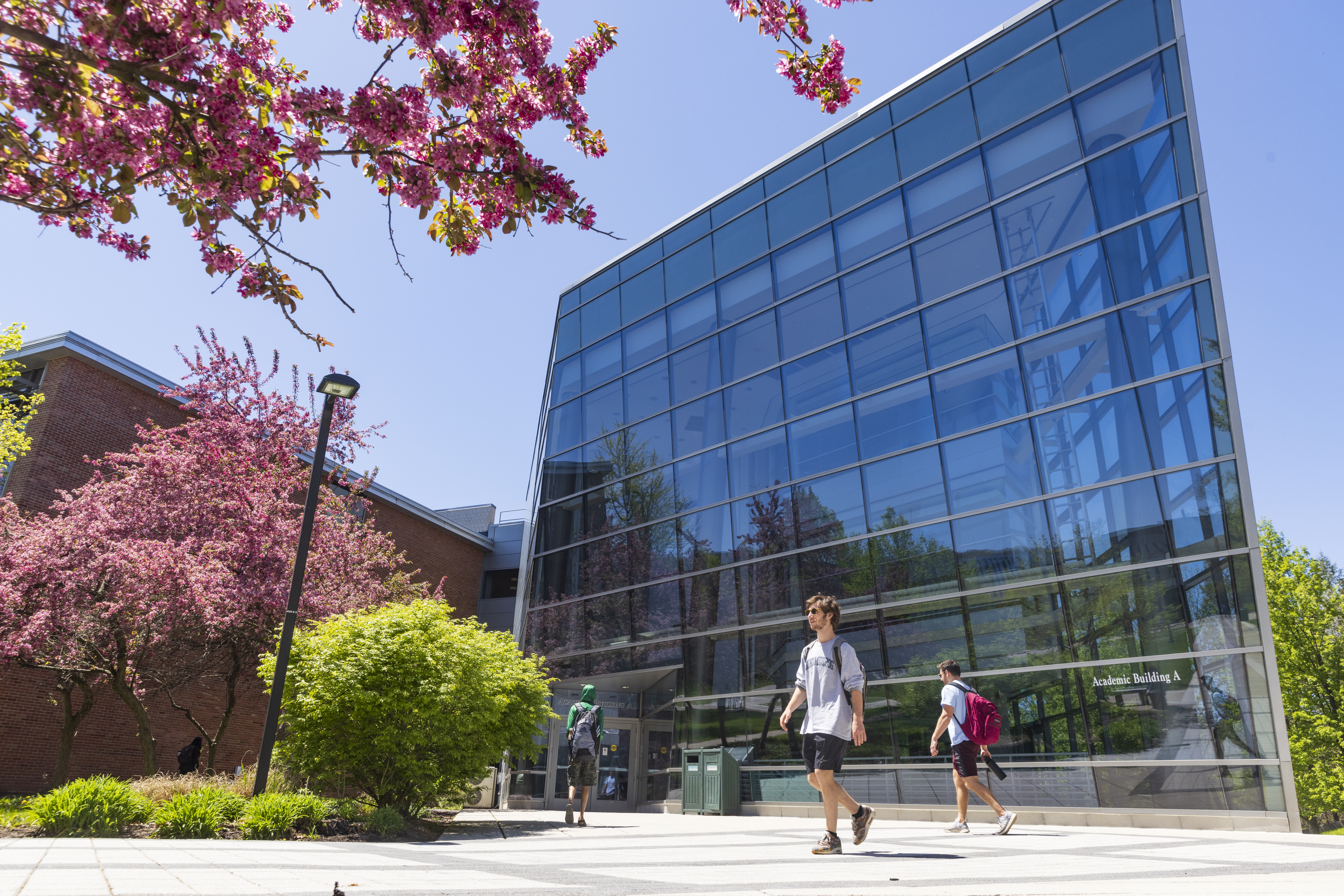
Academic A, home to the School of Management

Binghamton is composed of the following colleges and schools:

- Harpur College of Arts and Sciences is the oldest and largest of Binghamton's schools. It has over 10,300 undergraduates and 1,000 graduate students in 26 departments and 14 interdisciplinary degree programs in the fine arts, humanities, natural and social sciences, and mathematics.
- The College of Community and Public Affairs offers an undergraduate major in human development as well as graduate programs in social work; public administration; student affairs administration; human rights; sustainable communities (with Harpur College), public health (with Decker College), and teaching, learning and educational leadership. It was formed in July 2006, after a reorganization of its predecessor, the School of Education and Human Development, when it was split off along with the Graduate School of Education. In 2017, the Graduate School of Education merged back into the College of Community and Public Affairs as the Department of Teaching, Learning and Educational Leadership. The department continues to offer master's of science and doctoral degrees.
- The Decker College of Nursing and Health Sciences was established in 1969. The school offers undergraduate, master's and doctoral degrees in nursing. The school is accredited by the Commission of Collegiate Nursing Education (CCNE).
- The School of Management was established in 1970. It offers bachelor's, master's and doctoral degrees in management, finance, information science, marketing, accounting, and operations and business analytics. It is accredited by the American Assembly of Collegiate Schools of Business (AACSB).
- The Thomas J. Watson College of Engineering and Applied Science was founded in 1983, and offers undergraduate and graduate degrees in mechanical engineering, electrical engineering, computer engineering, biomedical engineering, systems science and industrial engineering, materials science and engineering, and computer science. All of the school's departments have been accredited by the Accreditation Board for Engineering and Technology.
- The Graduate School administers advanced-degree programs and awards degrees through the seven component colleges above. Graduate students will find almost 70 areas of study. Undergraduate and graduate students are taught and advised by a single faculty.
- The School of Pharmacy and Pharmaceutical Sciences, the newest school at Binghamton, offers doctoral degrees in pharmacy and pharmacology. The school has been granted Candidate status from the Accreditation Council for Pharmacy Education, which grants all the rights and privileges available to students of accredited schools, and anticipates full accreditation upon graduation of its inaugural class in 2021. The school enrolled its first students in fall 2017, and in 2018 opened its state-of-the-art, $60 million new building on a new Health Sciences Campus in Johnson City, near UHS-Wilson Medical Center.

== Campuses ==
=== Main campus ===
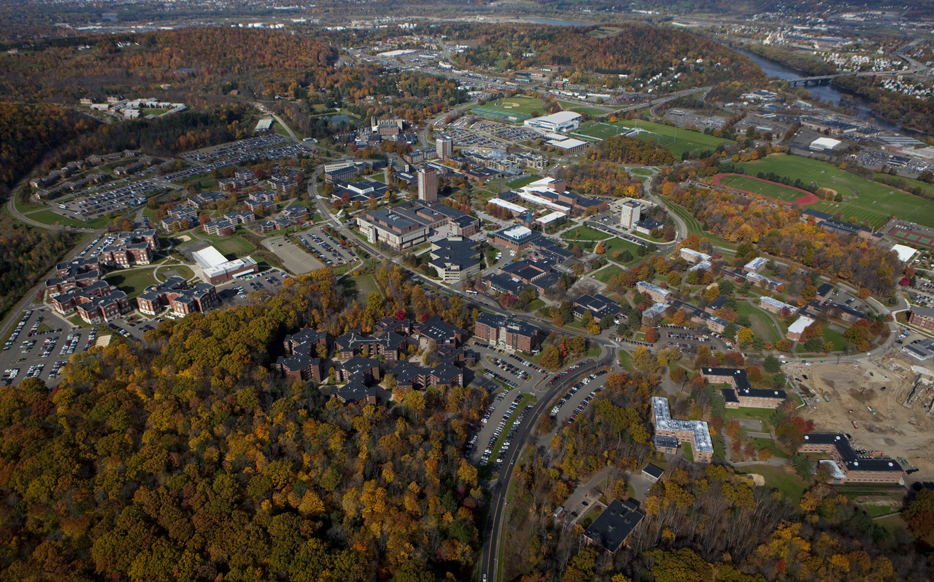
Binghamton campus and surroundings

The main campus in Vestal is spread over 930 acres (3.8 km^{2}) on a wooded hillside above the Susquehanna River; geographically, the Southern Tier of New York is located on Allegheny Plateau, a physiographic province of the Appalachian Mountains. The campus is shaped like a brain: the primary road on campus creates a closed loop to form the cerebrum and cerebellum, and the main entrance road creates the spinal cord which leads up to a traffic circle (representing the medulla). The main road is thus frequently referred to as The Brain. The connector road, which goes behind the Mountainview and College-in-the-Woods residential communities, is closed for a portion of the year (in late fall and early spring, to allow for safe migration of salamanders across the road). The campus features a 190 acres (0.77 km^{2}) Nature Preserve, which contains forest and wetland areas and includes a six-acre (24,000 m^{2}) pond, named Harpur Pond, that adjoins the campus. The Nature Preserve drains into Fuller Hollow Creek, which runs parallel along the eastern portion of the campus. Fuller Hollow Creek meanders north after leaving campus, where it soon empties into the Susquehanna River.

==== Libraries ====
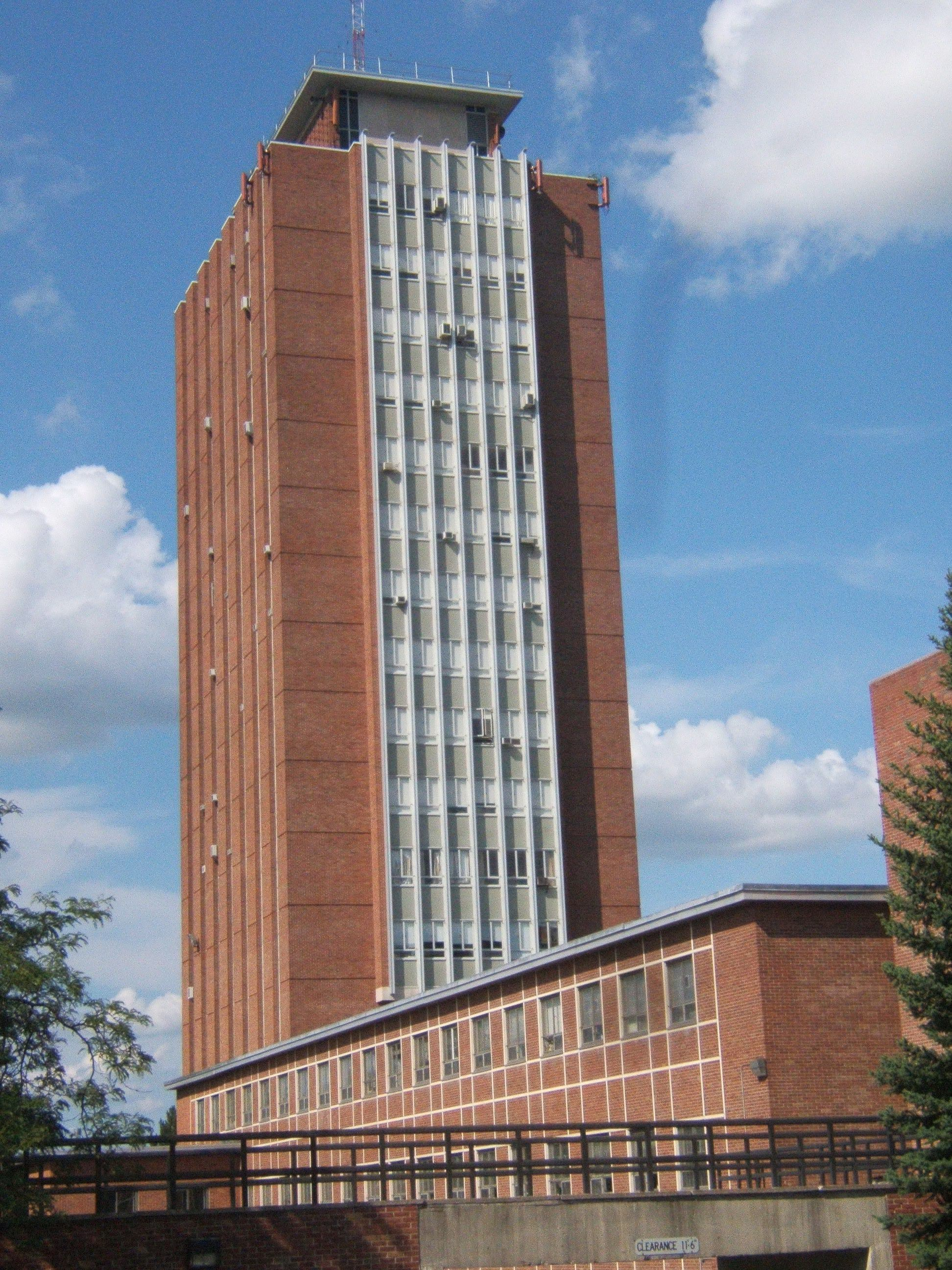
Glenn G. Bartle Library

The Glenn G. Bartle Library, named after the university's first president, contains collections in the humanities, social sciences, government documents, and collections in mathematical and computer sciences. Additionally, Bartle Library houses a fine arts collection and special collections (containing the Max Reinhardt Collection, as well as the Edwin A. Link and Marion Clayton Link Archives). The Science Library contains materials in all science and engineering disciplines, as well as a map collection. The University Downtown Center Library and Information Commons supports the departments of social work, human development, public administration, and student affairs administration.

The libraries offer a number of services including research consultation and assistance, a laptop lending program, customized instruction sessions and three information commons in the Bartle, Science and UDC libraries. The libraries offer access to various online databases to facilitate research for students and faculty. The entire campus is also served by a wireless internet network that all students, staff and faculty have access to, funded in part by mandatory student technology fees. The computing services center supports Windows, Macintosh and Unix systems, both in public computer labs and for students' personal computers.

==== Anderson Center for the Performing Arts ====
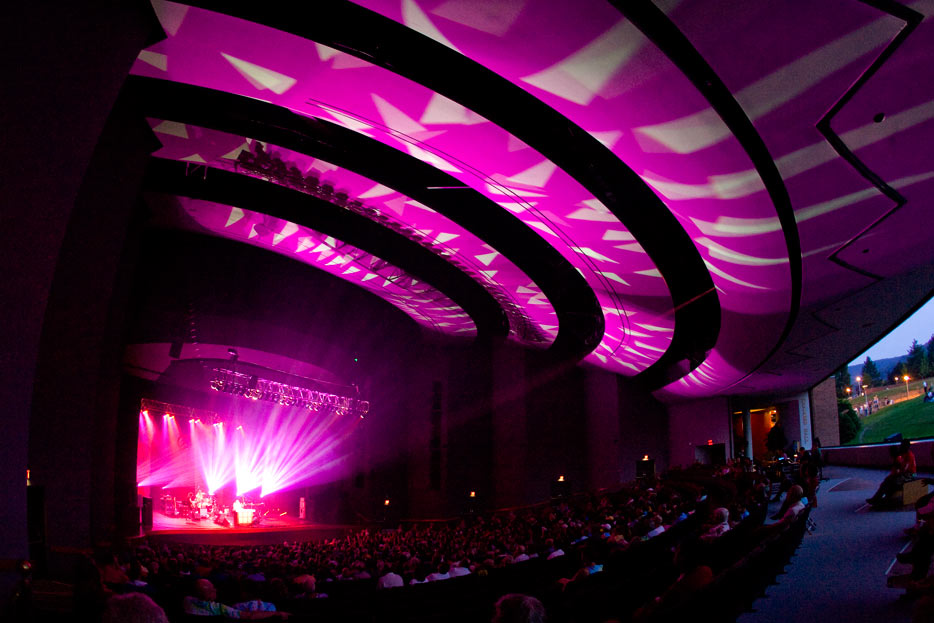
Anderson Center

The Anderson Center for the Performing Arts complex has three proscenium stages: Watters Theater, seating 574; the Chamber Hall, seating 450; and the Osterhout Concert Theater, seating 1,170 inside and 1,500 outside. The Osterhout Concert Theater has the ability to become an open-air amphitheater, with its movable, floor-to-ceiling glass windows that open up to a grassy hill.

==== University Art Museum ====
The university's art collection is housed at more than one location, but all within the Fine Arts Building. The building's main-level gallery hosts various artifacts which belong to the Permanent Collection, though typically showcases student work on a rotating basis. The Permanent Collection in the basement level of the building displays ancient art from Egypt, China and other locales. Lastly, the Elsie B. Rosefsky Gallery, just off the Grand Corridor, presents special exhibits and portfolios.

==== University Union ====
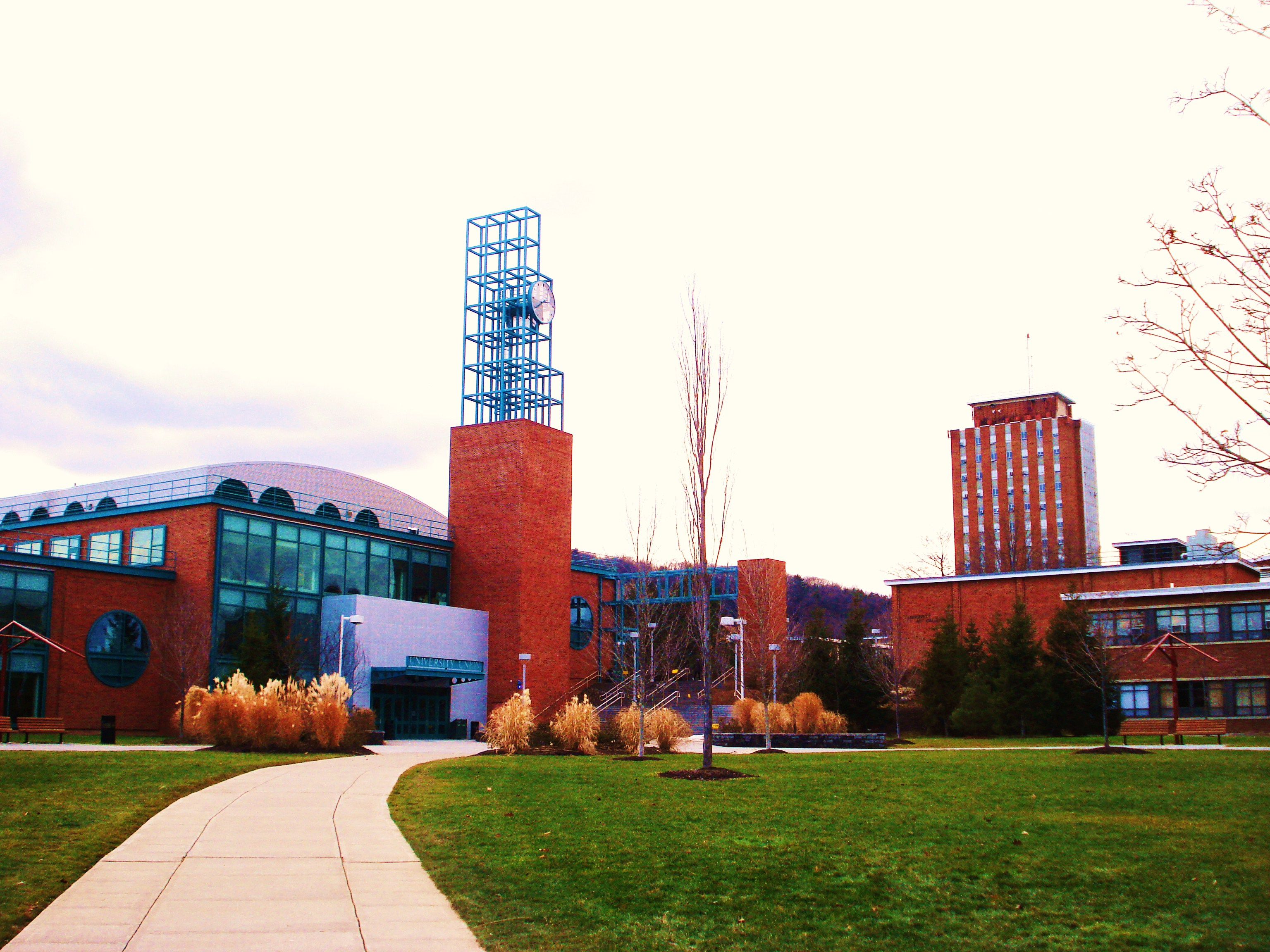
The University Union (foreground) and Glenn G. Bartle Library

The University Union is divided into two sections, sometimes referred to as the old Union and the new Union, sometimes referred to as Union East and West respectively, yet called "University Union (UU)" and "University Union West (UUW)" by the university itself. The Union houses many student organizations, a food co-op, The MarketPlace food court, a number of meeting spaces, many new classrooms, the University Bookstore and a branch of Visions Federal Credit Union.

On August 23, 2013, then-President Barack Obama hosted a town hall meeting in the University Union to discuss college affordability with students, faculty, and staff at Binghamton University.

==== Events Center ====
The Events Center is one of the area's largest venues for athletics, concerts, fairs and more. Home court to the Binghamton Bearcats basketball teams, the facility seats about 5,300 people for games. For concerts, Commencement and other larger events, the Events Center can hold up to 8,000 people. Home site for the America East Conference Men's Basketball Championships in 2005, 2006, and 2008, the court hosted the women's championships in 2007 and 2015.

==== Other athletic facilities ====
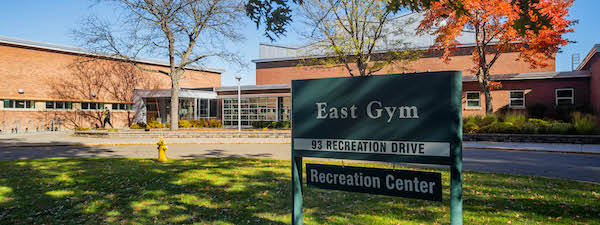
East Gym

In addition to the Events Center, the north end of campus houses the East and West Gyms, which host student recreation and varsity athletics programs. The East Gym underwent a major renovation, completed in winter 2012, and is now called the Recreational Center at the East Gym, and includes the 10,000-sq. ft. FitSpace fitness facility, three new multipurpose rooms, improved pool and court spaces, a new wellness services suite and completely renovated locker rooms. Other varsity facilities include baseball and softball fields, the Bearcats Sports Complex (a soccer and lacrosse stadium) and an outdoor track. With a gift from an anonymous donor, the baseball fields underwent a $2 million facelift including the addition of artificial turf and lights in 2016. Other student recreation features are a series of playing fields used for soccer, football, rugby and ultimate frisbee.

==== Science Complex ====
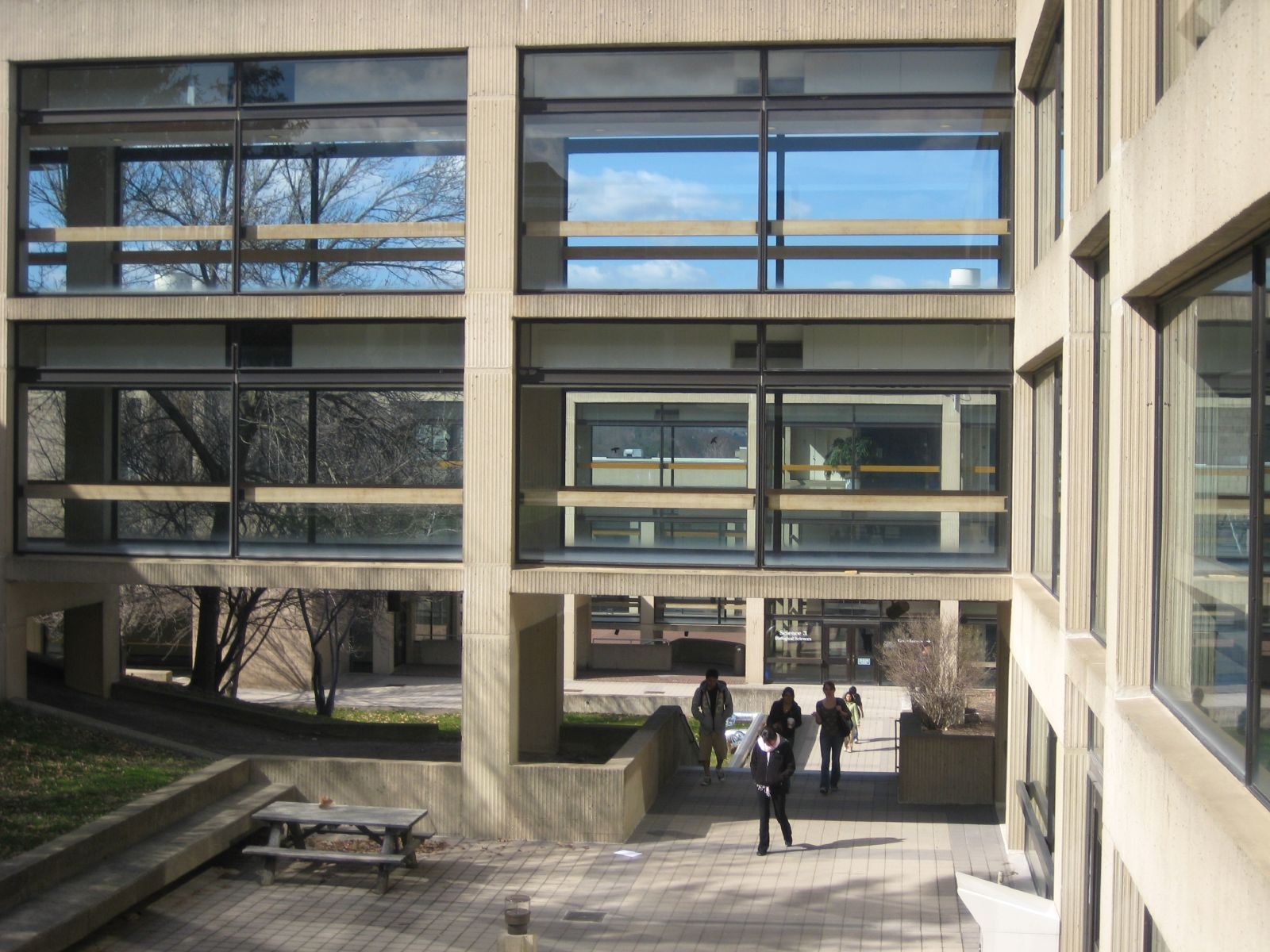
Science complex

The science complex includes five instructional and office buildings, as well as a four-climate teaching greenhouse and the Science Library. Buildings are named sequentially as Science 1 through 5. They contain faculty offices and classrooms for the biological sciences, anthropology, geological sciences and psychology departments.

==== Innovative Technologies Complex ====
More commonly known as the ITC, the Innovative Technologies Complex is a new development intended to advance venture capital research in both the support of the university's activities and that of the local high-technology industry. The complex includes four buildings: the Biotechnology Building, formerly belonging to NYSEG and now extensively renovated; the Engineering and Science Building, opened in 2011; the Center of Excellence Building, which houses the Small Scale Systems Integration and Packaging Center, a New York State Center of Excellence, opened in 2014; and the Smart Energy Building that houses the chemistry and physics departments, opened in 2017. Early talks indicated plans for a six-building complex at its completion.

==== Nature Preserve ====
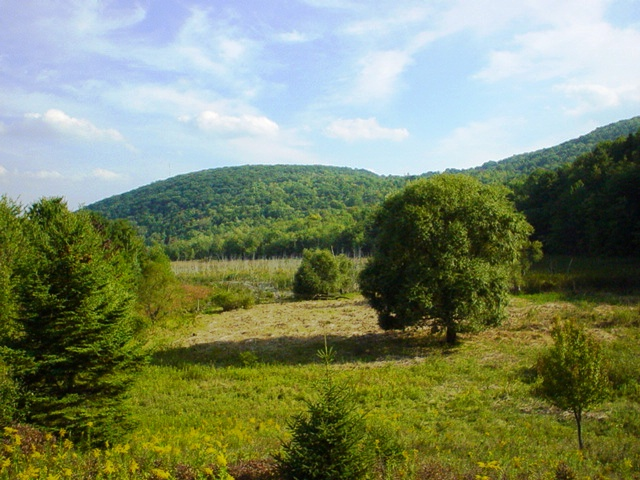
University Nature Preserve, Vestal, New York

The university's Nature Preserve is 190-acre (0.77 km^{2}) on the southern end of campus. The preserve features approximately 10 miles(16 km) of maintained paths, a six-acre pond, marsh areas, vernal pools, tall hills and a hill-top meadow.

=== Residential communities ===
Mountainview College

Residence halls at Binghamton are grouped into seven communities. The apartment communities used to house graduate students, but now house undergraduates. Of the residential colleges, Dickinson Community and Newing College are the newest. Dickinson features "flats" of either four single rooms or two double rooms and a single, while Newing features semi-private room styles sharing private bathrooms as well as some common bathrooms. College-in-the-Woods mixes suites and double- and triple-occupancy rooms, and Hinman College and Mountainview College consist of suites, exclusively. Susquehanna Community and Hillside Community contain only apartments.

Newing College, opened in fall 2011, and Dickinson Community, completed in 2013, are part of the university's $375 million East Campus Housing project, which also included a new collegiate center and dining facility. The old Newing community was razed to make room for the new communities. The old Dickinson community was renovated and repurposed for academics, offices and departments. The last of the new Newing and Dickinson residence halls were unveiled in 2013.

- Dickinson Community: Named for Daniel S. Dickinson, a U.S. Senator from the surrounding area, important as the "Defender of the Constitution" in the pre-Civil War era. Buildings are named after other prominent local figures, including founders of the university.
- Hinman College: Named for New York State Senator Harvey D. Hinman. Buildings are named after former New York State governors, and were constructed between 1967 and 1968.
- Newing College: Named for Stuart Newing, a local automobile dealer who was active in the effort to have SUNY purchase Triple Cities College. Buildings are named for Southern Tier towns and counties. Newing College was rebuilt completely, and the new residence halls and student center/dining hall opened in fall 2011.
- College-in-the-Woods: Named for its location in a wooded area of the campus. Buildings are named after tribes of the Iroquois Confederacy. College-in-the-Woods opened for residency in the fall of 1973.
- Mountainview College: The four individual residential halls—Cascade, Hunter, Marcy, and Windham—were named after peaks in the Adirondack and Catskill Mountains and each house up to 300 students.
- Susquehanna Community: Buildings are named for tributaries of the Susquehanna River, which flows through the city of Binghamton.
- Hillside Community: Named for its location at the highest part of the Binghamton campus. Halls are named for New York state parks. The 16 apartment buildings are ordered clockwise, in alphabetical order.

=== Health Sciences campus ===
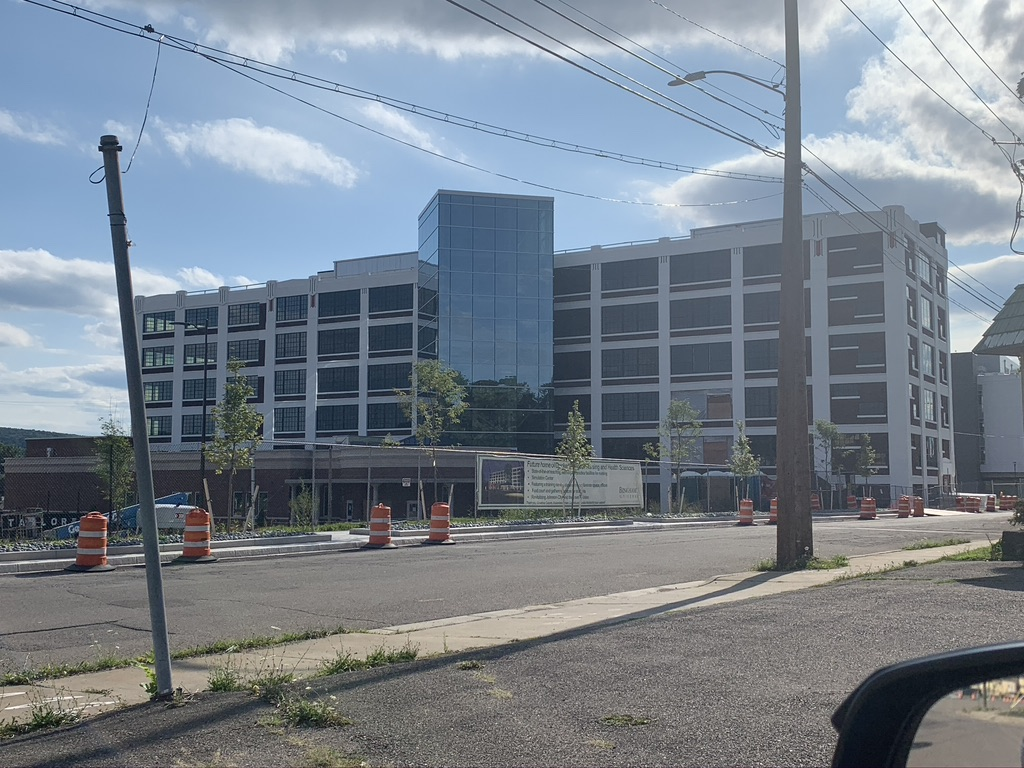
Decker College of Nursing and Health Sciences

Binghamton's nearly 15-acre Health Sciences Campus is located in Johnson City, New York. The campus is located a block from Main Street and is in close proximity to UHS Wilson Medical Center and Ascension Lourdes Hospital. The School of Pharmacy building opened in 2018, while the first floor of the Decker College of Nursing and Health Sciences building opened in January 2021. The campus also contains the Pharmaceutical Research and Development Center, along with the Ford Family Wellness Center for Seniors. The university also plans on developing a park on two acres of land between Corliss Avenue and Main Street, which will offer an attractive and safe connection between university facilities and the downtown business district.

=== Downtown Center ===
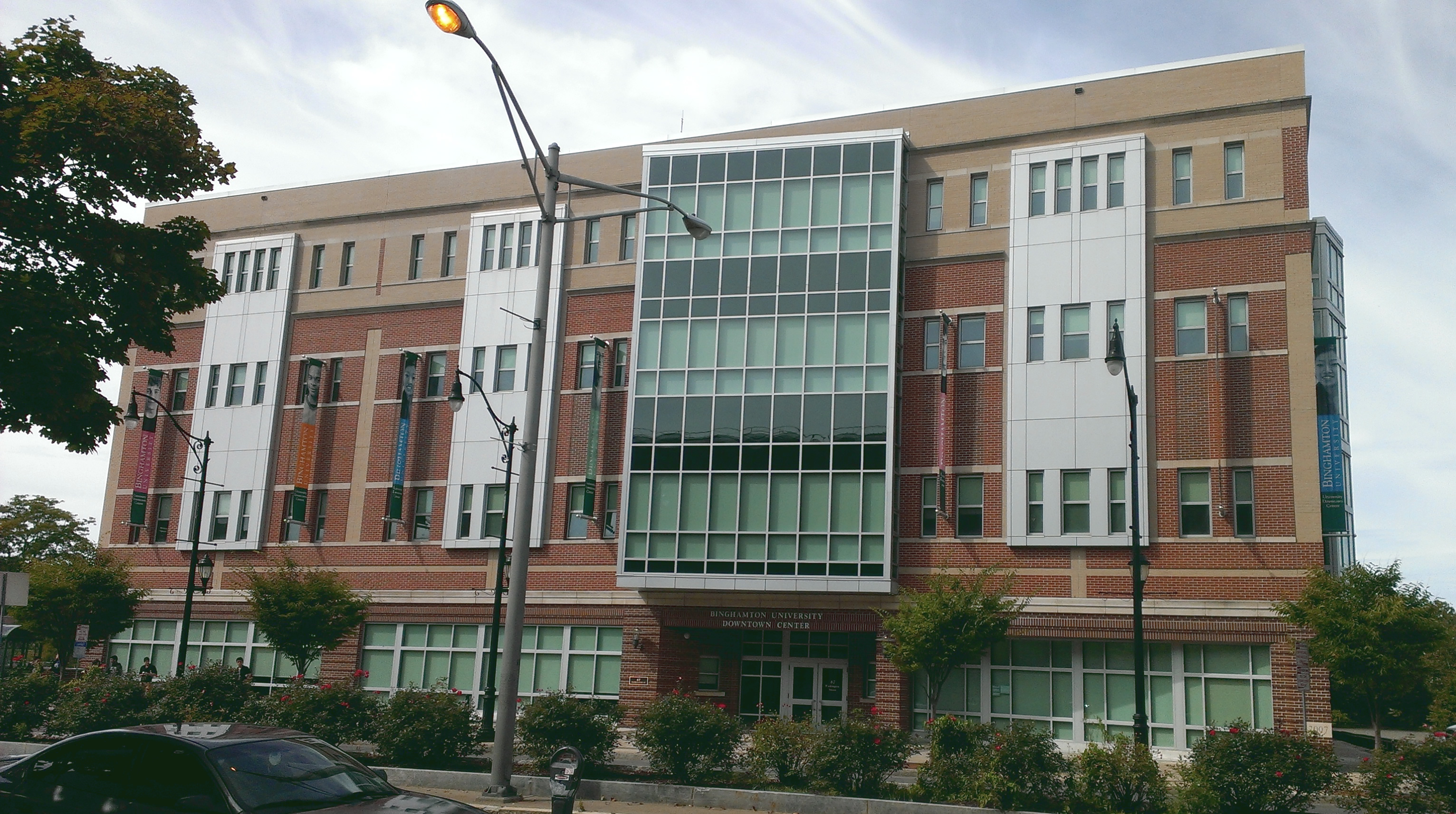
University Downtown Center

The University Downtown Center, located near the confluence of the Susquehanna and Chenango Rivers, opened in 2007 and houses the College of Community and Public Affairs. In 2011, the Downtown Center was severely damaged from flooding caused by Tropical Storm Lee. While only the lowest floor of the building was filled with water, the electric company was unable to shut the power off in time, resulting in the building's electrical system being ruined. Classes were moved to the Main campus until repairs were completed. Repairs took a year to complete, and the UDC reopened for the start of the fall 2012 semester. In 2017, the university received $2.7 million for the flood repairs.

== Academics ==
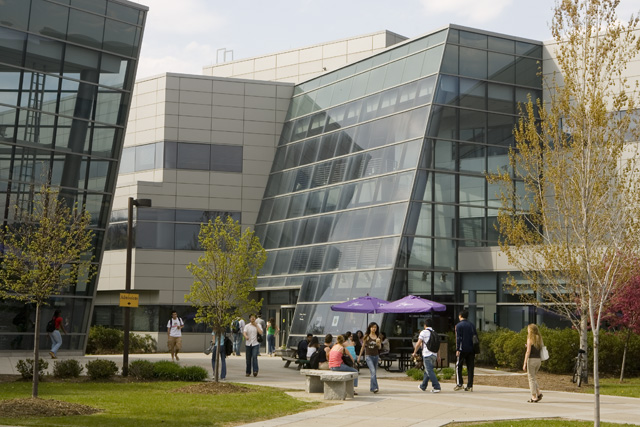
The School of Management and Academic B

Binghamton offers more than 130 academic undergraduate majors, minors, certificates, concentrations, emphases, tracks and specializations and more than 60 master's, 30 doctorate and 50 accelerated (combined bachelor's/master's) degrees. There also exist interdisciplinary programs that allow individualized degree programs at both the undergraduate and graduate level.

The school offers several early assurance programs that guarantee acceptance to graduate/professional schools outside of Binghamton, such as the Norton College of Medicine at SUNY Upstate Medical University. BU and Upstate offer an Early Assurance Program (EAP) for pre-medical College Sophomores pursuing their M.D. degree. Students accepted into the program are required to finish their undergraduate education and maintain a 3.50 GPA to be guaranteed a seat at the medical school.

=== Admissions and finance ===
Undergraduate admissions statistics
- 2023 entering class
- Admit rate: 37.73% (▼ −2.08)
- Yield rate: 16.53% (▼ −2.58)

Test scores middle 50%^{[i]}
- SAT Total: 1350–1470 (among 39% of FTFs)
- ACT Composite: 30–33 (among 9% of FTFs)

Binghamton University is one of the most selective schools in the SUNY system. In the fall of 2024, the university received over 57,000 applications. In the fall of 2024, the undergraduate acceptance rate was 39%. According to the latest data, Binghamton University has the following records: an average SAT Math score of 709, an average SAT Verbal score of 699, a median ACT score between 29 and 33, a median high school GPA between 3.7 and 3.9 (or 93–98), and an average Transfer GPA between 3.3 and 3.8.

In-state tuition is $7,070 and out-of-state tuition is $26,160 (as of July 2023). The average debt at graduation is $14,734, and the school is in the top 15 lowest debt-load amongst public colleges in the country.

=== Rankings and reputation ===
Academic rankings

National
- Forbes: 52
- U.S. News & World Report: 73
- Washington Monthly: 107
- WSJ/College Pulse: 152

Global
- ARWU: 501–600
- QS: 1001–1200
- THE: 601
- U.S. News & World Report: 1055

Binghamton is ranked tied for 73rd among national universities, tied for 34th among public schools, and tied for 1055th among global universities for 2025 by U.S. News & World Report. In 2021, Forbes magazine rated Binghamton No. 77 out of the 600 best private and public colleges, universities and service academies in America. The university is ranked 653rd in the world, 162nd in the nation in the 2021–22 Center for University World Rankings.

Money magazine ranked Binghamton 73rd in the country out of 739 schools evaluated for its 2020 "Best Colleges for Your Money" edition, and 48th in its list of the 50 best public schools in the U.S. In its inaugural college rankings, based upon "... the economic value of a university...," The Economist ranked Binghamton University 74th overall in the nation.

Binghamton University was ranked the 18th best public college in the U.S. by The Business Journals in 2015. In 2016 Binghamton was ranked as the 10th best public college in the United States by Business Insider. In 2018, the university was ranked 401–500 by Times Higher Education World Ranking.

The university was called a Public Ivy by Howard and Matthew Greene in a book titled The Public Ivies: America's Flagship Public Universities (2001). It was a runner-up for the original Public Ivy list in 1985. In its inaugural list in 2024, Forbes named Binghamton as one of its 20 "New Ivies".

Binghamton was ranked 93rd in the 2020 National Universities category of the Washington Monthly college rankings in the U.S., based on its contribution to the public good, as measured by social mobility, research, and promoting public service.

According to the 2014 BusinessWeek rankings, the undergraduate business school was ranked 57th among Public Schools in the nation. In 2010 it was ranked as having the second best accounting program.

== Research ==
The university is designated as an advanced research institution, with a division of research, an independent research foundation, several research centers including a New York State Center of Excellence, and partnerships with other institutions. Binghamton University was ranked 163rd nationally in research and development expenditures by the National Science Foundation.

=== SUNY Research Foundation ===
The Research Foundation for the State University of New York is a private, nonprofit educational corporation that administers externally funded contracts and grants for and on behalf of SUNY.

=== Centers and institutes ===
33 organized research centers and institutes for advanced studies facilitate interdisciplinary and specialized research at the university. The university is home to the New York State Center of Excellence in Small Scale Systems Integration and Packaging (S3IP). S3IP conducts research in areas such as microelectronics manufacturing and packaging, data center energy management, and solar energy. Other research centers and institutes include the Center for Development and Behavioral Neuroscience (CDBN), Center for Interdisciplinary Studies in Philosophy, Interpretation, and Culture (CPIC), Institute for Materials Research (IMR). The Fernand Braudel Center for the Study of Economies, Historical Systems, and Civilizations (FBC) closed on June 30, 2020.

== Student life ==
Undergraduate demographics as of Fall 2023
Race and ethnicity	Total
Race and ethnicity	Total
White	53%
Asian	18%
Hispanic	13%
Black	5%
International student	4%
Two or more races	4%
Unknown	2%
Economic diversity
Low-income (Note: The percentage of students who received an income-based federal Pell grant intended for low-income students.)	27%
Affluent (Note: The percentage of students who are a part of the American middle class at the bare minimum.)	73%

=== Student body ===
As of 2025, there are 14,559 undergraduate students and 4,093 graduate students enrolled at Binghamton University, with 994 full-time faculty and a student-to-faculty of 17:1. 84% of undergraduate students at Binghamton are residents of New York state, with more than 60 percent from the greater New York City area and the remainder from all corners of the state. The remaining 16 percent of the undergraduate student body is made up of residents of other states in the U.S. (7.5 percent) and international students (8.5 percent) from around the world.

=== Greek life ===
There are many recognized fraternities and sororities at the university. Over 40 fraternity and sorority chapters are overseen by 7 governing councils, including the Interfraternity Council (IFC), Multicultural Greek and Fraternal Council (MGFC), National APIDA Panhellenic Association Council (NAPA), National Association of Latino Fraternal Organizations Council (NALFO), National Pan-Hellenic Council (NPHC), Panhellenic Council (PC), and the Professional Fraternity Council (PFC).

=== Student organizations ===
In 1953 the state university's trustees moved to dissolve national fraternities, and at Harpur the gap was filled by local social clubs. One was the Endymions. The Colonist of 1963 gives the club a page of its own in the Social Clubs section, group photograph and roster included, and prints a notice in which the Endymion Society congratulates that year's graduating class. The 1966 volume still lists the club among the activities its seniors recorded, its officers included.

Student organizations at Binghamton are organized and run through the Student Association at Binghamton University. It provides a number of services and entertainment for students, including bus transportation and the annual Spring Fling festival. In 2013, the university and the Student Association collaborated to introduce B-Engaged, a website which features a complete list of all involvement opportunities at Binghamton.

The Student Association of Binghamton University, Inc. (SA) is the student union of undergraduate students at the university. It is a 501(c)(3) not-for-profit organization that is autonomous from the university. It was first formed in 1978 and now represents and provides resources for over 13,000 undergraduate students, charters student groups, provides concerts and programming, and transportation services. Notable student organization at the university include:

- WHRW: Student radio station founded in 1961.
- Pipe Dream: Student newspaper founded in 1946 as The Colonial News. Run in addition to the school's official news source BingUNews.
- Harpur's Ferry Student Volunteer Ambulance Service: EMS provider for the Binghamton University campus and all off-campus students. It was founded in 1973 and has twice been recognized as the No. 1 collegiate Emergency Medical Service agency in the nation.
- Explorchestra: University's composers' orchestra is dedicated to the promotion of new music by composers from diverse backgrounds.

=== Transportation ===
Bus transportation on campus and in some neighborhoods is provided by the student-owned and operated OCC Transport. OCCT is free for all students; it is supported by mandatory student activity and transportation fees and by funds and resources provided by the university. OCCT is managed by the Student Association. Students, faculty and staff can ride the Broome County Transit bus system for free, paid for through a portion of the transportation fee.

=== Athletics ===
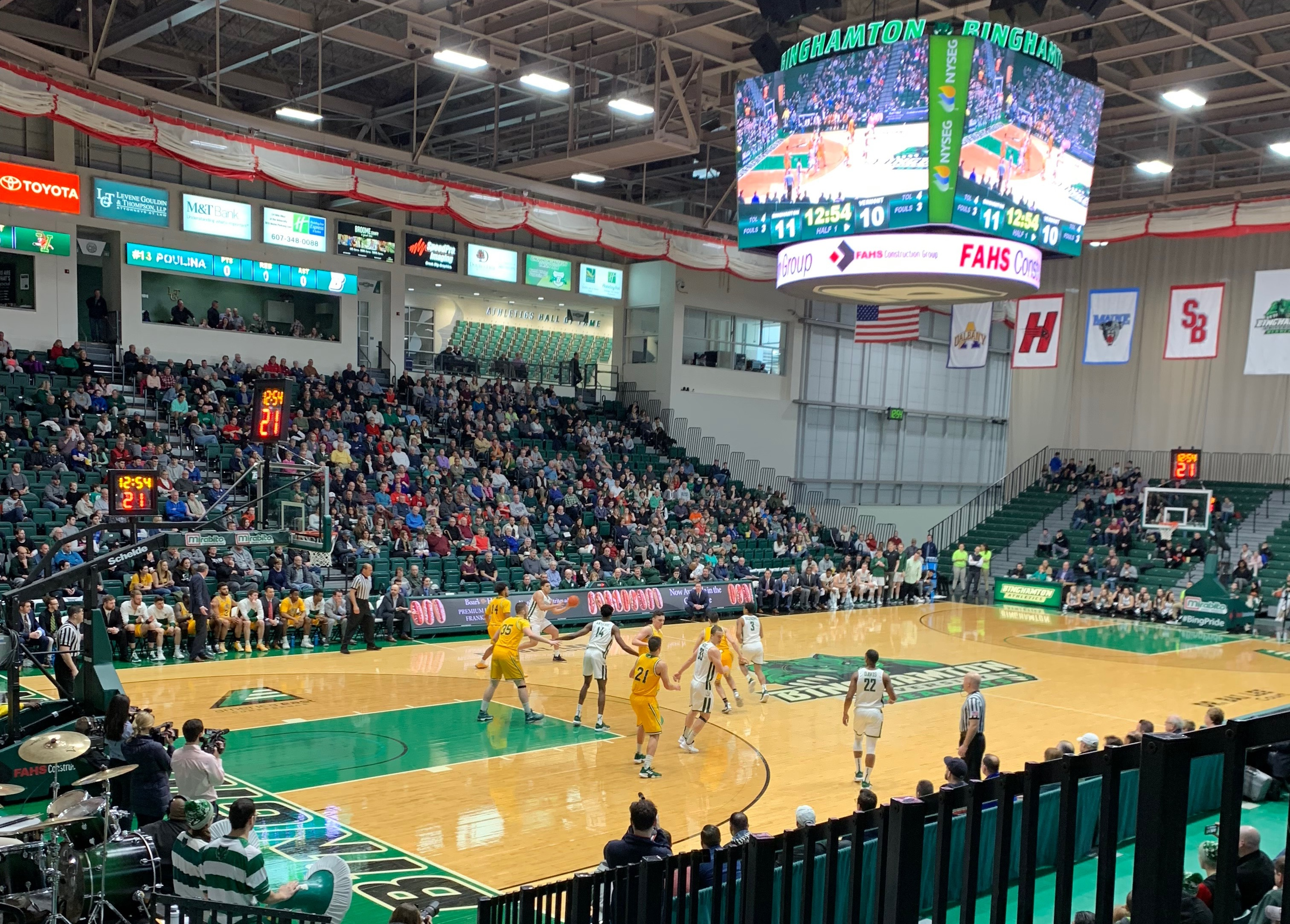
Binghamton Bearcats men's basketball playing Vermont at the Events Center

Binghamton University's Intercollegiate Athletics program is an NCAA Division I program. The Intercollegiate Athletics program comprises 21 sports that compete in the America East Conference for all sports except men's golf, men's tennis, and women's tennis which are affiliate members of the Northeast Conference, and the men's wrestling team which is a member of the Eastern Intercollegiate Wrestling Association. The 21 sports include Baseball, Men's & Women's Basketball, Men's & Women's Cross Country, Men's Golf, Men's & Women's Lacrosse, Men's & Women's Soccer, Softball, Men's & Women's Swimming & Diving, Men's & Women's Tennis, Men's & Women's Indoor Track, Men's & Women's Outdoor Track, Women's Volleyball and Men's Wrestling.

The school also hosts several intramural and inter-community sports. Binghamton University, and more specifically Hinman College, is considered to be the creator of Co-Rec Football, a popular version of flag/touch football and is generally played amongst several teams within each dormitory community.

Binghamton athletics gained significant negative attention during the Binghamton University basketball scandal in 2010, when it was revealed that the school had compromised its integrity and committed internal violations in pursuit of athletic glory. The scandal left Binghamton's basketball team in ruin.

=== Alma mater ===
In the Rolling Hills of Binghamton is the official alma mater song of Binghamton University, composed by David Engel (class of 1986)

== Notable people ==
=== Faculty ===
- David L. Cingranelli, SUNY Distinguished Professor of Political Science
- Jessica J. Fridrich, SUNY Distinguished Professor of Electrical and Computer Engineering
- J. David Jentsch, SUNY Distinguished Professor of Psychology
- Subal C. Kumbhakar, SUNY Distinguished Professor of Economics
- Kanneboyina Nagaraju, SUNY Distinguished Professor of Pharmacy & Pharmaceutical Sciences
- Donald G. Nieman, Professor of History and provost from 2012 to 2022
- Nkiru Nzegwu, SUNY Distinguished Professor of Africana Studies
- Pedro Ontaneda, SUNY Distinguished Professor of Mathematical Sciences
- Solomon W. Polachek, SUNY Distinguished Professor of Economics
- Bahgat G. Sammakia, SUNY Distinguished Professor of Mechanical Engineering
- M. Stanley Whittingham, SUNY Distinguished Professor of Chemistry, winner of the 2019 Nobel Prize in Chemistry

==== Former faculty ====
- Ken Jacobs (1933–2025), experimental filmmaker
- Ali Mazrui (1933–2014), author on African and Islamic studies
- Tito Perdue, novelist and author of Lee; former Binghamton librarian
- Immanuel Wallerstein (1930–2019), sociologist and economic historian best known for his development of world-systems theory.
- David Sloan Wilson, professor emeritus, biological sciences/anthropology
- Larry Woiwode, author

== In popular culture ==
To fans of the Americana-psychedelic-rock band The Grateful Dead, the name "Harpur College" specifically refers to a concert the band played at the college on May 2, 1970. According to Jimmy Cawley writing in the Boston Globe, "The Harpur College show has long been prized by tape collectors as an example of the depth the Dead were capable of on any given night." Binghamton and Binghamton University also provide the setting for most of the fictional 2014 romantic comedy film The Rewrite written and directed by Binghamton graduate Marc Lawrence, starring Hugh Grant as a failing Hollywood scriptwriter who reluctantly comes to Binghamton as a teacher, and finds a new purpose and direction in his life. Several scenes were shot at Binghamton and the university, although for the majority of the movie, Long Island University's Post campus in Nassau County acted as a stand-in for BU for stated budgetary reasons.
