= Anne D'Alleva =

American art historian and academic administrator

8th President of Binghamton University
- Incumbent
- Assumed office November 1, 2025
- Preceded by: Harvey G. Stenger

Personal details
- Born: Anne E. D'Alleva
- Education: Harvard University (BA); Columbia University (PhD)

Anne E. D'Alleva is an American art historian and academic administrator serving as the eighth president of Binghamton University since 2025. Prior to that, D'Alleva served as provost of University of Connecticut from 2022 to 2025.

== Career ==
D'Alleva received a B.A. in art history from Harvard University. She earned her M.A. and Ph.D. in art history from Columbia University, where she also obtained a graduate certificate in feminist theory.

After completing postdoctoral fellowships at the Australian National University and through the Getty Foundation, D'Alleva joined the faculty at the University of Connecticut in 1999 with a joint appointment in Art History and Women’s, Gender, and Sexuality Studies. Following the September 11 attacks, D'Alleva, then an assistant professor at UConn, led a movement encouraging students to wear hijabs on campus to show solidarity with Muslim students and combat Islamophobia. She later served as head of the Department of Art and Art History and as an associate dean within the School of Fine Arts. In 2015, she was appointed dean of the School of Fine Arts. In May 2022, D'Alleva became the university's interim provost. She was formally appointed provost and executive vice president for academic affairs in December 2022, becoming the first woman to hold the position.

On August 19, 2025, the State University of New York (SUNY) board of trustees appointed D'Alleva the eighth president of Binghamton University. She assumed the presidency on November 1, 2025, succeeding Harvey G. Stenger.
