= Harvey G. Stenger =

American educator and administrator

Harvey Stenger

7th President of Binghamton University
- In office January 1, 2012 – October 31, 2025
- Preceded by: C. Peter Magrath
- Succeeded by: Anne D'Alleva

Personal details
- Education: Cornell University (BS); Massachusetts Institute of Technology (MS, PhD)

Harvey G. Stenger is an American educator and academic administrator, who served as the seventh president of Binghamton University from 2012-2025. He announced in October 2024 that he would retire at the end of the academic year.

== Background and education ==
Harvey G. Stenger is a native of upstate New York. He received his B.S. from Cornell University in chemical engineering in 1979 and his Ph.D. from the Massachusetts Institute of Technology in 1983. While at Cornell, he joined Alpha Sigma Phi fraternity.

== Employment history ==
Lehigh University

- 1984–1988 Assistant professor of chemical engineering
- 1988–1991 Associate professor of chemical engineering
- 1991–2006 Professor of chemical engineering
- 1989–1991 Co-chairman, Dept. of Chemical Engineering
- 1991–1993 Director, Environmental Studies Center
- 1993–1999 College of Engineering and Applied Science

University at Buffalo

- 2006–2011 Professor of Chemical and Biological Engineering; Dean, School of Engineering and Applied Sciences
- 2011 Interim Provost

Binghamton University

- 2012–2025 President
