= Donald Nieman =

American historian (born 1948)

Donald G. Nieman
- Born: 1948 (age 77–78); Iowa, United States
- Occupations: Historian, Academic administrator
- Employer: Binghamton University
- Known for: History of law and race relations in the United States
- Title: Professor of History and Provost Emeritus
- Spouse: Leigh Ann Wheeler
- Awards: Faculty Excellence Award (1998); Provost's Award for Research Excellence (1994)

Academic background
- Education: Drake University (B.A., 1970); Rice University (Ph.D., 1975)
- Thesis: To Set the Law in Motion: The Freedmen's Bureau and the Legal Rights of Blacks, 1865–1868 (1975)
- Doctoral advisor: Harold M. Hyman

Donald G. Nieman (born 1948) is an American historian and academic administrator whose work focuses on the history of law, race relations, and civil rights in the United States. He serves as a Professor of History and the Provost Emeritus at Binghamton University, State University of New York.

== Early life and education ==
Nieman was born in Iowa in 1948, where he remained until adulthood. He attended Drake University where he earned a Bachelor of Arts degree, and graduated Phi Beta Kappa in 1970. He completed his Ph.D. at Rice University in 1975 with a dissertation titled, To Set the Law in Motion: The Freedmen's Bureau and the Legal Rights of Blacks, 1865–1868 under the supervision of Harold M. Hyman.

== Academic career ==
Nieman began his academic career as an instructor at Kansas State University in 1974 and became an associate professor in 1980. He held visiting positions at Hunter College (1984–85) and at Brooklyn College (1990–91) as the Daniel M. Lyons Distinguished Professor. From 1989 to 1994, he also held positions as an associate professor and a professor at Clemson University while coordinating the graduate program.

In 1994, Nieman joined Bowling Green State University as a Professor and as the Chair of the History Department. From 2000 to 2008, Nieman served as Dean of the College of Arts and Sciences. During his tenure at Bowling Green, he developed BGeXperience, a first-year program that focuses on teaching students to think critically about values. The program earned national recognition, with the university being cited in U.S. News & World Report for its approach to general education.

== Binghamton University leadership ==
Nieman started working at Binghamton University in 2008 as Dean of Harpur College of Arts and Sciences. In interviews, Nieman described Binghamton University as having a "uniform commitment to excellence" and a balance between teaching and research. "We have a faculty that is seriously committed to teaching undergraduate students even as they are engaged in cutting-edge research," he observed. Nieman characterized this balance as central to the institution's culture.

By this time, Binghamton had grown from its origins as a small liberal arts college to a university with 15,000 students, professional schools, and over 20 doctoral programs. As Dean, Nieman created a first-year writing program, launched the Harpur Fellows Program for student civic engagement, and established the Institute for Advanced Studies in the Humanities.

In 2012, Nieman was appointed Provost and Executive Vice President for Academic Affairs. During his decade-long tenure as the university's chief academic officer, he oversaw institutional growth and development, guided by what he and President Harvey Stenger called their "North Star": getting bigger not just to get bigger, but to get better—growth designed to serve students and the community more effectively while building the university's reputation.

Among his major initiatives was the creation of Transdisciplinary Areas of Excellence (TAEs), which represented a new approach to faculty hiring and research collaboration. He provided leadership for establishing the School of Pharmacy and Pharmaceutical Sciences, which he identified as a top priority in early meetings with President Stenger. Working with founding dean Gloria Meredith, he oversaw the design and construction of a $60 million facility. The school welcomed its first Doctor of Pharmacy students in 2017, with the inaugural class graduating in 2021.

The success of the pharmacy school led to further expansion of health sciences programs. Nieman oversaw the transformation of the Decker School of Nursing into the Decker College of Nursing and Health Sciences, relocating it to Johnson City near the pharmacy school and the largest clinical placement sites. Making use of the Upstate Revitalization Initiative, the university converted an abandoned factory into a new facility. Under Dean Mario Ortiz's leadership, the college expanded its scope to include rehabilitation sciences and public health programs, creating what Nieman described as "a bigger footprint in the health sciences" that would enhance research, serve the community, and eventually generate revenue for the university.

During his provostship, the university achieved re-accreditation by the Middle States Commission on Higher Education with no recommendations for follow-up and was designated an R-1 University (Doctoral Universities—Very high research activity) by the Carnegie Foundation. The Freshman Research Immersion Program (FRI) was established with support from the Howard Hughes Medical Institute and other funders. Reforms in calculus instruction were implemented, resulting in a reduction in failure rates. Student retention and graduation rates improved during this period. The Institute for Genocide and Mass Atrocity Prevention and the Ellyn Kaschak Institute for Social Justice for Women and Girls were established through major philanthropic gifts.

== Research ==
His work began with focused studies on the Reconstruction era and its aftermath. In "Andrew Johnson, the Freedmen's Bureau, and the Problem of Equal Rights, 1865–1866" (The Journal of Southern History, 1978), he investigated the political conflicts that undermined federal efforts to protect African American civil rights. This early research built upon his doctoral dissertation, which he revised and published as his first book, To Set the Law in Motion: The Freedmen's Bureau and the Legal Rights of Blacks, 1865-1868 (1979). His article "Black Political Power and Criminal Justice: Washington County, Texas, 1868-1884" (The Journal of Southern History, 1989) used local history to illuminate how African Americans exercised political power during Reconstruction and how white supremacists systematically dismantled it.

Nieman's most influential work, Promises to Keep: African Americans and the Constitutional Order, 1776 to the Present (1991), has been described as "the first Afrocentric history of the U.S. Constitution." The book investigates the paradoxical relationship between African Americans and constitutional law, showing how the Constitution has been both a tool of oppression and a vehicle for liberation. A second edition, published in 2020, incorporates developments through the rise of the Black Lives Matter movement.

His regional studies have provided insights into post-Civil War race relations. "African Americans and the Meaning of Freedom: Washington County, Texas as a Case Study, 1865–1886" (Chicago-Kent Law Review, 1994) demonstrated how formerly enslaved people understood and pursued freedom in practical terms.

In "From Slaves to Citizens: African-Americans, Rights Consciousness, and Reconstruction" (Cardozo Law Review, 1995), he documented how African Americans developed sophisticated understandings of constitutional rights during Reconstruction.

As an editor, he has produced several collections, including The Constitution, Law, and American Life: Critical Aspects of the Nineteenth-Century Experience (1992) and Local Matters: Race, Crime, and Justice in the Nineteenth-Century South (2001), co-edited with Christopher Waldrep. He also edited Freedom, Racism, and Reconstruction: Collected Writings of LaWanda Cox (1997), bringing together the work of one of the most influential historians of the Reconstruction era.

Nieman has also written about higher education. With Louis I. Katzner, he published "Making values education: Everyone's business" (About Campus, 2006), which discussed innovative approaches to values education developed during his time at Bowling Green State University.

In 2024, Anthem Press published his book, The Path to Paralysis: How American Politics Became Nasty, Dysfunctional, and a Threat to the Republic, which examines the transformation of American political culture from the Great Society era to the present. The 400-page work traces nearly 60 years of American history through a chronological narrative organized around presidential administrations from 1964 onward. Nieman argues that while political nastiness began in the late 1960s, true polarization only emerged after 2008. He identifies multiple factors contributing to this development: the transformation of the media landscape from mainstream sources to fragmented echo chambers, economic disruption that has left many Americans feeling alienated, gerrymandering that creates safe seats and reduces incentives for compromise, and the deliberate exploitation of cultural divisions by political leaders. He continues to advance these theories as a public intellectual beyond his academic publications.

The book grew out of discussions with his students in HIST 104 (Modern American History), a course he co-taught for many years with his wife, Professor Leigh Ann Wheeler, as well as conversations with his son Brady about generational perspectives on political dysfunction. Nieman described the work as "a history of American political and social and cultural life that parallels my own life," beginning when he became politically conscious in 1964 and continuing to the present day. In the work, Nieman studies how compromise between political opponents remained possible through the early 2000s, citing examples such as Reagan and Tip O'Neill's Social Security reforms and Clinton and Gingrich's attempted Medicare and Social Security overhaul. He particularly emphasizes the role of media transformation—from three major networks to today's fractured information ecosystem—in enabling current levels of polarization.

Nieman served as Secretary-Treasurer of the American Society for Legal History from 1997 to 2000, and was the program chair for American Society for Legal History, the Southern Historical Association, and the National Policy History Conference. He has also served as a grant screener for the American Council of Learned Societies.

He served 22 years in senior administrative positions, including eight years as dean at Bowling Green State University, four years as dean at Binghamton University, and ten years as Binghamton's provost.

Nieman has expressed particular concern about the impact of political dysfunction on younger generations, noting that those who grow up viewing extreme polarization as normal may lose faith in democratic institutions. He has also articulated a vision for the future of higher education, arguing that universities must help students "learn how to learn" to prepare them for a world increasingly dependent on knowledge and lifelong learning. Despite his concerns about political polarization, he has maintained optimism about the possibility of overcoming division, pointing to historical examples of political opponents finding common ground and arguing that voters must demand that politicians engage in good-faith compromise to address the nation's challenges. He views higher education as crucial for preparing citizens who can maintain traditions of civil disagreement and peaceful resolution of differences.

== Awards and honors ==
=== Awards ===
- The Faculty Excellence Award from Bowling Green State University's College of Arts & Sciences (1998)
- The Provost's Award for Research Excellence from Clemson University (1994)

=== Fellowships and notable grants ===
- Fellow of the American Council of Learned Societies
- The National Endowment for the Humanities
- Golieb Fellowship, New York University School
- Research grants from the American Historical Association and the American Bar Foundation

== Personal life ==
Nieman is married to Leigh Ann Wheeler, a historian who is also a member of the Binghamton University History Department faculty. They married in 2001 and have one son.

== Selected publications ==
=== Books ===
- The Path to Paralysis: How American Politics Became Nasty, Dysfunctional, and a Threat to the Republic (Anthem Press, October 2024)
- Promises to Keep: African Americans and the Constitutional Order, 1776 to the Present (Oxford University Press, 1991; 2nd ed., 2020)
- To Set the Law in Motion: The Freedmen's Bureau and the Legal Rights of Blacks, 1865–1868 (Kraus, 1979)

=== Edited volumes ===
- Local Matters: Race, Crime, and Justice in the Nineteenth-Century South (University of Georgia Press, 2001) – co-edited with Christopher Waldrep
- Freedom, Racism, and Reconstruction: Collected Writings of LaWanda Cox (University of Georgia Press, 1997)
- African American Life in the Post-Emancipation South, 1861–1900 (Garland, 1994)
- The Constitution, Law and American Life: Critical Aspects of the Nineteenth-Century Experience (University of Georgia Press, 1992)

=== Selected articles ===
- "After the Movement: African Americans and Civil Rights since 1910." In Upon these Shores, pp. 389–403. Routledge, 2013.
- "Making values education: Everyone's business." About Campus 11, no. 5 (2006): 16–23. doi:10.1002/abc.182 (with Louis I. Katzner)
- "The Rise of Jim Crow, 1880–1920." A Companion to the American South (2002): 336–347. doi:10.1002/9780470996300 (with James Beeby)
- "From Slaves to Citizens: African-Americans, Rights Consciousness, and Reconstruction." Cardozo Law Review 17 (1995): 2115–2225.
- "African Americans and the Meaning of Freedom: Washington County, Texas as a Case Study, 1865–1886." Chicago-Kent Law Review 70 (1994): 541–582.
- "Promises to Keep: African-Americans and the Constitutional Order, 1776 to the Present." Legal Studies Forum 16, no. 1 (1992).
- "Black Political Power and Criminal Justice: Washington County, Texas, 1868–1884." The Journal of Southern History 55, no. 3 (1989): 391–420. JSTOR 2208403
- "Andrew Johnson, the Freedmen's Bureau, and the Problem of Equal Rights, 1865–1866." The Journal of Southern History 44, no. 3 (1978): 399–420. JSTOR 2208049
