= Binghamton University basketball scandal =

2009 misconduct scandal

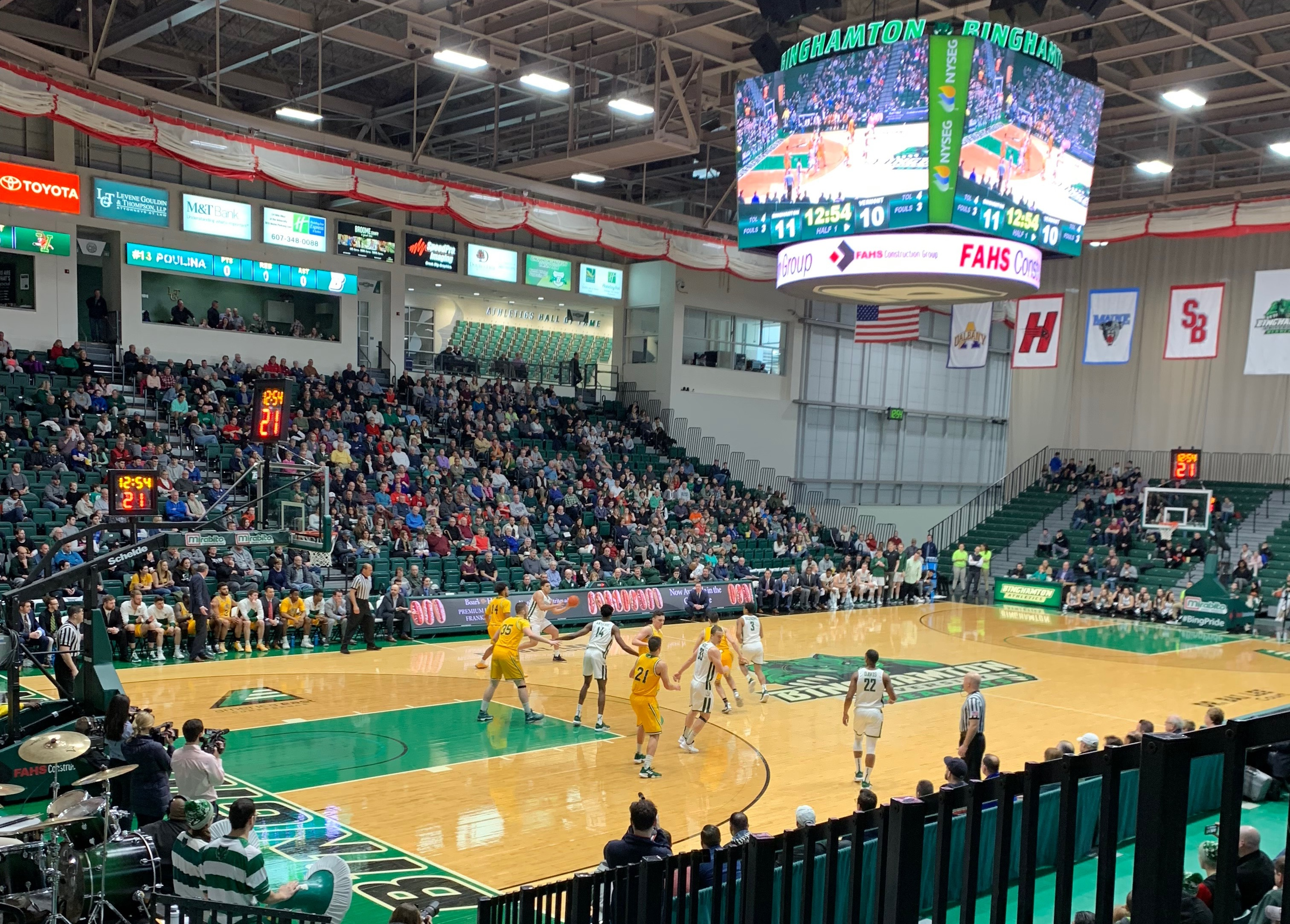
A men's basketball game at Binghamton University, the site of the scandal

The Binghamton University basketball scandal refers to a series of incidents that occurred as Binghamton University compromised its integrity in order to make the Bearcats men's basketball program more competitive in Division I. Numerous Binghamton players were arrested and dismissed from the team in the fall of 2009, continuing a troubling trend of misconduct from basketball players at the university. The arrests led to an investigation by the State University of New York (SUNY), Binghamton's parent institution, which found that Binghamton's administration had significantly lowered its admissions standards for prospective recruits under pressure from men's head coach Kevin Broadus and his staff. It also detailed several potential NCAA violations by Broadus and his staff. Numerous Binghamton professors admitted to academic fraud, having changed grades for basketball players upon pressure from members of the athletic department.

The scandal resulted in Broadus' suspension in October 2009 and eventual resignation a year later. It also resulted in the resignation of the school's athletic director Joel Thirer, the firing of two assistant coaches, and the dismissal of six players from the team. Due to the fallout from the scandal, Binghamton elected to sit out postseason play in 2010. The SUNY investigation was forwarded to the NCAA, who discovered that Binghamton had committed two secondary violations but no major violations. Binghamton University's president, Lois B. DeFleur, announced her plans to retire when it became public that the report of the findings from an investigation would implicate her as being responsible for the impropriety.

Following the scandal, Binghamton's men's basketball program was left in ruin. The team has yet to record a winning overall or conference record since, bottoming out during the 2011–12 season when the Bearcats finished 2–29, losing their first 26 games, for the worst record in program history.

== Background ==
The success of Binghamton had been one of the great stories of the 2008–09 basketball season. In just the school's eighth season as a Division I program, Broadus led the Bearcats to a school record-tying 23 wins, a tie for first place in the America East Conference, and the school's first conference tournament title in 63 years. In the first round of the NCAA Tournament, the No. 15-seeded Bearcats played No. 2 seed Duke, losing 86–62. Broadus was named the America East coach of the year, earning a contract extension through the 2013–14 season.

However, many were concerned that Binghamton had cut too many corners in its bid for basketball glory, sacrificing its reputation as a strong academic institution in the process. Management professor Dennis Lasser, the school's former faculty athletics representative, helped lead the effort to move Binghamton from Division III to Division I in 2001 but lost his job after Broadus was hired as head coach. Lasser, a vocal critic of the program's direction, was replaced by Sandra McMichael, a close friend of DeFleur's. Lasser claimed that after the coaching change, Binghamton had lowered its standards for admitting prospective basketball players to the bare minimum required by the NCAA. ESPN analyst Tom Brennan, a former coach at Binghamton's America East conference-mate Vermont, told The New York Times that "It certainly appears to me that Binghamton has decided they’re going to take a lot of risks, and it also appears that it hasn’t worked out. Even if they win an America East championship, what is it worth?"

On March 18, 2009, a day before Binghamton was set to take on Duke in the 2009 NCAA tournament, Elizabeth Williams, a major gifts officer for Binghamton athletics, accused associate athletic director Jason Siegel of grabbing her breast in an elevator. The accusation was amongst larger claims of "egregious acts of sexual misconduct" in the Binghamton athletic department, which included innuendo and sexist comments in the workplace. Williams sued Binghamton in July, alleging that athletic officials called her a sexual "plaything", commanded her to dress provocatively for fundraisers and asked how much money it would cost to have sex with her.

=== Recruitment controversies ===
As an assistant coach at George Washington and Georgetown, Broadus recruited players from Lutheran Christian Academy, a school in Philadelphia widely accused of being a diploma mill. One of those players, Mike Egerson, transferred to Lutheran Christian after earning only a 1.33 grade point average at his Delaware high school and garnering an SAT score in the 600s. Shortly before Broadus was hired at Binghamton, the NCAA announced it would no longer accept coursework from Lutheran Christian and several other suspected diploma mills. However, Binghamton continued to recruit players with a history at Lutheran Christian, accepting center Theo Davis and guard Devon McBride. Davis, a transfer from Gonzaga University, had a misdemeanor marijuana possession charge on his record.

Several players on Binghamton's 2008–09 championship roster had transferred to the team while facing academic problems at their former schools. Guard D.J. Rivera was forced to sit out a semester at Saint Joseph's University due to academic problems. Guard Malik Alvin left the University of Texas at El Paso because of academic concerns and transferred to junior college before coming to Binghamton. Guard Emanuel "Tiki" Mayben initially signed with Syracuse University before he was deemed academically ineligible coming out of high school and also came to Binghamton as a junior college transfer.

=== Initial backlash ===
In May 2008, sophomore center Miladin Kovacevic, who was recruited by Broadus' predecessor Al Walker, beat a fellow student Bryan Steinhauer into a three-month coma and fled to his native Serbia with the help of two Serbian diplomats. The assault garnered severe negative media attention and became the subject of an ESPN E:60 special which aired in May 2009.

In November 2008, Alvin was arrested for stealing Magnum condoms from a local Walmart even as condoms were available for free on campus. While being chased by security officers, Alvin assaulted a 66-year-old woman, giving her a concussion. He was charged with petty larceny and third-degree assault, but pleaded not guilty. Alvin was suspended for three games, but charges were subsequently dropped and he returned to the lineup for the rest of the season. In January 2009, senior guard Dwayne Jackson was suspended indefinitely from the team for an undisclosed violation. Broadus himself was suspended for one game in 2008 after shoving Albany assistant head coach Chad O'Donnell during a postgame handshake.

The arrests and suspensions of Binghamton basketball players began to draw backlash within the community. Former Binghamton associate athletic director Tim Schum said, "They’re on a very slippery slope. There is a double standard for what basketball will put up with compared to the standards for other sports. I don’t know if it’s written, but it’s certainly understood."

A New York Times report in February 2009 revealed that Sally Dear, an adjunct lecturer at Binghamton's human development department, taught three basketball players in her human development class who habitually missed classes and appointments or showed up late to class while leaving early. Dear admitted that the trio of players repeatedly halted class with their disruptive behavior and alleged that Ed Scott, an associate athletic director, harassed her regarding her treatment of her athlete students. Dear would later reveal in 2019 that an assistant dean suggested that she change the poor grades of the basketball players in her class, with knowledge that other professors at the university were already doing the same.

McBride, who would leave the team after an argument with Broadus, told The New York Times that many of his teammates frequently drank alcohol and smoked marijuana, but Broadus made no effort to rein in their off-the-court behavior.

These concerns led America East commissioner Patrick Nero to talk with school president Lois DeFleur and athletic director Joel Thirer about the team's behavior. The America East's other coaches reportedly voiced their displeasure with the way Broadus ran the program by bumping D.J. Rivera, the conference's leading scorer, to a Second Team All-Conference selection in 2009. The move was believed to be made as a silent protest of Binghamton's recruiting process and the suspicious approval of Rivera's transfer waiver, which allowed him to play without sitting out a season.

=== Arrests and mass dismissals ===
On September 13, 2009, Binghamton University police stopped Mayben for speeding and discovered marijuana in his car. Mayben told the police that the marijuana belonged to his teammate David Fine, who had been questioned by police after being caught with two grams of marijuana in his dorm room less than a week earlier. Mayben was ultimately cited for speeding and unlawful possession of marijuana.

On September 14, a Binghamton student reported that her debit card was stolen and used illegally to purchase numerous items, including a television set. After questioning player Chretien Lukusa and reviewing store surveillance footage, Binghamton University police identified Rivera, Alvin and Paul Crosby as the culprits. A fourth basketball player, Corey Chandler, confessed to the police about his role in the crime. Rivera stated that he had found the card at a party and used it to make purchases with his teammates. The Kaye report would reveal that Lukusa informed the victim of a potential illegal purchase on her debit card and went to the police station on his own accord to identify his teammates on the surveillance footage; in response, Alvin posted on Facebook, "Chretien Lakusa is a Rat" [sic].

On September 23, Mayben, Binghamton's starting point guard and second-leading scorer, was arrested and charged with possessing and selling crack cocaine. Broadus, saying he'd "done all [he] could" to help Mayben, kicked him off the team the next day.

On September 25, Broadus announced that five other players — Rivera, Alvin, Crosby, Chandler and Fine — had been kicked off the team for unspecified violations of team rules, which was later revealed as the debit card incident per the Kaye report. Within 48 hours, Binghamton had lost its three top scorers from the previous season. With only seven scholarship players and no experienced guards, it was widely believed that the Bearcats' 2009-10 season was over before it even started. Lasser said that these dismissals amounted to an "implosion" of the Bearcat program. Although Broadus claimed the decision was his alone, the dismissals came on the same day that SUNY chancellor Nancy Zimpher demanded that DeFleur give her a full accounting of what was being done to address Mayben's arrest and other unspecified incidents. Zimpher was known for having little tolerance for athletic misconduct. While president of the University of Cincinnati, she had forced longtime basketball coach Bob Huggins to resign in 2005. Although Huggins had taken Cincinnati to heights it had not seen since the 1960s, Zimpher had been displeased with the team's poor academic performance and misbehavior off the court.

On September 29, Dear was told she was being let go as part of a cost-cutting measure. However, Dear alleged that she had been fired due to her February interview with The New York Times which brought to light how she was being pressured to give preferential treatment to disruptive basketball players. Dear's colleagues admitted to her that they had changed grades for athletes.

On September 30, Thirer resigned as athletic director, a post he had held since 1989. Despite his role in the scandal, he would be inducted into Binghamton's Hall of Fame in 2011.

== Investigation and Kaye report ==
=== Audit announced ===
On October 2, Zimpher announced plans for a full audit of Binghamton's athletic department. Significantly, Zimpher stated that the audit would be overseen by the SUNY board of trustees, and not by Binghamton itself. On the same day, it was announced that Dear had been rehired. The probe was directed by Judith Kaye, the former chief judge of the New York Court of Appeals.

=== Broadus suspended ===
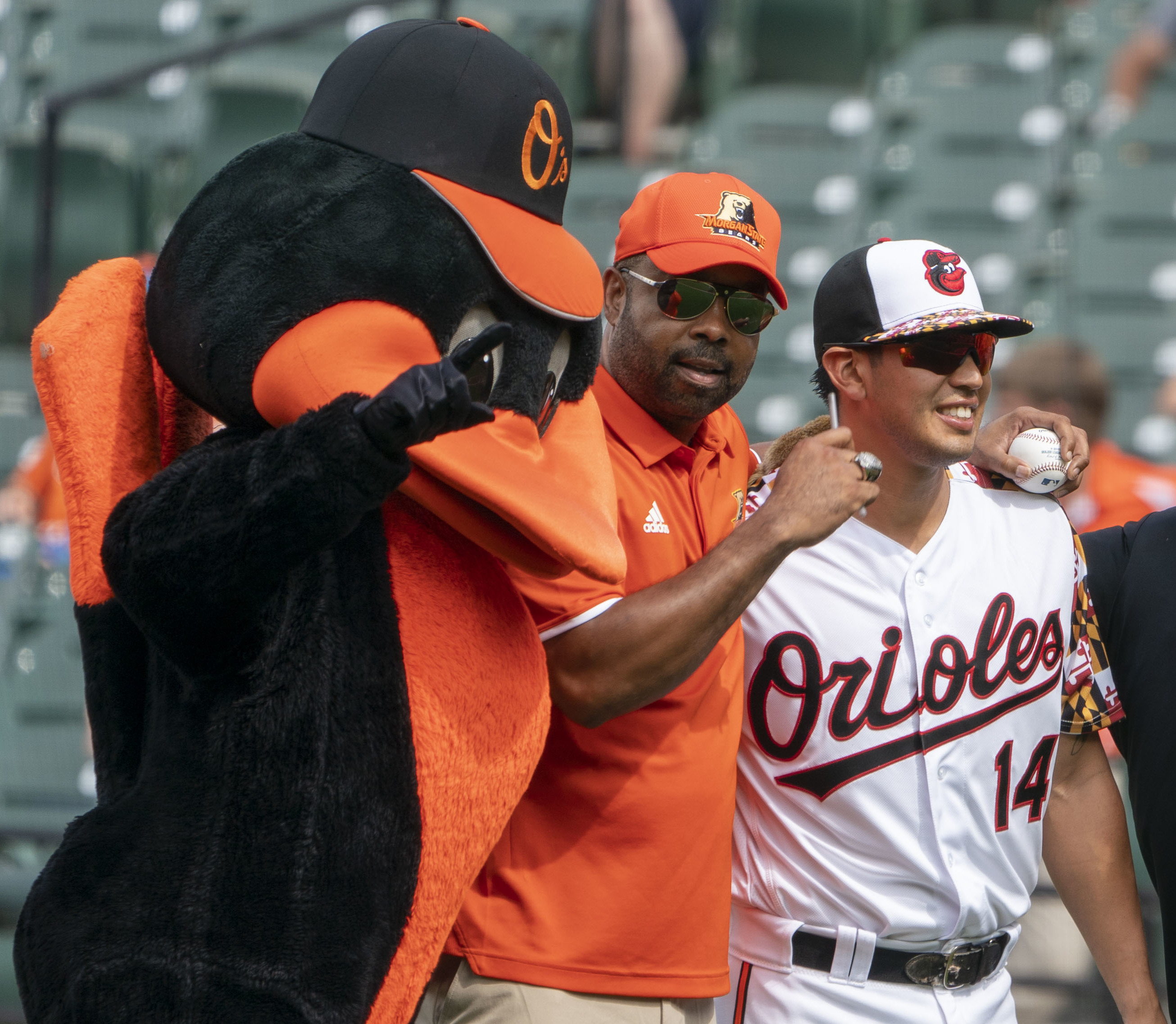
Broadus (center) in 2019

On October 14, Binghamton suspended Broadus indefinitely with pay. In announcing the suspension, acting athletic director Jim Norris cited numerous "incidents of concern." Assistant coach Mark Macon, a former star at Temple, was named interim head coach. The announcement came a week after Broadus publicly apologized to several of his athletic department colleagues for bringing "shame" to Binghamton by not properly controlling his program. Broadus was in the center of another controversy after he admitted to contacting recruits on the first day of the period when coaches are not allowed to speak with prospects that they are scouting.

=== Kaye report and findings ===
On February 11, 2010, Kaye released her findings in a 99-page report. Kaye found that under pressure from Broadus, Binghamton had lowered its standards for admitting basketball players to the NCAA minimum. In bowing to this pressure, Kaye said, DeFleur, Thirer and other officials had significantly compromised Binghamton's academic standards even though Binghamton was not prepared to take in this many academically marginal students. Basketball players had been given credit for courses titled "Theories of Softball" and "Bowling I".

According to the report, the mass dismissal of September 25, 2009 had not been Broadus' decision, but was ordered by Thirer. The dismissed players had been involved in several incidents reported to Binghamton University police, including the aforementioned marijuana offenses and the debit card theft, which were made public information for the first time. School officials had been willing to let Broadus handle the raft of discipline problems at first. However, after Mayben's September 23 arrest, Thirer called Broadus into his office and told him that Rivera, Alvin, Chandler, Crosby and Fine all had to go. Rivera, Alvin, Crosby and Chandler were suspected of stealing another student's debit card and using it to buy several items. The report also revealed a text message exchange between Broadus and assistant coach Mark Hsu in which the two discussed coaching the players on what to tell school police during the investigation of the stolen debit card. The police believed that Rivera was taking the fall for the debit card incident to cover for his teammates and told Hsu that the players had lied in their sworn statements.

The Kaye report found evidence of potential academic fraud by Broadus and his staff. In a text message exchange between Alvin and Hsu, Alvin asked Hsu to rewrite a paper for him because Alvin had copied it off the Internet. In another, Alvin copied another paper off the Internet, but added a conclusion in his own words on advice from Hsu. Broadus was also accused of having professors change players' grades, which was never proven to be true. Alvin and Hsu also discussed what appeared to reference cash payments.

The report revealed that Binghamton men's basketball players had a GPA of 2.15 for the fall 2009 semester and a 2.21 cumulative GPA, but the school was able to sweep this information under the rug by repeatedly stating that the overall cumulative GPA of all Binghamton student-athletes "has exceeded 3.0 in 12 of our 15 semesters in Division I." In a meeting with admissions officials, an athletic official asked, "Why do you care if we take six players who don’t attend classes?" The report also stated that following Binghamton's men's basketball championship in 2009, DeFleur put increased pressure on coaches of other sports to produce championships, stating that the university needed more flexibility in admitting student-athletes with poor academics.

After Mayben had been kicked off the team, the report recounted an incident in which Mayben swore to "bring down" the basketball program by going to ESPN and The New York Times with information about Broadus paying for junior college transfers and cell phones. Mayben would later recant the allegations, and all coaches and players denied giving or receiving improper benefits.

The report also detailed Binghamton's contentious relationship with the rest of the America East conference. Other schools observed Binghamton players taunting the crowd, using foul language and engaging in on-court shouting matches with assistant coaches during games. During the June 2009 America East meetings, the eight other athletic directors in the conference confronted Thirer about their unhappiness with Binghamton's conduct and Rivera's immediate transfer waiver grant, still frustrated over Thirer's refusal to admit Binghamton had acted inappropriately. The America East's anger at Binghamton escalated again after Broadus' contract extension and Binghamton's acceptance of Chandler, who was admitted to the university 13 days after being kicked off the Rutgers basketball team due to multiple disciplinary violations. By the fall of 2009, several of the conference's athletic directors and presidents mulled the idea of kicking Binghamton out of the America East Conference.

Kaye recommended, among other things, that SUNY appoint an "athletic oversight officer" for the entire SUNY system, reporting directly to the chancellor.

In a conference call with reporters, Zimpher said, "I am disappointed that a great institution like Binghamton University would, in any way, because of its athletic program, compromise its terrific academic reputation." She also promised sweeping changes.

== Fallout ==
Macon was forced to hold tryouts in October to replenish his decimated roster, adding Mikey Horn, Preston Pena, Javon Ralling, and Charlie Fackler to the roster. He also had to deal with two of his assistants, Hsu and Julius Allen, being fired midseason, leaving him with only one assistant coach. Under the circumstances, he kept Binghamton fairly competitive, managing to finish with a .500 record in America East play and 13–18 overall, with seven of their losses by 10 points or less.

On March 1, DeFleur announced that the Bearcats would sit out the 2010 conference tournament and were withdrawing from postseason consideration. She said that given the current turmoil in the program, "it is not appropriate that we play in this year's postseason." Although Nero said the decision was Binghamton's alone, two America East sources told the Times that the league's other members did not want the Bearcats in the tournament and pressured them to withdraw, reinforcing the notion that the America East was seriously considering expelling Binghamton from the conference.

Brennan, who had been critical of Binghamton's athletic program for multiple years, questioned "At what price glory? Not only have they embarrassed themselves and the university, but they’ve embarrassed the America East as well." A group of eighteen Binghamton professors signed a statement pushing the university to drop down from Division I, condemning Binghamton's president for her role in the scandal. "Lois B. DeFleur’s two-decades-long tenure as president of Binghamton University has ended in real harm to the university’s reputation and pride," the statement read.

Zimpher eventually assigned SUNY’s interim provost, David K. Lavallee, to lead an overall effort for the SUNY system to ensure that academics remain the highest priority; and Charles R. Westgate, a professor in the Department of Electrical and Computer Engineering at Binghamton, as a special adviser for academics and athletics for the SUNY system: moves some critics of the over-emphasis on athletics decried as insufficient. Zimpher also announced that while Broadus will not return as coach, a permanent replacement will not be hired until the school has a permanent president and athletic director.

On March 26, Broadus filed a racial discrimination complaint with the New York State Division of Human Rights. Broadus claimed that he was being treated more harshly than other Binghamton coaches whose players had been arrested simply because he was the only minority coach at the school.

The Kaye report was forwarded to the NCAA, which could have issued its own sanctions in addition to Binghamton's own decision to pull out of postseason play. On October 18, the NCAA found that Hsu had committed two secondary violations by providing impermissible travel to two players. However, due to lack of cooperation from involved parties, the NCAA was unable to find any major violations. Due to the lack of major violations, Broadus' lawyer asked for his reinstatement, but Zimpher reiterated that he would not return as coach. On October 28, Broadus announced he was filing a federal discrimination lawsuit against Binghamton and SUNY. Hours later, the three parties reached a settlement in which Broadus would resign and take a $1.2 million buyout in return for dropping all legal action against Binghamton or SUNY.

In November 2011, senior Kyrie Sutton, the last remaining player from Binghamton's 2009 champion squad, was dismissed from the team after he was arrested for the misdemeanor of criminal possession of stolen property. It was Sutton's fourth legal incident since joining Binghamton. Nearly a year later, in October 2012, senior Javon Ralling and freshman Jordan Reed were suspended after both were arrested for disorderly conduct. Ralling was also charged with resisting arrest.

On April 30, 2012, Mark Macon was fired as head coach of the men's basketball team. Macon's Bearcats began the 2011–12 season with a 0–26 record, the last remaining winless team in Division I, and ended the regular season at 1–28 for the worst season in program history. In three seasons as head coach, Macon went 24–68 in his tenure.

In May 2014, Binghamton University became one of four New York universities, and the only SUNY, being investigated for suspected Title IX civil rights violations.

Binghamton's basketball program has never recovered from the scandal. From 2010 to 2020, the Bearcats amassed a record of 90–250 (.265), going 42–134 (.239) in America East conference play.
