= University of Missouri College of Health Sciences =

Academic program in Columbia, Missouri, US

Coordinates: 38°56′36.33″N 92°19′58.31″W

- Type: Public
- Established: 2000
- Parent institution: University of Missouri
- Affiliations: University of Missouri Health Care
- Dean: Kristofer Hagglund
- Students: 3,500 (2022)
- Location: Columbia, Missouri, United States
- Campus: Urban, college town
- Website: healthsciences.missouri.edu

The Mizzou College of Health Sciences is the University of Missouri system’s only school of health professions and the state’s only public health program located on a health sciences campus. Its mission is to improve the health and well-being of others.

The school is an important member of the University of Missouri Health System. Other members include the Sinclair School of Nursing, the School of Medicine, University Hospitals and Clinics and University Physicians.

== History ==
The School of Health Professions became an independent academic unit by action of the University of Missouri Board of Curators on December 14, 2000. Its programs have a long history, some dating back to the early 1900s, and have produced many professionals.

At the time of its establishment, the school consisted of five departments, including Clinical and Diagnostic Sciences; Health Psychology; Occupational Therapy; Physical Therapy; and Speech, Language and Hearing Sciences. Addressing the increasing health care needs of Missouri and across the nation, the school has continued to grow in programs to prepare professionals in health care, public health and social work.

Richard Oliver, a professor of pathology and anatomical science, was the founding dean of the school. He retired in 2013 to become president of the Association of Schools of Allied Health Professions. Kristofer Hagglund, who had served as associate dean since 2001, was named dean in 2013.

The School of Health Professions changed its name to the College of Health Sciences at the start of the 2023-24 academic year. In 2022, more than eleven percent of MU students are in the School of Health Professions.
