= University of Missouri Women's and Children's Hospital =

Hospital in Columbia, Missouri, U.S.

University of Missouri Women's Hospital
- University of Missouri Health Care
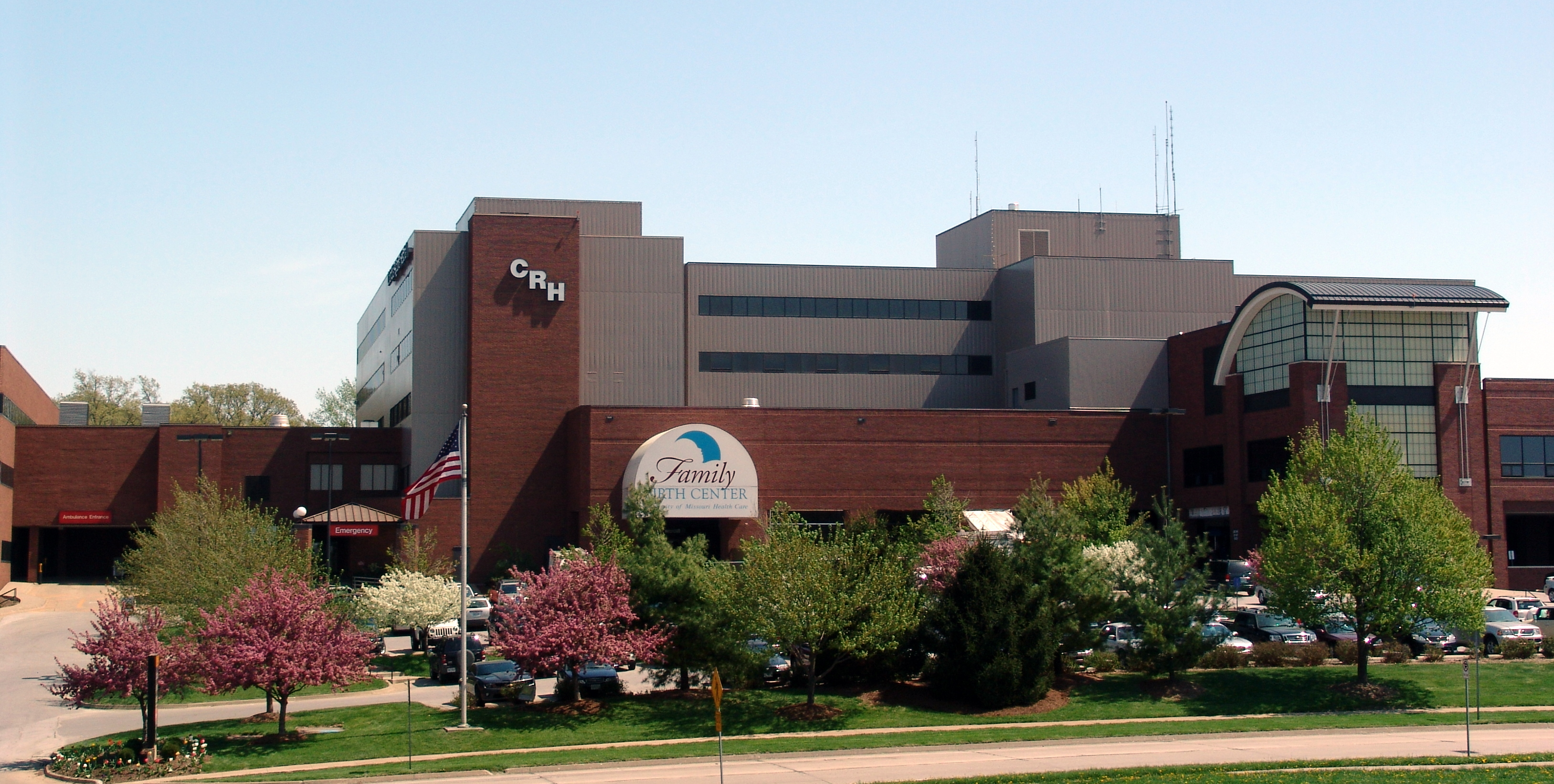

Geography
- Location: 404 N. Keene St., Columbia, Missouri, United States
- Coordinates: 38°57′27″N 92°17′18″W

Organization
- Type: Specialized
- Affiliated university: University of Missouri

Services
- Emergency department: Level II
- Beds: 157

History
- Former names: Columbia Regional Hospital, University of Missouri Women's and Children's Hospital
- Founded: 1974; 52 years ago

Links
- Website: www.muhealth.org
- Lists: Hospitals in the United States
- Other links: University of Missouri School of Medicine

The University of Missouri Women's Hospital, formerly University of Missouri Women's Hospital, is the only hospital in Missouri exclusively dedicated to the health of women. The hospital was formerly home to MU Children's Hospital, and is currently home to MU Women's Center, and the Family Birth Center. The Women's Hospital no longer has a pediatric Emergency Room and inpatient services, having moved to University Hospital. In Fiscal Year 2009, 1,793 babies were born in the Family Birth Center. The hospital has the da Vinci minimally invasive surgical robotic system. It is located in eastern Columbia near the interchange of Interstate 70 and U.S. 63 at 404 North Keene Street.

== University of Missouri Women's Health Center ==
The MU Women's Health Center provides comprehensive care for all stages of a women's life. The Family Birth Center features 27 antepartum and postpartum rooms, twelve labor and delivery rooms, two surgical suites and a newborn observation unit. Each private patient room includes a bathroom, a sleeper sofa for guests and special amenities for new mothers. An obstetrician/gynecologist is available 24 hours a day, seven days a week to provide care at the Family Birth Center, which delivered 1,863 babies in Fiscal Year 2010.

Mothers-to-be with high-risk pregnancies will benefit from the expansion of maternal-fetal medicine and ultrasound services connected to the hospital and located on the fourth floor of the Keene Medical Building. The new facility features more than 5,000 square feet (460 m^{2}), six exam rooms, five ultrasound suites and a non-stress testing suite.

The Women's Health Center also includes consultation and management of all aspects of reproductive endocrinology and fertility for couples experiencing difficulty conceiving, a full range of diagnostic and therapeutic services for women with pelvic floor dysfunction and urinary incontinence, comprehensive care for women with gynecologic cancers, minimally invasive gynecological surgical care, including robotic surgery, and women's wellness services.

== University of Missouri Children's Hospital ==

The University of Missouri Children's Hospital, also known as the MU Children's Hospital, was the largest pediatric health care facility in Mid-Missouri. More than 100 physicians provided care in more than 30 pediatric specialties including cardiology, cancer and surgical specialties, radiology, a pediatric sleep lab, and plastic and reconstructive surgery. One of the few remaining pediatric services remaining at Women's is the highest level Neonatal Intensive Care Unit (Level III). The sophisticated Pediatric Intensive Care Unit (PICU), an adolescent unit, a short-stay center, a general pediatrics unit, an adolescent game room, a pediatric play room, a patient playground, and a school for children who are in the hospital for a long period of time have been moved to the main University Hospital Campus. In 2009, more than 4,000 patients were admitted to Children's Hospital. Clinic visits numbered nearly to 42,500.

The University of Missouri Healthcare System is transitioning to one central campus, with plans for a Children's Tower by Summer of 2024. The Pediatric Emergency Room. Pediatric Inpatient Services, and Surgeries and Procedures have been relocated to University Hospital, until the new Children's Tower is completed. The Children's Cancer and Blood Disorders Unit has been relocated to the Ellis Fischel Cancer Center within the University Hospital.

The Children's Hospital Critical Care Transport Service is the only service of its kind outside of St. Louis and Kansas City. The service cares for children of all ages from premature infants to adolescents.

A Ronald McDonald House is nearby.

== History ==
In 1972, physicians from Columbia Orthopaedic Group joined with a number of other physicians from around Columbia to build Columbia Regional Hospital. Construction began after the land was purchased on February 7, 1972, and the new Columbia Regional Hospital and 33,000-square-foot (3,100 m^{2}) orthopedic clinic to the south opened in 1974.

Columbia Orthopedic Group leased the 265-bed facility to Medenco, which later became Lifemark Corp. Ten years later, Lifemark purchased the hospital and then sold it to American International Hospital Corp., which in turn became Tenet Healthcare Corporation. In 1999 University of Missouri Health Care purchased Columbia Regional Hospital from Tenet Healthcare for $34.55 million.

=== Change to Women's and Children's Hospital ===
In September 2010, University of Missouri Children's Hospital moved to the Columbia Regional Hospital and the name was officially changed to University of Missouri Women's and Children's Hospital. More than $12 million was spent to renovate the former building including the construction of two new entrances, one child-friendly and one specifically for women.

=== New location ===
Future plans call for the hospital to be relocated to a new hospital near the University of Missouri Hospital. It is expected to open in 2024. The Ronald McDonald will be relocated near the new hospital.
