= University of Missouri-St. Louis Police Department =

- Common name: UMSL Police
- Abbreviation: UMSL PD

Agency overview
- Formed: 1963
- Employees: Authorized strength: 23 sworn officers

Jurisdictional structure
- Operations jurisdiction: Missouri, USA
- Population: 16000
- Legal jurisdiction: University of Missouri System property (primary); Missouri (secondary)
- General nature: Civilian police

Operational structure
- Headquarters: 1 University Boulevard St. Louis, Missouri 63121
- Agency executive: Dan Freet, Chief of Police
- Parent agency: University of Missouri-St. Louis

Website
- Official website

The University of Missouri-St. Louis Police Department (UMSL PD) is the law enforcement agency of the University of Missouri-St. Louis, a public research university located just outside the city of St. Louis, Missouri.

The University of Missouri-St. Louis Police Department is the 18th university in the country and the 5th Land Grant Institution Police Department to achieve CALEA's first credentialing program: the Law Enforcement Accreditation Program. (CALEA).

Police officers appointed by the University of Missouri System have the same power and authority held by peace officers of the state of Missouri. The agency's primary jurisdiction is UMSL property, which includes both the North and South campus, as well as other UMSL-owned or controlled properties.

UMSL police officers also have jurisdiction throughout the state of Missouri.

== History ==
In 1965, Police Chief James J. Nelson became the first Police Chief for the University of Missouri-St. Louis. Chief Nelson served with distinction from 1965 to 1981.

In 1982, Chief William Karabas became the second Police Chief for the university's Police Department. Chief Karabas served with distinction from 1982 - 1987.

The agency has been accredited by the Commission on Accreditation for Law Enforcement Agencies since 2000.

== Organization ==
=== Department structure ===
UMSL PD operates the following department bureaus:

- Bureau of Police Operations
  - Patrol
  - Lost and Found
  - Bike Patrol
  - Records
- Bureau of Special Operations
  - Detective and Investigative Section
  - Crime Prevention and Community Involvement Section
- Bureau of Standards and Technology
  - Communications

== Parking and transportation ==
The Parking & Transportation Division of Institutional Safety is located in the main office of the campus police building.

== Commissioned/sworn positions ==
UMSL PD uses the following ranks:

Title	Insignia
Chief of Police	
Captain	
Lieutenant	
Sergeant	
Police Officer	

== See also ==
- St. Louis County Police Department
- University of Missouri Police Department
