= University of Missouri System =

Public university system in Missouri

- Latin: Sigill Universitatis Missourien (Seal of University of Missouri)
- Type: Public
- Established: 1963
- Endowment: $2.925 billion (As of June 30, 2026)
- Budget: $5.340 billion (FY 2027)
- President: Mun Choi
- Faculty: 5,530 (Fall 2023)
- Total staff: 33,735 (FY 2025)
- Students: 78,839 (FY 2025)
- Location: Columbia; Kansas City; St. Louis; Rolla, Missouri, United States
- Campus: 20,019-acre (31.3 sq mi; 8,101.4 ha)
- Website: www.umsystem.edu

The University of Missouri System is a public university system of the state of Missouri in the United States.

The university system provides centralized administration for four universities, a health care system, an extension program, and ten research and technology parks. Over 78,800 students (FY 2025) are currently enrolled at its four campuses. The health care system operates several hospitals and clinics in central Missouri, while the extension program provides distance learning and other educational initiatives statewide.

The university system was created in 1963 when the University of Missouri (founded in 1839 in Columbia) and the Missouri School of Mines (now the Missouri University of Science and Technology, founded in 1870 in Rolla), were combined with the formerly private University of Kansas City (now University of Missouri–Kansas City, founded in 1933), and a newly created campus in suburban St. Louis (University of Missouri–St. Louis)

== Components ==
=== Universities ===
Mizzou logo

UMKC logo

Missouri S&T logo

UMSL logo

All four campuses are comprehensive, separately accredited, land-grant/research-intensive institutions offering undergraduate, graduate, and professional degree programs.

- University of Missouri (Mizzou, or MU) is the oldest campus, founded in Columbia in 1839. It is the largest university in the state with 31,041 students (Fall 2023). MU is considered the flagship of the system and offers over 270 degree programs through 20 schools and colleges, and is the only public university in Missouri that is a member of the Association of American Universities. Its Tigers athletic programs compete in the NCAA Division I Southeastern Conference.
- University of Missouri–Kansas City (UMKC), founded in 1933, is the largest school in the Kansas City metropolitan area with 15,238 (Fall 2026) students. It offers over 125 degree programs through 12 schools and colleges, but is best known for its programs in health sciences, entrepreneurship programs, and its Conservatory. Its athletic programs, the Kansas City Roos, compete in the NCAA Division I Summit League.
- Missouri University of Science and Technology (Missouri S&T or S&T) was founded in 1870 in Rolla. Currently enrolling 7,159 students (Fall 2023) it is the smallest campus in the system. 75 degrees and emphases are offered across a comprehensive range of programs in sciences, mathematics, liberal arts, humanities, and business, but most are focused on engineering. Its Miners athletic programs compete in the NCAA Division II Great Lakes Valley Conference (GLVC).
- University of Missouri–St. Louis (UMSL) was founded in 1963 in suburban St. Louis County. Enrolling 8,023 (Fall 2023). Over 80 degree programs are offered through nine schools and colleges, including Missouri's only College of Optometry. Its Tritons athletic programs compete alongside the Missouri S&T Miners in the GLVC.

=== Health care ===
The University of Missouri Health Care system operates several facilities in central Missouri, including University Hospital (the only Level I trauma center in central Missouri) and Ellis Fischel Cancer Center (the only hospital in Missouri specializing in cancer treatment). It is also closely affiliated with MU's School of Medicine, University of Missouri School of Health Professions, Sinclair School of Nursing, and University of Missouri-Kansas City Doctor of Pharmacy at MU satellite program.

It employs 4,515 employees.

=== Extension ===
Using science-based knowledge, University of Missouri Extension engages people to understand change, solve problems and make informed decisions.

MU Extension makes university education and information accessible for:

- Economic viability
- Empowered individuals
- Strong families and communities
- Healthy environments.

University of Missouri Extension is a partnership of the University of Missouri-Columbia, Lincoln University, the people of Missouri through county extension councils, and the National Institute for Food and Agriculture of the U.S. Department of Agriculture.

MU Extension offers distance learning, Mizzou Online, continuing education, evening classes. Programs in agriculture, natural resources, lawn and garden, home and consumer life, nutrition and health, families and relationships, community and leadership, business and careers, and emergency management are available through offices throughout the state.

=== Research and technology parks ===
As part of its economic development mission to support high-tech growth in Missouri, the UM System owns and operates 10 research parks throughout the state.

- Missouri Research Park is a 200-acre (80.9 ha) park in Weldon Spring created in 1985. It is home to over a dozen high-tech companies and helped catalyze a high-tech corridor along I-64.
- Technology Park at Fort Leonard Wood in St. Robert is the first technology park in the nation to be located on an active Army post. It houses the MRP Business Center, which was created to be a catalyst for partnerships between the military, corporations, and academia.
- Discovery Ridge, near Columbia, was established in 2005 on 114 acres (46.1 ha) of MU's South Farm, a 1,452-acre (588 ha) agricultural experiment station operated by MU's College of Agriculture, Food and Natural Resources. The park is jointly operated by the UM System's Office of Research and Economic Development and MU.
- Innovation Park in Rolla was announced in April 2007. The 56-acre (22.66 ha) former golf course will be "a research, development and office park project" jointly operated by the UM System's Office of Research and Economic Development and Missouri S&T.
- UMSL Research Park is a 100-acre (40.5 ha) park on UMSL's north campus. It is home to Express Scripts' new 315,000-square-foot (29,300 m^{2}) corporate headquarters, which opened in June 2007. The park is jointly operated by the UM System's Office of Research and Economic Development and UMSL.
- Innovative Technology Enterprises at UMSL is a business incubator that supports innovation in a wide-variety of fields including IT and the life sciences, providing the physical, mentoring, business development and computational resources required for startup companies to grow.
- Center for Emerging Technologies (CET) has provided the specialized facilities, knowledgeable support services, entrepreneur training programs, and access to capital needed to establish and develop next generation bioscience, medical and other advanced technology companies. CET's operations began in 1998 and are supported by the Missouri Technology Corporation, City of St. Louis and private donors
- Center of Research, Technology and Entrepreneurial Exchange (CORTEX) is an office and research district in mid-town St. Louis created by a nonprofit consortium formed by the University of Missouri-St. Louis, Saint Louis University, Washington University, Barnes-Jewish Hospital, and the Missouri Botanical Garden.
- Missouri Plant Science Center in Mexico is a partnership between the University of Missouri, Missouri Technology Corporation and the City of Mexico. The nearly 25,000 sq. ft. facility houses wet and dry labs, offices and has unique pilot/scale manufacturing capabilities to process soybeans and other plant-derived materials into value-added products.
- MU Life Science Business Incubator at Monsanto Place – The facility and incubation program in Columbia, MO, are operated by the Missouri Innovation Center, a public non-profit organization specializing in assistance to entrepreneurial technology firms.

=== Media ===
The University of Missouri Press was established in 1958 and today publishes over 70 titles per year, including several series such as the Missouri Biography Series. It also distributes books for the Missouri Historical Society Press.

The system also owns KOMU-TV, an affiliate of NBC serving mid-Missouri, and National Public Radio member stations in Columbia, St. Louis, and Kansas City.

=== Students organization ===
The Associated Students of the University of Missouri is a student run organization that represents the students of all four UM system campuses in Jefferson City and Washington, D.C. It was created in 1975 by the Missouri Students Association. ASUM has an internship program that lobbies the Missouri General Assembly on a regular basis pertaining to student issues including equalizing the Access Missouri tuition grant, increasing funding for the Bright Flight Scholarship, and giving the student representative to the UM Board of Curators a vote.

== Administration ==
=== Organization ===
The UM System is governed by a board of curators, consisting of nine members appointed by the governor with the advice and consent of the Missouri Senate. Curators serve six-year terms, staggered by three positions expiring every two years. Not more than one curator can be appointed from the same congressional district, and no more than five curators can belong to the same political party. In addition, there is a non-voting student representative to the board, likewise appointed and confirmed, who serves a two-year term. The post is rotated among the four universities. Presently, the post is held by Avery Welker from the S&T campus.

The board of curators selects the president of the system, who reports to the board along with the general counsel. Each campus is led by a chancellor who reports to the president, as does an executive vice president, four vice presidents, and a chief of staff. The president chairs the University of Missouri Health System advisory board.

=== Presidents ===
There have been ten presidents of UM System since its inception in 1963. Prior to the formation of the system, the position of president was more akin to what is now chancellor of the Columbia campus. However, the UM System counts presidents who served before the system was created, therefore the numbering starts at 14. See University of Missouri#Presidents and chancellors for a list of presidents from 1841 to 1963 and chancellors from 1963–present.

Since 2017, the current president of the University of Missouri System is Mun Choi.

== History ==
The University of Missouri was founded in 1839 in Columbia. It was the first public institution of higher learning west of the Mississippi River. It became a land-grant university after passage of the Morrill Act of 1862. In 1870, the University established the Missouri School of Mines and Metallurgy in Rolla.

The UM System was created in 1963 when the University of Kansas City, which had been a private institution, was acquired and renamed University of Missouri-Kansas City. That same year, a new university named University of Missouri-St. Louis was created. In 1964, the School of Mines ‡ was renamed the University of Missouri-Rolla, and the original university in Columbia was renamed University of Missouri-Columbia. Effective January 1, 2008, UM–Rolla became the Missouri University of Science and Technology.

=== Naming ===
Since its founding in 1839 until the formation of the system in 1963, the institution in Columbia was known simply as the University of Missouri. When the University of Missouri System was established, the existing institutions—the University of Missouri in Columbia and its offshoot, the Missouri School of Mines and Metallurgy in Rolla were renamed the University of Missouri–Columbia and the University of Missouri–Rolla. The formerly private institution acquired by the system, the University of Kansas City, was renamed the University of Missouri–Kansas City. The newly created institution in St. Louis was suitably named the University of Missouri–St. Louis, thus creating a uniformly named system of institutions.

The original generic name, the University of Missouri, was not officially assigned to any of the schools or the system. However, it has been commonly used both formally and informally to mean the original Columbia campus or the system. It has also been used to mean any of the other three campuses, though this is most often done in a casual manner at the campus in question, or by persons unfamiliar with the system. All four campuses have felt their regional designations potentially cause them to be mistaken as second-tier regional institutions. Considerable controversy over use of the generic name has been caused by the Columbia campus claiming de facto ownership, further marginalizing the other three campuses.

The Rolla campus was first to enact a break from regional designation. On 6 April 2007, the board of curators approved a proposal to rename the school the Missouri University of Science and Technology, effective 1 January 2008. In addition to ridding itself of a regional designation, it also emphasizes the school's technological research mission. This quickly catalyzed a long-dormant "name restoration" campaign at the Columbia campus to drop its regional designation. This proposal met with considerable criticism, mainly from the Kansas City and St. Louis campuses, who saw this as unnecessary or unfair and an intentional detriment to their campuses. On 29 November 2007, the board of curators voted unanimously to allow the Columbia campus to use the generic University of Missouri name for essentially all public purposes, but not when dealing with "official business" such as budget documents, legal contracts, and other internal UM System documentation, or whenever clarification from the system or other campuses is needed. Use of the generic name is not compulsory and the Columbia designation may continue to be used in any context. The decision also stipulates that the UM System utilize the "System" designation in most instances. Proponents of the change say that it simply provides clarification and recognizes what has always been common usage, but the issue remains controversial.

Southwest Missouri State University sought and eventually was granted permission to drop its regional designation and become Missouri State University. This change was initially vehemently opposed by the UM System, as it saw this as a threat to its funding and its stature as the premier public institution of higher learning in Missouri. It also would create historic entanglements, as the University of Missouri had interchangeably used the Missouri State University name at times in its history. This resulted from MU being designated as both a land grant and a research institution, unlike states such as Iowa where separate institutions (University of Iowa and Iowa State University) were created.

=== Proposed merger ===
In April 2003, Northwest Missouri State University in Maryville approached the UM System with the possibility of becoming the fifth school in the system. Name proposals for the university after the merger, such as the University of Missouri–Northwest, were to reflect the school's separate heritage. The Maryville institution would have become a doctoral degree-granting research university of equal stature with the existing UM System universities. However, the enabling legislation before the Missouri General Assembly never passed and the deal sunset. There have been no further attempts at a merger.

=== 2015 racial controversies, protests, and resignations ===
In 2015, Wolfe was the subject of criticism from a variety of groups over his failure to address a series of racist incidents at the University of Missouri, including students openly using racial slurs towards minority student leaders, and an October incident where feces was used to draw a swastika, drawing condemnation from black and Jewish student organizations. In November 2015, Missouri's Legion of Black Collegians announced that approximately thirty athletes would not participate in any team activities unless Wolfe resigned. On November 8, 2015, the Missouri Student Association joined in calling for Wolfe's resignation.

On November 9, 2015, Wolfe resigned at a special Board of Curators meeting that morning. In a statement, he said, "My motivation in making this decision comes from a love of Columbia where I grew up and the state of Missouri. I thought and prayed over this decision. It is the right thing to do. ... The frustration and anger I see is real and I don't doubt it for a second. ... I take full responsibility for the actions that have occurred. I have asked everybody to use my resignation to heal. Let's focus in changing what we can change today and in the future, not what we can't change in the past."
