= List of charter members of the NCAA =

The forerunner of the NCAA, the IAAUS, was founded in 1905. At that time, the following 39 schools joined.

- Allegheny College
- Amherst College
- Bucknell University
- Colgate University
- University of Colorado (Note: Since 1965, when the original university became a multi-campus system with the opening of the University of Colorado Colorado Springs, this school has legally been the University of Colorado Boulder.)
- Dartmouth College
- Denison University
- Dickinson College
- Franklin & Marshall College
- George Washington University
- Grove City College
- Haverford College
- Lehigh University
- Miami University (Ohio)
- University of Minnesota
- University of Missouri (Note: Legally the University of Missouri–Columbia since the creation of the University of Missouri System in 1963; however, the university only uses its geographic identifier on official documents within the UM System.)
- University of Nebraska (Note: Since 1968, when the original university became a multi-campus system with its absorption of what is now the University of Nebraska Omaha, this school has legally been the University of Nebraska–Lincoln.)
- New York University
- Niagara University
- University of North Carolina (Note: Since 1963, when the Woman's College of the University of North Carolina became the University of North Carolina at Greensboro, this school's formal name has been University of North Carolina at Chapel Hill. The term "University of North Carolina" has referred to the state's entire public university system since 1972.)
- Oberlin College
- Ohio Wesleyan University
- University of Pennsylvania
- University of Rochester
- Rutgers College
- Seton Hall College
- Swarthmore College
- Syracuse University
- Tufts University
- Union College
- United States Military Academy
- Vanderbilt University
- Washington & Jefferson College
- Wesleyan University
- Western University (Pennsylvania)
- Westminster College (Pennsylvania)
- Williams College
- Wittenberg University
- College of Wooster
