= University of Missouri Police Department =

- Patch of the University of Missouri Police Department.
- Common name: MU Police
- Abbreviation: MUPD

Agency overview
- Formed: 1954 (Traffic Safety and Security Department); 1971 (University Police Department)
- Employees: 49 sworn officers 21 civilian employees

Jurisdictional structure
- Operations jurisdiction: Missouri, USA
- Population: Columbia, Missouri population of 120,612 (2016) in addition to nearly 30,000 students during academic year
- Legal jurisdiction: University of Missouri property (primary); Boone County (secondary)
- General nature: Civilian police

Operational structure
- Headquarters: 901 Virginia Avenue Columbia, Missouri 65201
- Agency executive: Brian Weimer, Chief of Police

Website
- Official website

The University of Missouri Police Department (MUPD) is the primary law enforcement agency for the University of Missouri (Mizzou), a public research university located in Columbia, Missouri and the flagship campus of the University of Missouri System.

The agency's primary jurisdiction is the University of Missouri owned locations, which includes the main campus plus other MU-owned or leased facilities, such as Mizzou North (the former Ellis Fischel Cancer Center) on Business Loop 70, KOMU-TV on U.S. Route 63, and various MU-operated land and facilities scattered throughout Columbia and the State of Missouri.

MU Police Officers have statewide jurisdiction, and also are commissioned through the City of Columbia. MU Police Officers have the ability to make an arrest anywhere within the State of Missouri as well as enforce city ordinances in Columbia, MO.

== History ==
The agency was established as the "Traffic Safety and Security Department" in 1954. It became a 24-hour agency in 1964 and began sending officers to the Missouri State Highway Patrol's Basic Police Academy during the Vietnam War. It became the University of Missouri Police Department in September 1971.

The agency has been accredited by the Commission on Accreditation for Law Enforcement Agencies since 2001.

Reports from the MU Police Department, along with the Columbia Police Department, were featured as part of two 2014 ESPN Outside the Lines investigations that focused on errors in how the university handled sexual assault cases.

The MU Police Department was also at the center of media attention during the 2015-16 University of Missouri protests, which resulted in the resignations of the president of the University of Missouri System and the chancellor of the flagship Columbia campus.

In 2015, former Major Doug Schwandt was promoted to Chief of Police for the University of Missouri System. In 2020, Schwandt retired as Chief, and Major Brian Weimer was promoted as Interim Chief. As of February 2021, the university is still conducting its search process for a new Chief of Police.

== Organization ==
=== Department units ===
MUPD operates the following department units:

- Patrol Division
- Investigations
- Emergency Management
- Accreditation
- Purchasing
- Communications
- Records
- Security Services
- Campus Safety Officers
- Property (Evidence/Lost & Found)
- Crime Prevention
- Clery Reporting

=== Commissioned/sworn positions ===
MUPD uses the following ranks:

Title	Insignia
Chief of Police	
Major	
Lieutenant	
Sergeant	
Police Officer	

== Equipment ==
The department's vehicle fleet consists of Ford vehicles, mainly the Utility (based on the Ford Explorer). MUPD also has several unmarked, undercover vehicles. MUPD also uses Police bicycles and utility vehicles to patrol the internal workings of the main campus as well as downtown Columbia.

The standard issue sidearm is the Smith & Wesson M&P.

== See also ==
- Boone County Sheriff's Department
- Columbia Police Department
