= Columbia Police Department (Missouri) =

Police department in Columbia, Missouri

- Abbreviation: CPD

Agency overview
- Employees: 239
- Annual budget: $29,800,000

Jurisdictional structure
- Area: 67.45 sq mi (174.70 km²)
- Population: 126,853 (2021)
- Legal jurisdiction: City of Columbia, Missouri

Operational structure
- Headquarters: 600 East Walnut; Columbia, Missouri
- Officers: 187
- Agency executive: Jill Schlude, Chief of Police

The Columbia Police Department (CPD) is the principal law enforcement agency serving the city of Columbia, Missouri, in the United States. It has 187 sworn police officers.

== Bureaus ==
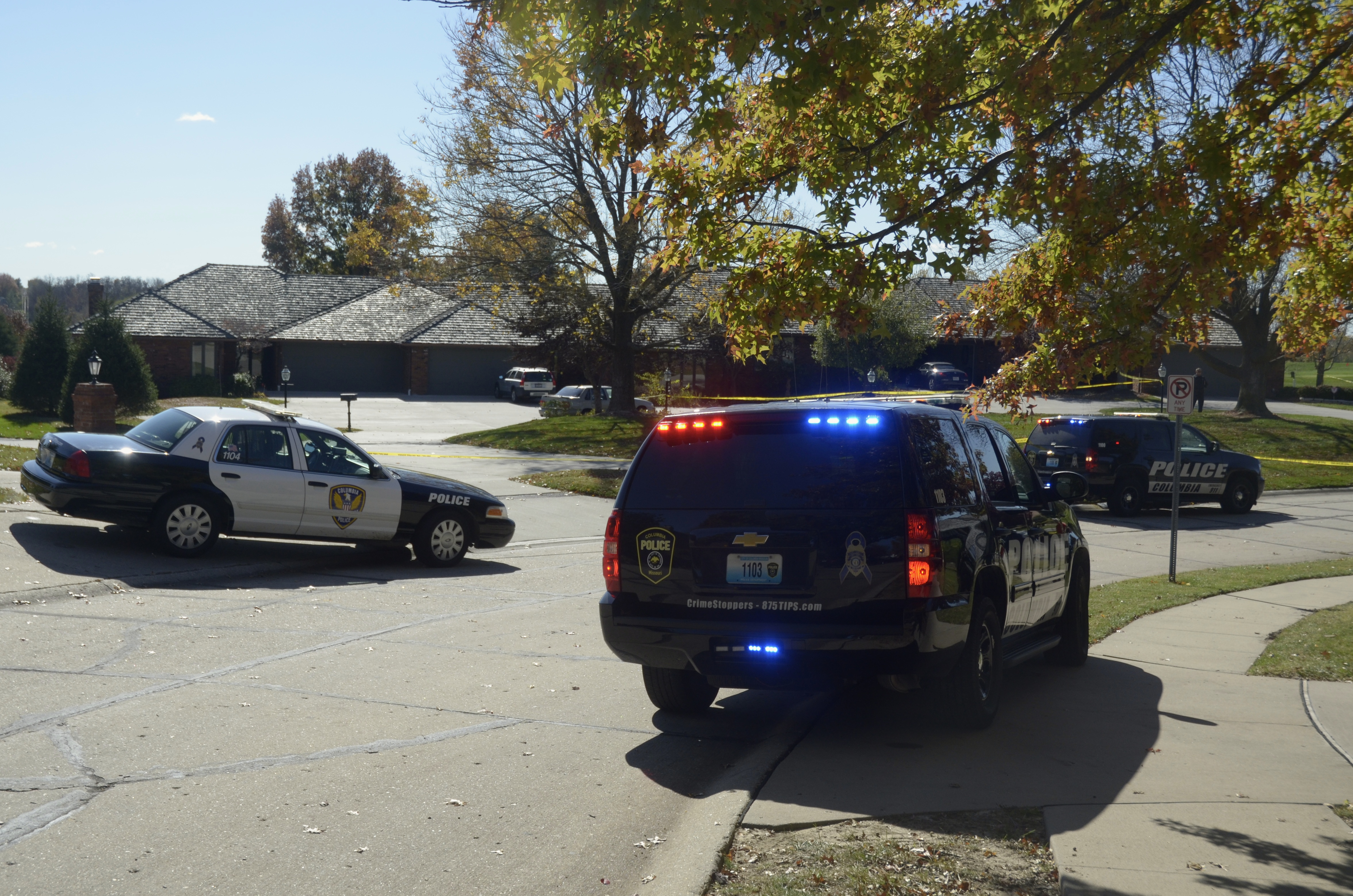
Investigating a crime scene

The Columbia Police Department is made up of four bureaus: the Administrative Bureau, the Chief of Police and the Administrative Support, Operations Bureaus and Operations Support Bureaus.

=== Administrative Bureaus ===
The Administrative Bureau is the smallest of the four bureaus and contains the Office of the Chief of Police, Deputy Chief of Police, the Armory, Public Relations Unit, Accreditation Manager, Neighborhood Services Officer, the Budget and Financial Management Specialist, and the Legal Advisor. The Deputy Chief is responsible for the three bureau commanders.

=== Administrative Support Bureau ===
The Administrative Support Bureau includes the Internal Affairs Unit, Training and Recruitment Unit and Records Unit, as well as the building and vehicle (fleet) maintenance personnel. The Internal Affairs Unit consists of a sergeant and an officer; it became operational in February 2008. The SWAT and Crisis Negotiation Team (CNT) is under this bureau as well.

The Training and Recruitment Unit, in conjunction with the Columbia City Human Resources Department, is responsible for all new hires to the CPD. The unit also supervises the Field Training program, a program for recruiting officer training. The TRU is headquartered at the Columbia Police Regional Training Center, located just south of the city along US Highway 63.

The Records Unit is made up of civilian staff who are responsible for filling police reports with local courts. This unit is responsible for filing Uniform Crime Reports (UCR) data to the Federal Bureau of Investigation each year.

=== Operations Bureau ===
The Operations Bureau is composed of the Patrol Division, Downtown Unit, K-9 Unit and the Community Service Aides. Uniformed officers in this division enforce state statutes, local ordinances and traffic laws, as well as many other activities. Community Service Aides (CSAs) are non-sworn civilian personnel who respond to minor accidents and conduct traffic control.

The City of Columbia is divided into three sectors (north, central and south) and is patrolled by approximately 70 officers assigned to four shifts. The Patrol Division is commanded by a captain, who is assisted by three Patrol Lieutenants who serve as shift commanders. Each of the four shifts is under the direct supervision of sergeants. Two canine teams are also assigned to the Patrol Division. The Downtown Unit is staffed by five officers and led by a sergeant.

=== Operations Support Bureau ===
The Operations Support Bureau is made up of the Criminal Investigations Division, Vice Narcotics & Organized Crime Unit, Traffic Unit and the Evidence Unit. The Evidence Unit is composed of civilian personnel supervised by a CPD Sergeant. The Vice Narcotics & Organized Crime Unit is composed of the uniformed detectives and personnel of the Street Crimes Unit. It is assigned to investigate activity involving the illegal selling, buying and possession of dangerous drugs and narcotics. The Street Crimes Unit, formed in 2008, is composed of four officers supervised by a sergeant.

The Criminal Investigation Division (CID) is led by two sergeants and headed by a lieutenant and has detectives who are assigned to investigate crimes along with major felony property crimes. In addition, CID has two specialized units that conduct investigations involving juveniles and domestic violence (DOVE). The CID is also responsible for investigating fires within the city of Columbia and oversees the department's Forensic Evidence Team. The Forensic Evidence Team is made up of volunteer members who receive specialized training in evidence collection.

==== DOVE Unit ====
The Domestic Violence Enforcement Unit (DOVE) began operating at the Columbia Police Department on February 2, 1998. The DOVE Unit was funded through the Stop Violence Against Women grant, and it has units composed of three investigators, a victim advocate, and two assistant prosecuting attorneys. The DOVE Unit investigates domestic violence incidents in Columbia and Boone County.

==== Traffic Unit ====
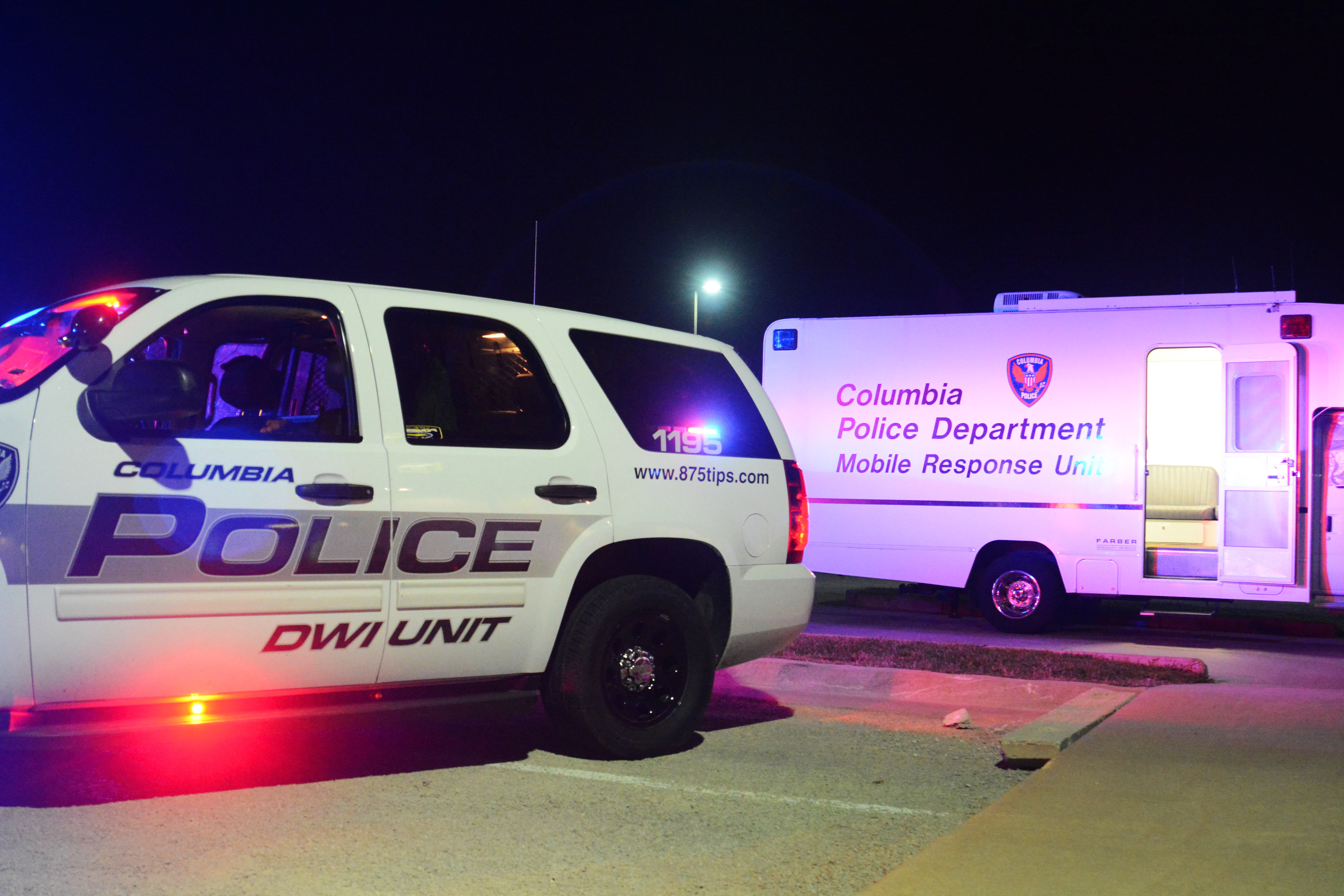
DWI unit and mobile response unit

The Traffic Unit is composed of accident investigators, motorcycle officers and the DWI Enforcement Unit. The DWI Unit consists of two officers. The units' two Chevrolet Tahoes are each equipped with Alco-Sensor IV breath test instruments.

== Special teams ==
=== SWAT ===
Formerly known as the Special Tactics and Response Team (STAR), the Columbia SWAT Team was created in 1976 after a need was determined for a specialized team trained in tactics beyond ordinary police response. The SWAT Team is divided into three sub-units: Arrest Team, Rescue Team and Sniper Team.

=== Neighborhood Response Team ===
The Neighborhood Response Team (N.R.T.) was created in 1999. These concerns of residents in the area include illegal drug activity, trash, abandoned vehicles and dilapidated housing. The N.R.T. is tasked with following up on citations for conditions that are observed to not be up to city code (roof deterioration, peeling paint, debris on property, etc.).

Members of the N.R.T. include the following city agencies: the Environmental Health division of the Health Department, the Protective Inspection division of the Public Works Department, the Police Department and the Department of Public Communications.

=== Crisis Negotiation Team ===
Created in 1976, the Crisis Negotiation Team, originally called the Hostage Negotiation Team, is tasked with responding to hostage or emotionally distressed subject events. In 1998, the H.N.T. changed their name to Crisis Negotiation Team. Once a negotiation is underway, one team handles the communication, the second team provides intelligence and the third supports them both.

== In the news ==
On July 7, 2009, the Columbia City Council voted to create a Police Review Board. The nine-member board was chosen by the city council.

In January 2019, Officer Andria Hesse struck and killed a child while driving on a sidewalk near an elementary school. First charged with involuntary manslaughter, she pleaded guilty to careless and imprudent driving. In July 2021, she was sentenced to two years of supervised probation.

== See also ==
- University of Missouri Police Department
- Boone County Sheriff's Department
