= University of Missouri Health Care =

American health system

University of Missouri Health System
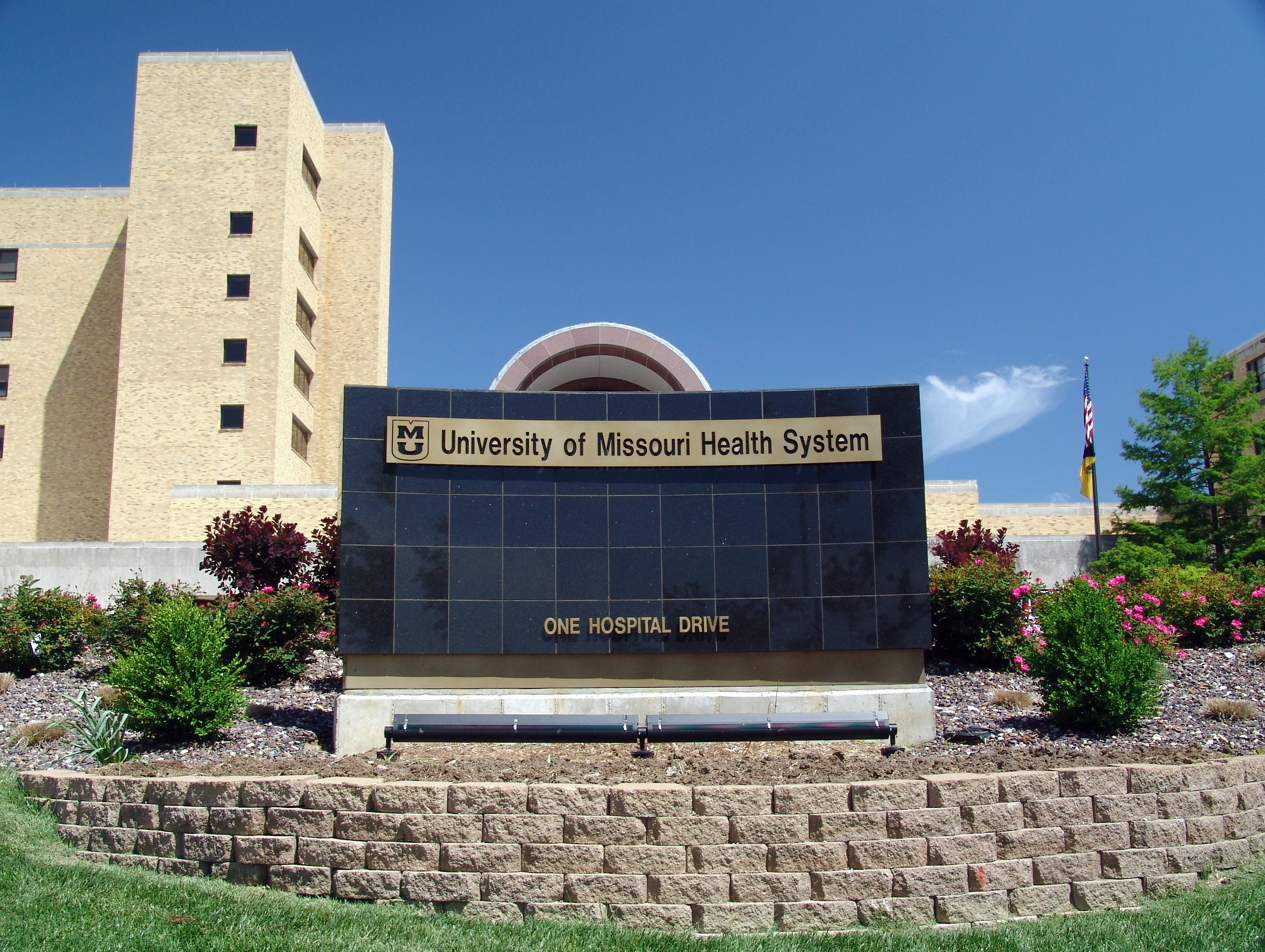
- Company Type: Healthcare Provider
- Hospitals: 5
- Annual Revenue: $1 Billion (estimated)
- Employees: 8328
- Key People: Jonathan Curtright (chief executive officer); Thomas Selva, (chief medical information officer); Bryan Bliven (chief information officer)
- Headquarters: Columbia, Missouri

University of Missouri Health Care is an American academic health system located in Columbia, Missouri, United States. It's owned by the University of Missouri System. University of Missouri Health System includes five hospitals: University Hospital, Ellis Fischel Cancer Center, Missouri Orthopedic Institute and University of Missouri Women's and Children's Hospital — all of which are located in Columbia. It's affiliated with Capital Region Medical Center in Jefferson City, Missouri. It also includes more than 60 primary and specialty-care clinics (including the Mizzou Quick Care Clinics) and the University Physicians medical group.

In May 2015, MU Health Care, Mercy Health System out of Springfield, Missouri, and Mosaic Life Care announced a joint partnership. The goal between the three systems will be to provide clinics and possibly other hospitals in rural areas of Missouri and surrounding states.

Academic partners include the University of Missouri's School of Health Professions, School of Medicine and Sinclair School of Nursing. It is also affiliated with the Rusk Institute of Rehabilitation Medicine (which is a joint venture with HealthSouth and MU Health Care) as well as Capital Region Medical Center in Jefferson City and Cooper County Memorial Hospital in Boonville.

== University Hospital ==
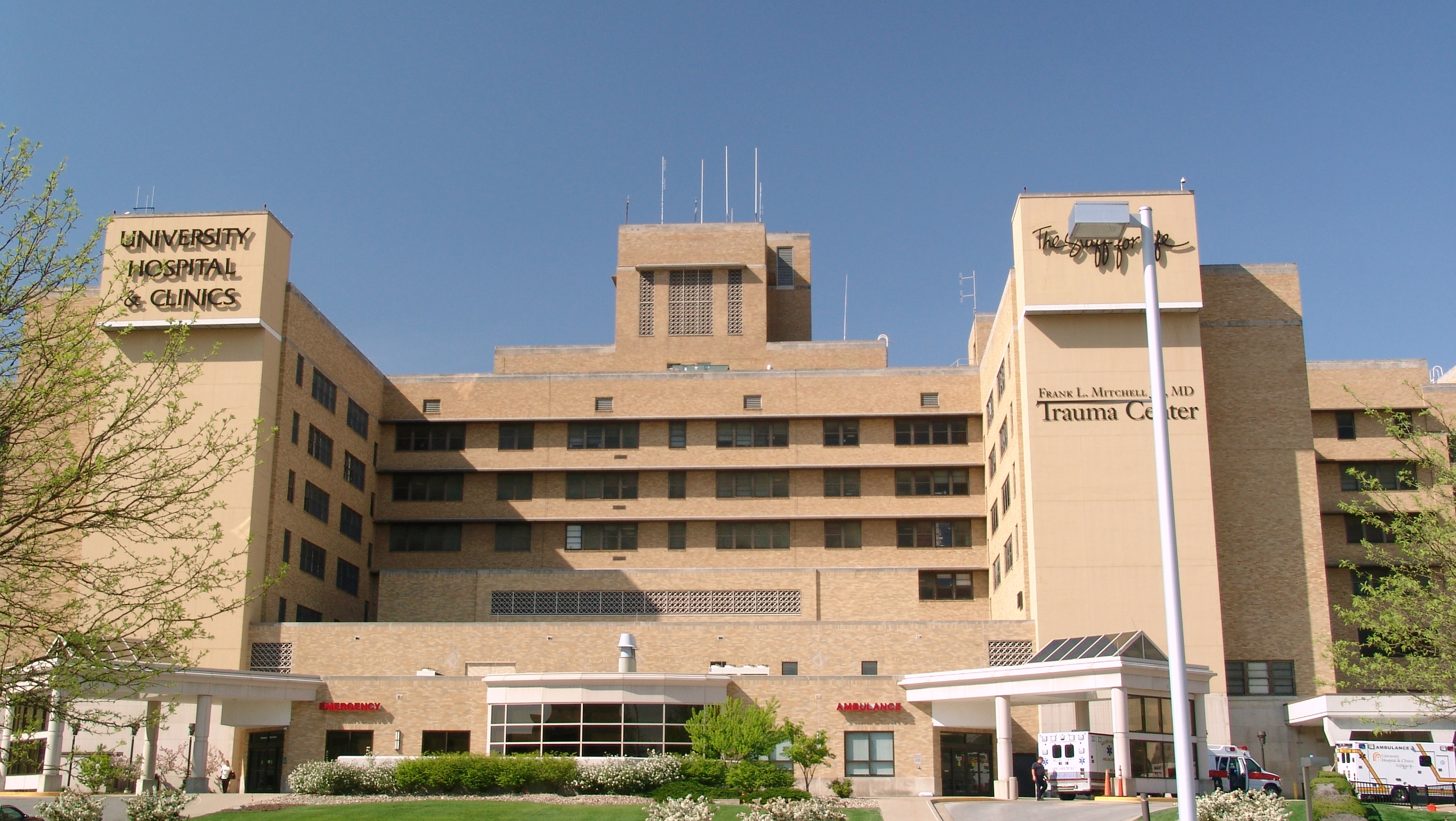
University Hospital

The flagship hospital of MU Health Care, University Hospital, is a 247-bed facility located in Columbia, Missouri. The hospital's physicians and staff cared for 19,096 hospital patients Fiscal Year 2009. The Frank L. Mitchell Jr., MD Trauma Center located within the hospital is the only American College of Surgeons (ACS) certified Level I trauma center in Mid-Missouri and one of three in the state. University Hospital is a nationally accredited Cycle II Chest Pain Center and a nationally accredited Primary Stroke Center. It has a seven-story ICU tower comprising surgical, medical-neurological and cardiac intensive care units, as well as the George D. Peak Memorial Burn and Wound Center, the only burn ICU in Mid-Missouri. University Hospital also contains the region's only cochlear implant center, a diabetes center, an ophthalmology institute (the Mason Eye Institute), a sleep disorders center, an endoscopy center, endo-suites dedicated to minimally invasive surgery and a SameDay Surgery Center that offers hundreds of different procedures in its fully equipped operating rooms.

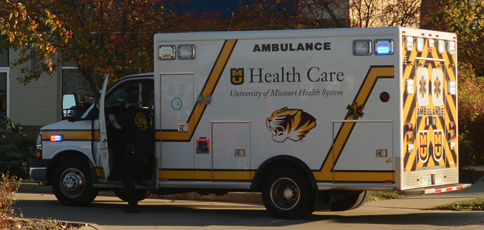
A University of Missouri Health Care ambulance in 2015

A seven-story patient care tower was completed in 2013 and is the new home of Ellis Fischel Cancer Center, as well as 12 additional operating rooms, 51 pre-and post-operation recovery rooms, and 90 private patient rooms.

University of Missouri Health Care also operates an ambulance service from bases strategically located around Boone County. The ambulance service is the exclusive provider for all concerts and other events in Mizzou Sports Park, including all MU football games at Faurot Field. Together, with Boone Hospital ambulances, they provide 24-hour coverage to Columbia, Ashland, Centralia, Hallsville and the other towns in Boone County. University of Missouri Health Care also has a supreme security department, known to many as UMC Security. Available 24/7 for all locations, UMC Security is considered a law enforcement agency for most other agencies in the surrounding areas. UMC Security Officers respond to approximately 40,000 calls annually. Additionally, MU Air Medical Services helicopter service, a partnership between Air Evac Lifeteam and University of Missouri Health, operates helicopters based in Moberly, MO, Osage Beach, MO, Sedalia, MO and Kirksville, MO. They utilize Bell 407 and EC 135 Aircraft offering services throughout Missouri, Southeastern Iowa, and Western Illinois.

== University of Missouri Women's and Children's Hospital ==
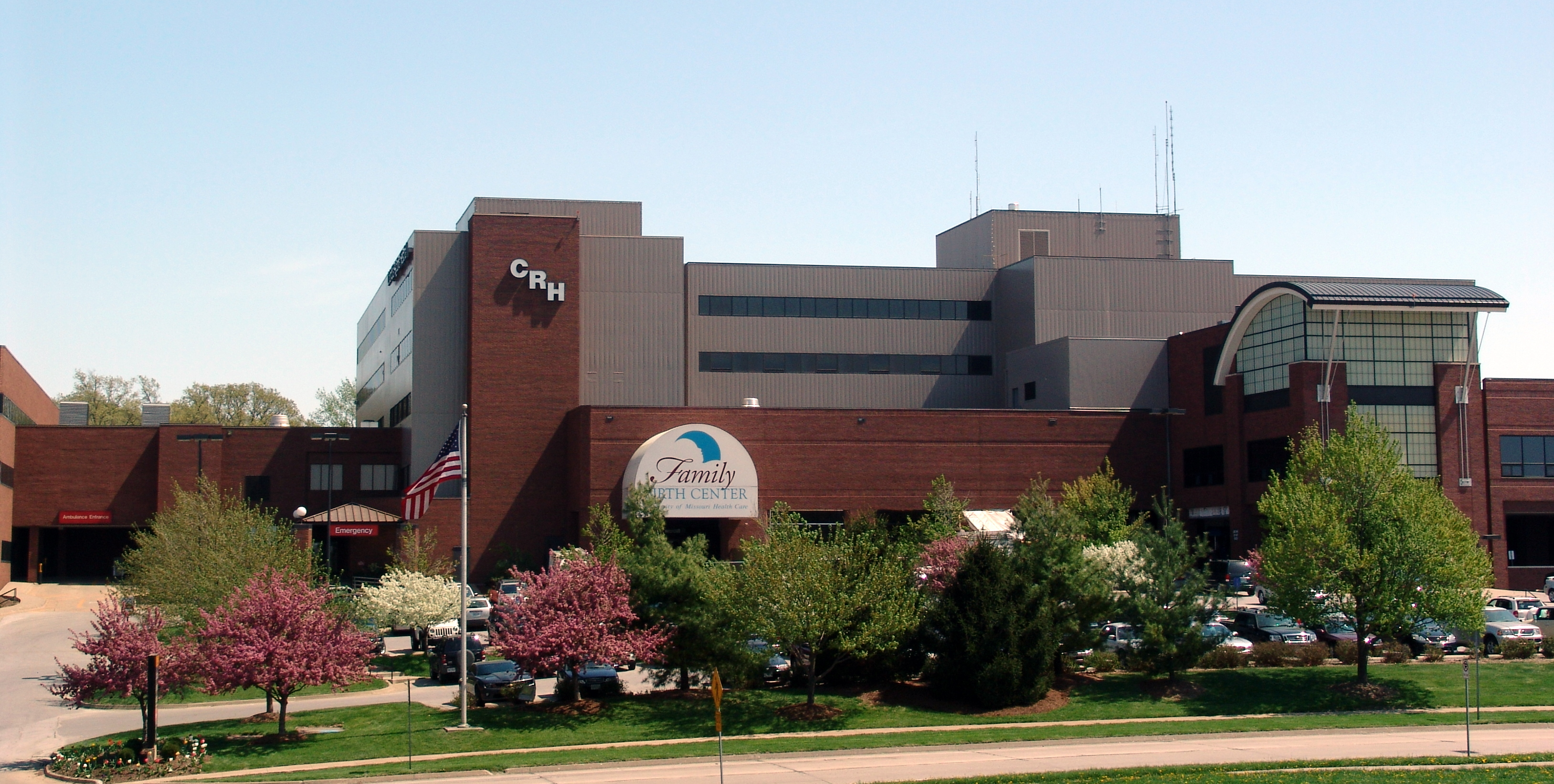
MU Women's and Children's Hospital

University of Missouri Women's and Children's Hospital is Missouri's only hospital dedicated to both women and children. It is located in the former Columbia Regional Hospital building at 404 Keene Street in Columbia. The hospital is home to MU Children's Hospital, MU Women's Center, and the Family Birth Center. In Fiscal Year 2009, a total of 1,793 babies were born in the Family Birth Center. The hospital offers the da Vinci minimally invasive surgical robotic system.

MU Children's Hospital is the largest pediatric health care facility in mid-Missouri. More than 100 physicians provide care in more than 30 pediatric specialties including cardiology, cancer and surgical specialties, radiology, a pediatric sleep lab, and plastic and reconstructive surgery. It includes the highest level Neonatal Intensive Care Unit (Level III), sophisticated Pediatric Intensive Care Unit (PICU), an adolescent unit, a short-stay center, a general pediatrics unit, an adolescent game room, a pediatric play room, a patient playground and a school for children who are in the hospital for a long period of time. In 2009, more than 4,000 patients were admitted to Children's Hospital. Clinic visits numbered nearly 42,500.

Women's and Children's Hospital has 60,000 square feet (5,600 m^{2}) dedicated to children. There are 43 private inpatient rooms for pediatric and adolescent patients decorated in bright, kid-friendly décor, averaging 244 square feet (22.7 m^{2}), and including a bathroom and sleeper sofa for family members. The rooms come equipped with free wireless Internet access, Blu-ray DVD systems, and a Wii Gaming System. Additionally, there are 13 private patient rooms in the new pediatric intensive care unit (PICU) and expanded pediatric and adolescent playrooms featuring age-specific games, toys, and activities.

The Children's Hospital Transport Service is the only service of its kind outside of St. Louis and Kansas City. The service cares for children of all ages from premature infants to adolescents. The 26-member Children's Hospital transport team is composed of registered nurses, respiratory therapists, neonatologists and pediatric intensivists who are available 24 hours a day, seven days a week. Also, the neonatal ambulance team, consisting of an emergency medical technician, respiratory therapist and registered nurse, responds to any hospital request in Missouri.

== Ellis Fischel Cancer Center ==
Ellis Fischel Cancer Center is Missouri's only hospital dedicated solely to cancer care and was the first free-standing cancer center west of the Mississippi River and the second such institution of its kind in the United States. The former Ellis Fischel Cancer Center is located on Business Loop 70 West.

Construction on a new Ellis Fischel Cancer Center was completed in mid 2013, and the center is now located adjacent to the University Hospital. The center has seven floors which house Surgical Services, Progressive Care, Neurosciences Intensive Care, Orthopedics, and Outpatient Services, in addition to Oncology.

The Ernest and Eugenia Wyatt Guest House is located next to the old Ellis Fischel Cancer Center and is available for patients experiencing long-term outpatient care, such as chemotherapy, and families of Ellis Fischel inpatients.

== Missouri Orthopaedic Institute ==
The University of Missouri Health Care’s department of orthopedic surgery, headquartered at the Missouri Orthopaedic Institute, is the largest and most comprehensive orthopedic program in the region, featuring 50 faculty and performing more than 10,000 surgeries and 100,000 clinic visits annually. The institute is a national leader in advanced surgical care, robotics and regenerative orthopedics, supported by the 12,000-square-foot Thompson Laboratory for Regenerative Orthopaedics, which drives translational research with over 130 ongoing studies, 40 patents and more than 120 annual publications. The Missouri Osteochondral Preservation System has done significant work in allograft preservation and earned the American Orthopaedic Society for Sports Medicine “Sports Medicine Technology Award”, while its joint and limb preservation and targeted muscle reinnervation programs exemplify cutting-edge care. The department recently received $40 million in Advanced Research Projects Agency for Health funding for NOVAJoint, a living, tissue-engineered knee replacement project. Recognized by U.S. News & World Report as “high performing” in back surgery and as a DNV orthopedic and spine center of excellence, MU Orthopaedics also serves as team physicians for Mizzou Athletics. MU Health Care receives $4.3 million in active research funding, has standardized quality initiatives, and has conducted pioneering work in biologics and joint restoration.

== Missouri Psychiatric Center ==
Missouri Psychiatric Center, formerly known as Mid-Missouri Mental Health Center, offers short-term inpatient and outpatient treatment services for adults, adolescents and children with 57 inpatient beds. A 13-bed unit serves children and adolescents, while the remaining 44 beds are divided into two adult units. MUPC also offers an emergency room assessment unit to help with crisis stabilization and intake and discharge planning for patients. Psychiatrists also provide outpatient psychiatry care at MU Health Care's South Providence Medical Building, which opened in January 2015.

== Missouri Rehabilitation Center ==
Missouri Rehabilitation Center (MRC) was a 79-bed acute care hospital in Mount Vernon, Missouri, which closed in October 2014. Missouri Rehabilitation Center had the largest traumatic brain injury program within the state of Missouri, as well as nationally noted programs for stroke rehabilitation, ventilator weaning and spinal cord and orthopedic rehabilitation. Originally built as the Missouri State Sanatorium in 1907, MRC merged with University of Missouri Health Care in 1996.

Also on the MRC campus is a clinic operated as an extension of the VA Hospital in Fayetteville, Arkansas and the state's Tuberculosis Reference Laboratory run by the Missouri Department of Health.

== Clinics ==
University Physicians primary and specialty-care clinics are located in Columbia and surrounding communities in Mid-Missouri. In Fiscal Year 2009, the clinics had 519,597 patient visits.

== University Physicians ==
University Physicians is the largest physician medical group in Mid-Missouri. The group includes almost 500 physicians who are trained in approximately 70 specialties and sub-specialties. A great majority of the physicians also serve as faculty members of University of Missouri School of Medicine.

== Affiliated hospitals ==
=== Howard A. Rusk Rehabilitation ===
Rusk Rehabilitation Center is a 60-bed inpatient rehabilitation hospital that provides a higher level of rehabilitative care to patients who are recovering from stroke and other neurological disorders, brain and spinal cord injury, amputations, orthopedic, cardiac and pulmonary conditions. It is located on Business Loop-70 in Columbia.

=== Capital Region Medical Center ===
Capital Region Medical Center is a 100-bed facility offering a continuum of care in-house from prenatal and maternity services to home health services. It offers a 16-bed ER, one of the few accredited rehabilitation centers in the state, advanced cardiac and oncology services, as well as an extensive clinic system. It is located in Jefferson City, Missouri.

The Medical Center was formed when Still Regional Medical Center and Memorial Community Hospital merged in 1994. In 1997, Capital Region became affiliated with the University of Missouri Health Care.
