= University of Missouri School of Medicine =

Medical school of the University of Missouri

Coordinates: 38°56′19″N 92°19′41″W

- Other name: Mizzou Med
- Motto: Docere, Studere, bene facere (Latin)
- Motto in English: "To teach, to study, to do well"
- Type: Public medical school
- Established: 1872; 154 years ago
- Students: 416
- Location: Columbia, Missouri, United States
- Campus: Suburban
- Colors: Black and Gold
- Website: https://medicine.missouri.edu/
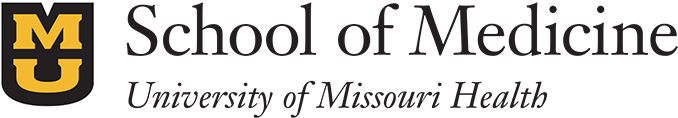

The University of Missouri School of Medicine (also called University of Missouri-Columbia School of Medicine or MU School of Medicine) is located in the southern part of the University of Missouri campus in Columbia, Missouri, United States. It was the first publicly supported medical school west of the Mississippi River.

== History ==
The University of Missouri School of Medicine is the medical school of the University of Missouri. Established in 1872, it was the first publicly supported medical school west of the Mississippi River. The school was organized as a two-year school in 1872. Joseph Norwood, M.D., professor of natural science and philosophy, was the first dean. The current dean is interim dean Steven Zweig who was previously the chair of Family and Community Medicine. The School of Medicine, along with the University of Missouri Sinclair School of Nursing and the University of Missouri School of Health Professions form the MU Health System.

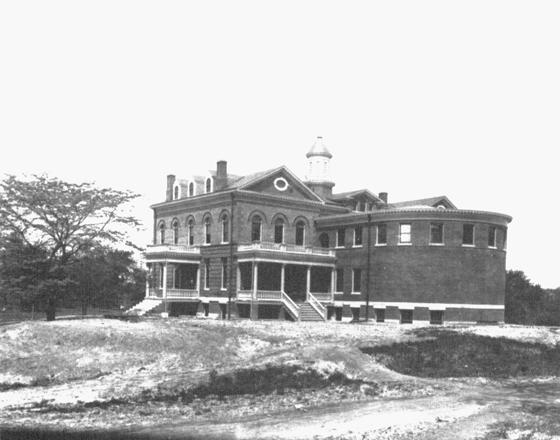
Parker Hospital around 1900

Progress was slow until 1890, when Richard Jesse was appointed university president. The school was housed in an old frame building on the northwest corner of campus. Equipment was inadequate and out of date, and the program was in danger of being discontinued. Jesse led the school to new heights due to nationwide advances in modernizing medical education. In addition, he reorganized the academic structure and raised financial support for new facilities. W.L. Parker established an endowment that supplemented the cost of building the Parker Memorial Hospital. In 1957, the school was transformed into a four-year program. As a result, the medical center was constructed in 1960. The name was later changed to University Hospitals and Clinics.

== Campus ==
The campus is located in the South portion of campus, along with the University Hospital, Mizzou Biojoint Center, and Ellis Fischel Cancer Center, among other members of the MU Health System. A new $42.5 million Patient-Centered Care Learning Center opened in Columbia in 2017.

A second campus, known as the Springfield Clinical Campus, was opened June 13, 2016, in partnership with CoxHealth and Mercy Health systems. In the past, eight to twelve MU medical students completed their last two years of training at the Springfield campus. Starting in the fall of 2027, the Springfield campus will operate as a full four-year regional medical school.

== Admissions ==
For the entering class in 2016, MU School of Medicine received 2,167 applications for 104 spots. 370 applicants were interviewed, and 164 were accepted. The average accepted applicant's GPA and MCAT percentile were 3.79 and 77.8, respectively.

The school employs 739 faculty members as part of 1,359 staff members. The schools has 401 medical students, 369 residents, 81 clinical fellows, 85 postdoctoral fellows, 139 PhD students, and 22 master's degree students. As of 2017, there are 7,700 physician alumni and 500 doctoral and master's degree alumni from the University of Missouri School of Medicine.

== Curriculum and rankings ==
Years one and two at the medical school are centered around patient based learning (PBL), in which students work through real clinical cases to strengthen their problem-solving capacity, clinical skills, and ability to collaborate with peers. In the third year, students participate in seven core clerkships (family medicine, internal medicine, neurology, obstetrics and gynecology, pediatrics, psychiatry, and surgery). In their fourth and final year, students are required to take advanced clinical electives, general electives, and an advanced biomedical science course.

The MU Department of Family Medicine has been ranked in Top 10 for 23 consecutive years, and the school itself is ranked No. 54 in its primary care training, out of 170 schools.

== Expansion ==
Beginning in August 2017, MU School of Medicine will expand its class size from 96 to 128 to help address the nationwide physician shortage. The class-size increase has been enabled by the opening of a second clinical campus in Springfield, Missouri, and the construction of a brand new Patient-Centered Care learning center on the main campus.

It is estimated that the expansion will provide an additional 300 Missouri physicians, create 3,500 new jobs, and add $390 million to the state economy annually.

== Reception ==
Several basic science departments are nationally recognized for excellent research. U.S. News & World Report has ranked MU's Department of Family and Community Medicine as one of the top three family medicine programs nationwide for 15 consecutive years. The 2008 rankings ranked MU third in family medicine (tied with University of Wisconsin–Madison) and 23rd among schools emphasizing primary care. In 2016, it was reported in The Columbia Missourian that "the number of MU School of Medicine students who have reported experiencing gender discrimination is twice as high as the national average."

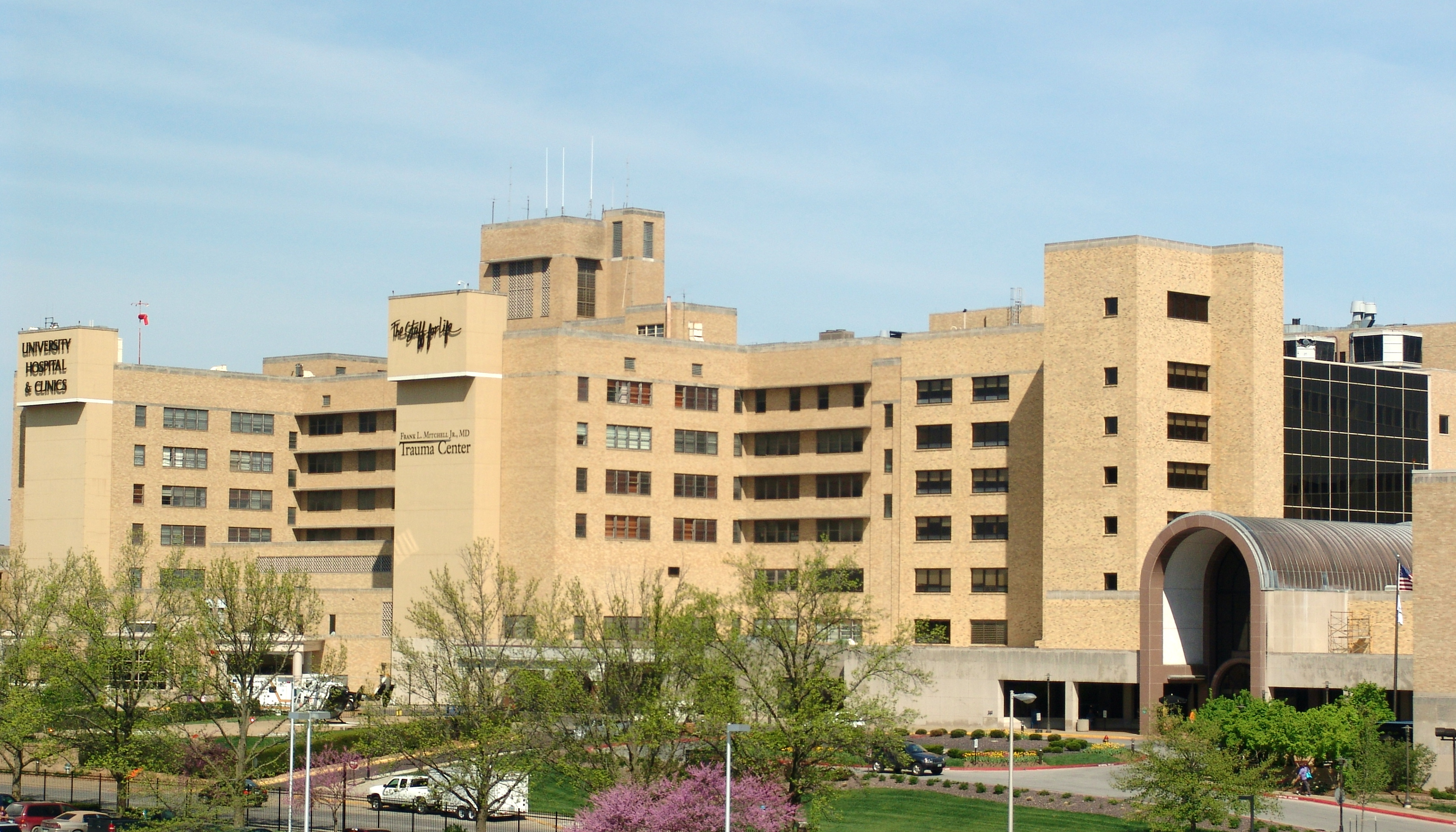
University Hospital

== MU Health Care Locations ==
- University of Missouri Hospital
- Ellis Fischel Cancer Center
- Women's and Children's Hospital
- Missouri Orthopaedic Institute
- Missouri Psychiatric Center
