= Sinclair School of Nursing =

Public college in Columbia, Missouri, US

- Established: 1920
- Parent institution: University of Missouri
- Affiliations: University of Missouri Health Care; Commission on Collegiate Nursing Education
- Dean: Lori Popejoy
- Faculty: 50+
- Students: 580
- Location: Columbia, Missouri, U.S. 38°56′23″N 92°19′40″W
- Website: nursing.missouri.edu

The Sinclair School of Nursing is a nursing school affiliated with the University of Missouri and University of Missouri Health Care. First established in 1920, the program is fully accredited by the Commission on Collegiate Nursing Education. In 2014, CollegeAtlas.org ranked it as the top school of nursing in the nation.

== Academics ==
The School has over 380 undergraduate students enrolled in the Bachelor of Science in Nursing (BSN) program and over 200 graduate students in their Master of Science in Nursing (MSN) and Doctor of Nursing Practice (DNP), and PhD programs.

The MU Sinclair School of Nursing maintains an eight-bed technology laboratory for students. Students may sign out equipment for use with clients as part of class assignments. The laboratory is staffed by skilled, experienced professional nurses who can offer suggestions for learning activities.

Institutions affiliated with the Sinclair School of Nursing include: Tiger Place, a retirement home that is a joint venture between the School of Nursing and Americare Senior Living; MU Sinclair Home Care, a home care arm of the School that was purchased in 2009 by Oxfard Healthcare; and the MU Interdisciplinary Center on Aging, which combines all three health science schools in an effort to enhance the quality of health care for older adults.
