= University of Missouri Hospital =

Hospital in Columbia, Missouri, U.S.

University Hospital
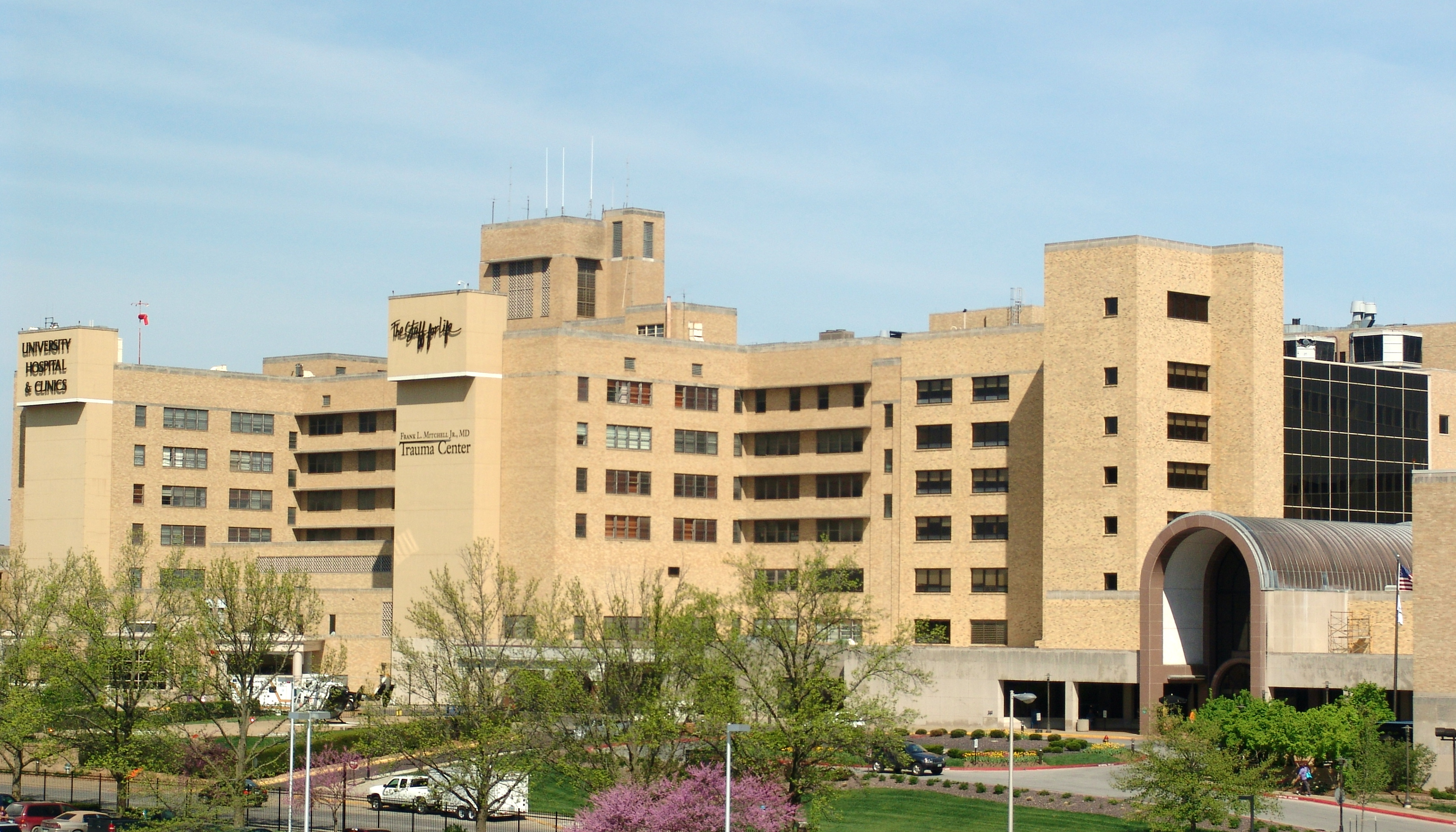

Geography
- Location: Columbia, Missouri, United States
- Coordinates: 38°56′18″N 92°19′40″W

Organization
- Care system: Tertiary
- Type: General Teaching Hospital
- Affiliated university: University of Missouri

Services
- Emergency department: Level I trauma center
- Beds: 390

Helipads
- Helipad: FAA LID: MU37

History
- Founded: September 16, 1956; 70 years ago

Links
- Lists: Hospitals in the United States

University Hospital is located in Columbia, Missouri, United States. It has the only Level I trauma center and helicopter service in Mid-Missouri, and the only burn intensive care unit in the region. It also has an accredited chest pain center cardiology program and a multidisciplinary digestive disease program. The hospital is affiliated with the University of Missouri and the University of Missouri School of Medicine.

== History ==
University Hospital is the third hospital owned and operated by the University of Missouri. Parker Memorial Hospital, built in 1901, was a 45-bed facility that served as the original clinical home for the University's medical and nursing programs. In 1906, it was decided that the hospital needed to be upgraded and a new 75-bed facility was opened in 1923, bringing the total bed number to 120. Both Parker Memorial Hospital and Noyes Hospital still serve the University Hospital as Parker and Noyes Halls, respectively.

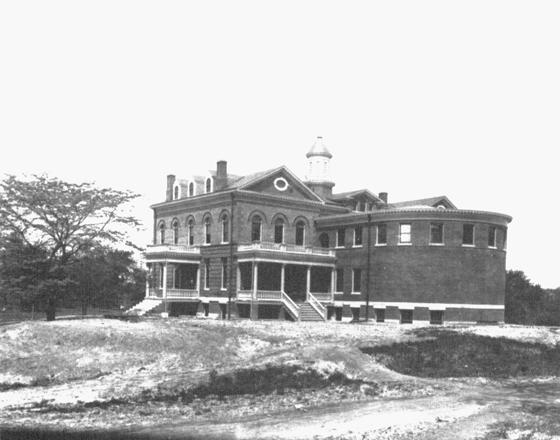
Parker Memorial Hospital, 1901.

After 10 years of political debate, it was decided that the University of Missouri needed a new hospital facility that would be located in Columbia. At least $13.5 million was appropriated for construction and the 7-floor structure was designed as a 441-bed, 28-bassinet, outpatient and emergency care facility, which was completed in 1956. The Medical Sciences Building and McHaney Hall, the nurse dormitory, were connected to the structure to make up the University of Missouri Hospital.

Constructed in the mid-1960s, the Harry S. Truman Veterans Administration Hospital, located south of the Medical Center, shares medical staff with the hospital. Also constructed in the mid-1960s was the Mid-Missouri Mental Health Center. Although it originally separate from the hospital, both this facility and the Medical Center shared many functions and helped to reduce costs due to duplication of effort. University Hospital now owns and operates the mental health center, now named the Missouri Psychiatric Center.

In 1976, the hospital and clinics were administratively separated from the UM Medical School control and became officially known as University Hospital and Clinics. In 1979, a new building was constructed for the School of Nursing.

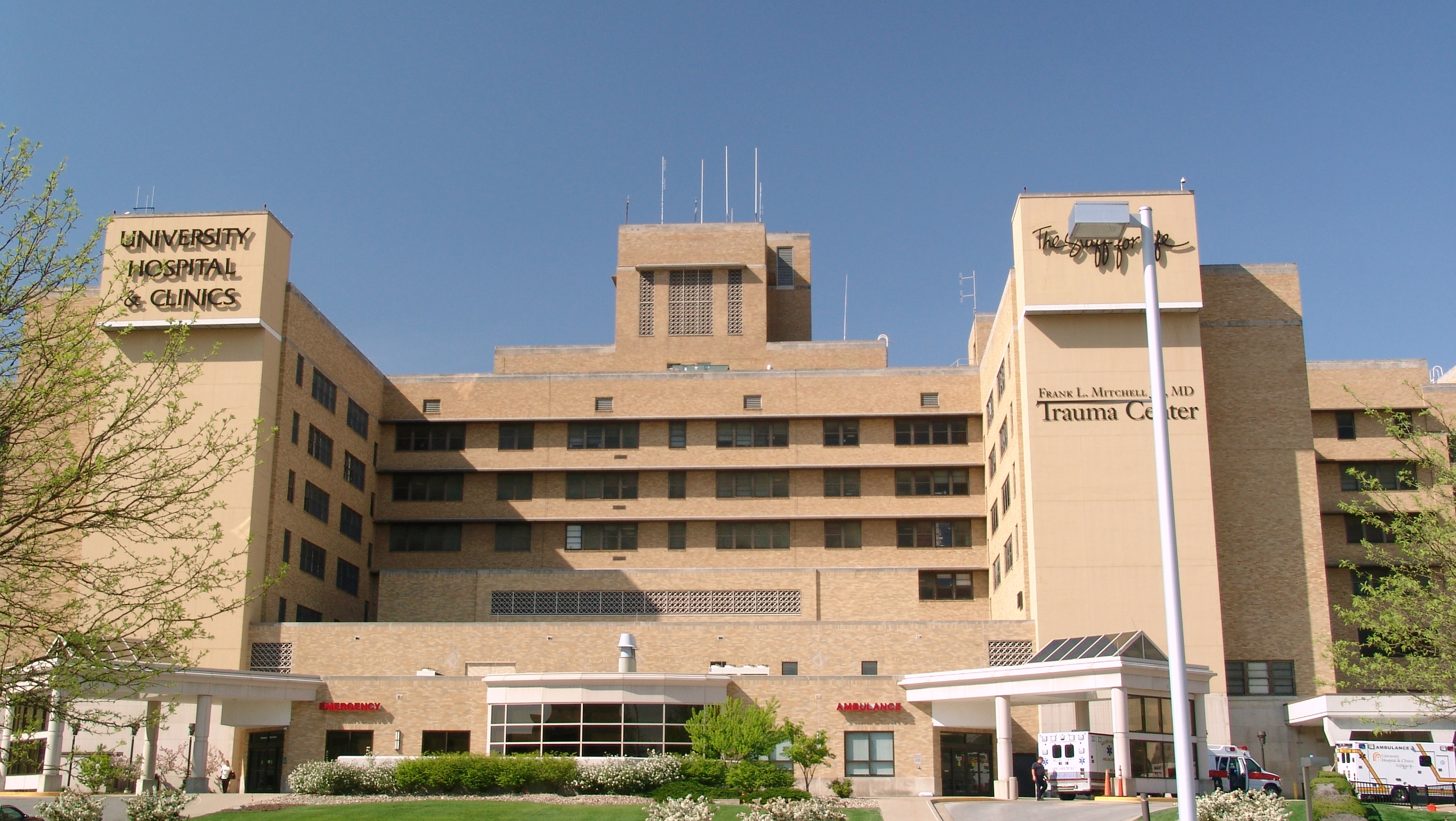
University Hospital and Clinics

The parent organization of University Hospital, University of Missouri Healthcare, struggled financially for several years and lost nearly $40 million between fiscal years 2000 and 2002. In 2001, hospital officials embarked on a plan to attack the deficit by laying off some employees, improving billing procedures and realigning some hospital services. In 2002, the university system hired a private medical management firm, The Hunter Group, which created a turnaround based on management and accountability practice changes. Hunter Management also recruited nearly 50 new faculty members.

In 2003, MU HealthCare reported more than $8 million in profits, and Hunter Management handed control back to MU in spring 2004. In fiscal years 2006 and 2007, the system continued its financial turnaround by posting combined earnings of $72.7 million.

In 2009, ground was broken for a new $203 million patient care tower to be located north of the hospital main entrance. The 8-story patient care tower was expected to house the Ellis Fischel State Cancer Center, room for up to 12 additional operating rooms and 51 pre-and post-operation recovery rooms, and 90 private patient rooms. The addition was completed in 2013 and is home to the oncology unit, orthopaedics unit, neurosciences intensive care unit, and the progressive care unit (formerly known as step-down unit).

== Trauma and emergency care ==
The Frank L. Mitchell Jr., M.D., Trauma Center at the University Hospital is designated a Level I trauma center by the state of Missouri and is one of only three Level I trauma centers in Missouri verified by the Committee on Trauma of the American College of Surgeons. Approximately 45,000 patients are seen each year in its emergency room.

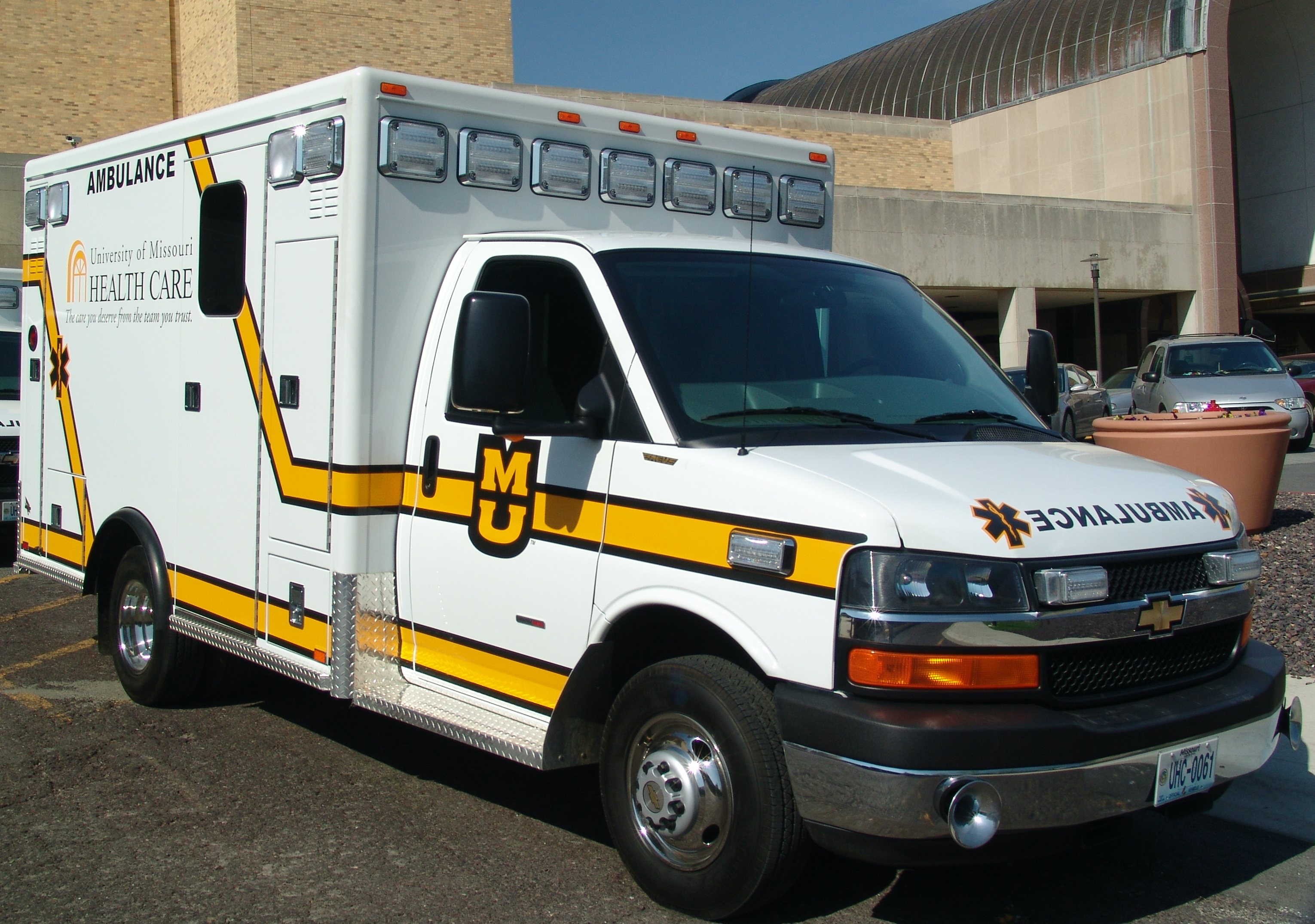
MU ambulance

=== Ambulance service ===
University of Missouri Health Care's ambulance service has provided advanced life support (ALS) pre-hospital care for the citizens of Columbia and Boone County since 1968. MU Health Care's ambulance services includes bases at University Hospital, Mizzou North, Woodrail Center and Women's and Children's Hospital, all in Columbia. An ambulance base also is located in Ashland, Missouri. University of Missouri Health Care's ambulance service serves as the exclusive provider at concerts and athletic events at Mizzou athletic facilities.

=== Security department ===
The University of Missouri Health Care security department is available 24/7 for all locations of University of Missouri Health Care. UMC Security Officers respond to approximately 40,000 assistance requests annually.

== Other specialty services ==
University Hospital contains the region's only cochlear implant center along with state-of-the-art otolaryngology clinics and comprehensive Ear, Nose, & Throat services; a diabetes center; an ophthalmology institute; a sleep disorders center; the only burn center in Mid-Missouri (The George David Peak Memorial Burn Care Center); and a SameDay Surgery Center that offers hundreds of different procedures in its fully equipped operating rooms.

== Educational affiliates ==
=== Sinclair School of Nursing ===
Even though the School of Nursing was not an established part of the University of Missouri School of Medicine until 1920, MU graduated its first class of nurses in 1904. Those first few graduated from Parker Memorial Hospital Training School for Nurses with a 3-year degree in nursing.

In 1973, the school became an autonomous division; additionally, construction on the School of Nursing building was begun in 1978, with the building being occupied in 1979. The School changed its name to the Sinclair School of Nursings after an endowment made by Charles and Josie Smith Sinclair in 1994.

Affiliated with the Sinclair School of Nursing are the Tiger Place, a retirement home that is a joint venture between the School of Nursing and Americare; MU Sinclair Home Care, a home care arm of the School that was purchased in 2009 by Oxfard Healthcare; and the MU Interdisciplinary Center on Aging, which combines all three health science schools in an effort to enhance the quality of health care for older adults.

==== MU School of Medicine ====
The University of Missouri School of Medicine was the first publicly supported medical school west of the Mississippi River. Created as the Medical School of the University of the State of Missouri in 1873, Parker Memorial Hospital was the clinical site for studies when it was built in 1901.

Today, the MU School of Medicine operates out of University Hospital and Clinics and is a primary provider of training for all physicians in Missouri. The School of Medicine's more than 650 faculty physicians and scientists educate approximately 1,000 medical students, residents, fellows and other students seeking advanced degrees. Prospective students compete for 104 first-year slots. The School uses a problem-based learning style, which emphasizes self-directed learning and early clinical experience.

==== MU College of Health Sciences ====
The MU College of Health Sciences (CHS) is the University of Missouri system's only school of health professions and the state's only public allied health program located on a health sciences campus. The school comprises nine departments and twenty-two disciplines.

== Notable advances ==
- 1958 – The first open-heart surgery in mid-Missouri performed at University Hospital
- 1962 – A giant coronary artery aneurysm successfully resected for the first time in the world
- 1966 – MU completes construction on its world-class Research Reactor Center, which focuses on nuclear medicine research, including medical diagnostic tools and radiopharmaceuticals
- 1968 – Foundation of first ambulance service in mid-Missouri, based out of University Hospital
- 1970 – Dr. John C Schuder develops the first automatic and completely implanted defibrillator for the human heart
- 1970s – Origin of the first paramedic program in the state by Frank L. Mitchell, Jr. MD
- 1972 – Gilbert Ross, MD, leads the first kidney transplant procedure in central Missouri
- 1977 – George Peak Memorial burn intensive care unit opened
- 1982 – Pediatric Cardiologist Dr. Zuhdi Lababidi performs the first pediatric angioplasty to correct aortic valve stenosis in newborns
- 1982 – Foundation of Staff for Life helicopter service
- 1996 – Dr. Zuhdi Lababidi performs his pediatric angioplasty procedure on a patient weighing 13 ounces, the smallest patient known to have undergone the procedure
- 2002 – MU's Randall Prather along with Immerge BioTherapeutics, clones the first miniature swine with a specific gene that causes human rejection “knocked out” of their DNA. The feat takes scientists a step closer to the possibility of pig-to-human organ transplantation

== Sources ==
- MU Health Care
- University Hospital's 50th Anniversary
- Goldstein, Max A. One Hundred Years of Medicine and Surgery in Missouri. St. Louis Star. 1900.
- Potter, Ruby Mildred. A Portrait of Success: Mizzou Nursing, 1901–1989. UMC. 1989.
