= Ellis Fischel Cancer Center =

Cancer center in Columbia, Missouri, U.S.

- University of Missouri Health Care

Geography
- Location: Columbia, Missouri, United States
- Coordinates: 38.9387°N 92.3270°W

Organization
- Care system: Oncology
- Type: Specialist
- Affiliated university: University of Missouri

Services
- Emergency department: None (Level I trauma center through University Hospital)
- Speciality: Cancer

Links
- Website: www.ellisfischel.org
- Lists: Hospitals in the United States

Ellis Fischel Cancer Center is a member of University of Missouri Health Care in Columbia, Missouri, United States. It was the first free-standing cancer center west of the Mississippi River and the second such institution of its kind in the United States. The center is now connected to University of Missouri Hospital at 1 Hospital Drive. The former Ellis Fischel Cancer Center was located on Business Loop 70 West.

== History ==
The beginnings of Ellis Fischel can be traced back to 1931 when the Missouri State Medical Association created a committee on cancer. Due to the lack of facilities, the first cancer hospital was a roving hospital that cared for cancer patients of all ages in hospitals across the state. A plan was conceived for a centrally located hospital in 1937. Dr. Ellis Fischel, a leading St. Louis Oncologist, envisioned a statewide plan for the control of cancer, which included a State Cancer Hospital, equipped with the latest facilities for treatment, staffed by specially trained physicians, with provision for scientific investigation into the causes of the disease, and satellite diagnostic tumor clinics established around the state. Missouri Governor Lloyd C. Stark, a major supporter of this plan, signed a bill to erect the hospital in 1937.

Columbia was chosen as the site of the hospital because of the central location and the presence of the University of Missouri, a major cancer research center. The seven-story, 104-bed hospital was built on U.S. Route 40 (now Interstate 70) in 1938. Ellis Fischel was expanded in 1975 to increase laboratory space, clinic capability and operating room suites.

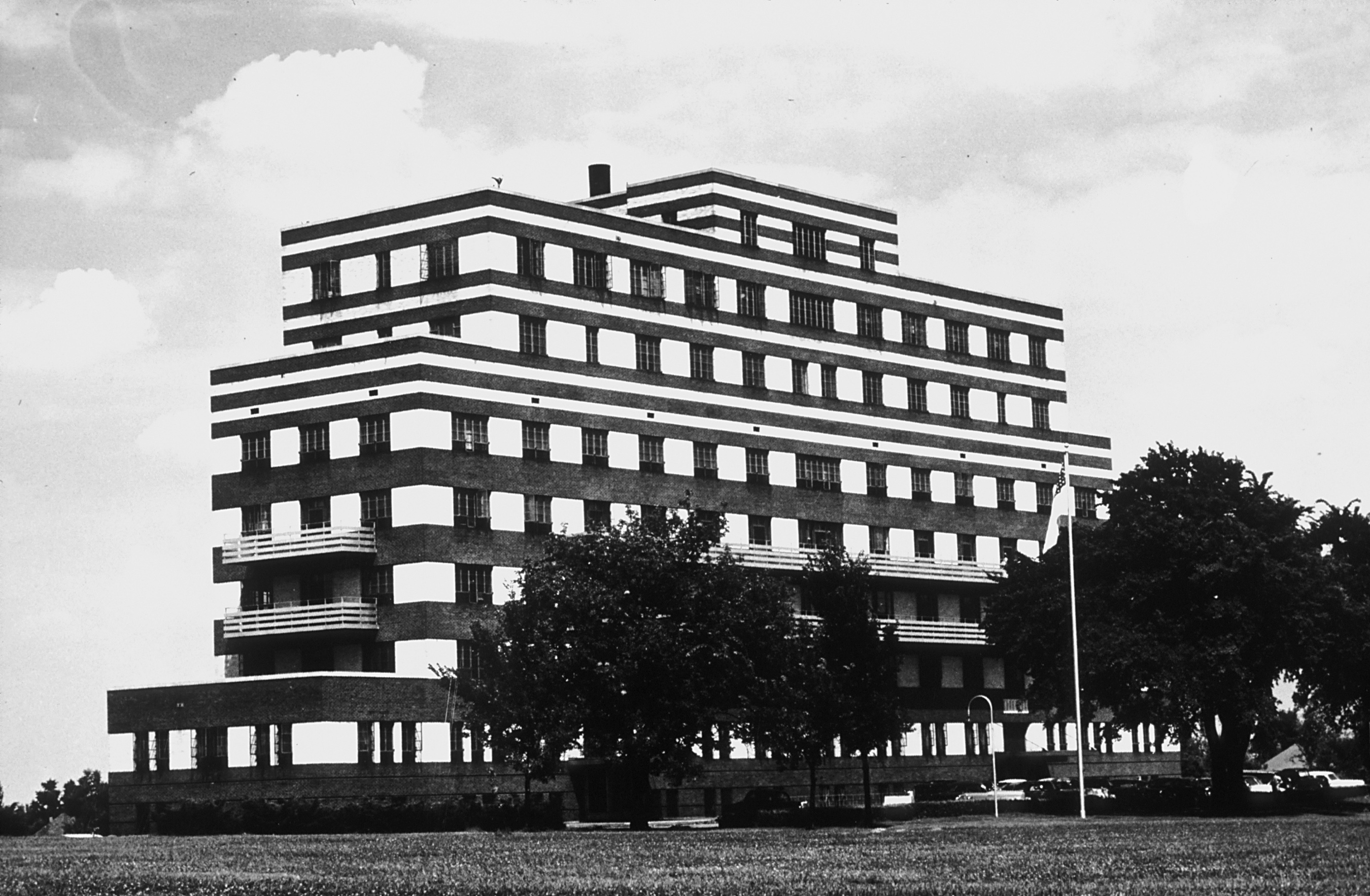
The hospital not long after it opened

Ellis Fischel Cancer Center joined University of Missouri Health Care in 1990. All inpatient services were moved to University Hospital; outpatient services, such as radiation clinics and screening services, were still located at the facility off of Business Loop 70.

After funding was cut from the Missouri State budget, University of Missouri curators decided in May 2010 to float a bond issue for $31 million to pay for the new Ellis Fischel construction.

The new Ellis Fischel Cancer Center is now connected to University of Missouri Hospital and takes up three floors of the Patient Care Tower Addition. The first floor and second floor are designated for clinics, and the eighth floor is the inpatient oncology unit.

=== The Wyatt Guest House ===
The Ernest and Eugenia Wyatt Guest House is located next to the old Ellis Fischel Cancer Center on Business Loop 70. The Guest House is available for EFCC patients experiencing long-term outpatient care, such as chemotherapy, and families of EFCC inpatients. The house has twelve rooms available for guest use, with each room equipped with two double beds, private bath, telephone, TV, linens and other "hotel like" amenities. Common areas include the kitchen, TV rooms, library, living room, internet and laundry facilities. The Wyatt Guest house was later closed in June 2020.

=== Mizzou North ===
After Ellis Fischel Cancer Center moved in with University of Missouri Hospital, the building that it once occupied stood vacant for about two years. After further planning, the University of Missouri bought the building from University of Missouri Health Care and started Mizzou North. Mizzou North now houses offices, as well as the University of Missouri's Law Enforcement Training Institute. In early 2022, it was announced it would be closed and torn down. Demolition is expected to be done by 2024.
