= Lemuel Moss =

6th President of Indiana University
- In office 1875–1884
- Preceded by: Cyrus Nutt
- Succeeded by: David Starr Jordan

2nd President of the Old University of Chicago
- In office 1874–1875
- Preceded by: John C. Burroughs
- Succeeded by: Alonzo Abernethy

Personal details
- Born: December 27, 1829 Bullittsville, Kentucky, US
- Died: July 13, 1904 (aged 74) New York City, New York
- Resting place: Flatbush, Brooklyn, New York

Academic background
- Education: University of Rochester; Rochester Theological Seminary

Academic work
- Discipline: Theology
- Institutions: University of Lewisburg; Crozer Theological Seminary; Old University of Chicago; Indiana University

Ecclesiastical career
- Church: Baptist
- Ordained: 1868

Lemuel Moss (December 27, 1829 – July 13, 1904) served as the sixth president of Indiana University, being the last of a long line of six "Preacher Presidents."

== Early life ==
Lemuel Moss was born in Bullittsville, Kentucky, on December 27, 1829, to Demas and Esther Moss. After the first four years of his childhood, his family moved to Dearborn County, Indiana. Moss worked mainly as a printer in Cincinnati, Ohio, until 1853. He received his B.A. from the University of Rochester in 1858, then a degree from Rochester Theological Seminary in 1860. Moss served as the pastor of the First Baptist Church of Worcester, Massachusetts, from 1860 to 1864 and of a church in Woodbury, New Jersey, from 1864 to 1866. In 1864 and 1865, he served as the secretary of the U.S. Christian Committee.

== Academic career ==
Moss began his career in academia in 1865, becoming professor of theology at the University of Lewisburg (now Bucknell University). He served 1868, the same year he received his D.D. from the University of Rochester. Between 1868 and 1872, Moss served as editor of the National Baptist as well as professor of New Testament interpretation at the Crozer Theological Seminary in Upland, Pennsylvania. In 1874, Moss became president of the University of Chicago. He left the next year to become president of Indiana University. While on the job, he received his LL.D. from the University of Rochester in 1883. He remained there until 1884, when a scandal broke with a female professor that brought him to resign his post. After a few years away from academia, he returned as lecturer of Christian Sociology at Bucknell University, where he remained until his death on July 12, 1904.

=== Presidency ===
Upon President Cyrus Nutt's death in August 1875, Lemuel Moss was elected president of Indiana University. During his first year as president, he made a strong impression upon the students and faculty at the university, viewed as a strong teacher and extremely adept at public speaking. Moss was also unyielding in his power and a firm disciplinarian, who was sometimes viewed as arrogant. However, giving his unusual prowess as a platform speaker, Moss accumulated several outstanding achievements during his time at Indiana University.

President Moss was a member of the National Council of Education (1880–1884), vice president of the American Baptist Missionary Union (1883–1884), and president of the department of higher education, a part of the National Education Association (1883–1884). Several small changes occurred at the university during his presidency: the curriculum was somewhat expanded, an attempt was made to increase salaries for professors and reduce faculty work loads, and several men were added to the faculty as well as young men added to the teaching staff as assistants. The Indiana Student, conceived in 1867 and now better known as the Indiana Daily Student, was revived in 1882 after a hiatus.

An Indiana University alumni convention convened in January 1883 in order to promote interests of the university. The most immediate success of this convention was the passage of a bill by the 1883 legislature giving a tax of one-half cent on each $100 of appraised value in order to create an endowment for the university. This tax was scheduled to last for thirteen years; at its enactment, it was estimated to produce over a half a million dollars.

The new science building that was built on Seminary Square in 1873 was struck by lightning and destroyed by a fire on July 12, 1883. The loss of this building was an estimated $100,000. After this event, the trustees felt they should rebuild on a larger campus. On February 4, 1884, an area of 20 acres (8.1 ha) known as "Dunn's Woods" were purchased. An additional site for buildings was available for purchase, amounting to $70,000, twenty of which went to insure the site with the additional fifty thousand donated by Monroe County. The first buildings on this site, Owen and Wylie Halls, were completed in 1885. Although Lemuel experienced the aforementioned successes while at Indiana University, the Law and Medicine departments at the university were ended (both revived in later years) and fewer than six new students enrolled during his presidency at Indiana University.

=== Moss Killers controversy ===
In November 1884 amid rumors of an improper relationship with Katharine Merrill Graydon, a professor of Greek at Indiana University, Moss resigned abruptly as President of Indiana University. Affidavits were presented to the board of trustees detailing the inappropriate behavior observed between the two by students M. W. Fordyce and Ed. Hall in order to bring charge of "improper and immoral conduct" by Moss. The affidavits states the two witnessed Moss and Graydon kissing and hugging as well Graydon sitting on Moss' lap in her office. These two were members of a group that called themselves the Moss Killers along with four fellow students and janitor Thomas Spicer. The group had drilled a hole in the ceiling of Graydon's office in order to observe her and Moss. Given the resignation of those involved, the board of trustees decided against continuing the investigation of the charges. Moss did not contest his dismissal, but Graydon left under protest stating that Moss had threatened her with dismissal from her position if she refused his advances. Moss fled Indianapolis, even before his family could sell their home, leaving them to join him later.

In addition to creating controversy because of his role as President of the University, at the time he was President of the National Baptist Association. In December 1884, the Baptist Council conducted its own investigation into the relationship between Moss and Graydon; in his defense, he stated, "I have confessed that I was guilty of an indiscretion but that was all". He was later reinstated by the council.

== Publications ==
In addition to serving as editor of the National Baptist from 1868 to 1902, Moss published and edited many other works. He served as the editor of the Baptist and the Centenary in 1876 as well as serving as the writer of other various magazine articles and reviews. From 1889 to 1893, Dr. Moss was the editor of a Baptist publication, The Examiner. In 1897, Moss was the editor of the Philadelphia publication The Baptist Commonwealth.

Moss was the author of several works during his lifetime, one of which is the eight-volume Annals of the Christian Commission. He also wrote A Day with Paul and The Baptists of the National Centenary: A Record of Christian Work.

== Later life ==
While serving as a professor of Christian sociology at Bucknell, Moss also contributed to the work of the American Baptist Historical Society, serving as president from 1895 to 1900 and vice president from 1900 to 1904. Although he suffered considerable physical ailments during his later years in life, Lemuel Moss used his remaining energy on behalf of the Baptist denominations. He died on July 13, 1904, in New York City and was buried in Flatbush, Brooklyn.

Academic offices
Preceded by Cyrus Nutt	President of Indiana University; 1875–1884	Succeeded by David Starr Jordan
