= Camillo C. C. Carr =

US Army brigadier general (1842–1914)

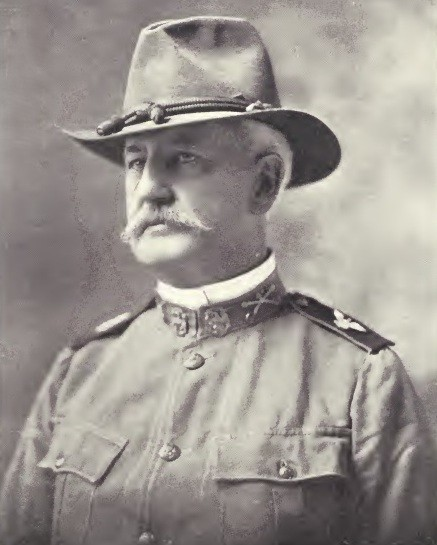
- Carr in 1898. From 1905's Biographical Sketches of Distinguished Officers of the Army and Navy.
- Born: 4 March 1842; Harrisonburg, Virginia, US
- Died: 24 July 1914 (aged 72); Chicago, Illinois, US
- Burial place: Fort Leavenworth National Cemetery
- Education: Old University of Chicago (attended)
- Spouse: Marie Caroline Vivans (m. 1878–1893)
- Military career
- Allegiance: Union (American Civil War); United States
- Service: Union Army; United States Army
- Service years: 1862–1865 (Union Army); 1865–1906 (US Army)
- Rank: Brigadier General
- Unit: US Army Cavalry Branch
- Commands: Troop I, 1st U.S. Cavalry Regiment; Camp Winfield Scott, Nevada; Fort McDermitt, Nevada; Camp Verde, Arizona; Ad hoc Battalion, 5th Cavalry Regiment; 4th Cavalry Regiment; Cavalry and Field Artillery School of Application; Fort Riley; Department of the Missouri; Department of Dakota
- Conflicts: American Civil War; American Indian Wars; Spanish–American War; Military Government of Porto Rico; Philippine–American War

Camillo Casatti Cadmus Carr (4 March 1842 – 24 July 1914) was a career officer in the United States Army. A veteran of the American Civil War, American Indian Wars, Spanish–American War, and Philippine–American War, he served in the Union Army from 1862 to 1865 and the US Army from 1865 until retiring in 1906. Carr attained the rank of brigadier general, and his commands included the 4th Cavalry Regiment, Cavalry and Field Artillery School of Application, Department of the Missouri, and Department of Dakota.

A native of Harrisonburg, Virginia, Carr was raised and educated in Harrisonburg and Chicago, and attended the Old University of Chicago until the start of his senior year, when he joined the Union Army for the American Civil War. Carr enlisted in the 1st U.S. Cavalry Regiment and served in the grades from private to regimental sergeant major before receiving his second lieutenant's commission in November 1863. Carr served in the Valley campaigns of 1864 and was wounded twice, including severe wounds to both legs during the May 1864 Battle of Todd's Tavern.

Carr continued to serve after the end of the war, primarily at Cavalry posts in Arizona and Nevada during the American Indian Wars. During the Spanish–American War in 1898, Carr was president of a board at Fort Leavenworth that considered lieutenants and captains for promotions. In 1899, he commanded six troops of the 5th Cavalry Regiment during the post-Spanish–American War Military Government of Porto Rico. In 1900, Carr commanded the 4th Cavalry in Manila during the Philippine–American War. After returning to the United States, Carr commanded the Cavalry and Field Artillery School of Application and the post at Fort Riley. He went on to command the Department of the Missouri and the Department of Dakota. Carr was promoted to brigadier general in 1903 and served until reaching the mandatory retirement age of 64 in 1906.

== Early life ==
Camillo C. C. Carr (Note: Carr's name appears in records and news accounts as Camillo Casatti Cadmus Carr, Camillo C. C. Carr, Camillo C. Carr, C. C. Carr, and C. C. C. Carr.) was born in Harrisonburg, Virginia on 4 March 1842, a son of Dr. Wattson Carr and Maria (Graham) Carr. He was raised in Virginia until 1857, when his family moved to Chicago, and he was educated at academies in Wheeling, West Virginia (then part of Virginia) and Chicago. He attended the Old University of Chicago from 1859 to 1862, but left shortly before starting his senior year to join the military for the American Civil War. (Note: In 1873, the Old University of Chicago awarded Carr the honorary degree of Master of Arts.) On August 15, 1862, Carr enlisted as a private in the 1st U.S. Cavalry Regiment, in which his older brother Milton was then serving as a captain. He advanced through the enlisted ranks to regimental sergeant major and was serving in this role during the regiment's participation in the July 1863 Battle of Gettysburg. He was commissioned as a second lieutenant in the 1st Cavalry on 31 October 1863.

== Start of career ==
Detachment of 1st U.S. Cavalry, Brandy Station, Virginia February 1864. Carr is near center left, front row, wearing light colored coat.

Carr served in Virginia after his receiving his commission, including the Valley campaigns of 1864. He was wounded twice, once seriously in the legs during the Battle of Todd's Tavern in May 1864. After recuperating, he was assigned to the 1st Cavalry's regimental staff, and was subsequently appointed regimental quartermaster, the role in which he was serving when the 1st Cavalry took part in the October 1864 Battle of Cedar Creek. After the end of the war, Carr continued his military service and served with the 1st Cavalry as it traveled through New Orleans and San Francisco to Drum Barracks, California, where they prepared for movement to garrison duty in Arizona Territory. While in California, Carr was promoted to first lieutenant in the 1st Cavalry's Company E. After a march of nearly two months, the 1st Cavalry, including Carr, arrived at Fort McDowell in May 1866.

The remote Fort McDowell post had been hastily and poorly constructed, and the soldiers who made up the garrison spent most of their time constructing buildings and attempting to bolster their food supply by tending a garden. According to Carr's later reminiscences, the fort was impossible to secure and was a constant target for local Apaches, who sought opportunities to pilfer items including glass and scrap metal for use in making arrowheads. Carr was appointed post quartermaster and subsistence officer, responsible for procuring food and supplies. When the garden failed, a scurvy outbreak started, so the post surgeon insisted on purchase of foods that would combat the illness, including lime juice and wagon loads of onions, potatoes, and pickles. Despite the exorbitant prices he had to pay, Carr's army and War Department superiors approved because it was necessary to restore the health of Fort McDowell's soldiers.

In October 1866, Carr took part in combat against the Apache at a ranchería near the Sierra Ancha Mountains, and he was also a participant in a December battle against the Apache at a ranchería near the Mazatzal Mountains. During his time in Arizona, Carr also took part in exploration of remote areas and planning for construction of roads between army posts. In January 1868, he was tasked with exploring a viable wagon road over the rugged terrain between Fort McDowell and Camp Verde. While attempting to cross the swollen Verde River during heavy rains, Carr's command hastily constructed a log raft to transport equipment. The raft struck a submerged rock and capsized, throwing men and cargo overboard. The men were rescued, but the supplies were completely lost. Carr abandoned the road as impractical, and subsequent efforts to finish it also failed, so a direct link between the two posts was never completed. (Note: In later writings, Carr told a different version of the story, saying "an opening appeared in the surface of the water and the raft went down bow foremost, never to be seen again" — as if a sudden whirlpool or hydraulic anomaly was responsible.)

== Continued career ==
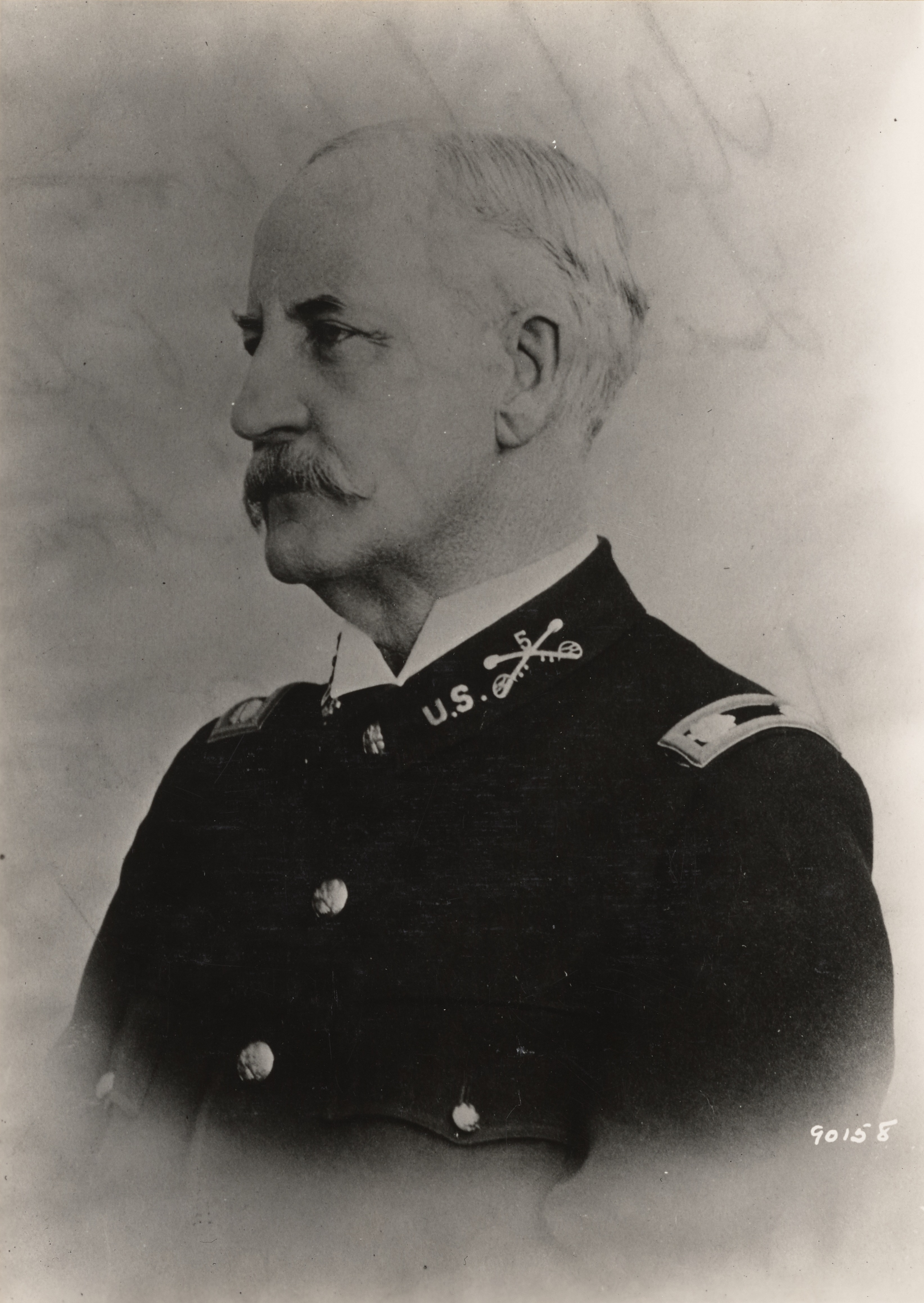
Carr as a lieutenant colonel with the 5th Cavalry Regiment in 1898

In 1868, Carr performed temporary recruiting duty at Carlisle Barracks, Pennsylvania. In April 1869, Carr was promoted to captain and assigned to command Troop I, 1st Cavalry Regiment and the post at Camp Winfield Scott in Humboldt County, Nevada. When the post was closed a year later, Carr led his troop to its new garrison at Fort McDermitt, Nevada. In November 1871, Carr's troop was again relocated, this time to Camp Verde, Arizona. In 1872 and 1873, Carr commanded his troop in action against the Apache, who opted not to remain on their reservations after perceived mistreatment in the allocation of food and supplies. In May 1873, he led Troop I when it departed Arizona for California and duty in the Modoc War. Afterward, Carr's troop was posted to Camp Halleck, Nevada to protect migrants on the California Trail and construction crews on the Central Pacific Railroad, where they remained until 1881. In 1877, he took part in the Nez Perce War, and in 1878 he was a participant in the Bannock War.

In November 1878, Carr married Marie Caroline Vivans, who had been married to army officers Samuel B. Waite and Erskine M. Camp, both of whom died. She was the mother of several children who reached adulthood, but had no children with Carr. They were married until her death in 1893, and Carr did not remarry. In late 1881, Carr's troop was part of a large force dispatched to Arizona during a renewed outbreak of hostilities between white settlers and Native Americans. He was still assigned to Camp Halleck in 1883 when he was detailed to temporary duty at locations including Austin, Nevada and Winnemucca, Nevada, where he purchased horses that were transported to Arizona for use by the 3rd and 6th Cavalry. When Camp Halleck was closed during the summer of 1883, Carr's troop was again posted to Fort McDermitt.

In October 1883, Carr was assigned to the Presidio of San Francisco, where he continued to command Troop I. In the summer of 1884, the 1st Cavalry took up stations in Montana, and Carr continued to command Troop I, which was based at Fort Custer. In May 1885, Carr was assigned to the faculty at Fort Leavenworth's School of Infantry and Cavalry Application in Kansas, where he taught Cavalry tactics, hippology, and, and equitation. He was also a leader in the creation of the United States Cavalry Association, the army's first professional organization, and he served as editor of the organization's journal in addition to contributing articles he authored. In 1893, Carr published his translation of French general Antoine Fortuné de Brack's Cavalry Outpost Duties, which Carr and other US officers regarded as an effective handbook for employing Cavalry as an assertive, pragmatic military capability.

== Later career ==
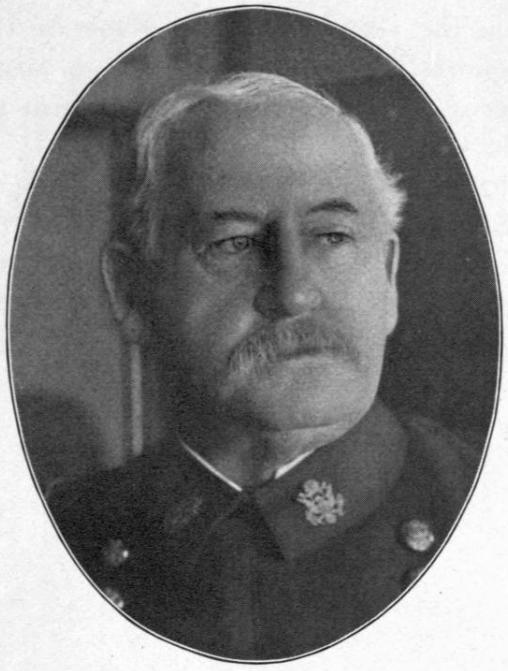
From Volume 3 (1923) of Memorials of Deceased Companions of the Commandery of the State of Illinois

In 1894, Carr was appointed assistant inspector general of the Department of the Columbia. In May 1895, he posted to Fort Meade, South Dakota, where he joined his regiment, the 8th Cavalry. In the spring and early summer of 1898, he was assigned to Spanish–American War duty at Fort Leavenworth as president of an examining board that considered lieutenants and captains for promotion. He was promoted to lieutenant colonel in the 5th Cavalry in November 1898. In 1899, he commanded six troops of the 5th Cavalry as an ad hoc battalion during the post-Spanish–American War Military Government of Porto Rico. In January 1900, he was promoted to colonel and assigned to command the 4th Cavalry. He was subsequently posted to Manila, where he commanded the 4th Cavalry during the Philippine–American War.

In 1901, Carr was appointed to command of the Cavalry and Field Artillery School of Application and the post at Fort Riley. (Note: Carr Hall at Fort Riley was named in Carr's honor and is the headquarters for the post's housing authority and overnight guest quarters.) In 1902, he resumed command of the 4th Cavalry at Fort Riley. In July 1903, he was promoted to brigadier general, after which he resumed command of the Cavalry and Field Artillery School and Fort Riley. In January 1904, Carr was assigned to command the Department of the Missouri with headquarters in Omaha, Nebraska. In February, he was reassigned to command of the Department of Dakota with headquarters in Saint Paul, Minnesota. He served in this position until March 1906, when he reached the mandatory retirement age of 64.

In retirement, Carr was a resident of Chicago. In addition to his membership in the Cavalry Association, he was a member of the Military Order of the Loyal Legion of the United States, Grand Army of the Republic, Society of the Army of the Potomac, and General Society of the War of 1812. Carr died in Chicago on 24 July 1914. He was buried at Fort Leavenworth National Cemetery.

== Works by ==
- de Brack, Antoine Fortuné (1893). Cavalry Outpost Duties. Translated by Carr, Camillo C. C. New York, New York: John Wiley & Sons – via Google Books.

== Dates of rank ==
Carr's dates of rank were:

- Brigadier General (Retired), 3 March 1906
- Brigadier General, 17 August 1903
- Colonel, 23 January 1900
- Lieutenant Colonel, 16 October 1898
- Major, 7 February 1891
- Major (Brevet), 27 February 1890
- Captain, 8 April 1869
- First Lieutenant, 8 June 1864
- Second Lieutenant, 12 November 1863
- Private to Sergeant Major, 15 August 1862 to 11 November 1863
