= Richard A. Dawson =

African-American politician

Member of the Arkansas House of Representatives from the Jefferson County district
- In office January 13, 1879 – January 8, 1881 Serving with J. A. Hudson & William C. Payne

Member of the Arkansas Senate from the 20th district
- In office January 6, 1873 – November 10, 1874 Serving with John M. Clayton
- Preceded by: (redistricted)
- Succeeded by: (redistricted)

Personal details
- Born: 1848 Virginia
- Died: 1906 (aged 57–58) Chicago, Illinois
- Party: Republican (until–1900); Democrat (1900– death)
- Education: Oberlin College; Old University of Chicago

Richard A. Dawson (1848 - 1906) was a lawyer and state legislator in Arkansas. He was born in Virginia and his father was a minister. Dawson studied at Oberlin College, and received his law degree from the Old University of Chicago. Dawson practiced law in Pine Bluff, Arkansas and represented the area in the Arkansas General Assembly from 1873 to 1874 and from 1879 to 1881.

== Political career ==
Dawson served alongside other African-American legislators in both houses of the Arkansas General Assembly in the post-Reconstruction era. Dawson represented the 20th district in the Arkansas Senate (Bradley, Grant, Lincoln, and Jefferson counties) alongside John M. Clayton in the 19th Arkansas General Assembly and the 1874 Extraordinary Arkansas General Assembly. Dawson was elected to represent the Jefferson County district in the Arkansas House of Representatives during the 22nd Arkansas General Assembly alongside J. A. Hudson & William C. Payne. A Republican, he switched to become a Democrat by 1900.
