= Anderson Ebberson =

American politician

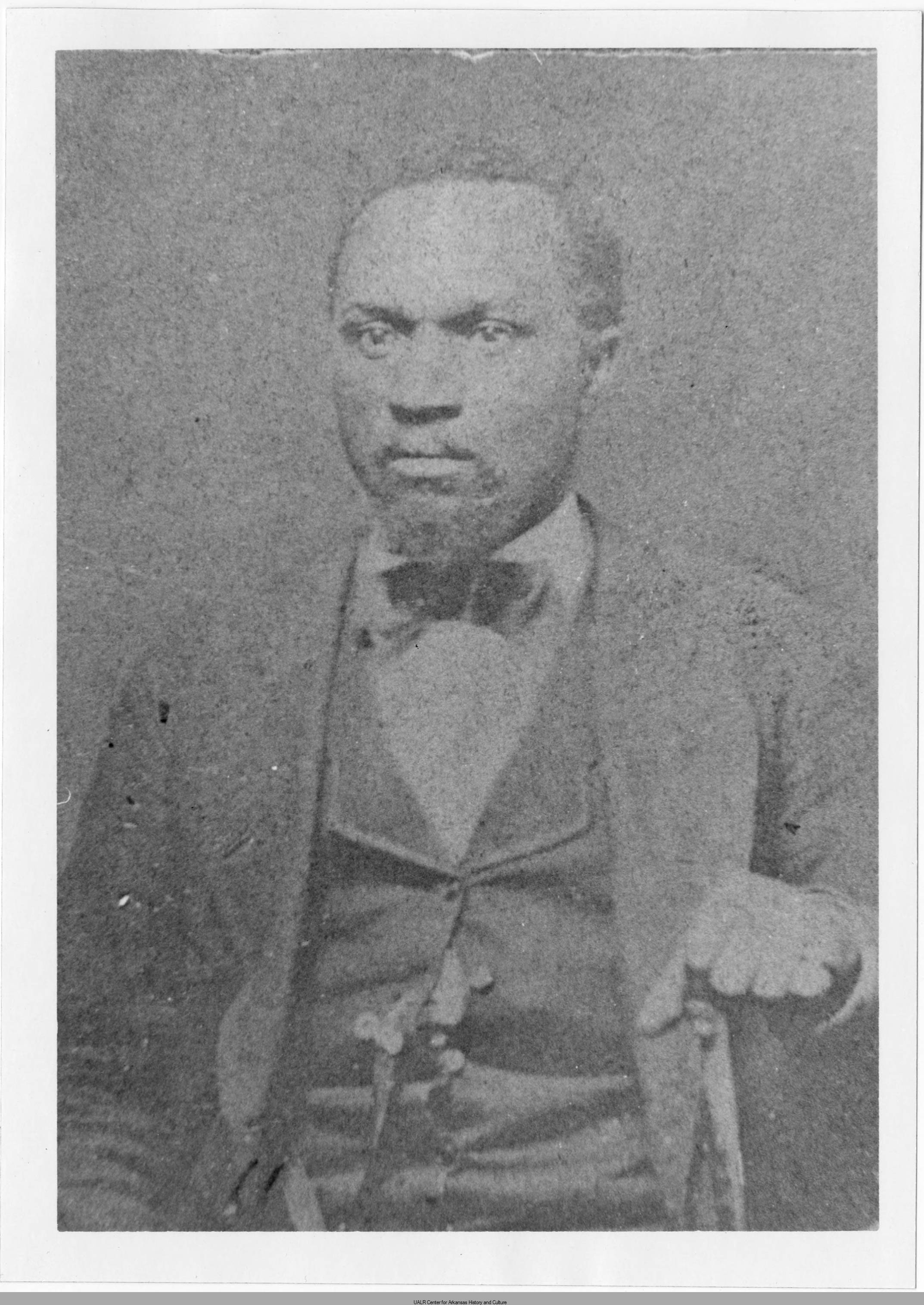
Anderson Ebberson

Anderson Ebberson (c. 1843–1916) was an American politician.

He served in the Arkansas House of Representatives in 1877 and 1881, representing Jefferson County, Arkansas, as a Republican.

In the 1876 elections he was one of eight African-Americans to win seats in the general assembly, seven representatives and one in the senate. He was one of three representatives for Jefferson County, Arkansas, serving alongside C. H. Rice and William Murphy. All three representatives for Jefferson County, Arkansas in 1881, Ebberson, W. C. Payne and Carl Polk were black.

In 1886 he was convicted of involuntary manslaughter of Thomas Cotton and sentenced to one year in prison.

== See also ==
- African American officeholders from the end of the Civil War until before 1900
