= University of Chicago (disambiguation) =

University of Chicago may refer to:

- The University of Chicago, a private university located in the Hyde Park neighborhood of Chicago.
- The Old University of Chicago, a private university that went bankrupt in the 1880s.

There are also four other educational institutions located in Chicago that share names similar to the University of Chicago. None are in any way affiliated with the University of Chicago:

- University of Illinois at Chicago, a public university located in the Little Italy/University Village neighborhood of Chicago that is part of the University of Illinois system.
- Chicago State University, a public university located in the Pullman neighborhood of Chicago.
- Loyola University Chicago, a private, Catholic university located principally on the near north side.
- The Chicago Medical School is a unit of the Rosalind Franklin University of Medicine and Science. (It has never been affiliated with the University of Chicago or its medical school, the Pritzker School of Medicine).
