= Cyrus Nutt =

American academic (1814–1875)

5th President of Indiana University
- In office 1860–1875
- Preceded by: John Hiram Lathrop
- Succeeded by: Lemuel Moss

Personal details
- Born: September 4, 1814 Trumbull County, Ohio, U.S.
- Died: August 24, 1875 (aged 60) Bloomington, Indiana, U.S.
- Resting place: Forest Hill Cemetery; Greencastle, Indiana, U.S.

Academic background
- Education: Allegheny College

Academic work
- Discipline: Greek, Mathematics
- Institutions: Indiana Asbury College; Fort Wayne Female College; Whitewater College; Indiana University

Ecclesiastical career
- Church: Methodist Episcopal Church
- Ordained: 1840

Cyrus Nutt (September 4, 1814 – August 24, 1875) served as the fifth president of Indiana University.

== Biography ==
Cyrus Nutt was born in Southington Township, Trumbull County, Ohio on September 4, 1814. His father was James Nutt and his mother was Mary Viets who married in 1806. Cyrus was the second son, with one brother and two sisters who all lived in a log cabin on a piece of land next to a large farm belonging James father-in-law.

Cyrus Nutt graduated from Allegheny College (B.A. 1836). and became a professor of languages at Asbury (now DePauw) University (1837–1845), pastor of Methodist Episcopal church in Bloomington (1845), professor of Greek at Asbury University (1846–1849), president of Fort Wayne Female College (1849–1850), president of Whitewater College (1850–1855), professor of mathematics and acting president at Asbury University (1857–1860).

In 1860, Nutt was elected president of Indiana University. During his presidency, the university attempted to create an agricultural and mechanical school under the terms of the Morrill Act, though by 1869 Purdue was established as the land grant college of Indiana. In 1867, the board of trustees voted to admit women to classes, and around the same time the university experienced the beginning of organized athletics with students embracing the game of baseball. The junior and senior-class-controlled newspaper The Student also was founded that year.

The final years of Nutt's presidency saw growing tensions with students, though the reasons are unknown. Students published a bogus newspaper in March 1873 titled The Dagger in which they attacked Nutt. In June 1875, Nutt retired from his position at the university and died on August 24, 1875, from remittent fever. He was buried in the Forest Hill Cemetery in Greencastle, Indiana.

== Works ==
Several of Nutt's baccalaureate sermons were published.

== Notes ==
Academic offices
Preceded by John Hiram Lathrop	President of Indiana University; 1860 – 1875	Succeeded by Lemuel Moss
