= Galusha Anderson =

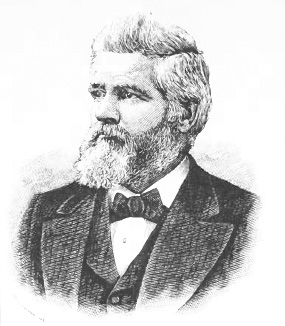
- Born: March 7, 1832; Bergen, New York
- Died: July 20, 1918 (aged 86); Wenham, Massachusetts
- Occupations: Pastor, theologian, university president

Galusha Anderson (March 7, 1832 – July 20, 1918) was an American theologian and university president.

== Biography ==
Anderson was born at Bergen, Genesee County, New York. His father was of Scotch descent and a strict Presbyterian. At a young age he converted to the Baptist faith and was determined to become a minister. Anderson was educated at the University of Rochester, graduating with high honors in 1854, and the Rochester (Baptist) Theological Seminary, graduating in 1856. His ministry began as pastor of the Baptist Church in Janesville, Wisconsin. After two years, he moved to St. Louis to be the pastor of Second Baptist Church.

His account of the Civil War in St. Louis, The Story of a Border City during the Civil War, is considered accurate, vivid, and balanced, even though Anderson was an ardent abolitionist and supporter of the Union. Published in 1908, the account covers the entire duration of the war. "He became distinguished as a preacher of the Baptist denomination, and was called in 1866 from his Church in St. Louis to the professorship of homiletics, Church polity, and pastoral duties, in Newton theological institute."

He held several other pastorates, became president successively of the Old University of Chicago (1878–85) and Denison University (1887–90), professor of practical theology at the new University of Chicago in 1892–1903, when he became emeritus professor. Dr. Anderson was given the degrees of D.D., 1866, and LL.D., 1884, by the University of Rochester.

Following his retirement in 1904, Anderson devoted much of his time to writing. His writings include:

- The Elements of Chrysostom's Power as a Preacher (1903)
- Ancient Sermons for modern Times, a translation from Asterius (1904)
- The Story of a Border City during the Civil War (1908)
- When Neighbors Were Neighbors, a Story of Love and Life in Olden Days (1911)

He died at his son's home in Wenham, Massachusetts on July 20, 1918.
