= Katharine Merrill Graydon =

American classical scholar (1858–1934)

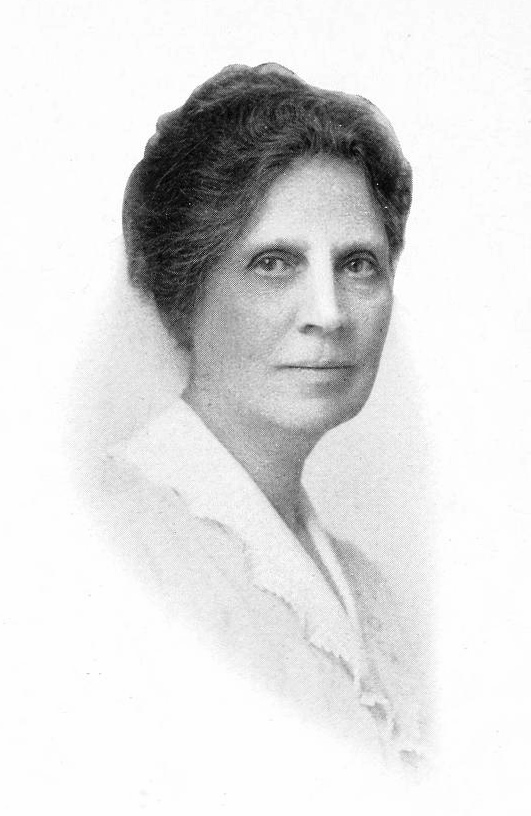
- Born: April 14, 1858; Indianapolis, Indiana, US
- Died: January 25, 1934 (aged 75); Indianapolis, Indiana, US
- Burial place: Crown Hill Cemetery and Arboretum, Section 7, Lot 16, indianapolis, indiana 39.821578°N 86.1751498°W
- Occupations: Academic, scholar, classicist

Academic work
- Discipline: Classics
- Sub-discipline: Greek literature Latin literature
- Institutions: Indiana University; Hastings College; Oakland High School; Oahu College; Butler University

Katharine Merrill Graydon (April 14, 1858 – January 25, 1934) was an American classical scholar who specialised in teaching Greek and Latin literature, as well as a professor of English Literature.

== Career ==
Graydon graduated from the Classical course at Butler University in 1878 and began teaching Greek at a school in Indianapolis replacing her own professor, John O. Hopkins, after his death in November 1877. In 1883 she gained her master's degree from Indiana University Bloomington and was subsequently appointed as the assistant professor of Latin and Greek there.

Graydon's teaching career at Indiana was cut short after her relationship with Lemuel Moss, then president of the university, was exposed by a group of students who spied on the couple through peep holes drilled into the attic above her seminar room. The relationship was published in several national newspapers. Graydon resigned under protest, stating that Moss had threatened her with dismissal from her position if she refused his advances. Moss did not contest his dismissal and fled Indianapolis, even before his family could sell their home.

Graydon briefly attended Radcliffe College in 1885–1886 but returned to Indianapolis before the end of her studies due to poor health. After a gap of two years from academia, Graydon joined Hastings College in Nebraska in 1888 and remained until 1892. After 1892, she spent several years as a private tutor for the children of naturalist John Muir, whom she had known since childhood through her aunt Catharine Merrill, the second female university professor in the United States.

After studying, but not graduating, from the University of Chicago in 1898–1899, Graydon became a teacher of Greek and English at Oahu College in Honolulu. She remained in this position until 1907 when she returned to Butler University to take up a chair in English, named after her by-then deceased aunt Catharine Merrill. In 1928, she received an honorary doctorate in literature from the college.

Whilst at Butler, Graydon edited the Butler Alumnal Quarterly from its first edition in 1922 until her retirement in 1929. During World War I she kept correspondence with Butler students and alumni serving abroad and published these letters, with details of Butler men who had served in the American Civil War and the Spanish–American War, in a 1922 volume. The book was intended to raise funds for memorials to those who had died in these conflicts.

Graydon died in 1934.

=== Legacy ===
Her effect on her students was so profound that former students formed a Katharine Merrill Graydon Club which met off-campus during and after her lifetime. The club discussed her views on literature and learning.

Butler University instituted the Katharine Merrill Graydon Alumni Service Award, which was first awarded in 1938.

== Selected publications ==
- 1889. Thoughts on the service of Homer to humanity: read in the chapel of Hastings College, Neb., April 1, 1889 (pamphlet)
- 1915. "John Muir", Butler Alumnal Quarterly 4(2), 81–92
- 1918. War readings: selections from current literature of 1914-1917. Indianapolis, Butler College.
- 1922. Butler College in the World War: a record of the men and their achievements together with a briefer record of those who served in the Civil War and in the war with Spain. Indianapolis, Butler College Alumni Association.
- 1934 (published posthumously). Catharine Merrill, life and letters: collected and arranged. Greenfield (IN), Mitchell.
