= Charles Richmond Henderson =

American sociologist (1848–1915)

The Reverend Charles Richmond Henderson
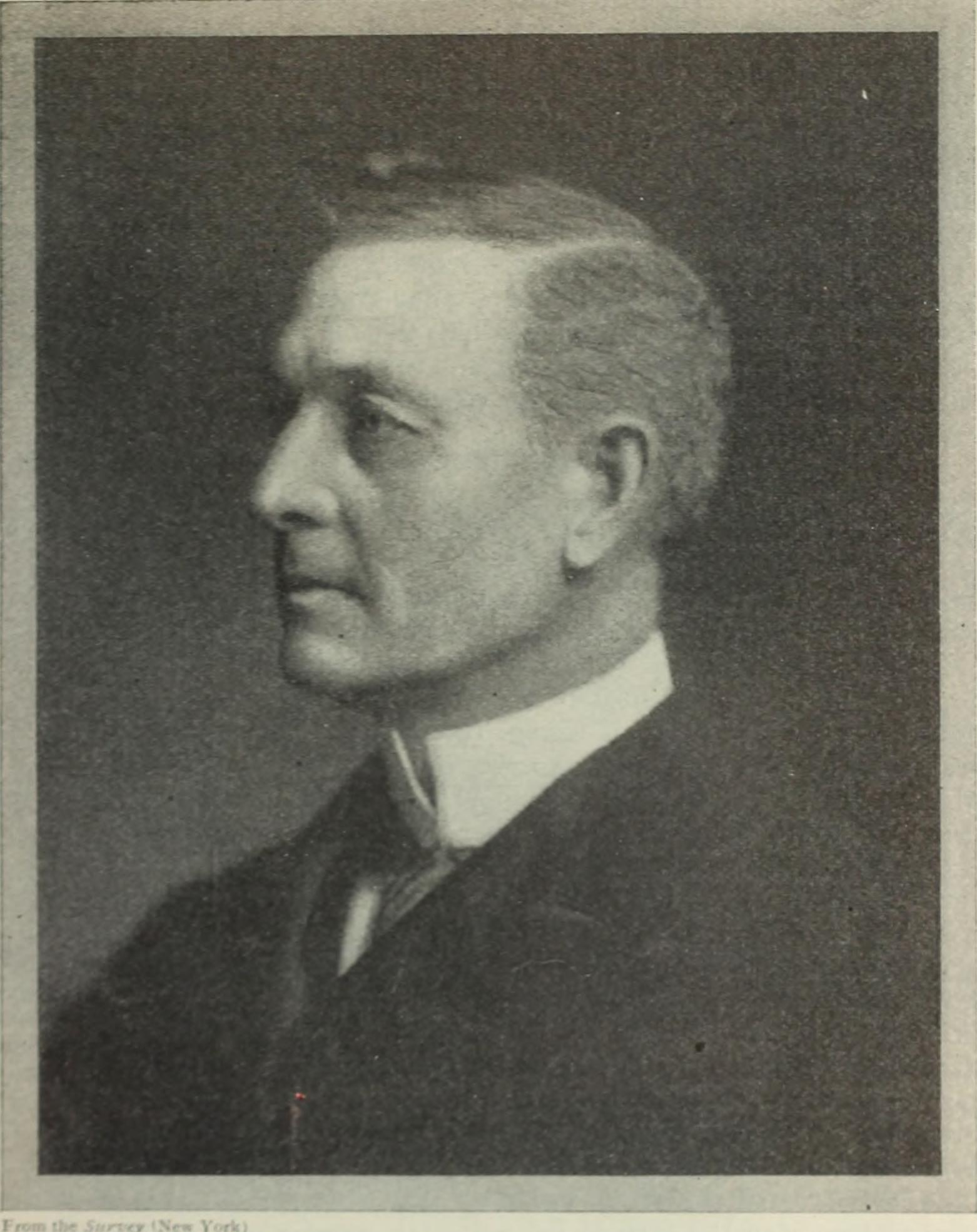
- Born: December 17, 1848; Covington, Indiana, US
- Died: March 29, 1915 (aged 66); Charleston, South Carolina, US
- Spouse: Ella L. Levering (m. 1873)

Ecclesiastical career
- Religion: Christianity (Baptist)
- Ordained: c. 1873

Academic background
- Education: Old University of Chicago; Baptists Union Theological Seminary; Leipzig University
- Influences: Albert Schäffle

Academic work
- Discipline: Sociology
- School or tradition: Chicago school
- Institutions: University of Chicago
- Doctoral students: W. I. Thomas

Charles Richmond Henderson (1848 – 1915) was an American Baptist minister and sociologist. After being a pastor for nearly 20 years in Terre Haute and Detroit, he took an appointment as an assistant professor of sociology at the University of Chicago, where he became a tenured professor. He published several works on society in the United States, the prison system, and the sociology of charities.

== Biography ==
Born in Covington, Indiana, on December 17, 1848, he graduated at the Old University of Chicago with a Bachelor of Arts degree 1870 and a Master of Arts degree in 1873. He earned his Bachelor of Divinity degree at the Baptist Union Theological Seminary in 1873 and was ordained as a minister. From 1873 to 1883 Henderson was pastor at Terre Haute, Indiana, and from c. 1883 to 1892 at Woodward Avenue Baptist Church in Detroit.

Appointed in 1892 assistant professor of sociology at the University of Chicago, he was afterward advanced to a full professorship. In 1898-99 he was president of the National Conference of Charities and Correction, in 1902 president of the National Prison Association, and in 1910 of the International Prison Congress. In 1907 he served as secretary of the Illinois Commission on Occupational Diseases.

He died in Charleston, South Carolina, on March 29, 1915.

== Publications ==
His works include:

- The Development of Doctrine in the Epistles (1894)
- The Social Spirit in America (1896)
- Social Settlements (1897)
- Social Elements (1898)
- An Introduction to the Study of the Dependent, Defective, and Delinquent Classes (1898; second edition, enlarged, 1901)
- Modern Prison Systems (57th Congress, 2d Session, House Document No. 452, 1903)
- Modern Methods of Charity (1904)
- Industrial Insurance in the United States (1907)
- Social Duties from a Christian Point of View (1909)
- Education in Relation to Sex (1909)
- Social Programmes of the West (1913)

== See also ==
- Chautauqua
- Social Gospel
