= Ada Kepley =

American lawyer (1847–1925)

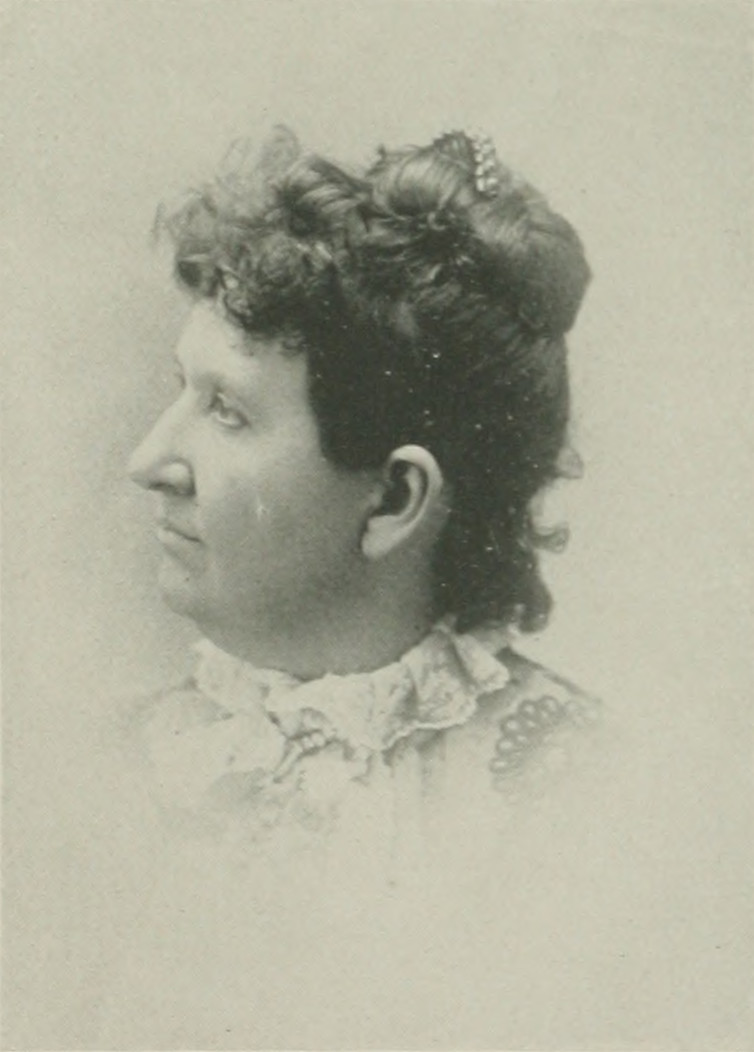
- Portrait photo from A Woman of the Century
- Born: February 11, 1847; Somerset, Ohio, US
- Died: June 13, 1925 (aged 78); Effingham, Illinois, US
- Education: Old University of Chicago/Northwestern University Law School
- Known for: Author, suffragist, first American woman to graduate from law school

Ada Harriet Miser Kepley (February 11, 1847 – June 13, 1925) was the first American woman to graduate from law school. She graduated in 1870 with a law degree, from what is today the Northwestern University School of Law. At that time, she was prohibited from legal practice by state court rule that denied women admittance to the bar. She finally was admitted to the bar in 1881, but did not practice. She was an advocate for women's suffrage and temperance.

== Early life ==
Ada Harriet Miser was born in Somerset, Ohio, in 1847. Her parents were Henry and Ann M. Miser. She had a sister, Nora Miser Scott. Her family moved to St. Louis, Missouri, in 1860, and in 1867, Ada married Henry B. Kepley, who had his own law practice in Effingham, Illinois. At his urging, Ada attended the Old University of Chicago's law department (now Northwestern) in Chicago from 1869 to 1870. There she earned her Bachelor of Laws in 1870. She was the first woman to graduate from law school in the United States. However, Illinois state law denied her admission to the state bar because she was a woman. In response, her husband Henry Kepley drafted a bill banning sex discrimination in professional occupations; it became state law in 1872. Kepley, who was more interested in social reform than legal practice, did not apply for admission to the bar in Illinois until 1881, when she gained easy admission. She also was an ordained Unitarian minister.

== Reformer ==
Kepley's legacy was not in the practice of law, but rather in her passion for temperance and women's suffrage. Her temperance crusade centered around her establishment of the Band of Hope, a youth-oriented temperance group, which focused on educating the youth of the Effingham, Illinois, area concerning the hazards of alcohol addiction. In conjunction with her organization, she also published a monthly temperance newspaper entitled The Friend of Home which openly attacked the dram shops (saloons) and their patrons. In 1897, an angered saloon-keeper's son broke into Kepley's home and attempted to shoot her with a gun, but missed and shot one of her dogs in the foot.

Kepley's association with nationally known women's movement icons Frances Willard (of the Woman's Christian Temperance Union or WCTU) and Susan B. Anthony (co-founder of the National Woman Suffrage Association) gained Kepley national recognition in these organizations. Frances Willard attended a WCTU rally in Effingham at Kepley's request. Upon the death of her husband Henry in 1906, the bereaved Ada moved to the Kepley's farm between Watson and Mason, Illinois (now known as Wildcat Hollow State Forest). There, Kepley wrote her autobiography, entitled A Farm Philosopher, A Love Story (since edited and re-published), which she published in 1912. The book was printed by Worman's Printery in Teutopolis, Illinois. Of the land that is now Wildcat Hollow she writes

My farm is in Mason township, Effingham County, Illinois. It has prairie, bottom and upland fields, and much pasture land. The little Wabash River and Fulfer Creek run through it. There is much timber on it, grand old trees, and trees coming on; lovely ravines with gray old rocks – and ferns and mosses and wild flowers and pools of water where the cattle and other stock drink, and things that minister to the sense and love of grandeur and beauty. From my upper window I can see the gray old covered wagon bridge, a relic of the past, that crosses the Wabash River, and just beyond that are the great arches of the magnificent concrete, Illinois Central Railroad bridge that stretch across the river like an old Roman Aqueduct – the old and new in sharp contrast.

== Poverty and death ==
Within the next few years, she lost her beloved farm and was forced to move to a small home in Effingham. Kepley died in St. Anthony's Memorial Hospital in 1925, and she is buried in Oak Ridge Cemetery in Effingham, next to her husband, Henry. Kepley's health and financial issues in her final years are allegorical to the very causes she so passionately fought for, and although she did not live to see the full impact of the national women's suffrage movement, her influence on the movement during its early years helped pave the way for one of the greatest political achievements in United States history: the 19th Amendment.

== Works ==
- A Farm Philosopher, A Love Story, Ada H. Kepley, 1912

== See also ==
- Bradwell v. Illinois (1873)
- Women in the United States judiciary
