= Fort Verde State Historic Park =

NRHP-designated site in Yavapai County, Arizona

- Fort Verde District
- U.S. National Register of Historic Places
- U.S. Historic district
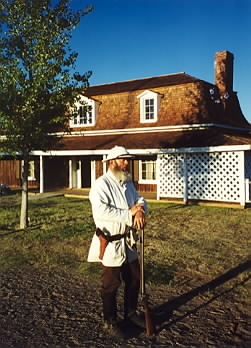
- Commanding officer's house and Dennis Lockhart portraying General Crook

- Location within Arizona Location within the United States
- Interactive map showing the location of Fort Verde State Historic Park
- Location: Bounded by Hance, Coppinger, and Woods Streets, Camp Verde, Arizona
- Coordinates: 34°33′55″N 111°51′09″W
- Area: 12 acres (4.9 ha)
- Built: 1872
- Visitation: 10,320 (2022)
- NRHP reference No.: 71000120
- Added to NRHP: October 7, 1971

Fort Verde State Historic Park in the town of Camp Verde, Arizona is a small park that attempts to preserve parts of the Apache Wars-era fort as it appeared in the 1880s. The park was established in 1970 and was added to the National Register of Historic Places a year later.

== History ==
Fort Verde was established at its current location in 1871. It is significant as "the best preserved and least altered of any military post associated with General Crook’s 1872-73 campaign against the northern Apaches."

Settlers in the mid-19th century near the Verde River grew corn and other crops with the prospect of getting good prices from nearby Prescott, which was the territorial capital, and from nearby miners. The rapid increase in population for the mining economy disrupted the hunting and gathering environments of the local Native American tribes, the Dilzhe'e Apache and Yavapai. In turn, they raided the farmers' crops for food.

The farmers requested military protection from the United States Army and, in 1865, although Arizona was still only a territory, the infantry arrived. They set up several posts over the next few years:

- 1865, a small camp five miles (8 km) south of what is today Camp Verde.
- 1866–1871, Camp Lincoln, a mile north of today's Fort Verde.
- 1871–1873, Camp Verde, built gradually from 1871 to 1873.
- 1879, Camp Verde, renamed Fort Verde
- 1891, Fort Verde abandoned
- 1899, sold at public auction

After approximately 1,500 local natives were placed on a reservation by 1872, the army's role changed from protecting the settlers to ensuring that the Indians stayed on the reservation. The last major military engagement with uprising natives took place in 1882 at the Battle of Big Dry Wash.

The fort was never enclosed by walls or stockades, and it never saw fighting on site. At its height, it consisted of twenty-two buildings, only four of which survived until 1956, when local citizens created a small museum in the administration building. They later donated the buildings and ten acres (40,000 m^{2}) as a State Park.

Some of the buildings were built with pice, which is large adobe slabs cast within wooden frames, rather than assembled from the more familiar individual adobe bricks.

== Historic structures in Fort Verde State Historic Park ==
The following structures and markers are pictured:

- The "0" Mile General Crook Trail Marker which is located in the place where in 1871 General George Crook established a military supply trail which connected Forts Whipple, Verde and Apache. The marker is located close to the Fort Verde Administration Building.
- The main Administration Building. It contained the main offices from which the decisions as to the operations of the fort were made. It now houses the Visitor Center of the Fort Verde Museum and contains exhibits, period artifacts from military life, and history on the Indian Scouts and Indian Wars era.
- Inside the Commanding officers office in the Administration Building of Fort Verde.
- Display of uniforms once used by the men who served in Fort Verde. The display is in the old Administration Building.
- The Commanding Officer Quarters.
- The Bachelor Officers’ Quarters.
- The Doctor's & Surgeons Quarters.
Historic structures in Fort Verde State Historic Park.
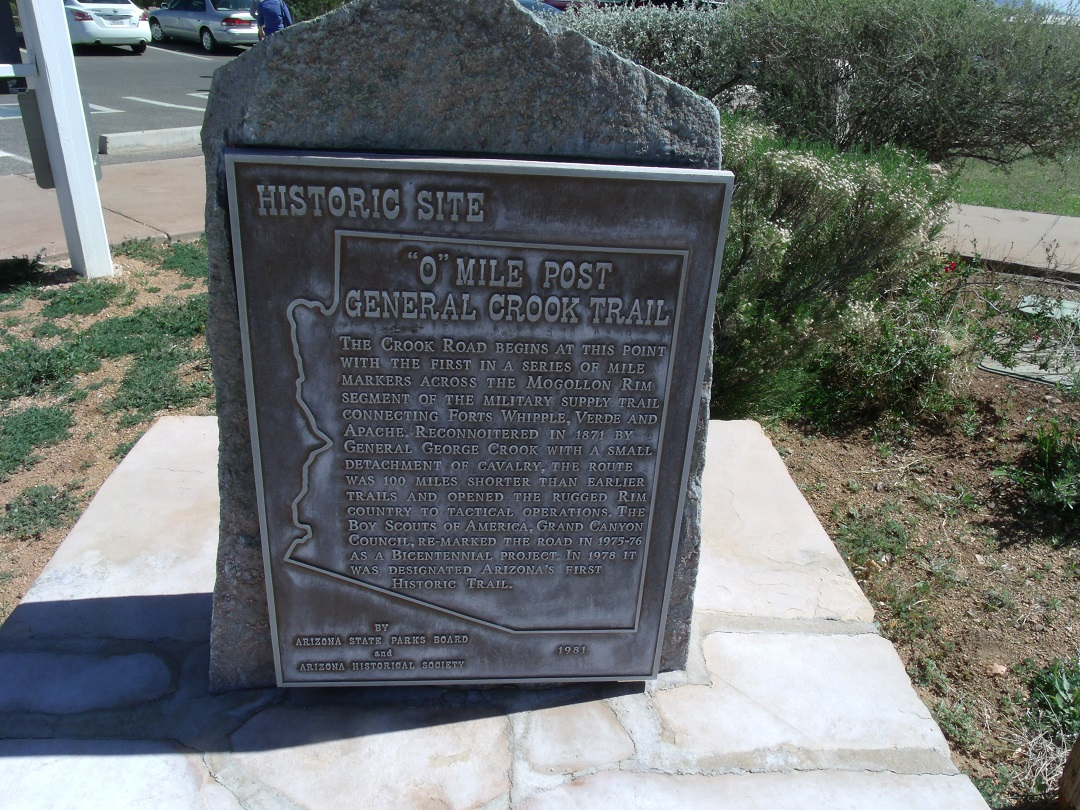
This "0" Mile General Crook Trail Marker.

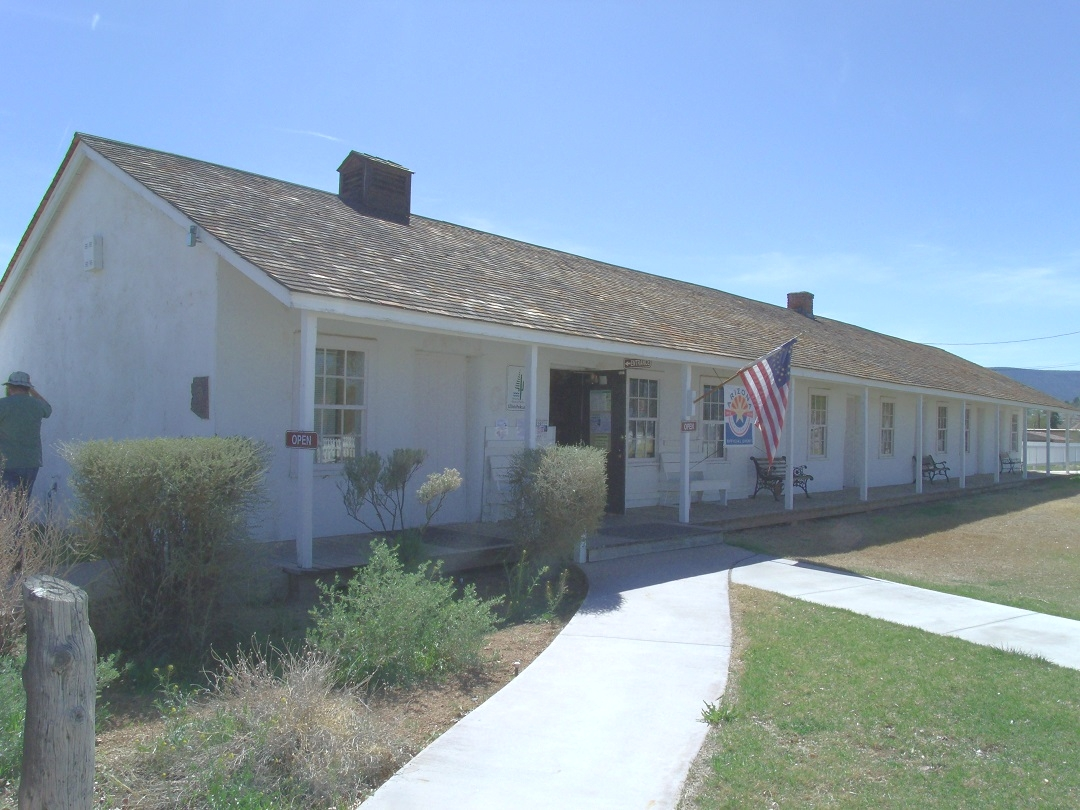
The main Administration Building.

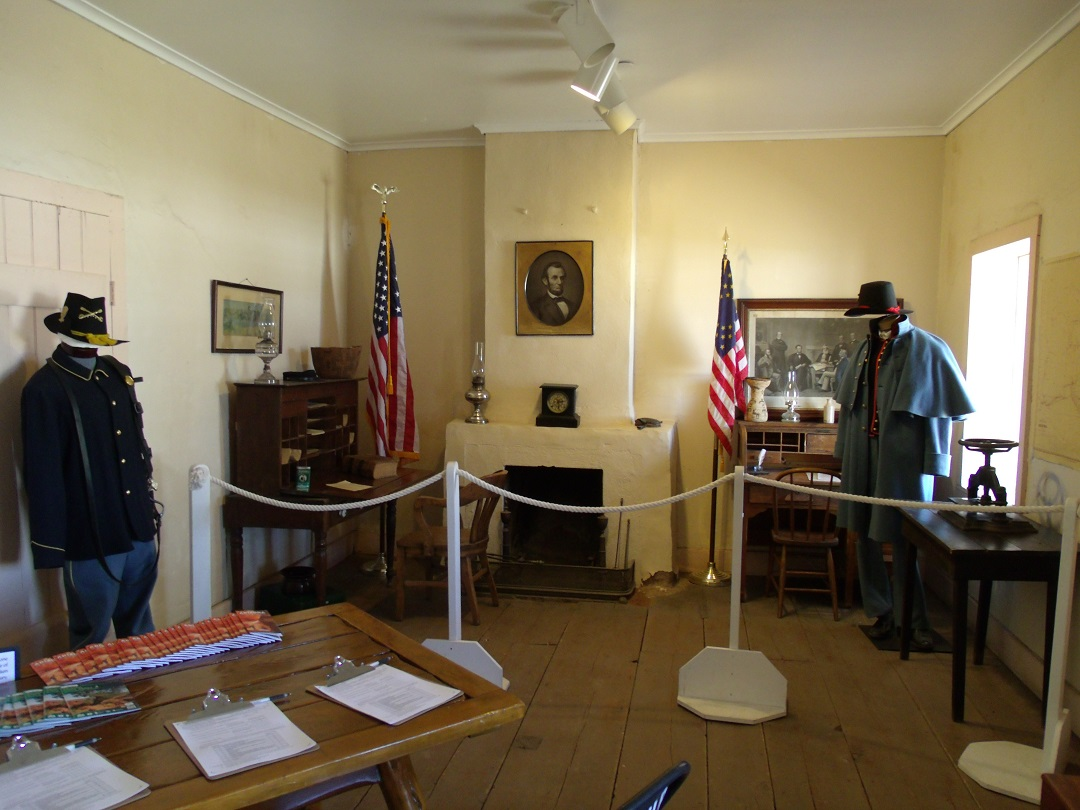
Inside the Commanding officers office.

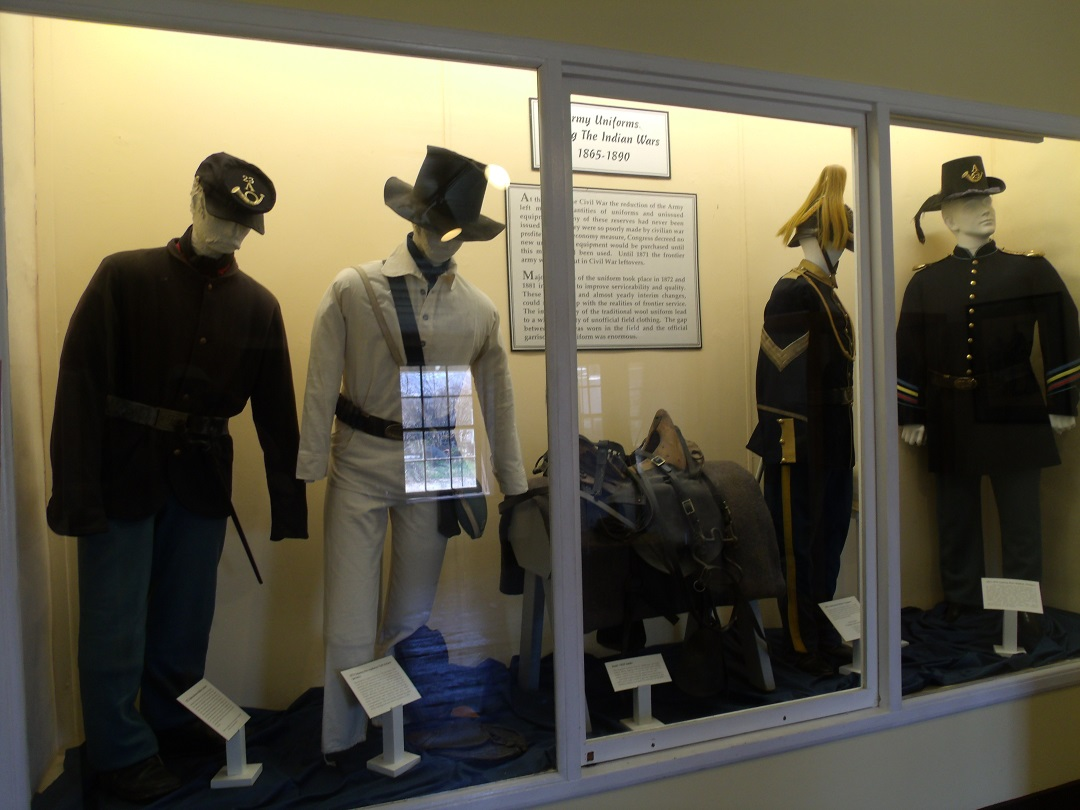
Display of uniforms.

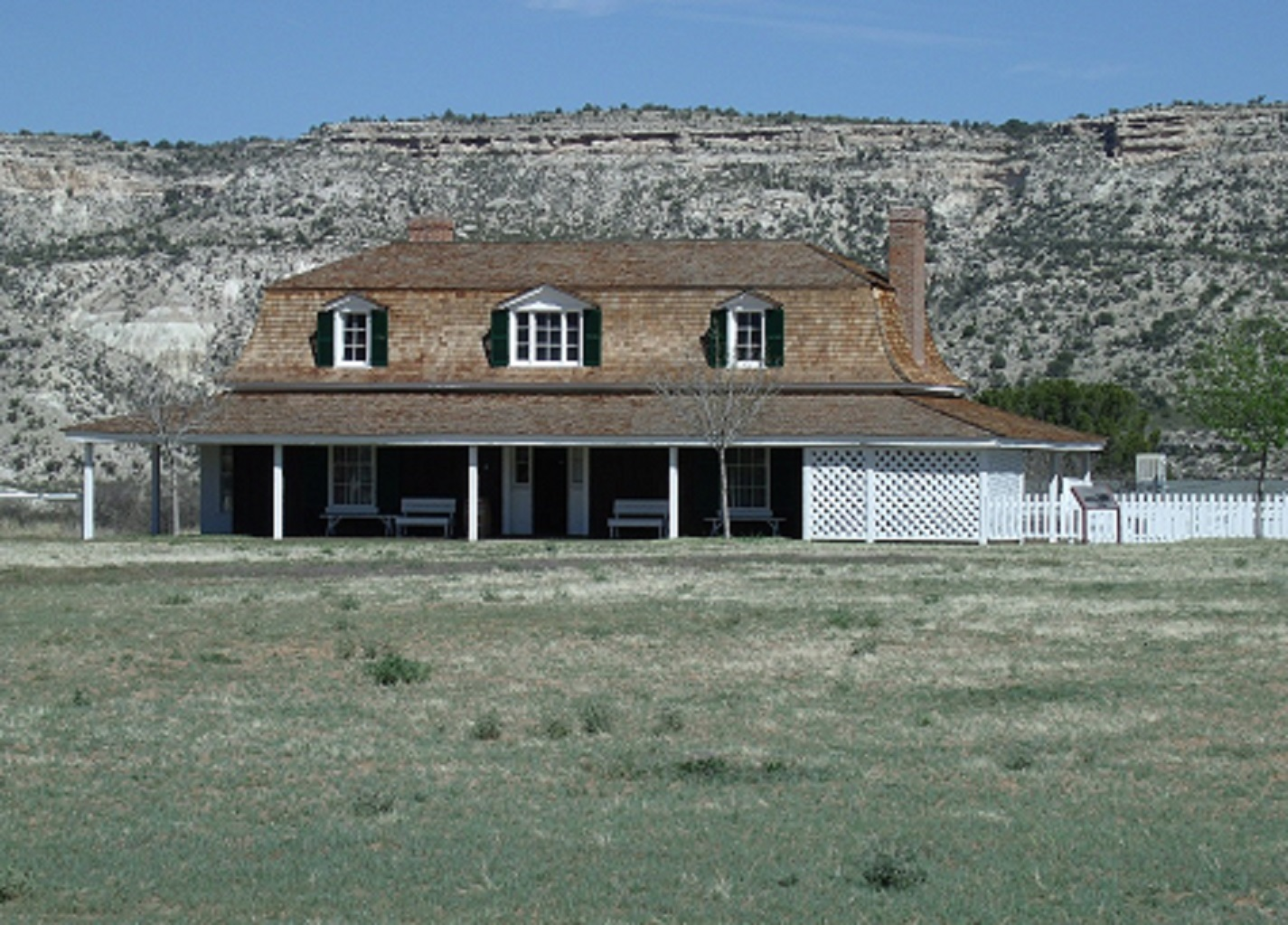
Commanding Officer Quarters.

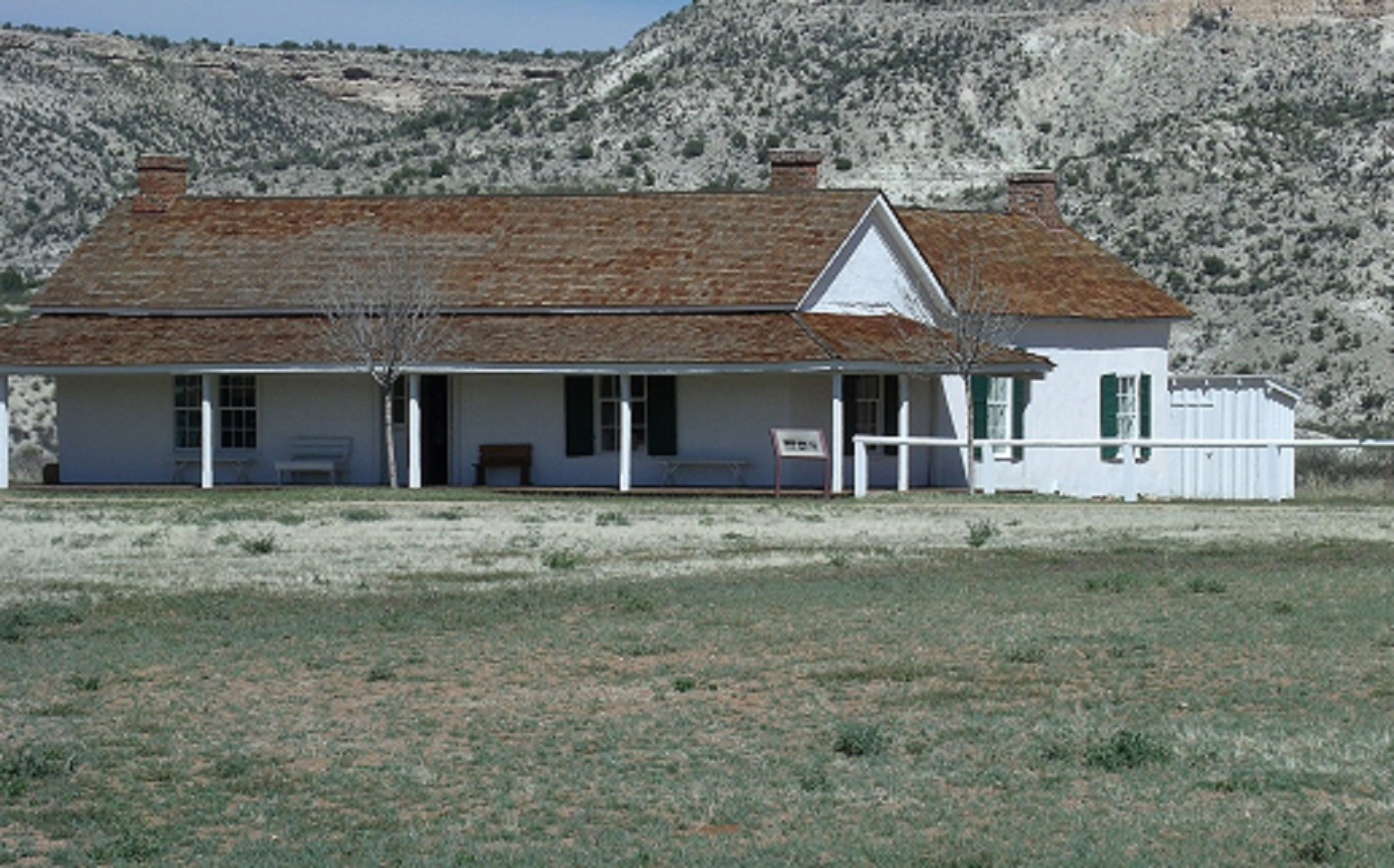
Bachelor Officers’ Quarters.

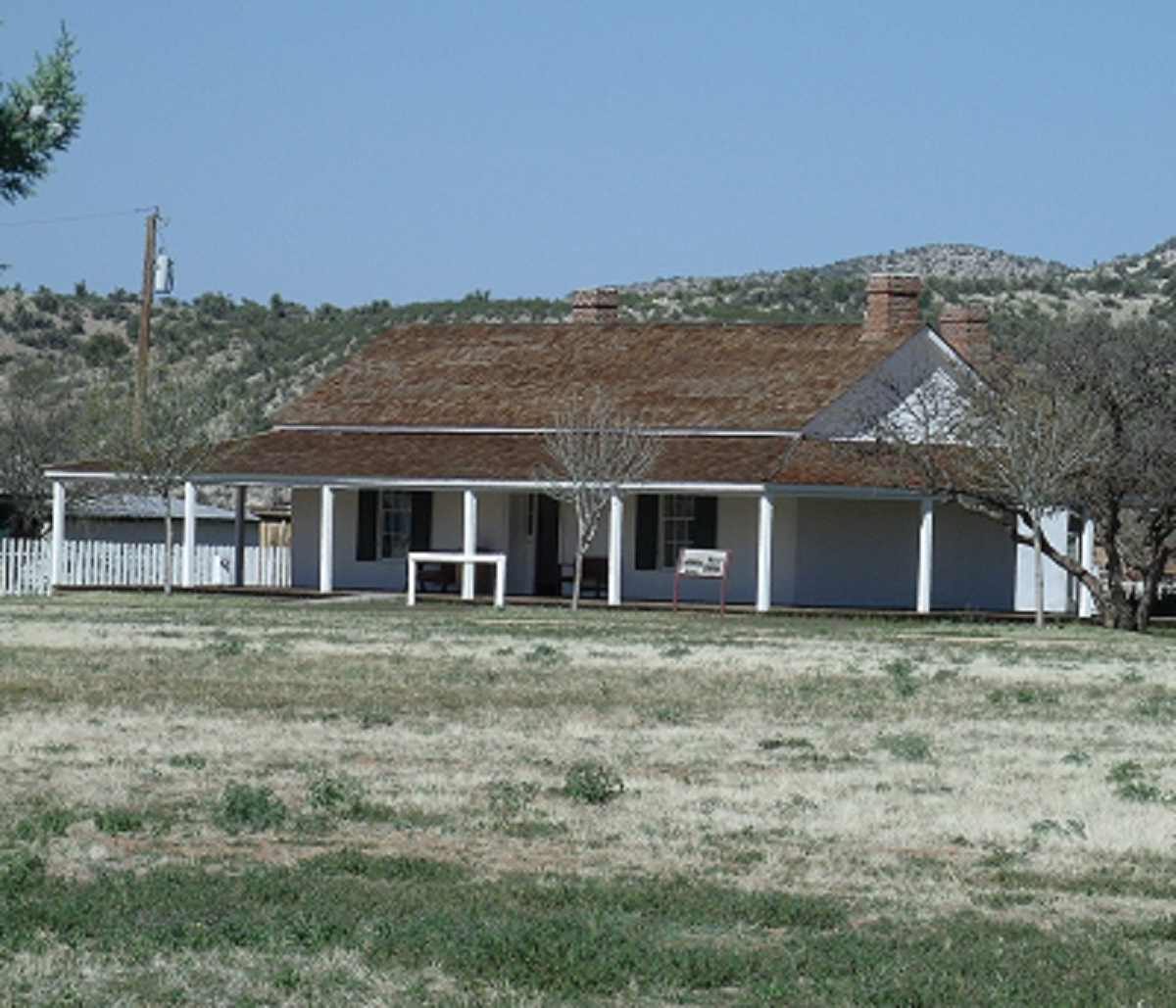
Doctor’s & Surgeons Quarters
