= Bullittsville, Kentucky =

Unincorporated community in Kentucky, U.S.

- Unincorporated community
- Location within Kentucky
- Coordinates: 39°04′31″N 84°44′19″W
- Country: United States
- State: Kentucky
- County: Boone
- Elevation: 771 ft (235 m)
- Time zone: UTC-5 (Eastern (EST))
  - Summer (DST): UTC-4 (EDT)
- Area code: 859
- GNIS feature ID: 488375

Bullittsville is an unincorporated community in Boone County, Kentucky, United States.

A post office called Bullittsville was established in 1853, and remained in operation until 1918. The community has the name of Thomas Bullitt, a pioneer surveyor.
