= Old University of Chicago =

Former university in Chicago, Illinois, US

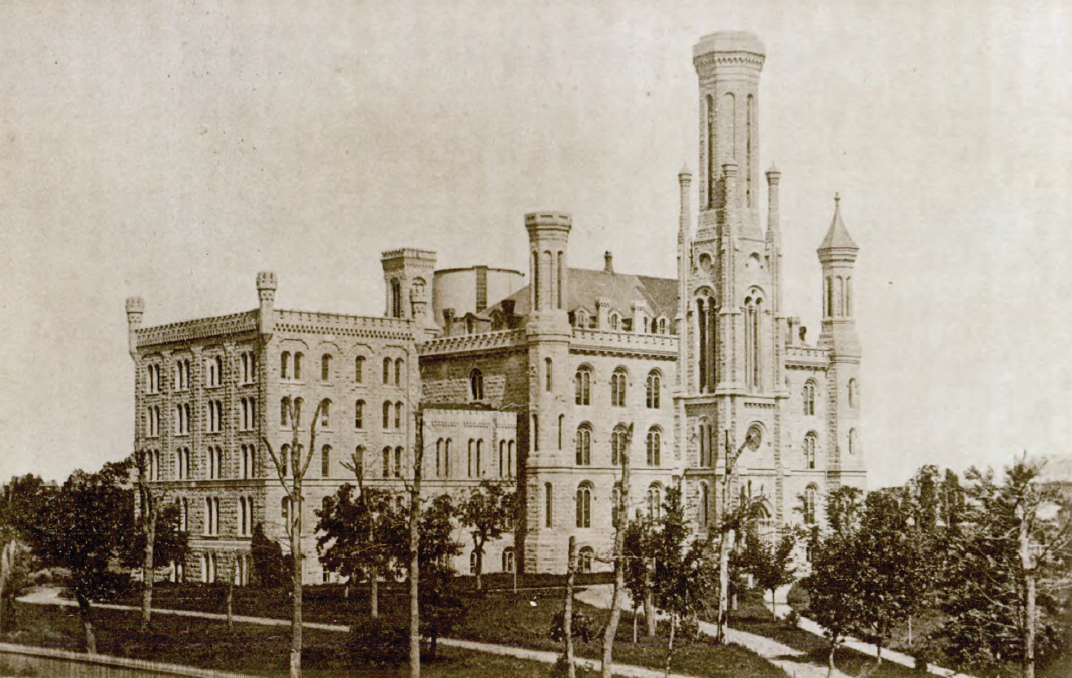
- The Old University of Chicago
- Type: Private
- Active: 1856–1886
- Religious affiliation: Baptist
- Academic affiliations: Union College of Law; Baptist Theological Union
- President: Galusha Anderson (last full president)
- Location: Chicago, Illinois, US; 41.8317°N 87.6114°W

The University of Chicago, renamed the Old University of Chicago in 1890, was a university which operated in Chicago, Illinois from 1856 to 1886.

The school, founded by Baptist church leaders, was called the "University of Chicago" (or, interchangeably, "Chicago University"). After years of financial struggle, the university's campus was badly damaged by fire, the school was foreclosed on by its creditors, its classes ceased in 1886, and it no longer admitted students. Rather than try to continue operations, its trustees decided in 1890 to change the school's name to the "Old University of Chicago" and allow the establishment of a new "University of Chicago".

The Northwestern University School of Law began as a department of the Old University of Chicago and transferred completely to Northwestern when Old UC folded. The Baptist Theological Union had formed as a separate theological school alongside the University in 1865, and would later be grafted into the new university as the University of Chicago Divinity School. While the present-day University of Chicago, which was established in 1891, is a separate legal entity and in a different location, it recognized Old University of Chicago alumni as its own and maintained a number of other continuities from its pre-1890 origins.

== History ==
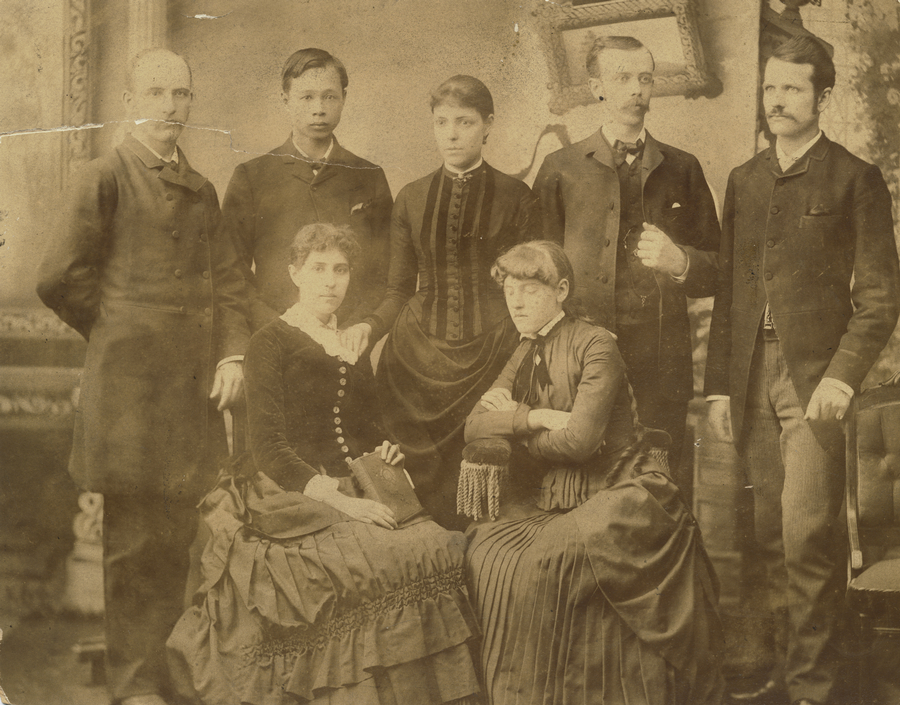
Students of the Old University of Chicago

Old University of Chicago Presidents
Name	Dates
John C. Burroughs	1859–1873
James R. Doolittle, acting	1874
Lemuel Moss	1874–1875
Alonzo Abernethy	1876–1878
Galusha Anderson	1878–1885
George C. Lorimer, interim	1885–1886

The land upon which the Old University of Chicago was established was originally part of a lakefront tract owned by Senator Stephen A. Douglas. Douglas had offered the 10-acre (4.0 ha) plot, worth $50,000 and located at Cottage Grove Avenue and Thirty-Fifth Street, to the Presbyterian Church for a seminary. When the church group failed to raise the $100,000 Douglas set as a precondition of his donation, he offered the site to a group of Baptists, who accepted. Douglas was not particularly religious but an avid promoter of Chicago; critics accused him of trying to boost the value of his adjoining lots.

The school's 1856 charter required that most of the members of the board of trustees be of the Baptist faith. The school made no such restrictions on either faculty or students. Despite the title of university, in the early years, the tenor of the instruction was primarily collegiate and vocational in nature. Two hundred to five hundred students enrolled annually in preparatory, collegiate, law, and medical schools.

The new institution began almost immediately to encounter financial difficulties. Fundraising was hurt by Douglas' support for the Kansas–Nebraska Act, which was regarded by many northern Baptists and other abolitionists as a betrayal, while the financial Panic of 1857 drained the finances of many of the principal investors, rendering most of their initial subscriptions worthless.

The trustees proceeded with plans to build the university, including construction projects that were beyond the school's means because of the volatility of the market. With the university's debt mounting rapidly, President John C. Burroughs and the trustees sold a second wave of subscriptions. Key to this effort was James Hutchinson Woodworth, a former Chicago mayor who was also president of the Treasury Bank of Chicago. Woodworth served as a university trustee from 1857 to 1869, as well as treasurer for some time.

Burroughs, who remained in office longer than any of his five successors, established in 1859 the university's Law Department, the city's first law school. In 1870, Ada Kepley and Richard A. Dawson received bachelor of law degrees, likely the first woman and first African American, respectively, to receive degrees from the institution. In 1872, the faculty voted to allow the awarding of degrees to women undergraduate students. Alice Robinson Boise Wood became the first woman to graduate from the university with a B.A. in Classics in 1872. In 1873, the Law School became jointly associated with Northwestern University, as the Union College of Law and when the Old University of Chicago folded, today's Northwestern University School of Law. Baptist ministers and lay leaders had gathered in 1856 to organize a university for collegiate and theological education, and Baptists again gathered in 1863 as a separate Baptist Theological Union when theological instruction had not been addressed in the university, forming the Baptist Theological Union Seminary, which existed from 1867 to 1877 alongside the university. In 1877 the seminary moved to Morgan Park, IL. In the 1890s, this seminary became the University of Chicago Divinity School.

The university's finances deteriorated rapidly after Woodworth died in 1869. It was rocked by the huge costs of the Great Chicago Fire of 1871, and the Panic of 1873 decreased donations. In 1874, a fire damaged the university's main physical plant.

Meanwhile, disagreements in the board of trustees flared up over fundraising, financial management, and faculty appointments, escalating into open conflict. Burroughs and his most vocal opponent, trustee W. W. Everts, left the board. To keep Burroughs affiliated with the university, the trustees created the post of chancellor and appointed him responsible for the school's financial affairs. But the new president and Chancellor Burroughs were quickly at odds. Other administrators were hired and departed in rapid succession; by 1886, six presidents had served the university.

The university's fifth president, Galusha Anderson, appealed to philanthropists John D. Rockefeller and Leland Stanford, but was unable to secure substantial donations. Union Mutual Life Insurance Company, the university's chief creditor, brought suit in 1881 to foreclose the mortgage on the university's property. Anderson argued to keep the school open, but in January 1885 the court found for Union Mutual. The university closed in autumn 1886, and the main building was razed in 1890.

At the final meeting of its board of trustees in 1890, the group officially changed the name of the institution to the Old University of Chicago. This was to enable a new Rockefeller-financed Baptist school, then being organized, to have a completely separate legal entity and take the title of the University of Chicago.

A stone from the old school's building in Bronzeville, which was destroyed by fire, was preserved on the present school's main quadrangle, where it was set into the wall of the arch between the Classics building and Wieboldt Hall. The stone was removed from the wall and archived by the university in July 2020 in response to concerns regarding the old Douglas Hall benefactor's association with slavery.

== Notable alumni ==
- Camillo C. C. Carr, US Army brigadier general, attended from 1859 to 1862, honorary M.A., 1873
- Richard A. Dawson, second African American to be admitted to the practice of law in Illinois, and Arkansas state senator.
- Charles Richmond Henderson, minister and sociologist, taught at Univ. of Chicago
- Thomas W. Hyde, Union general and founder of Bath Iron Works
- Ada Kepley, first woman to receive a law degree in the United States
- Robert Todd Lincoln, completed law degree here.
- Ferdinand Peck, real estate mogul
- J. Morris Rea, Iowa attorney and politician, served as state senator
- Benson Wood, U.S. congressman
- Lloyd Garrison Wheeler, first African American admitted to the bar in Illinois, and helped found Provident Hospital.
