= William C. Payne =

American politician

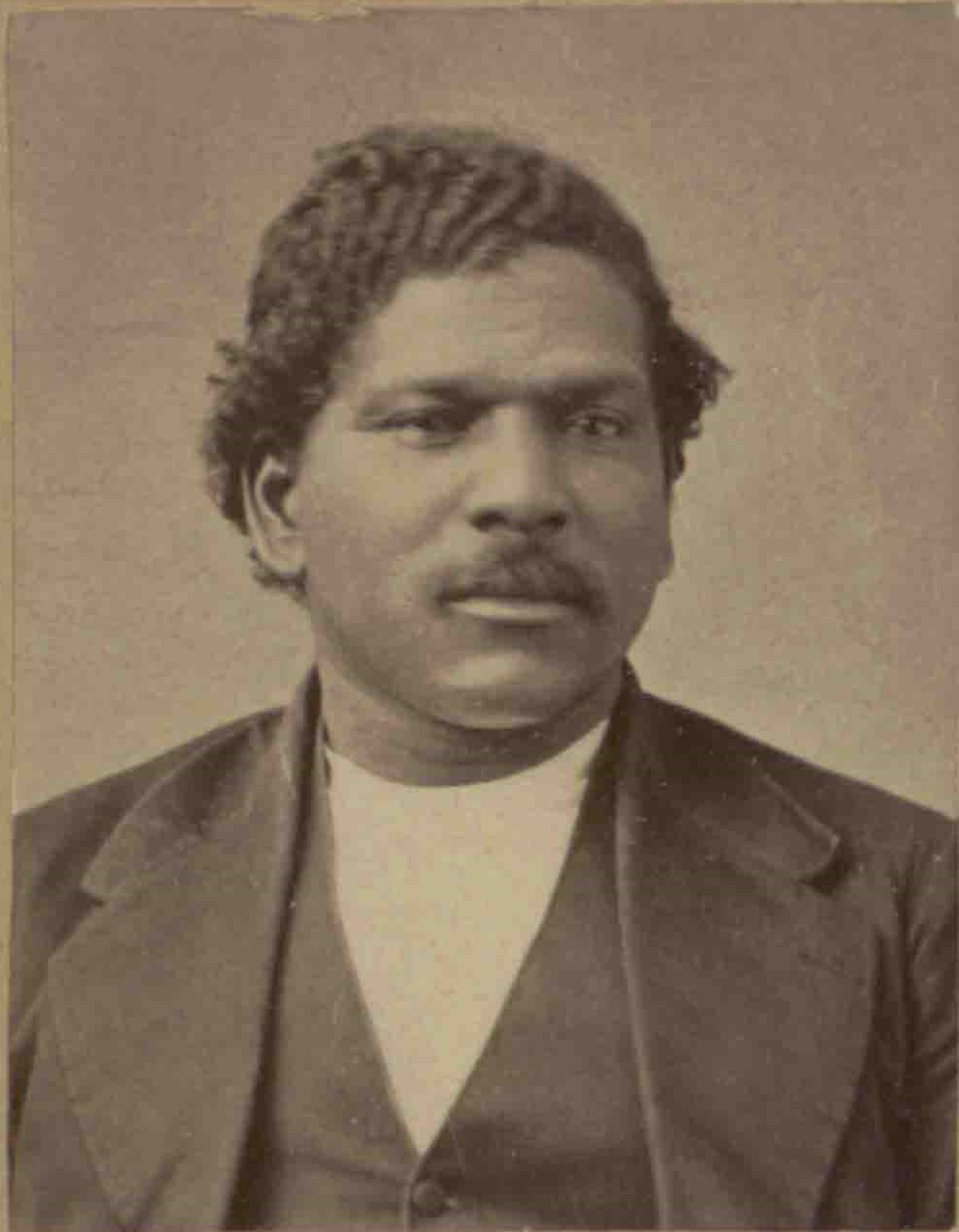
Payne circa 1881

William C. Payne (c. 1841 – November 3, 1898) was a state legislator in Arkansas. He represented Jefferson County, Arkansas, in 1879 and 1881.

He died November 3, 1898, in a police wagon after falling sick on 9th Street in Little Rock, Arkansas, and the police were called. He was picked up by a police patrol wagon but died before they reached the hospital around 1:30 in the morning; an inquest found the cause to be heart disease. At the time of his death he was living in Rob Roy where he was returned to be buried.

== See also ==
- African American officeholders from the end of the Civil War until before 1900
