= MSTR =

MSTR may refer to:

- Missouri University of Science and Technology Nuclear Reactor
- Massena Terminal Railroad
- Abbreviation form of the address 'Master'
- MicroStrategy, a US-based company
