= Gatley (surname) =

Gatley is a surname. Notable people with the surname include:

- Alfred Gatley (1816–1863), English sculptor
- George G. Gatley (1868—1931), United States Army officer
- Ian Gatley, former provost and vice president of New Jersey Institute of Technology, US
- Julia Gatley, architect, academic, architectural historian and author from New Zealand
- Lyle Gatley (born 1945), Canadian Olympic rower

== See also ==
- Gamley
