= Gary Thomas (academic) =

American academic

Gary Thomas (1938 – January 1, 2008) was the Chancellor of the University of Missouri–Rolla (now known as Missouri University of Science and Technology (S&T) from 2000 to 2005.

== Career ==
Thomas was the Provost and Senior Vice President for Academic Affairs of New Jersey Institute of Technology (NJIT) in Newark, New Jersey from 1990 to 1998 prior to his appointment at S&T. He was the Vice-President for Research and Graduate Studies from 1997 through 1998 and Vice-President for Academic Affairs from 1980 to 1990.

== Personal life ==
Thomas was raised in a rural community in northern California; his father was a sheep-shearer and farmer. He supported himself through college in a variety of jobs, including milking cows and driving a school bus. Although his parents were committed Mormons, Thomas considered himself an atheist. While at the University of California at Berkeley, Thomas was introduced to the political philosophy of socialism and considered himself a Trotskyist for the rest of his life. He taught in Ghana following his university studies for some years before returning to the United States to further pursue his academic career. A long-standing supporter of the arts, he supported the arts community in Newark NJ.

Thomas died New Year's Day 2008 after battling multiple myeloma. He is survived by his wife, Barbara Tedesco PhD, and four children: Katelin Thomas MPH, Ellie Thomas PT, Derek Thomas, and Jenna Tedesco PsyD; and four grandchildren: Gwyn Thomas Foley, Caleb Thomas Foley, Ahsaan Thomas Cauley, and Katelyn Elizabeth Tedesco-Musacchio.

Academic offices
Preceded by John T. Park, PhD	Chancellor of Missouri University of Science and Technology; 2000–2005	Succeeded by John F. Carney III, PhD
Preceded by Unknown	Provost of New Jersey Institute of Technology; 1990–1998	Succeeded by William C. Van Buskirk, PhD
