= John F. Carney =

American academic

John F. Carney III (1941-April 24, 2019) was chancellor of Missouri University of Science and Technology from 2005 to 2011.

Carney received his bachelor's degree in civil engineering from Merrimack College in 1963 and a master's in 1964. He received a Ph.D. civil engineering from Northwestern University in 1966. He taught at the University of Connecticut from 1966 to 1981 when he became head of the civil engineering department at Auburn University. He moved to Vanderbilt University in 1983 and was associate dean for graduate affairs (1989–1993) and then associate dean for research and graduate affairs (1993–1996). He was provost and vice president for academic affairs at Worcester Polytechnic Institute from 1996 to 2004 when he assumed the Missouri job.

His research specialty was impact mechanics particularly with railroads and he holds 10 patents.

Carney in 2007 was successful in persuading the University of Missouri Board of Curators unanimously to change the name of the University of Missouri-Rolla (in the same manner as other schools in the University of Missouri System) to Missouri University of Science and Technology. Carney had argued that the old name was not representative of the school's mission as an engineering school.

Academic offices
Preceded by Gary Thomas	Chancellor of Missouri University of Science and Technology; 2005 –2011	Succeeded by Warren K. Wray (interim)
