= Gamley =

Gamley is a surname. Notable people with the surname include:

- Douglas Gamley (1924–1998), Australian composer
- Henry Snell Gamley (1865–1928), Scottish sculptor

== See also ==
- Gamleys
- Gatley (surname)
