= Priscilla Nelson =

American academic administrator

Priscilla Nelson was the Provost and Senior Vice President for Academic Affairs of New Jersey Institute of Technology (NJIT) in Newark, New Jersey from May 2005 to November 2008. She is currently the Department Head and Professor, Department of Mining Engineering, Colorado School of Mines.

== Education ==
Nelson holds a bachelor's degree in Geological Science from the University of Rochester. She earned her master's degrees in Geology from Indiana University Bloomington and in Structural Engineering from the University of Oklahoma. She also has a PhD in Geotechnical Engineering from Cornell University (1983).

== Honors and awards ==
- Fellow of the American Association for the Advancement of Science
- Honorary Member of the American Society of Civil Engineers (ASCE)
- Eminent Engineer of Tau Beta Pi
- First president of the American Rock Mechanics Association
- Former president of the Geo-Institute of ASCE
- Former Chair of the Division of Engineering in AAAS.

Academic offices
Preceded by William C. Van Buskirk, PhD	Provost of New Jersey Institute of Technology; May 2005 – November 2008	Succeeded by Ian Gatley, PhD
