= William C. Van Buskirk =

William Charles Van Buskirk (born 11 March 1942) was the Provost and Senior Vice President for Academic Affairs of New Jersey Institute of Technology (NJIT) in Newark, New Jersey from Oct 1998 to June 2004, and he retired in December 2011 as a Distinguished Professor in the Department of Biomedical Engineering and was the Foundation Professor of Biomechanical Engineering at NJIT.

== Education ==
Born in Utah, Van Buskirk received his BS in 1964 from the United States Military Academy, an MS in 1966 and his PhD in 1970 in Aeronautical and Astronautical Engineering from Stanford University. His doctoral thesis was entitled Experimental and theoretical model studies of some dynamic response characteristics of the semicircular canals.

== Career ==
Van Buskirk served active duty in the United States Air Force from 1964 to 1967, retiring as a first lieutenant. Following his PhD, he started as an assistant professor of Mechanical Engineering at Tulane University in 1970. Van Buskirk developed the undergraduate program in Biomedical Engineering there and rose to head of department and endowed chair positions before becoming the Dean of the School of Engineering. He left Tulane University in 1998 to become the Provost and Senior Vice President for Academic Affairs at the New Jersey Institute of Technology.

During his almost six years term as the Provost at NJIT, he was involved with the creation of the Biomedical Engineering department, the movement of the Chemistry and Environmental Science faculty to the College of Science and Liberal Arts and the evolution of the Computer and Information Science department into the College of Computing Sciences. He stepped back to teaching and research roles as a Distinguished Professor in the Biomedical Engineering department in 2004.

== Honors and awards ==
- Dow Outstanding Young Faculty Award from American Society for Engineering Education (ASEE).
- Outstanding Biomedical Engineering Educator Award from ASEE.
- Fellow of the American Society of Mechanical Engineers.
- Fellow of the American Institute for Medical and Biological Engineering.
- Fellow of the Biomedical Engineering Society.

Academic offices
| Preceded by Gary Thomas | Provost of New Jersey Institute of Technology; Oct 1998 – June 2004 | Succeeded by Priscilla Nelson, PhD |
