= Missouri University of Science and Technology =

Public university in Rolla, Missouri, US

Coordinates: 37.955544°N 91.773513°W

- Former names: Missouri School of Mines and Metallurgy (1870–1964); University of Missouri at Rolla (1964–1968); University of Missouri–Rolla (1968–2008)
- Motto: Salus populi suprema lex esto (Latin)
- Motto in English: Let the welfare of the people be the supreme law
- Type: Public research university
- Established: 1870; 156 years ago
- Parent institution: University of Missouri System
- Accreditation: HLC
- Academic affiliations: ORAU; space-grant
- Endowment: $604,010,199 (2024)
- Chancellor: Mohammad Dehghani
- Provost: John Harris
- Faculty: 327 (full-time, fall 2021)
- Administrative staff: 742 (full-time, fall 2021)
- Students: 6,456 (2023)
- Undergraduates: 5,324 (2023)
- Postgraduates: 1,132 (2023)
- Location: Rolla, Missouri, United States
- Campus: Rural/College Town, 284 acres (1.15 km^{2})
- Newspaper: Missouri Miner
- Colors: Silver, gold and green
- Nickname: Miners
- Sporting affiliations: NCAA Division II – GLVC
- Mascot: Joe Miner
- Website: mst.edu
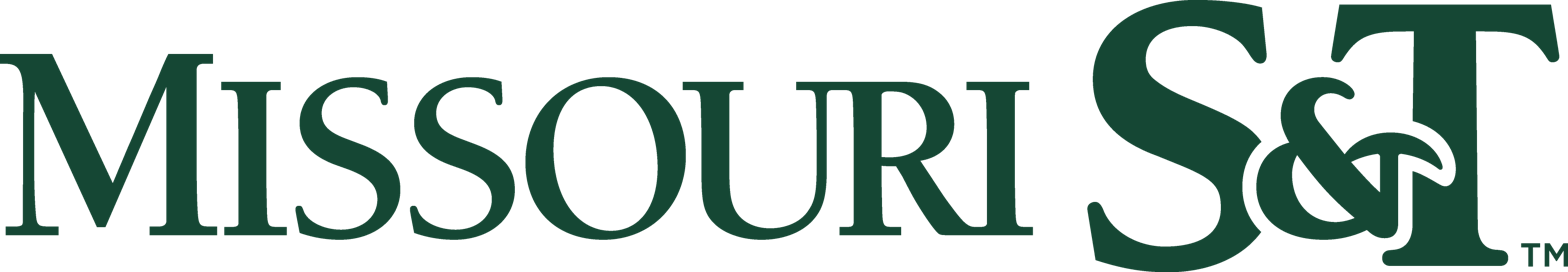

The Missouri University of Science and Technology (Missouri S&T or S&T) is a public research university in Rolla, Missouri, United States. It is a member institution of the University of Missouri System. Most of its 6,456 students (2023) study engineering, business, sciences, and mathematics. Known primarily for its engineering school, Missouri S&T offers degree programs in business and management systems, information science and technology, sciences, social sciences, humanities, and arts. It is classified as a "STEM-dominant", R1 university with "very high research spending and doctorate production".

== History ==
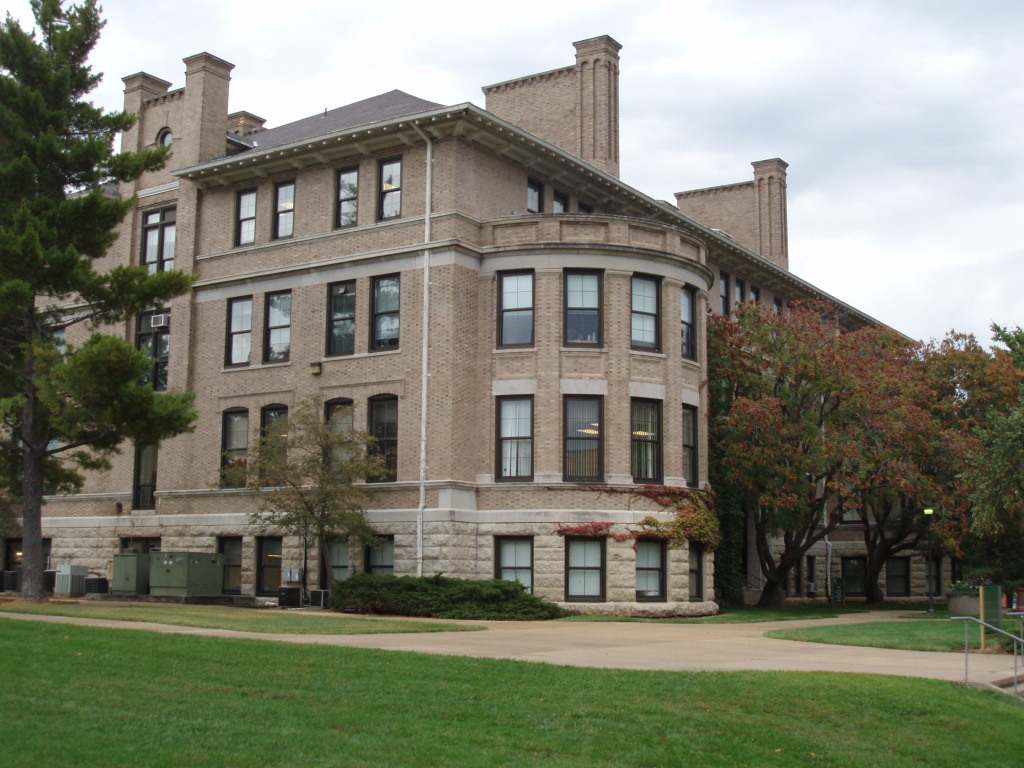
Norwood Hall, from the southwest

Engineering and agricultural education was a rarity in American higher education in 1860, but that changed dramatically in 1862, when the Morrill Land-Grant Acts passed Congress. The law gave generous deeds of public land to states that created schools with programs in engineering and scientific agriculture. Debates over the Civil War and reconstruction slowed progress in Missouri, but finally in 1870 the obvious importance of mining in the state, as well as agriculture, forced the legislature to create the Missouri School of Mines and Metallurgy in Rolla as part of the state system, and a new agricultural program at the University of Missouri in Columbia.

It became the first technological learning institution west of the Mississippi River. Early in its history, the School of Mines was focused primarily on mining and metallurgy. Rolla is located close to the Southeast Missouri Lead District which produces about 70% of the U.S.' primary supply of lead, as well as significant amounts of the nation's zinc.

The school was founded under the auspices of the University of Missouri in Columbia in order to take advantage of the Morrill Land-Grant Acts to "teach such branches of learning as are related to agriculture and the mechanic arts, in such manner as the legislatures of the States may respectively prescribe, in order to promote the liberal and practical education of the industrial classes in the several pursuits and professions in life." The act endowed Missouri a federal land grant of 30,000 acres for each of the state's two senators and nine representatives at the time—or 330,000 acres (133,546.26 ha; 515.62 sq mi). The endowment said that the land could not be sold for less than $1.25/acre and as such was a minimum endowment of $412,500 for Missouri. There was an intense debate in the state over the location and number of schools before it was finally decided to have one school in Columbia and a branch in the mining area of southeast Missouri.

Iron County (Ironton) and Phelps County (Rolla) made bids for the school, with Phelps County winning in 1870. Classes began on November 23, 1871, in a new building that the city of Rolla had just built. The college had an enrollment of 28 undergraduates and three graduates in 1874. The college bought what is now called the "Rolla Building" for $25,000 in January 1875. Following a $2 million renovation in 1995, that building is now used as the Mathematics and Statistics Department's library, chair's office, part of the main office, and other faculty offices.

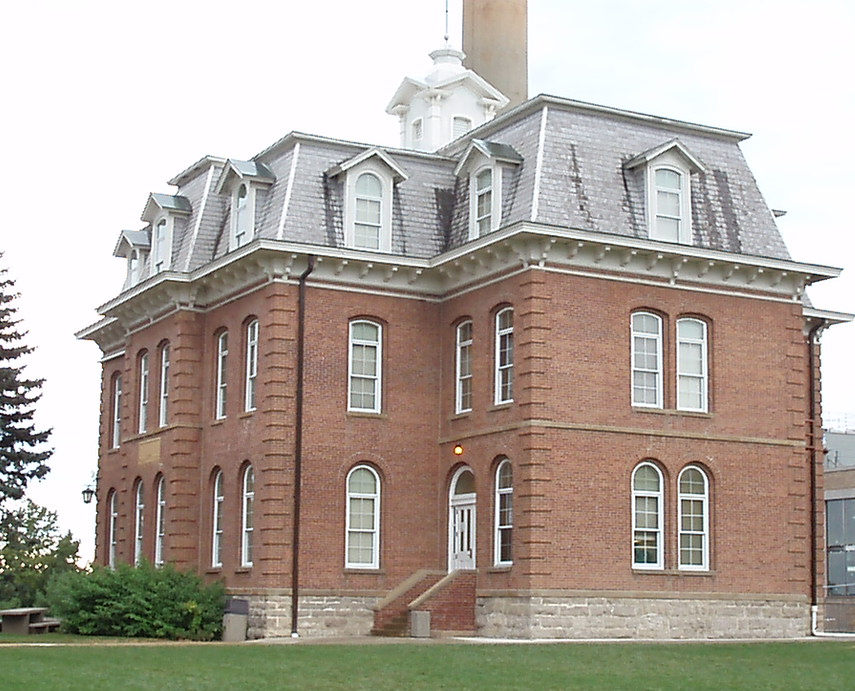
The Rolla Building, 2008

Initially, the school only offered degrees in civil engineering, metallurgy, and mining engineering. However, by the late 1920s, the school had added degrees in ceramic engineering, chemical engineering, electrical engineering, and mechanical engineering. The school became home to Missouri's first operational nuclear reactor in 1961.

In 2018, the school was approved by the state's Coordinating Board for Higher Education for designation as "highly selective" in its undergraduate admission criteria, joining only Truman State University among the state's public universities at that level. As such, first-time, full-time students seeking degrees are generally only admitted if they have a "percentile score" of 140 points or greater, a combination of their high school class and college testing (ACT or SAT) percentile ranks. Missouri Department of Higher Education guidelines state that schools in this category may admit up to ten percent of students with lower percentile scores, and will automatically admit those with an ACT (or equivalent SAT) score of 27 or better.

=== Chancellors ===
The naming structure for the head of the university has changed reflecting its changes through the years. The head currently reports to the University of Missouri System.

The chancellor lives on campus at the Chancellor's Residence. It was constructed in 1889 as the "Club House" dormitory, then converted to a room house before becoming the Missouri State Geological Survey headquarters and finally the residence for the then-director in 1905.

22 persons have led the Missouri University of Science and Technology, or its predecessors, since 1871. The current chancellor is Mohammad Dehghani who began his service in 2019.

=== Military service ===
Military service has long been a tradition at the college. Beginning with the American Civil War, students and faculty have served in all major American conflicts.

==== Civil War ====
Three individuals, James Abert, George D. Emerson, and Robert W. Douthat, served in the American Civil War and as faculty.

==== World War I ====
When the United States entered World War I in April, 1917, a total of 65 members of the university, students and faculty, entered into the service for First Officers Training Camp. Almost half of the enrolled student population was involved in The Great War in some capacity, as the total enrollment was 186, down from 301 students. In total, nine men from the university sacrificed their lives. Two men received the Distinguished Service Cross from General John J. Pershing. One man, H. F. Allison, is credited with the first shot fired in France from a member of the American Expeditionary Force.

==== Inter-war years ====
In 1920, the college started its Reserve Officer Training Corps. An integral part of university life, at least half of all students made ROTC a part of their curriculum from 1924 to 1940. Of the 931 students enrolled in 1940, 534 were also ROTC Cadets.

==== WWII ====
After the bombing of Pearl Harbor, students sought to immediately enlist. The 1941–42 administration, including Curtis Laws Wilson, instead encouraged the student body to finish their training as that would make them more useful to the military.

=== Changes in hierarchy and name ===
Until 1964, the school was considered an offsite department of MU's School of Agriculture and Mechanical Arts, reporting to the main campus in Columbia (although it began fielding sports teams in 1935 in the Mid-America Intercollegiate Athletics Association). As such, its presiding officer was originally called a director (1871–1941), then a dean (1941–1964). In 1963 the University of Missouri System was created with the additions of standalone campuses in Kansas City and St. Louis. A year later, MSM was upgraded to an autonomous standalone campus as the University of Missouri at Rolla and its presiding officer, like that of its sister schools, was granted the title of chancellor. The curriculum was expanded to include most of the science and engineering disciplines, as well as social sciences and liberal arts such as psychology and history. In 1968, the campus name was slightly altered to the University of Missouri–Rolla, thus conforming to the naming scheme of the other three campuses. Business and management programs were gradually added in the following years. On January 1, 2008, UMR became known as Missouri University of Science and Technology or Missouri S&T for short.

In making the case for changing the name, then Chancellor John F. Carney III noted that Rolla in 2007 was "one of the few technological research universities in the nation. A technological research university (polytechnic university or institute of technology) may be defined as one in which a majority of students are enrolled in engineering, the sciences, business or mathematics; the graduate and research programs in those fields are robust; and exceptional academic programs in the liberal arts, humanities and social sciences complement and provide context to the technological strengths of the institution."

He noted that more than 70 percent of its enrollment was in engineering and more than 90 percent was in engineering, business, science and math—significantly higher than engineering schools such as the Massachusetts Institute of Technology, Georgia Institute of Technology, and Rensselaer Polytechnic Institute. He noted "The university's name, however, does not reflect the distinctive nature of the campus. Often, UMR is viewed as a 'satellite' or 'branch' campus due to its name or as a 'feeder' campus for the University of Missouri-Columbia (commonly referred to as the University of Missouri). This branch-campus designation hinders many of our efforts to achieve national recognition and a strong reputation as a technological research university."

He noted, "Of the 1.1 million seniors in the nation who took the ACT in 2006, only 551 non-Missouri seniors – or .05 percent – sent their scores to UMR." He also noted that the school's acronym of UMR got it confused with the University of Minnesota Rochester.

Among the other names considered were: Missouri University of Science and Engineering, Missouri Technological University, and Missouri Science and Engineering University.

=== Historic $300 million gift ===
In October 2020, the university received the largest single gift to any university, public or private, in the state of Missouri. The $300 million gift from June and Fred Kummer established a new foundation to establish the Kummer Institute for Student Success, Research and Economic Development. The gift also will establish a new college of innovation and entrepreneurship at Missouri S&T, develop new areas for research, provide scholarships and fellowships for students, and bolster the Rolla region's economy.

== Campus ==
=== Altman Hall ===
Originally a dormitory building, Altman Hall now houses student and university organizations including the KMNR radio station, the Missouri Miner student newspaper, the Rollamo yearbook, and a ResLife residential life downtown campus office. The building is named after William Altman, an alumnus killed in World War II.

=== Bertelsmeyer Hall ===
Bertelsmeyer Hall is located at the intersection of 11th street and State Street. It was named after James E. Bertelsmeyer (BS ChemE 1966), who contributed $5 million towards its construction. The building was dedicated in 2014 and is the current home of the Chemical and Biochemical Engineering Department.

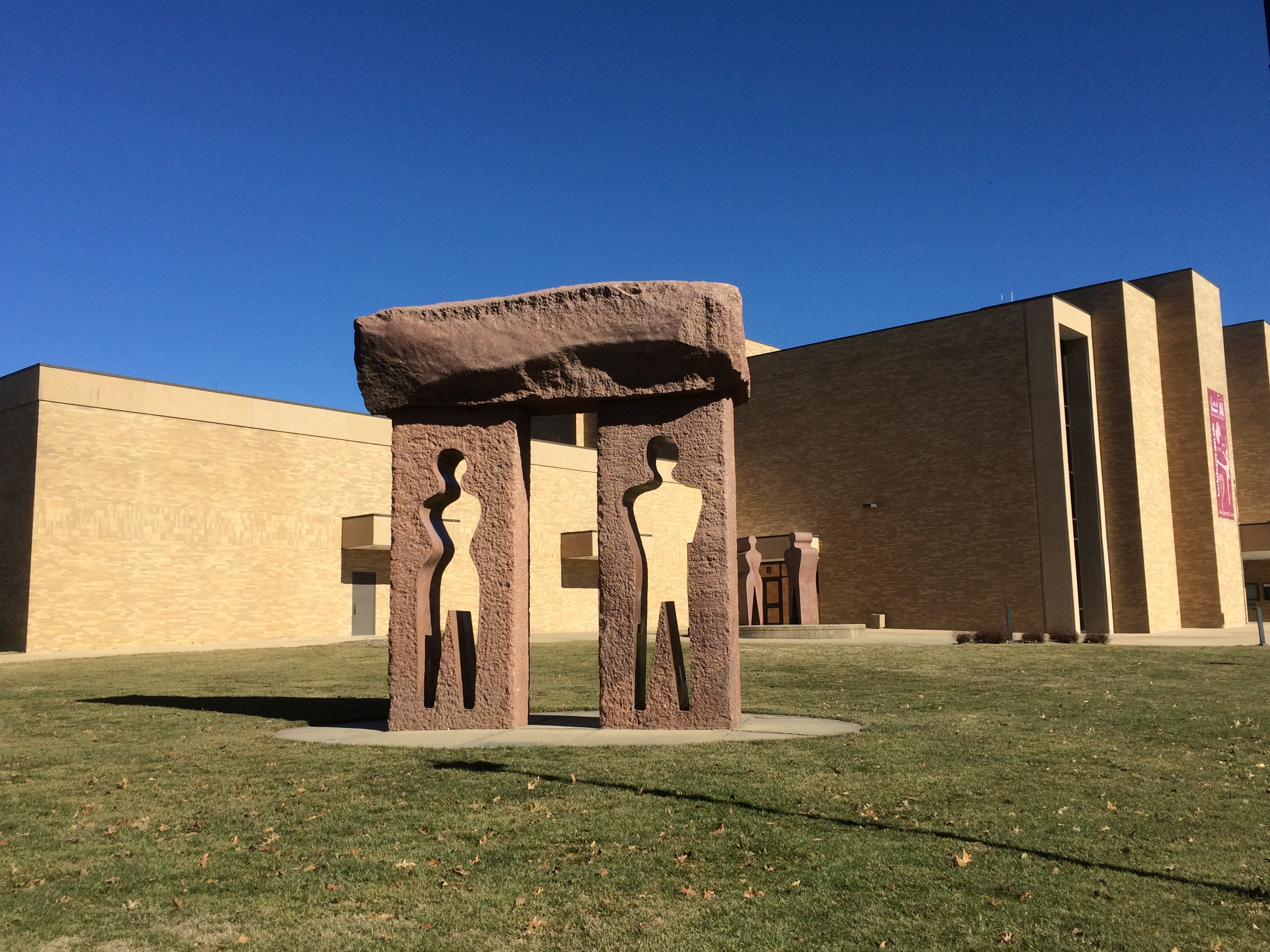
Millennium Arch, next to Castleman Hall

=== Castleman Hall ===
Castleman Hall, completed in 1991, is a 55,000-square-foot (5,100 m^{2}) home for the alumni and development offices, and the music and theater departments. Featuring a 660-seat performing arts center, the building occupies the city block between Main and State Streets, and Tenth and Eleventh Streets. The alumni and music offices had been in Harris Hall since the 1970s.

=== Curtis Laws Wilson Library ===
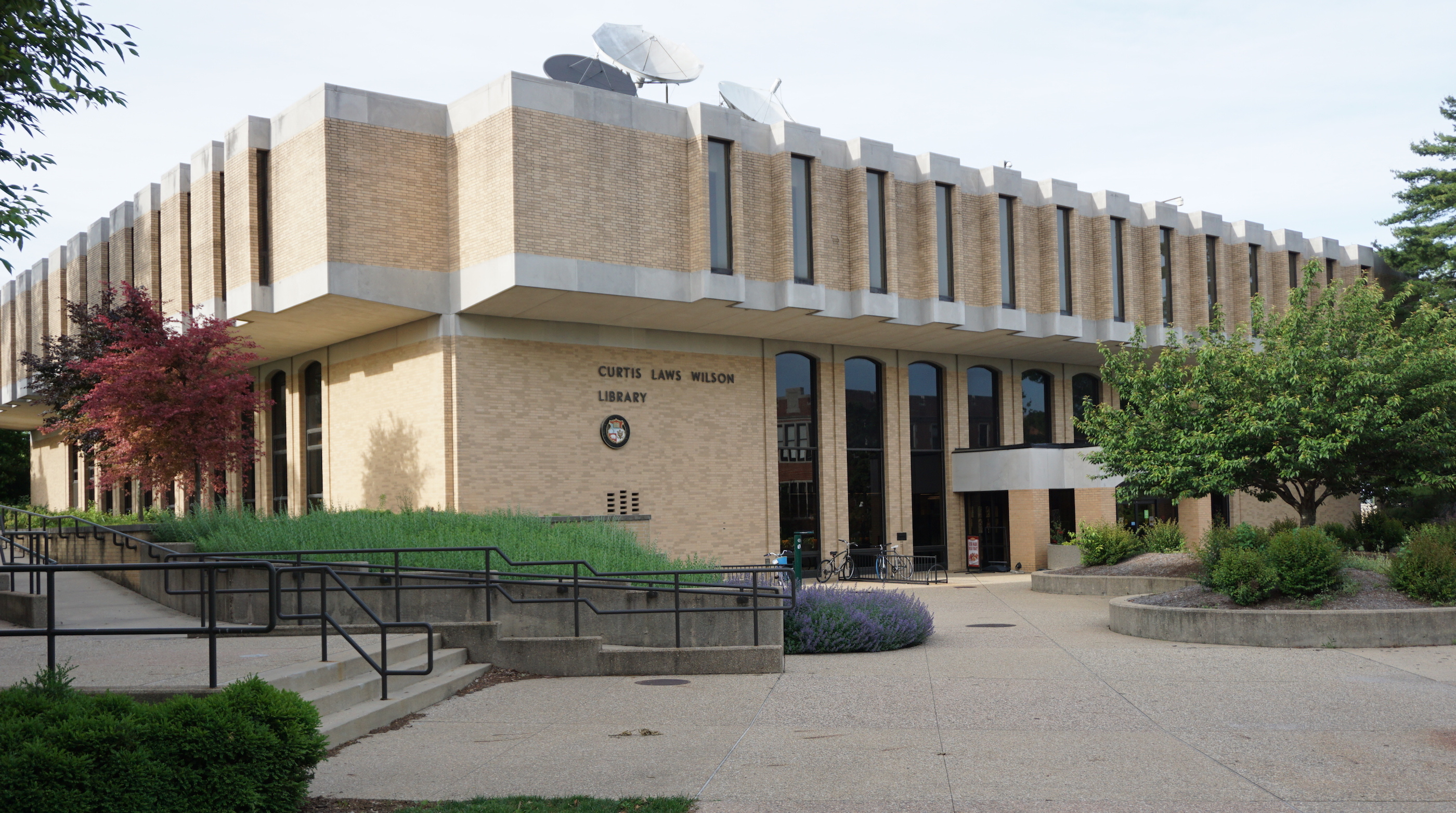
Curtis Laws Wilson Library

The Curtis Laws Wilson Library is the main academic library on campus. Wilson served as dean of the school from 1941 to 1963.

The basement of the library is home to several campus organizations, including:

- Video Communications Center, which provides video services to the university and produces distance education courses.
- State Historical Society of Missouri, Research Center – Rolla, which provides access to records and papers relating to area individuals, families, and organizations
- University Archives, which houses the historical, legal and cultural records of the university

=== Farrar Hall ===
Farrar Hall served for decades as a dormitory building and was used as quarantine housing during the COVID-19 pandemic. In June 2022, the marketing and communications office reported its relocation to Farrar Hall. In July 2023, the building became a temporary home for the graduate education office. Farrar Hall is named after university alumnus William Farrar who was killed in World War II.

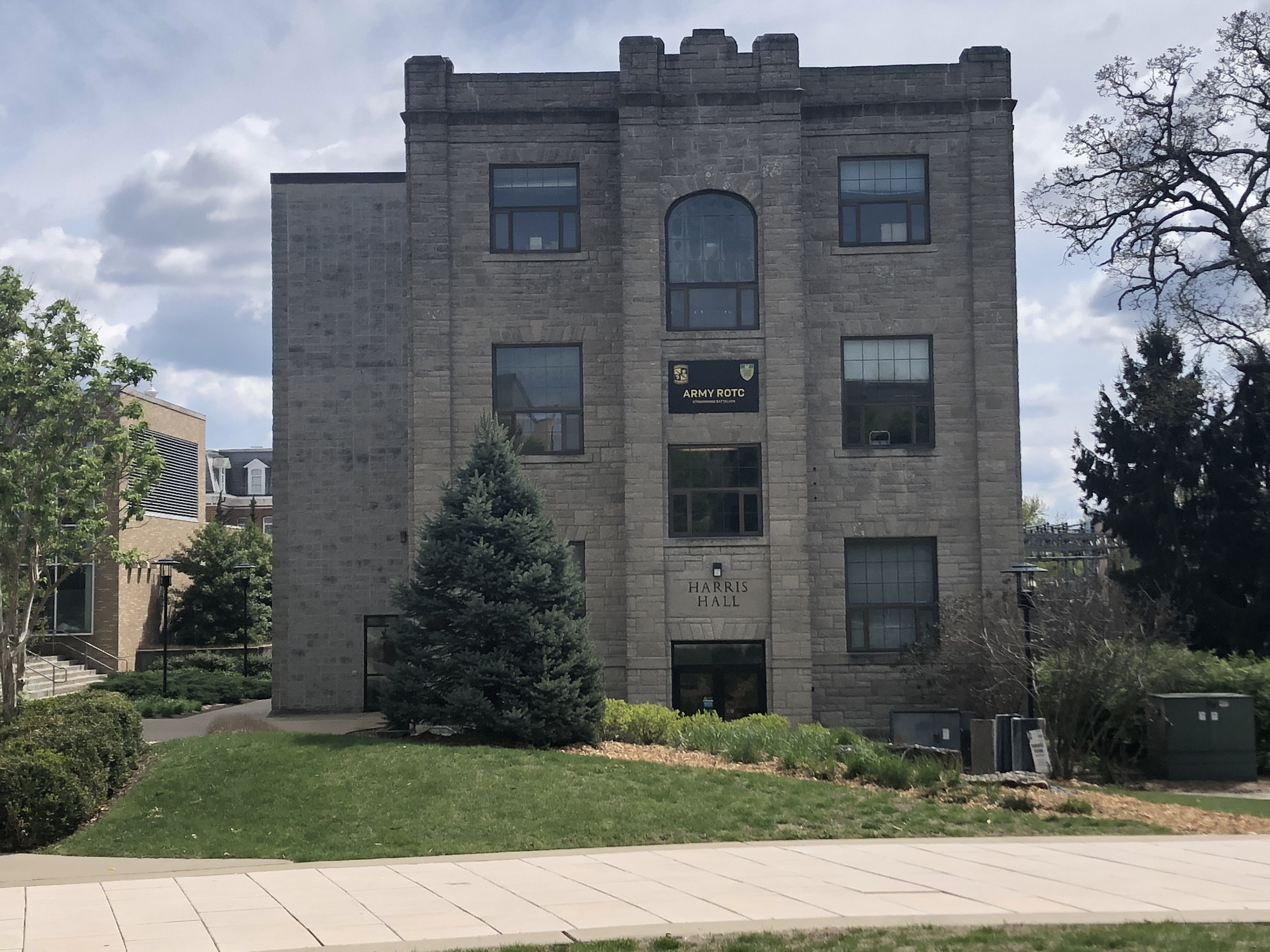
Harris Hall at S&T

=== Harris Hall ===
Harris Hall opened in 1940 after Director William Chedsey was able to secure $80,000 from the Works Progress Administration and $50,000 in state funding. Harris Hall housed the Civil degree program for nearly two decades. As of April 2021, parts of the building are used by the Army ROTC Stonehenge Battalion, and Air Force ROTC Detachment 442. The building is named after Elmo Golightly Harris, one of the university's first directors, and the first chair of the department of civil engineering. Harris also led the first class held in the building.

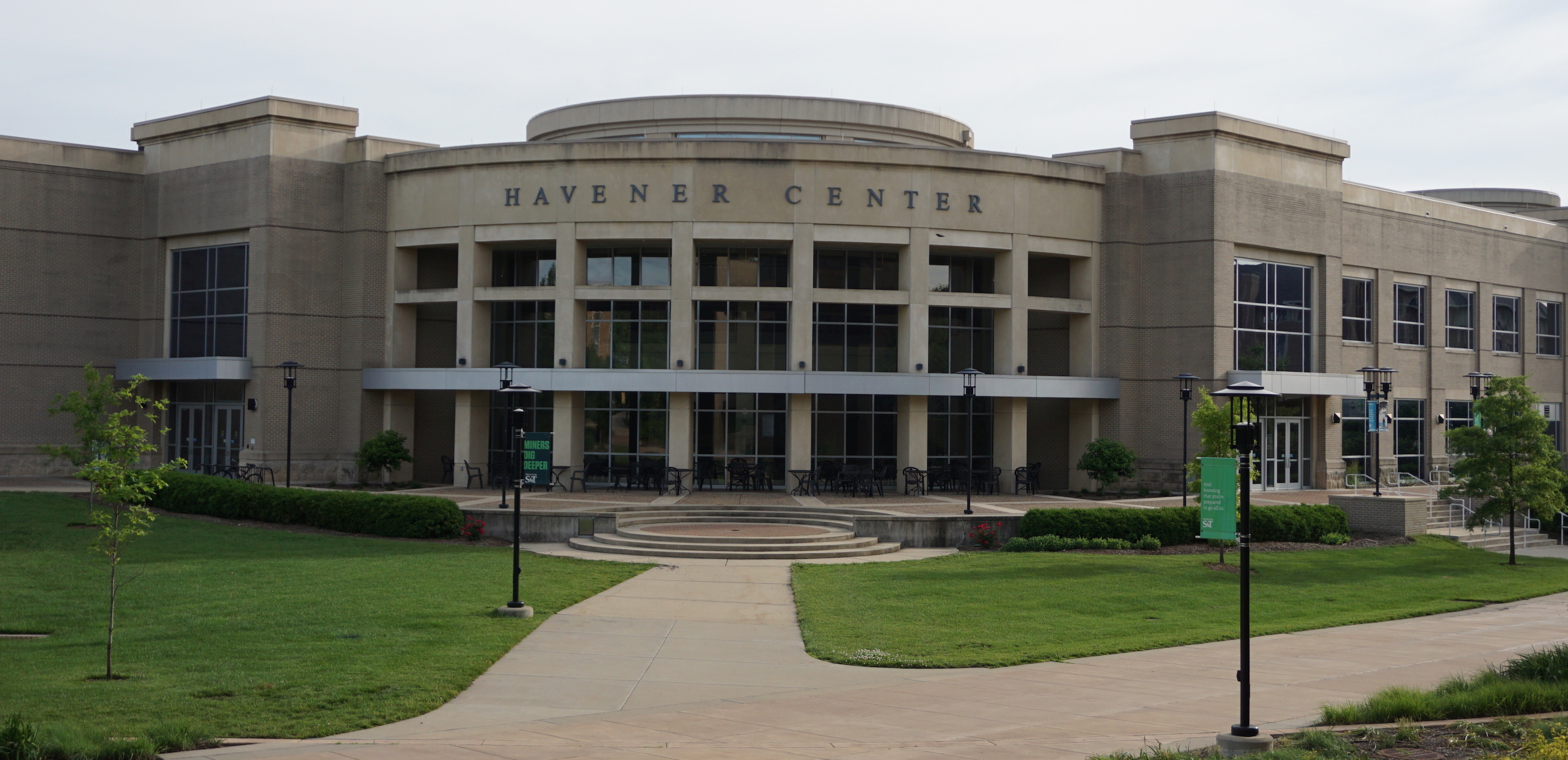
Havener Center at Missouri S&T

=== Innovation Lab ===
Opened in 2024, the Innovation Lab is a dynamic space designed to encourage creativity, collaboration and discovery among students. It includes a Makers Studio, the Student Success Center, an outdoor terrace, active learning classrooms, a spacious atrium, and spaces for students to meet, think and create.

=== Leach Theatre ===
Leach Theatre is located in Castleman Hall and has a maximum seating capacity of 650 audience members. The theatre was opened in 1991 and hosts approximately 100 events each academic year, including touring performances of groups such as the St. Louis Symphony Orchestra, the Russian National Ballet, Stomp, as well as off-Broadway shows such as Cats, Evita, and 42nd Street.

=== Millennium Arch ===
The university developed a new way to make deep cuts in granite and worked with artist Edwina Sandys who used the method to create the Millennium Arch sculpture. The Arch is a single trilithon with the stylized silhouettes of a man and a woman cut from the two uprights. The figures cut from the uprights stand nearby as freestanding statues. The work, which is located on 10th Street facing Castleman Hall, was developed as a project of the High Pressure Waterjet Laboratory of the Rock Mechanics & Explosive Research Center at Missouri S&T.

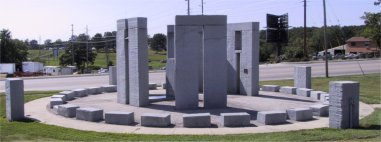
Missouri S&T Stonehenge, next to U.S. Highway 63 (Bishop Avenue)

=== Missouri S&T Stonehenge ===
Missouri S&T Stonehenge is a partial reconstruction of the original Stonehenge monument located on Salisbury Plain, in southern England. Missouri S&T's version of the ancient structure is located on the northwest corner of campus, and was dedicated on June 20, 1984, during the summer solstice. It features a 50-foot (15 m) diameter ring of 30 stones around a horseshoe of five trilithons through which various sightings of sunrise and sunset can be made. About 160 tons of granite were used to construct the monument. The rock was cut by Missouri S&T's water jet cutter equipment, which used two waterjets cutting at a pressure of 15,000 pounds of force per square inch (103 MPa), slicing across the surface just like a conventional saw. The cutter moved at a speed of about 10 feet per minute (50 mm/s) and cut between one-quarter and one-half inch (6 and 13 mm) on each pass.

After completion, Missouri S&T Stonehenge received an award from the National Society of Professional Engineers for being one of 1985's Ten Outstanding Engineering Achievements.

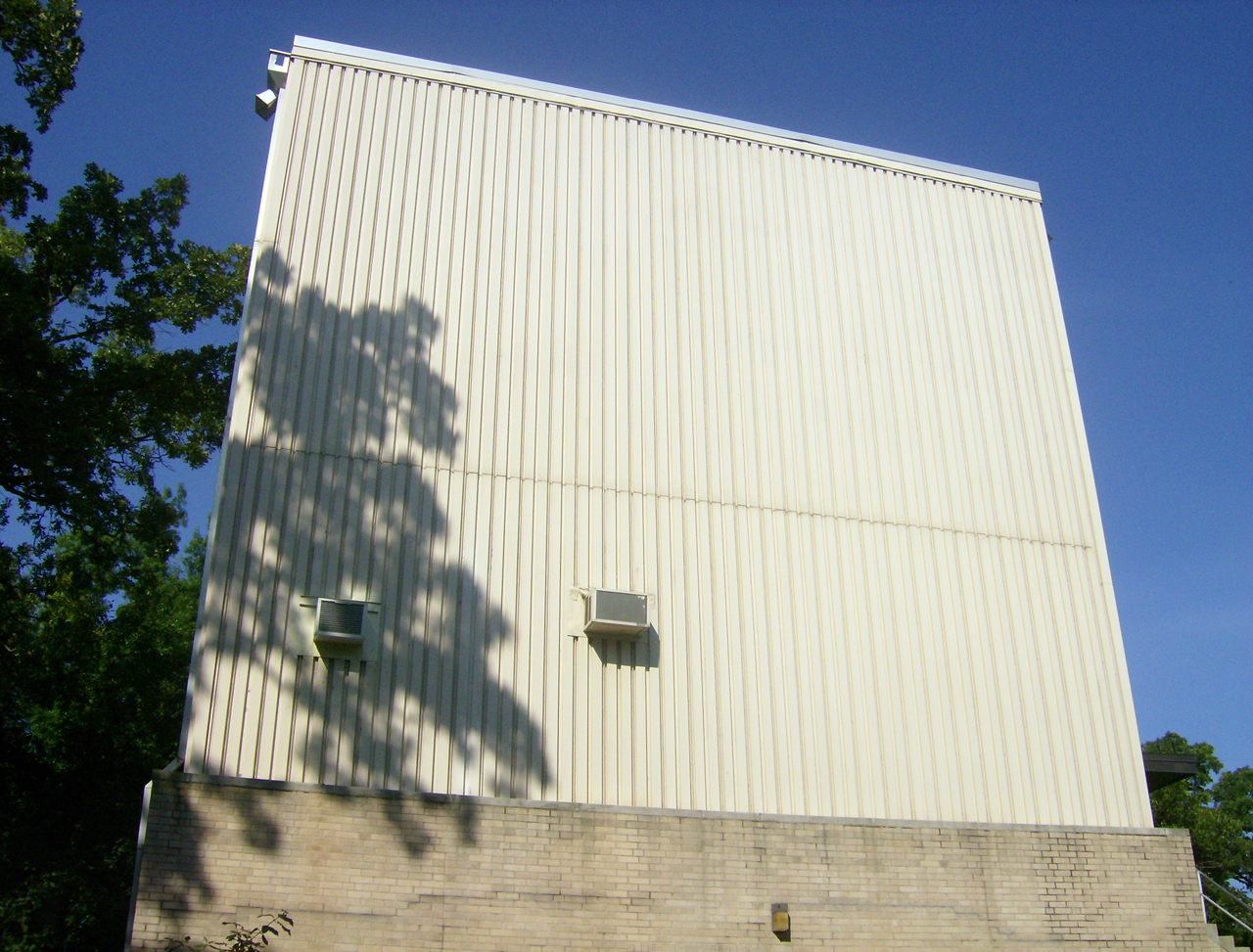
Missouri S&T nuclear reactor

=== Nuclear reactor ===
The school operates the 200 kW Missouri S&T nuclear reactor on-campus for educational, training, and research purposes. It became the first nuclear reactor to have become operational in Missouri, and first achieved criticality in 1961.

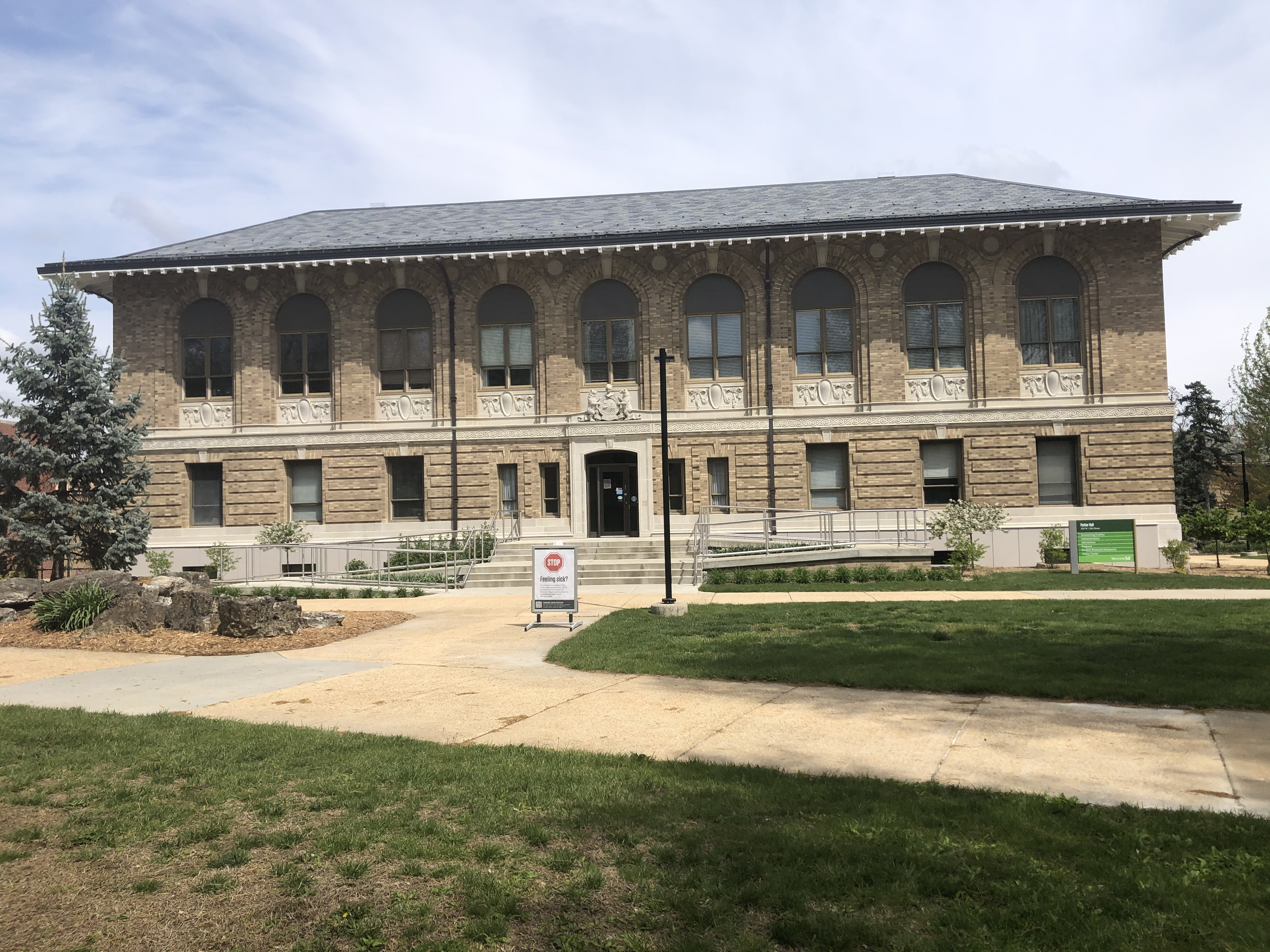
Parker Hall at Missouri S&T

=== Parker Hall ===
The construction of Parker Hall was completed in 1912. The building housed the campus library until the opening of the Curtis Laws Wilson Library. Parker Hall is one of three buildings (the Rolla Building and Norwood Hall being the other two) that are from the school's first 50 years. As of April 2021, Parker Hall holds the Visitor Center, Admissions Office, Registrar, Student Financial Assistance, Accounting and Cashier's Office, and administrative offices.

=== Jack Carney Puck and Plaza ===
The Jack Carney Puck and Plaza is a small, circular stage in the center of the campus. It is used for many student events, and is particularly active during St. Patrick's Day festivities. Reconstruction of the area around the Puck began in late 2020 to renovate the landmark in honor of former Chancellor John F. "Jack" Carney III.

=== Schrenk Hall ===
Built in 1938, Schrenk Hall is home to the Chemistry and Biological Sciences departments. The building's west wing was added in 1973. Walter T. Schrenk, after whom the building is named, was a chemistry professor from 1923 to 1961 and a former department chair.

=== Solar Village ===
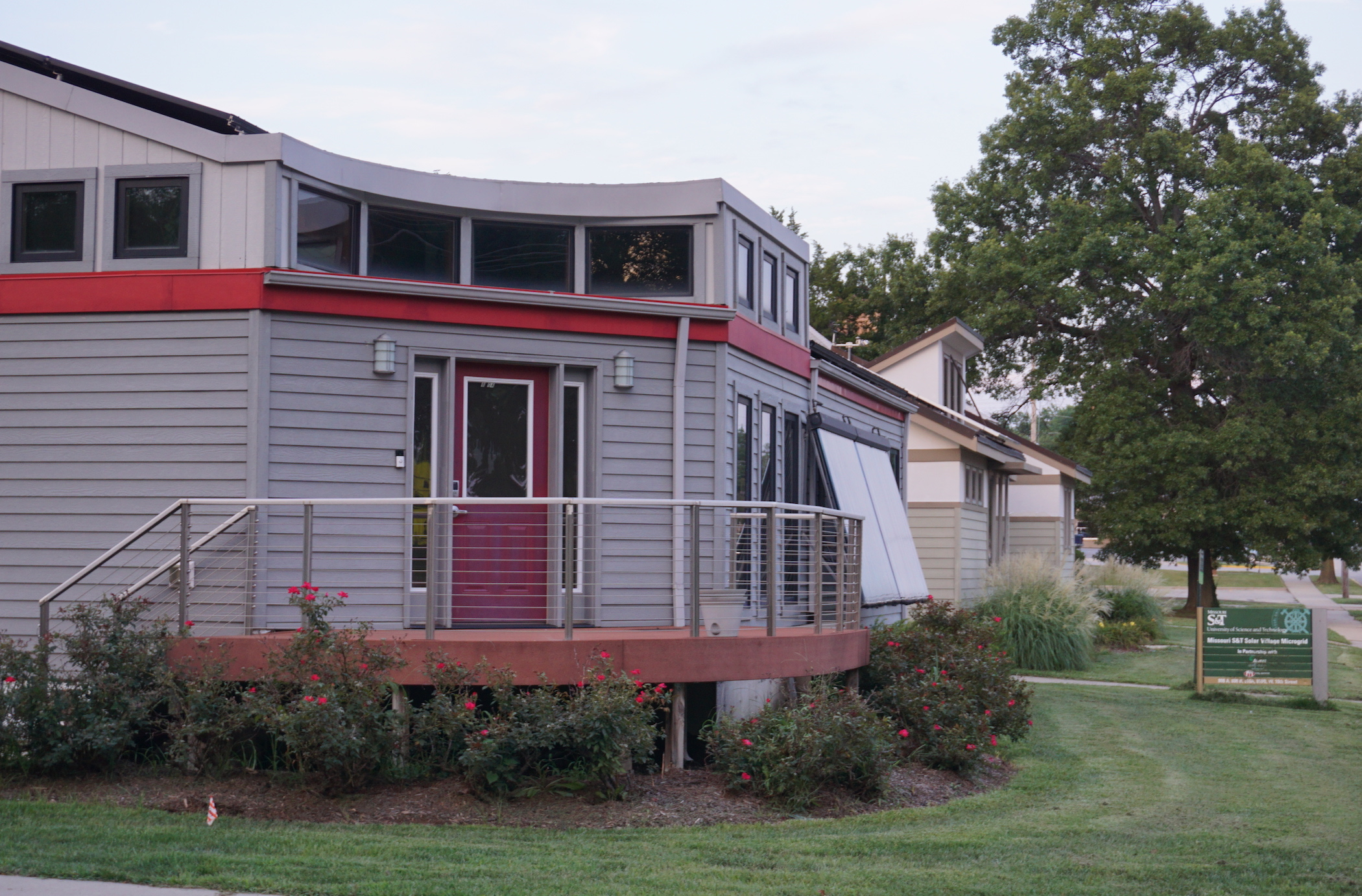
Solar Village on S&T Campus

Officially opened in December 2010, the Solar Village consists of four entries by Missouri S&T in the U.S. Department of Energy Solar Decathlon. Students, staff, faculty, and donors of Missouri S&T designed, constructed, and competed homes in each of the first four Decathlons including the Solar House in 2002, the Prairie House in 2005, the Solar House in 2007, and the Show-Me House in 2009. In 2012, the Solar Village was one of two highlights in a video short that won recognition from Second Nature and a Climate Leadership Award for the campus. In 2014, the Solar Village was expanded to include a microgrid system and an electric car charging station. In 2016, Missouri S&T announced a second, EcoVillage, composed of Decathlon entries including the 2013 Chameleon House and the 2015 Nest Home.

=== Straumanis-James Hall ===
Straumanis-James Hall houses the Missouri S&T Materials Research Center. The building, which honors Martin E. Straumanis and William "Bill" James, includes about 30,000 square feet of laboratory and office space. Research conducted here led directly to the founding of two successful companies, Brewer Science and Mo-Sci. Patents for research conducted in Straumanis-James Hall produce more than 90% of the campus revenue from licensing.

=== Kummer Student Design Center ===
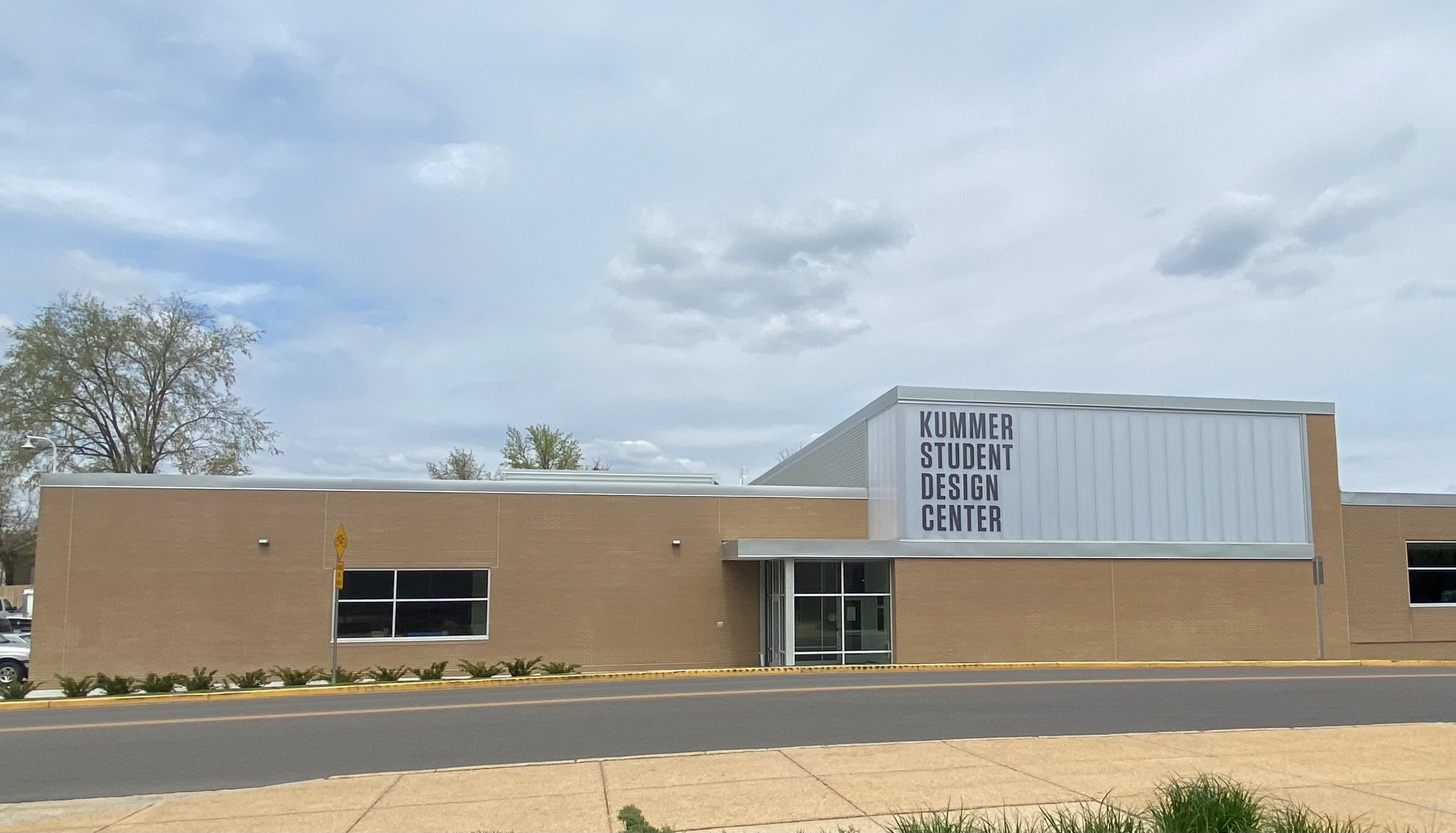
The Kummer Design Center from the south

The Kummer Design Center was dedicated on May 20, 2011. A privately funded $2.75 million project, it was named after Fred and June Kummer who donated $1.25 million. Fred Kummer is an alumnus of the university. The 23,000-square-foot (2,100 m^{2}) building was originally a Holsum Bread Bakery and afterward a Student Rec Center.

The Kummer Design Center is at 1051 N Bishop Avenue in Rolla, and is home to the Student Design and Experiential Learning Center (SDELC), which contains offices, a conference room, a machine shop, and labs, including a computer lab, and an iGEM lab. Approximately twelve hundred university students support twenty design teams at the SDELC, and have 24/7 access to the building. These students may then apply their design team experiences toward university-required experiential learning. The Kummer Design Center is also home to American Pie Company and Spoon Me (frozen yogurt) fast food restaurants.

In April 2019, a Mars Rover designed by S&T's Mars Rover Team broke ground on an expansion for the Kummer Design Center. The expansion, by Brinkmann Constructors, added 8,000 square feet (740 m^{2}) of new labs, manufacturing, and fabrication bays and expanded the waterjet, welding, and composites labs, doubling the size of the previous SDELC. The expansion's highest-level donors were Richard and Nancy Arnold, Brinkmann Constructors, Roger and Karen LaBoube, and Fred and June Kummer. The expansion was dedicated on September 11, 2020, to a virtual audience.

At the start of the COVID-19 pandemic, students and staff used the design center to make PPE for Phelps Health and other surrounding medical facilities. The design center used 3D printers to generate prototype face shield brackets and face masks, and some of the prototype files were released to the public for printing.

==== Design teams ====
- The Baja SAE design team designs, builds, and races an off-road vehicle each year. The team competes against other universities at international events.
- The Combat Robotics Design Team is one of the newest design teams, as it began in 2018, in the Student Design Center. The team designed and built its first robot, Ankle Grinder, in 2020 and will compete for the first time on March 20, 2021, at the Norwalk Havoc Competition in Norwalk, Connecticut.
- The Missouri S&T Chem E Car team designs and constructs small chemical-reaction-powered cars that are used in regional competitions. The designed car must be stopped by a timed chemical reaction and the goal of competitions is to see which car can be the most precise and stop at the given distance (15–30 m), solely using chemistry.
- The Missouri S&T Concrete Canoe team designs and constructs a concrete canoe and races it on a lake in regional and national competitions. The team has participated in concrete canoe competitions since the 1970s. The entire project, including fundraising and construction, is completed by the students. The team took third place in 2004.
- Missouri S&T's chapter of Engineers Without Borders has four ongoing international projects in Guatemala, Ecuador, and Bolivia. Over one hundred students are part of a team that works to develop sustainable solutions to engineering problems, such as lack of access to drinking water, in developing countries.
- Each year the Formula Electric team designs, builds, and races an electric formula-style race car. The team was founded in 2012 and started to compete in 2015. In 2017, the team finished overall 4th, the best they have ever done. For the 2017–2018 season, the team lost its title sponsor.
- The Missouri S&T Formula SAE team constructs a small formula-style race car every year, suitable for mass production and sale to weekend autocrossers. The team competes in Brooklyn, Michigan, against more than 100 other teams from universities around the world. The vehicle's cost, sales presentation, engineering design, acceleration, braking and racing performance all factor into its final score. The team has placed in the top ten in eight of the past twelve competitions, including first-, second- and fourth-place finishes.
- The Missouri S&T Human Powered Vehicle Team demonstrates its members' engineering excellence via a human-powered vehicle. The team promotes alternative energy technology while providing future engineers with hands-on experience in applying classroom knowledge. Through intercollegiate competition, this project hopes to foster leadership, teamwork, and the continuous advancement of technologies for the betterment of humanity. The team competes annually at the American Society of Mechanical Engineers Human Powered Vehicle Challenge in both west and east coast competitions. The team has placed among the top two overall in 14 of 16 competitions, and holds the female sprint record of 41.8 mph and male sprint record of 48.6 mph. In 2010, the team swept both the East and West Coast competitions and placed first in every event: Design, Male Drag Race, Female Drag Race and the Endurance Race, giving the team 1st Place Overall and National Speed Class Champions. In 2015, the team placed second overall in the ASME West Competition and first overall in the ASME East Competition, in the speed class.
- The S&T Mars Rover design team finished in first place at the 2017 international University Rover Challenge competition held June 1–3, 2017, in Hanksville, Utah. Missouri S&T's Mars Rover, named Gryphon, was designed and built by the students. The team developed custom circuitry for the rover, machined the aluminum and carbon-fiber support structure, developed durable wheels for terrain mobility, and 3D-printed gears used in the rover.
- Every year the Miner Aviation team designs, builds, and flies a remote-controlled plane for the American Institute of Aeronautics and Astronautics Design/Build/Fly competition (AIAA DBF). The team was founded in 1999 and first competed in the 2000–2001 competition year. The team was originally named the Advanced Aero Vehicle Group and later changed their name to the Miner Aviation Student Design team during the 2016–2017 competition year. In their first year, they finished 2nd place overall in the Open Class. In the 2002–2003 competition year they finished 1st place overall in the Open Class. They started to compete in the Advanced Class in the 2009–2010 competition year.
- Every two years the Motorcycle Design Team designs, builds, and races a motorbike, competing against universities across the world at the Motorland Aragon racetrack in Alcaniz, Spain.
- Every year the Multirotor Design Team competes in the International Aerial Robotics Competition (IARC). Competitions repeat each year until a team completes the competition. The team designs, builds, and programs drones. The team has also partnered with the Rocket Design team to compete in the Argonia Cup.
- Founded in 2015, the Nuclear Science Design Team is the only one of its kind in the United States, and thus doesn't have a standardized competition schedule. Instead of competing against other schools, the team conducts research and experimentation alongside the Nuclear Engineering and Radiological Sciences department and the Missouri S&T Research Reactor, writes scientific papers based on their findings, and presents those papers at the annual American Nuclear Society Student Conference. Since 2020, S&T's ANS student section has been awarded the Samuel J. Glasstone award 3 times.
- The Rocket Design Team used to compete in the Spaceport America Cup which is designed around the Intercollegiate Rocket Engineering Competition (IREC). The team designed and built a rocket each year for the competition. The team first started competing in 2015. 2019 was the first year they made two rockets. Since 2023, rather than compete in the Spaceport America Cup, the team has pursued their stated goal of launching a rocket to space. Since 2019, the team has had a liquid rocket project, focused on producing liquid engines. They successfully hot fired their Typhon engine in 2022, and launched their first liquid rocket, Phounix, in 2025, becoming the 20th collegiate rocket team in the world to do so.
- The Missouri S&T Satellite Project (M-SAT) team began as an Aerospace engineering course (AE301 Spacecraft Design) when NASA held a contest for a two-year development and build project (Nanosat program) that had to accomplish its goals in the harsh environment of space. After taking third place in Nanosat-4, the team continued perfecting its twin satellites for spaceflight and entry into the Nanosat-6 competition. During this cycle, the team was awarded "Best Outreach" for its work at encouraging an interest by local school students in STEM-related fields. The team placed second during Nanosat-7, beating rival MIT. With their legacy twin-satellite design and feedback from the AFRL sponsors, the team went on to win Nanosat-8 in 2015.
- Missouri S&T's Solar Car team has met with much success. Every two years, the team constructs a single-passenger car, its top covered with solar cells, that runs exclusively on solar power. The car houses lithium ion batteries, which are much lighter than conventional lead-acid batteries. Every time the car is rebuilt, changes make it lighter and more efficient. The team regularly enters solar car races in the United States and occasionally enters international races. The car claimed first place in Sunrayce '99, first place in the 2000 Formula Sun Grand Prix, fourth place in the Australian World Solar Challenge in 2001, second place in the 2001 American Solar Challenge, and first place in the 2003 American Solar Challenge. In 2016, the team placed fourth in the American Solar Challenge after not participating for six years.
- The Missouri S&T Solar House Team, designs and builds a house that is completely sustained by energy collected directly from the sun. After the house is built on campus, it is disassembled and transported to Washington, D.C. for the Solar Decathlon, a month-long competition. The Solar House Team placed 11th overall in both 2007 and 2009 out of a total of 20 teams. The team is one of only three teams to compete in four decathlons, and one of two teams to compete in four consecutive decathlons. The 2011 Decathlon is the first in which Missouri S&T did not participate, but the Solar House Team was back in the 2013 Decathlon in Irvine, California. The team took first place in the Energy Balance category at the 2005 competition. At the 2002 competition the team took first place in Refrigeration, second place in Energy Balance and third in Hot Water. In 2002 and 2005, the Missouri S&T team took 9th place out of 14 teams and 7th place out of 18 teams respectively. After competition, the homes are returned to the Solar Village on the S&T campus where they are rented as student housing.
- The Steel Bridge Design Team has competed since 2002. The AISC Student Steel Bridge Competition Committee releases new rules at the beginning of each school year. Participating teams are required to design and build a 1:10 scale steel bridge every year. Due to COVID-19, the competition was canceled in 2020. The team has advanced to nationals in 2003, 2004, 2008, 2013, 2014, 2016, 2018, 2019, and 2021–2025. Its best finish thus far was 5th in 2025.
- The Underwater Robotics Team designs, builds, programs, and tests robots that are meant to operate underwater. They compete in the Marine Advanced Technology Education remotely operated vehicles (MATE ROV) competition.

=== Former buildings ===
- The Jackling Gymnasium opened in 1915 and was named after Daniel C. Jackling, a successful alumnus who previously gave $1500 to improve the athletic field that was also later named after him. The Jackling Gym was a two-story building; the first floor had a 20-by-60-foot (6.1 by 18.3 m) swimming pool and lockers, while the second floor had a 70-by-90-foot (21 by 27 m) gymnasium. A gallery above the gym had seats to watch basketball games and a running track. After the end of World War II, the gym also housed about two dozen student-athletes in rooms around the pool and basketball court. These students became known as the "Jackling Jocks" and were housed in the building over a period of 15 years. In August 1965, the gymnasium was to be destroyed due to safety concerns. The Jackling Gymnasium was the first building on campus to be demolished. The Curtis Laws Wilson Library was built on the Jackling Gymnasium's former site. The Gale Bulman Building was built in 1969 as a replacement for the Jackling Gymnasium.
- Built in 1885, the Old Chemistry Building was the second building on campus after the Rolla Building. The Old Chemistry Building burned to the ground in 1969.
- The Quadrangle dormitory buildings were built with a $500,000 allotment from a Missouri bond issue approved in the mid-1950s. The original four buildings and an accompanying cafeteria were named after university alumni who were killed in World War II, as was a fifth building added in the mid-1960s. As newer student housing was built, use of the Quadrangle was phased out. All but two of the buildings – now used by university offices and student organizations – were razed and replaced with a parking lot in the late 2010s.

== Off-campus ==
=== Electromagnetic Compatibility Laboratory ===
The Electromagnetic Compatibility (EMC) Laboratory supports related research.

=== Experimental mine ===
This limestone mine is located near the main campus and is used for the teaching and research activities of the Department of Mining Engineering. The facilities, which cover 25 acres (0.10 km^{2}), include the mine and adjacent surface dolomite quarries. The mine supports student competition teams, such as the mine rescue team, and the annual "Haunted Mine" Halloween event. The mine has been used by the school since 1921.

== Academics ==
Academic rankings

National
- Forbes: 196
- U.S. News & World Report: 185 (tie)
- Washington Monthly: 145
- WSJ/College Pulse: 69

Global
- ARWU: Unranked
- QS: =628
- THE: 401–500
- U.S. News & World Report: 832 (tie)

=== Rankings ===
Recent school rankings include:

- Missouri S&T was ranked No. 5 in the country for "best colleges for engineering majors" by Money (2022).
- Missouri S&T was ranked No. 4 among public universities for "return on investment, career opportunities, and internship opportunities for students" by The Princeton Review (2021).
- Missouri S&T was ranked No. 1 for Missouri's best value college by SmartAsset "with an average starting salary for new graduates of $67,300. Tuition at the University is $9,246 and students receive an average of $8,274 in scholarships and grants." (2020)
- Missouri S&T was ranked No. 42 in the United States for "40-year return on investment, or net present value (NPV) with an average return of $1,548,000 for a bachelor's degree recipient" by the Center on Education and the Workforce (2019).
- Missouri S&T was ranked No. 25 in the "top 25 STEM-centric schools" by Forbes (2018).
- Missouri S&T was ranked No. 3 in the "top 10 places to get an engineering degree in the U.S." by USA Today (2016).
- Business Insider ranked Missouri S&T No. 5 among the "most underrated colleges in America" (2015).

=== Organization ===
The university is divided into three colleges, each of which contains multiple departments.

The College of Arts, Sciences, and Education (CASE) has 11 departments:

- Air Force ROTC
- Arts, Languages, and Philosophy
- Biological Sciences
- Chemistry
- English and Technical Communication
- History and Political Science
- Mathematics and Statistics
- Military Science (Army ROTC)
- Physics
- Psychological Science
- Teacher Education and Certification

The College of Computing and Engineering (CEC) has 9 departments:

- Chemical and Biochemical Engineering
- Civil, Architectural, and Environmental Engineering
- Computer Science
- Electrical and Computer Engineering
- Geosciences, Geological, and Petroleum Engineering
- Materials Science and Engineering
- Mechanical and Aerospace Engineering
- Mining and Explosives Engineering
- Nuclear Engineering and Radiation Science

The Kummer College of Innovation, Entrepreneurship and Economic Development (Kummer College) has 3 departments:

- Business and Information Systems
- Economics
- Engineering Management and Systems Engineering

=== Student engineering projects ===
The Student Design & Experiential Learning Center (SDELC) was established in 2000 to better support the various multi-disciplinary student design teams. In 2004, the center's mission expanded to provide experiential learning in academic courses, identify and support student service learning projects within the curriculum, and support ad hoc student teams in specialty academic events involving multi-disciplinary student research.

By 2006, the SDELC had expanded to ten student design teams. The center's expanded mission involved better funding and offering support and resources to multi-disciplinary project teams that had a research base to their activities. The SDELC provided academic credit opportunities in the form of three, one-hour classes on design, leadership and communication. The center also offers a half-credit course on experiential design through the Residential College (RC) program which has a per-semester enrollment of over 100 students engaged in hands-on learning projects. The SDELC's student design teams, research teams and projects, and academic courses are the foundation of experiential learning at Missouri S&T.

== Athletics ==
The Missouri S&T athletic teams are named the Miners and Lady Miners. The university is a member of the Division II level of the National Collegiate Athletic Association (NCAA), primarily competing in the Great Lakes Valley Conference (GLVC) for most of its sports since the 2005–06 academic year, while its men's swimming team competes in the New South Intercollegiate Swim Conference (NSISC). The Miners and Lady Miners previously competed in the Mid-America Intercollegiate Athletics Association (MIAA) from 1935–36 to 2004–05; and in the Missouri College Athletic Union (MCAU) of the National Association of Intercollegiate Athletics (NAIA) from 1924–25 to 1932–33.

Missouri S&T competes in 17 intercollegiate varsity sports (10 for men, 7 for women): Men's sports include baseball, basketball, cross country, football, golf, soccer, swimming, track & field (indoor and outdoor) (Note: The NCAA classifies indoor and outdoor track & field, both sponsored by S&T for both men and women, as two separate sports. Indoor championships are held in the NCAA's winter season and outdoor championships in the spring season.) and volleyball; women's sports include basketball, cross country, soccer, softball, track & field (indoor and outdoor), volleyball and spirit squad. Former sports included women's golf. As of July 2022, men's volleyball became the 17th varsity sport in the 2023 spring season (2022–23 school year).

=== History ===
The team name comes from the university's history as a mining school. Intercollegiate competition began with a baseball game in 1892, with the first football game in the following year.

=== Club and intramural sports ===
Club sports associated with Missouri S&T include ultimate frisbee, lacrosse, rugby union, roller hockey, trap and skeet, tennis, baseball, and water polo.

Intramural sports have a large following at the Missouri S&T. With over 60 men's teams and over 10 women's teams, sports are arranged into divisions. 30 different sports are contested each year: golf, softball, swimming, ultimate, flag football, billiards, badminton, volleyball, racquetball, bowling, basketball, table tennis, tennis, track, weightlifting, and soccer.

== Student life ==
Undergraduate demographics as of Fall 2023
Race and ethnicity	Total
White	75%
Hispanic	6%
Unknown	6%
Asian	4%
Black	3%
International student	3%
Two or more races	3%
Economic diversity
Low-income (Note: The percentage of students who received an income-based federal Pell grant intended for low-income students.)	21%
Affluent (Note: The percentage of students who are a part of the American middle class at the bare minimum.)	79%

The Missouri S&T event calendar includes current campus events.

There are over 200 student organizations at Missouri S&T, including student government, professional societies, community service organizations, and religious and cultural groups.

=== Student media ===
The student-run newspaper at Missouri S&T, The Missouri Miner, is published every Thursday during the school year and can be read online, with ongoing digitization of each issue since the first in 1915. In February 2007, the paper threatened to sue the school because the university cut funding. After a one-school-year break for many reasons including a funding cut, The Missouri Miner continued publication in the fall semester of 2009.

Production of the university's RollaMo yearbook is handled by undergraduate students. Amateur radio station, WØEEE, founded in 1923 and run by the Amateur Radio Club, was the first campus club at MSM and is one of the oldest student/college amateur stations in the U.S. Since 1999, the club is located in Emerson Electrical Company Hall.

Two broadcast radio stations are associated with Missouri S&T:

- KMNR, previously known as KMSM, is a student-run, freeform radio station whose music playlist varies with the mood and inclination of the DJ, with some playing caller requests. Every year KMNR hosts two concerts – Freakers Ball in the fall and MasqueRave (formerly Glitter Ball) in the spring.
- KMST, previously known as KUMR, is a member-supported public radio station, typically playing classical, bluegrass and jazz and National Public Radio programs. On July 16, 2007, KUMR officially changed its call letters to KMST, in advance of the change of name from "University of Missouri–Rolla" to the "Missouri University of Science and Technology". In 2017, KMST's broadcast operations were transferred to the University of Missouri–St. Louis.

=== Greek life ===
Approximately 22% of the undergraduate student body are reported to belong to a social Greek organization. There are a total of more than twenty fraternities and sororities.

The first fraternity established at the Missouri School of Mines and Metallurgy – in 1903 – was the Gamma Xi chapter of Sigma Nu. It is the fraternity's 62nd chapter, and remains active at Missouri S&T.

The Beta-Eta chapter of Tau Kappa Epsilon – the fraternity's 55th chapter – was founded at the Missouri School of Mines and Metallurgy in 1947. It remains active at Missouri S&T and has a chartered alumni association. As of fall 2022, the chapter had initiated 1,259 members and received 69 international awards.

=== University housing ===
The university offers several residence halls and apartment-style units for those who choose to live on campus. Most are to the north and northwest, along with a complex of efficiency suites near downtown Rolla.

=== Traditions ===
St. Patrick's Day is the largest annual celebration since its namesake is the patron saint of engineers. In 1903 engineering students of the University of Missouri in Columbia claimed St. Patrick's Day to be a holiday for engineers, citing that the legend of driving snakes out of Ireland could only be accomplished by an engineer. Students at the then-Missouri School of Mines had been invited to the Columbia campus as guests for their festivities, but in 1908 elected to observe their own St. Patrick's celebrations in Rolla. A bronze statue of St. Patrick, by St. Louis sculptor Rudolph Edward Torrini, is located on the Wilson Library Plaza. St. Patrick's Day 2008 marked the one hundredth consecutive year of the holiday's celebration at Missouri S&T. St. Patrick's, each year marketed as the "best ever", features charitable and social events which last throughout March. A major tradition of St. Pat's at S&T is the sweatshirt worn by most students and revelers; since 1963 a new design is annually created and sold on campus and throughout Rolla, with proceeds funding campus events and good causes. It is highlighted by a parade down Pine Street in downtown Rolla (annually painted green by S&T students) and the coronation of a student chosen to represent St. Patrick, along with others as "knights" of his court. For about 40 years, new knights were dumped into a trough of repugnant green liquid nicknamed "Alice". This particular event's popularity peaked in the 1980s, though the practice ended in the 1990s due to liability concerns by university administrators.
