= Missouri University of Science and Technology Nuclear Reactor =

Open pool nuclear reactor

MSTR
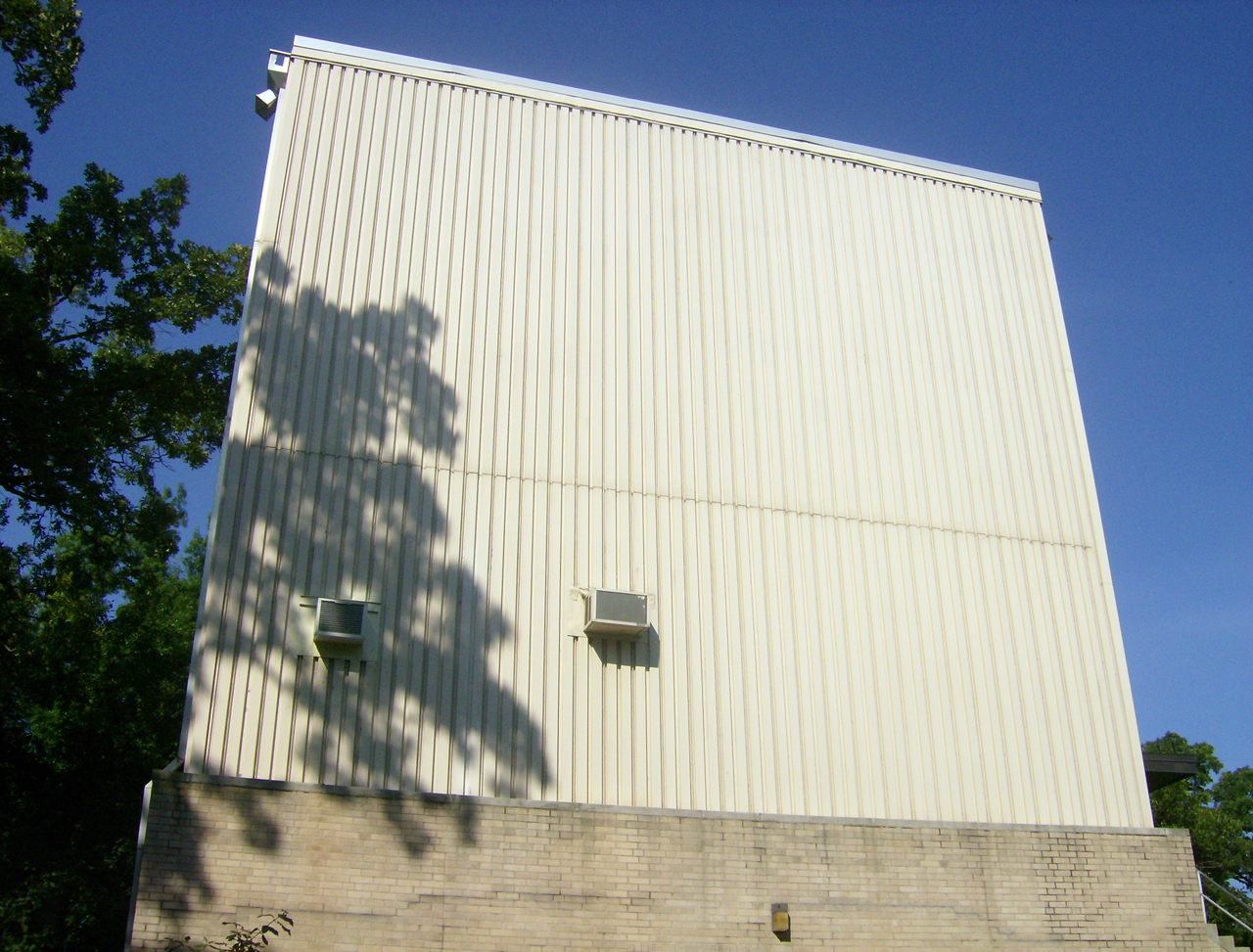
- The reactor in 2008
- Operating institution: Missouri University of Science and Technology
- Location: Rolla, Missouri
- Coordinates: 37°57′16″N 91°46′21″W
- Type: Pool
- Power: 200 kW (Thermal)

Construction and upkeep
- First criticality: 1961; 65 years ago

Technical specifications
- Fuel type: plate type (19x); 9-18 per assembly
- Cooling: Light water
- Neutron moderator: Light water
- Control rods: boron & stainless steel (4x)

The Missouri University of Science and Technology Nuclear Reactor (MSTR or Missouri S&TR) is a swimming pool type nuclear reactor operated by the Missouri University of Science and Technology (Missouri S&T). It first achieved criticality in 1961, making it the first operational nuclear reactor in the state of Missouri. Missouri S&T operates this reactor for training, education, and research purposes.

According to the 2020–2021 Annual Progress Report submitted to the Nuclear Regulatory Commission, MSTR was in use for 1,122.4 hours, including 228.4 hours while operating, and produced 13,563.19 kilowatt-hours of thermal energy.

== History ==
The reactor's design was based on that of the Bulk Shielding Reactor at Oak Ridge National Laboratory, and MSTR attained initial criticality on December 9, 1961, becoming the first operating nuclear reactor in the State of Missouri. The initial licensed power was 10 kW and was uprated to 200 kW in 1966. In middle 1992, the original high-enriched uranium was converted to low-enriched uranium during fuel loading. In March 2009, the MSTR license was renewed for another 20 years.

In June 2017, a suspicious package was found near the reactor that caused the evacuation of four Missouri University of Science and Technology campus buildings. The package was tested and analyzed by University Police and Fort Leonard Wood military specialists, but the package was determined as not dangerous.

Beginning in 2019, reactor operations were significantly hindered due to licensed staff turnover, and there were no full-time licensed operators on staff from June 14 to December 18, 2019. The two full-time MSTR senior reactor operators (SROs) resigned due to receiving poor compensation, and campus administration was unwilling to commit the necessary resources to retain the skilled staff due to budget cuts affecting the University of Missouri System. The COVID-19 pandemic also hindered MSTR operations starting in early March 2020.

In July 2025, Governor Mike Kehoe approved $3 million for MSTR to create a small modular nuclear reactor science and development program.

== Specifications ==
The reactor core is situated inside a standing pool of high-purity light water on a grid plate suspended from a movable rail bridge. The pool holds 32 thousand US gallons (120 m^{3}) of this water in a concrete casing that is 19 by 9 feet (5.8 m × 2.7 m) at the base with a depth of 27 to 30 feet (8.2 to 9.1 m). The approximately 19 fuel elements contain between 9 and 18 low-enriched uranium fuel plates. The reactor has a maximum power output of 200 kilowatts. The power produced is all thermal energy, and none of it is used to make electricity.

The reactor uses a total of four control rods. Three of these control rods are used for coarse power control and emergency SCRAM shutdowns and utilize a combination of stainless steel and boron. The other control rod is used for fine power control and simply uses stainless steel.

The building houses several experimental facilities. These facilities are used for research and for classroom lab activities. A thermal column, consisting of a 3.5×3.5×5 feet (1.1×1.1×1.5 m) block of graphite, provides a source of slow neutrons. A 6-inch (150 mm) diameter aluminum tube, called a beam port, can be positioned between the reactor core and an experimental area in the ground floor of the reactor building, allowing irradiation of a sample with higher energy neutrons. Other facilities, called rabbits, are used to pneumatically inject a sample directly into the core of the reactor for a specified amount of time. One of the rabbit facilities is lined with cadmium in order to stop low-energy neutrons while allowing bombardment of the sample with high-energy neutrons.

== Research ==
Funded by the DOE, a "dual-chambered internet-accessible heavily shielded facility with pneumatic access to the University of Missouri Science and Technology (Missouri S&T) 200 kW Research Nuclear Reactor (MSTR) core has been built and is currently available for irradiation and analysis of samples. The facility allows authorized distance users engaged in collaborative activities with Missouri S&T to remotely manipulate and analyze neutron irradiated samples."

In October 2012, Westinghouse Electric Corporation signed a multi-year research and collaboration agreement with Missouri S&T to utilize MSTR and "support the development of multiple cutting-edge research projects at the institutions that will benefit the Westinghouse Small Modular Reactor (SMR) project and the nuclear energy industry as a whole".

Researchers at Missouri S&T have conducted research with MSTR to study nuclear fuel pebbles for future use in generation IV reactors. Researchers at Missouri S&T have also developed a new mobile platform for measuring irradiated nuclear fuel pins while still submerged in a cooling pool, which is being used at MSTR for testing new types of nuclear fuel.

Involved in cancer research, MSTR has also been used to experiment with ways to improve the synthesis of radioactive gold and silver nanoparticles for targeting cancer cells.

== Outreach ==
Missouri S&T's nuclear engineering department is involved in outreach programs to rising high school juniors, seniors, and college freshmen, such as its summertime Nuclear Engineering Camp. The camp involves tours of the Missouri S&T reactor, as well as several focused areas of study and lab experiments related to nuclear engineering.

== See also ==
- University of Missouri Research Reactor Center
