= Ian Gatley =

American academic administrator

Ian Gatley was the former Provost and Senior Vice President for Academic Affairs of New Jersey Institute of Technology (NJIT) in Newark, New Jersey.
He is also a Distinguished Professor of Physics in the department of Physics at the College of Science and Liberal Arts in NJIT.
He is a prolific scholar well known in Astronomy and Imaging Science.

== Education ==
Gatley received his BS (first-class honors) in Physics (1972) from the University of London (Imperial College).
He earned his PhD in Physics (1978) from California Institute of Technology where he studied under Eric Becklin, Michael Werner and Gerry Neugebauer on board NASA’s Kuiper Airborne Observatory.

== Career ==
After getting his doctoral degree, Gatley became an Astronomer at United Kingdom Infrared Telescope in Hilo Hawaii in 1979. He was a Senior Principal Scientific Officer in 1986 before he left it to work as an Astronomer at the US National Optical Astronomy Observatories (NOAO) in Tucson Arizona.

As chair of the NOAO Steering Committee, Gatley led a collaboration team working on a project funded by the US Naval Observatory and NOAO to develop the world's largest InSb infrared detector array (the first megapixel device with a format of 1024 x 1024 pixels code-named Aladdin) which was adopted by major observatories around the world. His team also developed the first color infrared camera for Kitt Peak National Observatory in collaboration with the Space Telescope Science Institute.

Gatley left NOAO for Rochester Institute of Technology in 1997 where he held several positions over his tenure including: Director of Chester F. Carlson Center for Imaging Science (1997), Dean of the College of Science, and Director of the Center for Student Innovation and Undergraduate Research Support (2009). In May 2010 he was appointed Provost and Senior Vice President for Academic Affairs at New Jersey Institute of Technology which operates the Big Bear Solar Observatory (optical), and the Owens Valley Solar Array (radio), and served until December 2012 in that role.

Academic offices
Preceded by Priscilla Nelson, PhD	Provost of New Jersey Institute of Technology; May 2010 – December 2012	Succeeded by Fadi P. Deek, PhD
