= Index of Missouri-related articles =

The location of the state of Missouri in the United States of America

The following is an alphabetical list of articles related to the U.S. state of Missouri.

== 0–9 ==
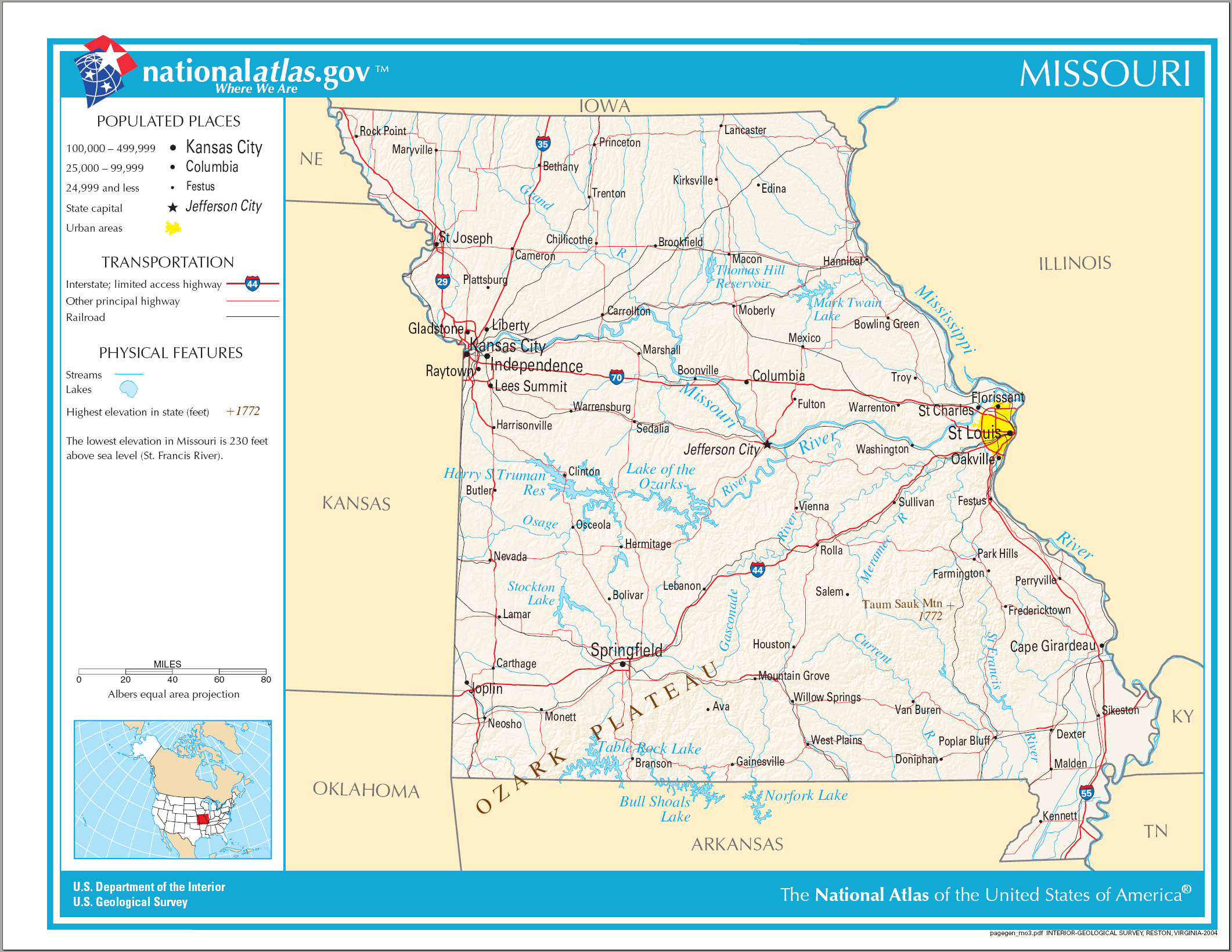
An enlargeable map of the state of Missouri

- .mo.us – Internet second-level domain for the state of Missouri
- 24th state to join the United States of America

== A ==
- Adjacent states: (one of only two states with eight neighboring states)
  - Commonwealth of Kentucky
  - State of Arkansas
  - State of Illinois
  - State of Iowa
  - State of Kansas
  - State of Nebraska
  - State of Oklahoma
  - State of Tennessee
- African Americans in Missouri
- Agriculture in Missouri
- Airports in Missouri
- Alcohol laws of Missouri
- Amusement parks in Missouri
- Arboreta in Missouri
  - commons:Category:Arboreta in Missouri
- Archaeology of Missouri
  - Category:Archaeological sites in Missouri
    - commons:Category:Archaeological sites in Missouri
- Architecture of Missouri
- Art museums and galleries in Missouri
  - commons:Category:Art museums and galleries in Missouri
- Astronomical observatories in Missouri
  - commons:Category:Astronomical observatories in Missouri
- Attorney General of the State of Missouri

== B ==
- Botanical gardens in Missouri
  - commons:Category:Botanical gardens in Missouri
- Buildings and structures in Missouri
  - commons:Category:Buildings and structures in Missouri

== C ==
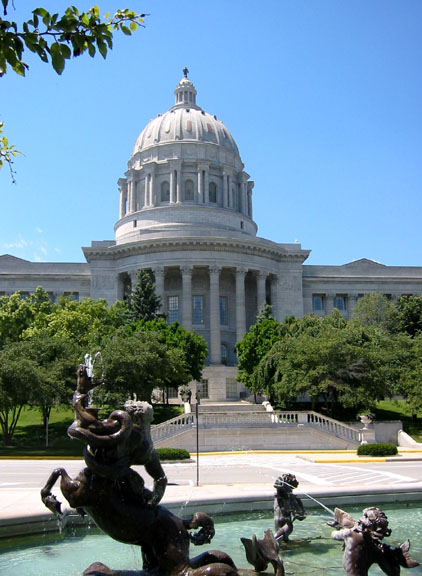
The Missouri State Capitol in Jefferson City

- Capital of the state of Missouri
- Capital punishment in Missouri
- Capitol of the State of Missouri
  - commons:Category:Missouri State Capitol
- Casinos in Missouri
- Caves of Missouri
  - commons:Category:Caves of Missouri
- Children's Education Alliance of Missouri
- Census statistical areas of Missouri
- Cities in Missouri
  - commons:Category:Cities in Missouri
- Climate of Missouri
  - Category:Climate of Missouri
- Climate change in Missouri
    - commons:Category:Climate of Missouri
- Colleges and universities in Missouri
  - commons:Category:Universities and colleges in Missouri

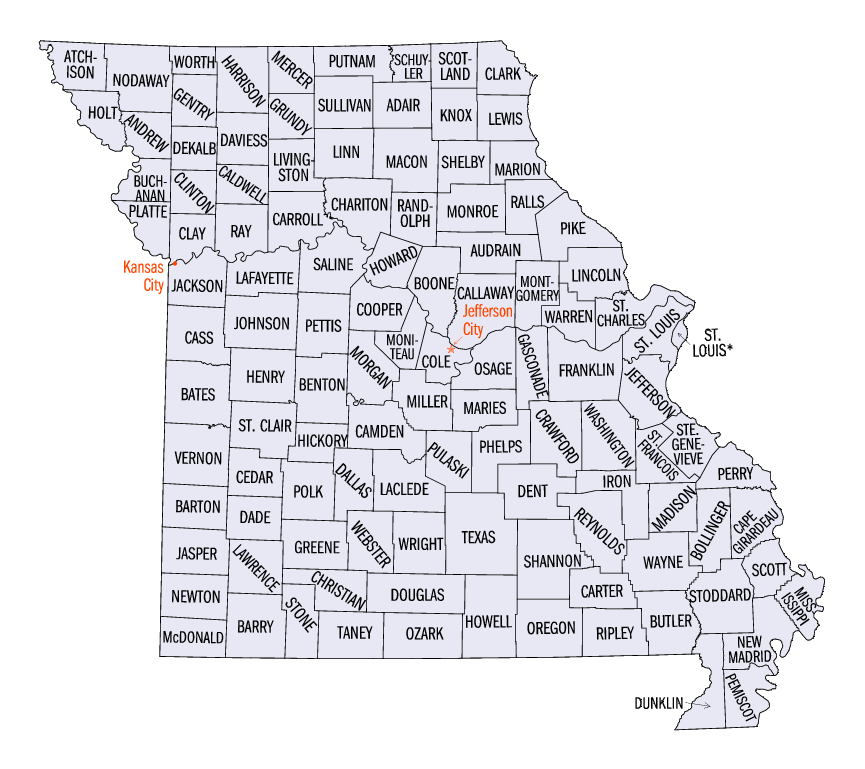
An enlargeable map of the 114 counties and 1 independent city of the state of Missouri

- Columbia, Missouri
- Communications in Missouri
  - commons:Category:Communications in Missouri
- Companies in Missouri
- Congressional districts of Missouri
- Constitution of the State of Missouri
- Convention centers in Missouri
  - commons:Category:Convention centers in Missouri
- Counties of the state of Missouri
  - commons:Category:Counties in Missouri
- Culture of Missouri
  - commons:Category:Missouri culture

== D ==
- Democratic Party of Missouri
- Demographics of Missouri
- Drug policy of Missouri

== E ==
- Economy of Missouri
  - Category:Economy of Missouri
    - commons:Category:Economy of Missouri
- Education in Missouri
  - Category:Education in Missouri
    - commons:Category:Education in Missouri
- Elections in Missouri
  - Category:Elections in Missouri
    - commons:Category:Elections in Missouri
- Category:Environment of Missouri
  - commons:Category:Environment of Missouri

== F ==
The flag of the state of Missouri

- Festivals in Missouri
  - commons:Category:Festivals in Missouri
- Flag of the state of Missouri
- Forts in Missouri
  - Category:Forts in Missouri
    - commons:Category:Forts in Missouri

== G ==
The Great Seal of the State of Missouri

- Geography of Missouri
  - Grand Divide
  - Category:Geography of Missouri
    - commons:Category:Geography of Missouri
- Geology of Missouri
  - commons:Category:Geology of Missouri
- Ghost towns in Missouri
  - Category:Ghost towns in Missouri
    - commons:Category:Ghost towns in Missouri
- Golf clubs and courses in Missouri
- Government of the state of Missouri website
  - Category:Government of Missouri
    - commons:Category:Government of Missouri
- Governor of the state of Missouri
  - List of governors of Missouri
- Great Seal of the State of Missouri

== H ==
- Henry Shaw Ozark Corridor
- Heritage railroads in Missouri
  - commons:Category:Heritage railroads in Missouri
- High schools of Missouri
- Higher education in Missouri
- Missouri State Highway System
- Hiking trails in Missouri
  - commons:Category:Hiking trails in Missouri
- Historic houses in Missouri
- History of Missouri
  - Historical outline of Missouri
- Hospitals in Missouri
- House of Representatives of the State of Missouri

== I ==
- Images of Missouri
  - commons:Category:Missouri

== J ==
- Jefferson City, Missouri, state capital since 1826

== K ==
- Kansas City, Missouri

== L ==
- Lakes of Missouri
  - commons:Category:Lakes of Missouri
- Landmarks in Missouri
  - commons:Category:Landmarks in Missouri
- Libertarian Party of Missouri
- Lieutenant governor of the state of Missouri
- Lists related to the state of Missouri:
  - List of airports in Missouri
  - List of census statistical areas in Missouri
  - List of cities in Missouri
  - List of colleges and universities in Missouri
  - List of United States congressional districts in Missouri
  - List of counties in Missouri
  - List of forts in Missouri
  - List of ghost towns in Missouri
  - List of governors of Missouri
  - List of high schools in Missouri
  - List of Interstate Highways in Missouri
  - List of historic houses in Missouri
  - List of hospitals in Missouri
  - List of individuals executed in Missouri
  - List of law enforcement agencies in Missouri
  - List of museums in Missouri
  - List of National Historic Landmarks in Missouri
  - List of newspapers in Missouri
  - List of people from Missouri
  - List of radio stations in Missouri
  - List of railroads in Missouri
  - List of Registered Historic Places in Missouri
  - List of rivers of Missouri
  - List of school districts in Missouri
  - List of snakes in Missouri
  - List of state forests in Missouri
  - List of state highways in Missouri
  - List of state parks in Missouri
  - List of state prisons in Missouri
  - List of symbols of the state of Missouri
  - List of television stations in Missouri
  - List of U.S. Routes in Missouri
  - List of Missouri's congressional delegations
  - List of United States congressional districts in Missouri
  - List of United States representatives from Missouri
  - List of United States senators from Missouri
  - Louisiana Purchase of 1803

== M ==
- Maps of Missouri
  - commons:Category:Maps of Missouri
- Mass media in Missouri
- Mississippi River
- Missouri website
  - Category:Missouri
    - commons:Category:Missouri
- Missouri Crematory
- Missouri Day
- Missouri First Steps
- Missouri Foundation for Health
- Missouri League of Women Voters
- Missouri Nation (Native American)
- Missouri Pacific Railroad
- Missouri River
- Missouri Compromise
- Missouri River 340
- Missouri State Capitol
- Missouri State Highway Patrol
- Missouri State League
- Missouri Wall of Fame
- Missourians for Equality
- MO – United States Postal Service postal code for the state of Missouri
- Monuments and memorials in Missouri
  - commons:Category:Monuments and memorials in Missouri
- Mountains of Missouri
  - commons:Category:Mountains of Missouri
- Museums in Missouri
  - Category:Museums in Missouri
    - commons:Category:Museums in Missouri
- Music of Missouri
  - commons:Category:Music of Missouri
  - Category:Musical groups from Missouri
  - Category:Musicians from Missouri

== N ==
- National forests of Missouri
  - commons:Category:National Forests of Missouri
- Natural history of Missouri
  - commons:Category:Natural history of Missouri
- Newspapers of Missouri

== O ==
- Outdoor sculptures in Missouri
  - commons:Category:Outdoor sculptures in Missouri

== P ==
- People from Missouri
  - Category:People from Missouri
    - commons:Category:People from Missouri
    - Category:People from Missouri by populated place
    - Category:People from Missouri by county
    - Category:People from Missouri by occupation
- Politics of Missouri
  - commons:Category:Politics of Missouri
  - Libertarian Party of Missouri
  - Missouri Democratic Party
  - Missouri Republican Party
  - Socialist Party of Missouri
- Protected areas of Missouri
  - commons:Category:Protected areas of Missouri

== R ==
- Radio stations in Missouri
- Railroad museums in Missouri
  - commons:Category:Railroad museums in Missouri
- Railroads in Missouri
- Registered historic places in Missouri
  - commons:Category:Registered Historic Places in Missouri
- Religion in Missouri
  - Category:Religion in Missouri
    - commons:Category:Religion in Missouri
- Republican Party of Missouri
- Rivers of Missouri
  - Mississippi River
  - Missouri River
  - commons:Category:Rivers of Missouri
- Rock formations in Missouri
  - commons:Category:Rock formations in Missouri
- Roller coasters in Missouri
  - commons:Category:Roller coasters in Missouri

== S ==
- St. Charles, Missouri, first state capital 1821-1826
- St. Louis, capital of the District of Louisiana 1804–1805, capital of the Territory of Louisiana 1805–1812, capital of the Territory of Missouri 1812-1821
  - previously as Saint-Louis, capital of la Haute-Louisiane 1800-1803
  - previously as San Luis, capital of Alta Louisiana 1765-1800
- School districts of Missouri
- Scouting in Missouri
- Senate of the State of Missouri
- Settlements in Missouri
  - Cities in Missouri
  - Towns in Missouri
  - Villages in Missouri
  - Townships in Missouri
  - Census Designated Places in Missouri
  - Other unincorporated communities in Missouri
  - List of ghost towns in Missouri
- Socialist Party of Missouri
- Sports in Missouri
  - Category:Sports in Missouri
    - commons:Category:Sports in Missouri
  - Category:Sports venues in Missouri
    - commons:Category:Sports venues in Missouri
- State Capitol of Missouri
- State Highway Patrol of Missouri
- State of Missouri website
  - Constitution of the State of Missouri
  - Government of the state of Missouri
    - Category:Government of Missouri
      - commons:Category:Government of Missouri
  - Executive branch of the government of the state of Missouri
    - Governor of the state of Missouri
  - Legislative branch of the government of the state of Missouri
    - Legislature of the State of Missouri
      - Senate of the State of Missouri
      - House of Representatives of the State of Missouri
  - Judicial branch of the government of the state of Missouri
    - Supreme Court of the State of Missouri
- State parks of Missouri
  - commons:Category:State parks of Missouri
- State prisons of Missouri
- Structures in Missouri
  - commons:Category:Buildings and structures in Missouri
- Supreme Court of the State of Missouri
- Symbols of the state of Missouri
  - Category:Symbols of Missouri
    - commons:Category:Symbols of Missouri

== T ==
- Telecommunications in Missouri
    - commons:Category:Communications in Missouri
- Telephone area codes in Missouri
- Television shows set in Missouri
- Television stations in Missouri
- Territory of Missouri
- Theatres in Missouri
  - commons:Category:Theatres in Missouri
- Tourism in Missouri website
  - commons:Category:Tourism in Missouri
- Transportation in Missouri
  - Category:Transportation in Missouri
    - commons:Category:Transport in Missouri

== U ==
- United States of America
  - States of the United States of America
  - United States census statistical areas of Missouri
  - Missouri's congressional delegations
  - United States congressional districts in Missouri
  - United States Court of Appeals for the Eighth Circuit
  - United States District Court for the Eastern District of Missouri
  - United States District Court for the Western District of Missouri
  - United States representatives from Missouri
  - United States senators from Missouri
- Universities and colleges in Missouri
  - commons:Category:Universities and colleges in Missouri
- University of Missouri
  - commons:Category:University of Missouri
- US-MO – ISO 3166-2:US region code for the State of Missouri

== W ==
- Water parks in Missouri
  Wikimedia
  - Wikimedia Commons:Category:Missouri
    - commons:Category:Maps of Missouri
  - Wikinews:Category:Missouri
    - Wikinews:Portal:Missouri
  - Wikipedia Category:Missouri
    - Wikipedia Portal:Missouri
    - Wikipedia:WikiProject Missouri
      - Category:WikiProject Missouri articles
      - Category:WikiProject Missouri

== Z ==
- Zoos in Missouri
  - commons:Category:Zoos in Missouri

== See also ==
- Topic overview:
  - Missouri
  - Outline of Missouri
