= Outline of Missouri =

Overview of and topical guide to Missouri

The flag of Missouri

The seal of Missouri

The location of the state of Missouri in the United States of America

The following outline is provided as an overview of and topical guide to the U.S. state of Missouri:

Missouri – U.S. state named for the Missouri River, which was named after the Missouria indian tribe. The Smithsonian Bureau of American Ethnology states that Missouri means town of the large canoes. Other authorities say the original native American syllables (from which the word came) mean wooden canoe people, he of the big canoe, or river of the big canoes. Located in the Midwestern United States, the state lies on the Mississippi River, which defines its eastern border. The land that is now Missouri was acquired from France as part of the Louisiana Purchase and became known as the Missouri Territory. Part of this Territory was admitted into the union as the 24th state on August 10, 1821.

== General reference ==
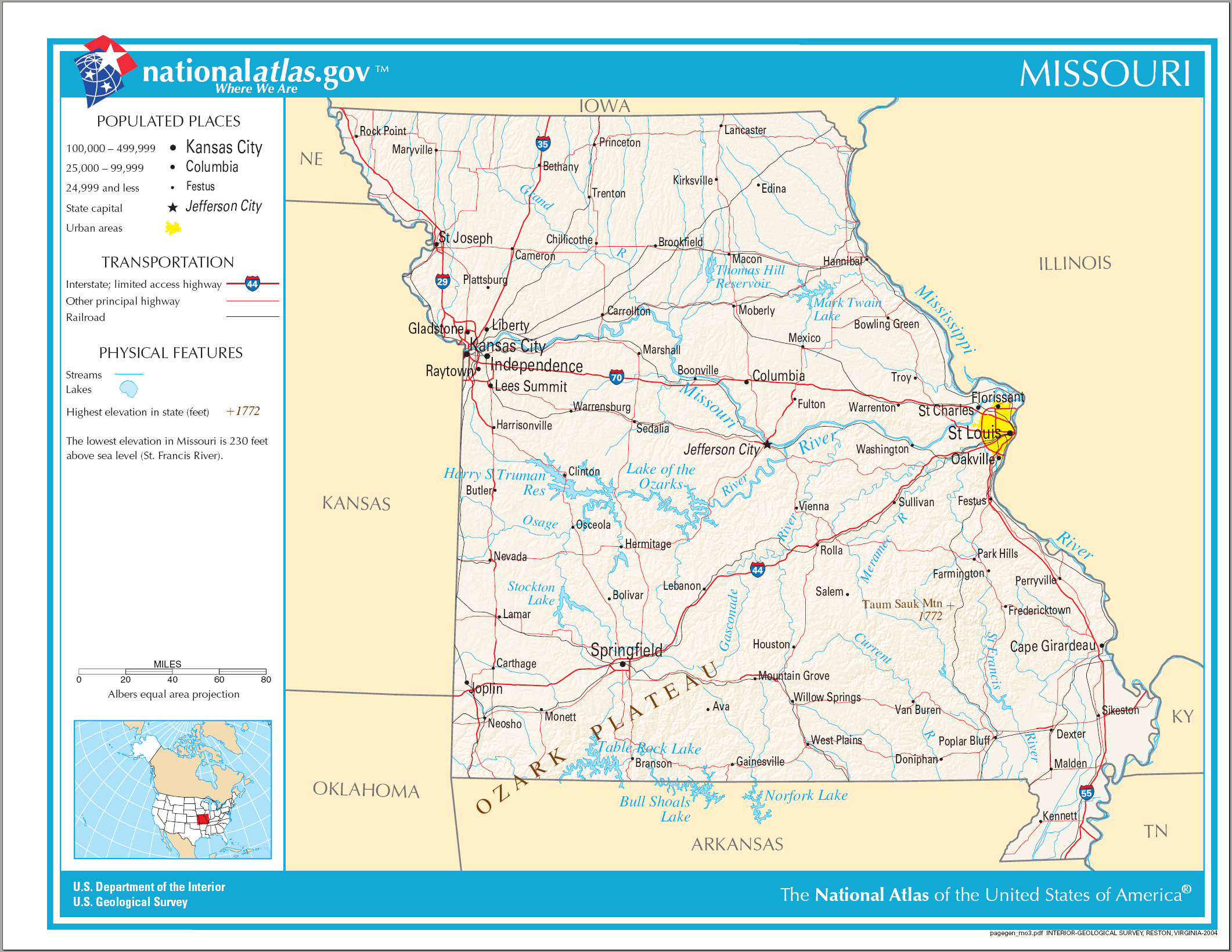
An enlargeable map of the state of Missouri

- Names
  - Common name: Missouri
    - /mɪˈzʊəri/, and by many residents /mɪˈzʊərə/
  - Official name: State of Missouri
  - Abbreviations and name codes
    - Postal symbol: MO
    - ISO 3166-2 code: US-MO
    - Internet second-level domain: .mo.us
  - Nicknames
    - Bullion State
    - Cave State
    - Gateway State
    - Bellwether State
    - Lead State
    - Ozark State
    - Puke State (reported in 1881)
    - Sleepy State
    - Show-Me State (currently used on license plates)
- Adjectival: Missouri
- Demonym: Missourian

== Geography of Missouri ==
Geography of Missouri

- Missouri is: a U.S. state, a federal state of the United States of America
- Location
  - Northern Hemisphere
  - Western Hemisphere
    - Americas
      - North America
        - Anglo America
        - Northern America
          - United States of America
            - Contiguous United States
              - Central United States
                - West North Central States
              - Western United States
                - Midwestern United States
- Population of Missouri: 5,988,927 (2010 U.S. Census)
- Area of Missouri
- Atlas of Missouri

=== Places in Missouri ===
- Historic places in Missouri
  - National Historic Landmarks in Missouri
  - National Register of Historic Places listings in Missouri
    - Bridges on the National Register of Historic Places in Missouri
- National Natural Landmarks in Missouri
- National parks in Missouri: none. See also List of national parks of the United States and List of the United States National Park System official units
- State parks in Missouri

=== Environment of Missouri ===
- Climate of Missouri
- Protected areas in Missouri
  - State forests of Missouri
- Superfund sites in Missouri
- Wildlife of Missouri
  - Fauna of Missouri
    - Birds of Missouri
    - Mammals of Missouri
    - Reptiles
      - Snakes of Missouri
- Missouri Coalition for the Environment

==== Natural geographic features of Missouri ====
- Caves of Missouri
- Islands of Missouri
  - Howell Island
  - Tower Rock
- Lakes of Missouri
  - Big Lake
  - Mud Lake
  - Norfork Lake
- Mountains of Missouri
  - The Ozarks
  - St. Francois Mountains
- Rivers of Missouri
  - Mississippi River
  - Missouri River

=== Regions of Missouri ===
- Central Missouri

==== Administrative divisions of Missouri ====
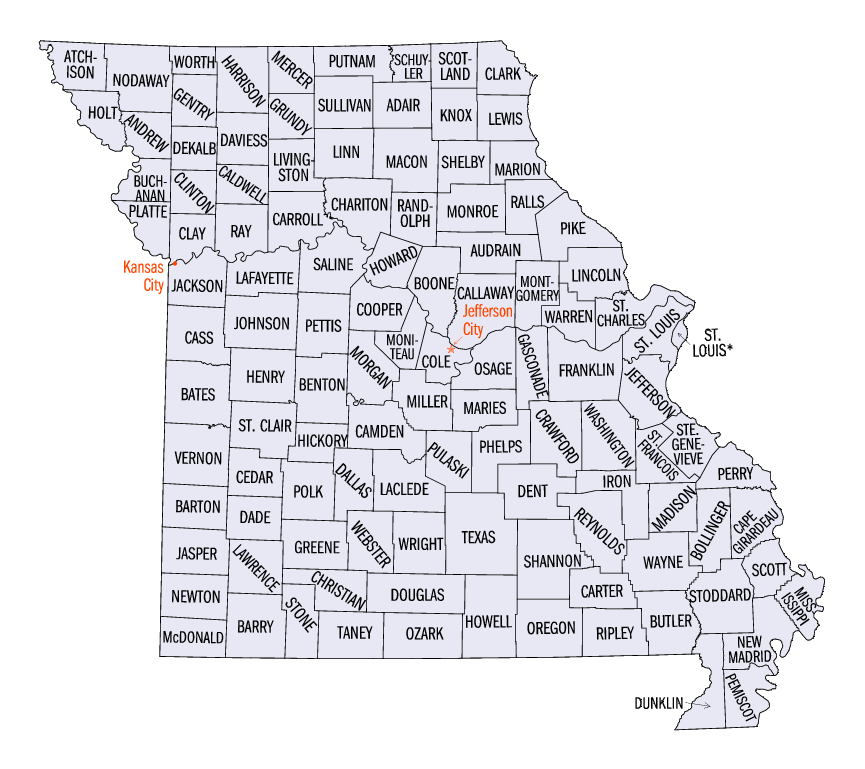
An enlargeable map of the 114 counties and 1 independent city of the State of Missouri

- The 114 Counties of the State of Missouri
- Cities in Missouri
  - State capital of Missouri: Jefferson City
  - City nicknames in Missouri
- List of townships in Missouri

=== Demography of Missouri ===
Demographics of Missouri

== Government and politics of Missouri ==
Law and government of Missouri

- Form of government: U.S. state government
- Missouri's congressional delegations
- Missouri State Capitol
- Elections in Missouri
- Political party strength in Missouri

=== Branches of the government of Missouri ===
Government of Missouri

==== Executive branch of the government of Missouri ====
- Governor of Missouri
  - Lieutenant Governor of Missouri
  - Secretary of State of Missouri
  - State Treasurer of Missouri
- State departments
  - Missouri Department of Transportation

==== Legislative branch of the government of Missouri ====
- Missouri General Assembly (bicameral)
  - Upper house: Missouri Senate
  - Lower house: Missouri House of Representatives

==== Judicial branch of the government of Missouri ====
Courts of Missouri

- Supreme Court of Missouri

=== Law and order in Missouri ===
Law of Missouri

- Cannabis in Missouri
- Capital punishment in Missouri
  - Individuals executed in Missouri
- Constitution of Missouri
- Crime in Missouri
- Gun laws in Missouri
- Law enforcement in Missouri
  - Law enforcement agencies in Missouri
    - Missouri State Police

=== Military in Missouri ===
- Missouri Air National Guard
- Missouri Army National Guard

== History of Missouri ==
History of Missouri List of battles fought in Missouri

=== History of Missouri, by period ===
The location of the State of Missouri in the United States of America

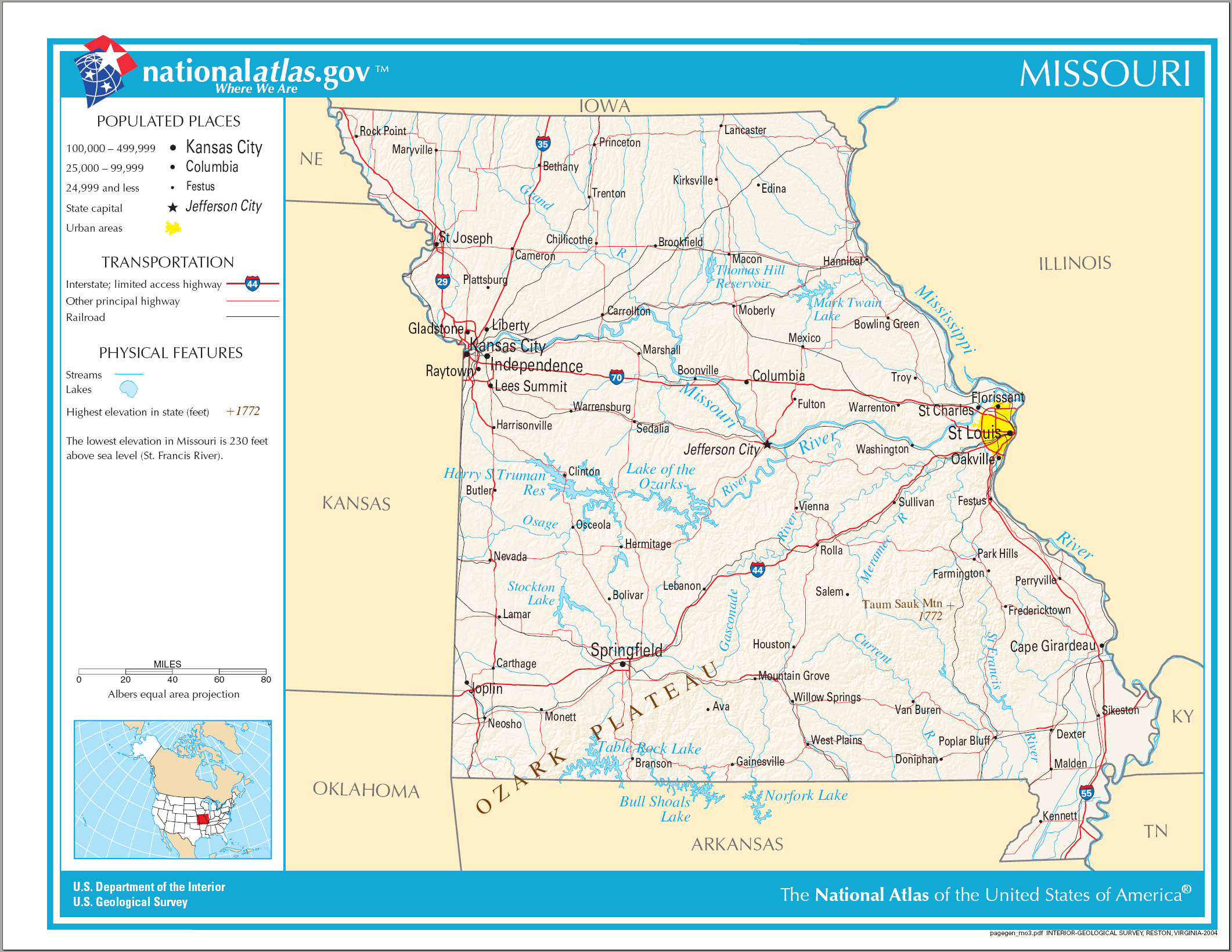
An enlargeable map of the State of Missouri

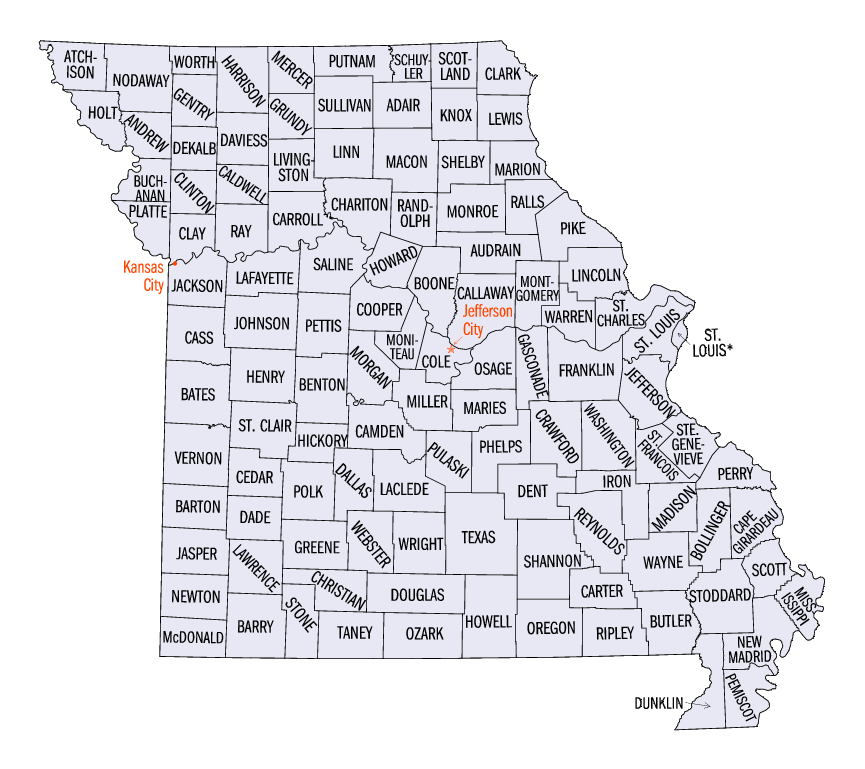
An enlargeable map of the 114 counties and 1 independent city of the State of Missouri

- Indigenous peoples
  - Mississippian culture
- French colony of Louisiane, 1699–1764
  - Treaty of Fontainebleau of 1762
- Spanish (though predominantly Francophone) district of Alta Luisiana, 1764–1803
  - Third Treaty of San Ildefonso of 1800
- French district of Haute-Louisiane, 1803
  - Louisiana Purchase of 1803
- Unorganized U.S. territory created by the Louisiana Purchase, 1803–1804
  - Lewis and Clark Expedition, 1804–1806
- District of Louisiana, 1804–1805
- Territory of Louisiana, 1805–1812
  - Pike Expedition, 1806–1807
- Territory of Missouri, 1812–1821
  - War of 1812, June 18, 1812 – March 23, 1815
    - Treaty of Ghent, December 24, 1814
  - Missouri Compromise of 1820
- State of Missouri becomes 24th State admitted to the United States of America on August 10, 1821
  - Platte Purchase, 1836–1837
  - Mexican–American War, April 25, 1846 – February 2, 1848
  - Pony Express, 1860–1861
  - American Civil War, April 12, 1861 – May 13, 1865
    - Missouri in the American Civil War
      - Border state, 1861–1865
      - Battle of Wilson's Creek, August 10, 1861
      - Price's Raid, September 27 – December 2, 1864
  - Harry S. Truman becomes 33rd President of the United States on April 12, 1945

=== History of Missouri, by region ===
- History of Columbia, Missouri
- History of the Kansas City metropolitan area
- History of St. Louis, Missouri
  - History of the Jews in St. Louis, Missouri

=== History of Missouri, by subject ===
- History of education in Missouri
  - History of the University of Missouri
- List of Missouri state legislatures
- History of slavery in Missouri

== Culture of Missouri ==
- Museums in Missouri
- Religion in Missouri
  - The Church of Jesus Christ of Latter-day Saints in Missouri
  - Episcopal Diocese of Missouri
- Scouting in Missouri
- State symbols of Missouri
  - Flag of the State of Missouri
  - Great Seal of the State of Missouri

=== The Arts in Missouri ===
- Music of Missouri

=== Sports in Missouri ===
- Sports in Missouri

== Economy and infrastructure of Missouri ==
Economy of Missouri

- Communications in Missouri
  - Newspapers in Missouri
  - Radio stations in Missouri
  - Television stations in Missouri
- Health care in Missouri
  - Hospitals in Missouri
- Transportation in Missouri
  - Airports in Missouri

== Education in Missouri ==
Education in Missouri

- Schools in Missouri
  - School districts in Missouri
    - High schools in Missouri
  - Colleges and universities in Missouri
    - University of Missouri
    - Missouri State University

== See also ==
- Topic overview:
  - Missouri
  - Index of Missouri-related articles
