= Rex Sinquefield =

American businessman and political activist

- Born: Rex Andrew Sinquefield; September 7, 1944 (age 82); St. Louis, Missouri, US
- Education: Saint Louis University; University of Chicago
- Occupation: President of Show-Me Institute
- Political party: Republican

Rex Andrew Sinquefield (/ˈsɪŋkfiːld/; born September 7, 1944) is an American businessman, investor, and philanthropist who has been called an 'index-fund pioneer' for contributing to the early development and popularization of passively managed index funds among retail investors. Sinquefield was also a co-founder of Dimensional Fund Advisors. A member of the Republican Party, he is active in Missouri politics.

== Early life and education ==
Sinquefield had 18 cleft palate operations before age five. His father died when he was five years old. Sinquefield and his brother were placed in a local Catholic orphanage, the Saint Vincent Home for Children in St. Louis, Missouri. Sinquefield told the BBC that the school's regimentation taught him self-discipline. When they were teenagers, Sinquefield and his brother returned home to live with their mother.

He graduated from Bishop DuBourg High School in 1962. He studied to be a priest at the Diocesan Seminary at Cardinal Glennon College in St. Louis. During the Vietnam War, he served as what he described as a "high-end gopher" in the Finance Corps at Fort Riley. He majored in business for his undergraduate degree from Saint Louis University and received an MBA from University of Chicago.

== Career ==
Sinquefield worked at the American National Bank of Chicago, where in 1973 he developed the first S&P 500 passively managed index fund open to the general public. Due to high transaction costs at the time and low-liquidity for many smaller company stocks, Sinquefield did not initially buy all 500 stocks listed in the S&P 500, but he was able to nonetheless closely track the index. After seven years, the fund managed $12 billion.

In May 1974, in the depths of the 1973–1974 stock market crash, Sinquefield and Roger Ibbotson predicted that the Dow Jones Industrial Average, in the 800s at the time, would hit 9,218 in 1998 and 10,000 by November 1999. Their prediction proved largely accurate: at the end of 1998 the Dow was 9,181, and it reached 10,000 in March 1999.

=== Dimensional Fund Advisors ===
In 1981, Sinquefield and another University of Chicago teaching assistant, David G. Booth, co-founded Dimensional Fund Advisors, the first passive fund focused on small (microcap) companies customarily ignored in large institutional portfolios of the era. As of June 30, 2018, it managed more than $582 billion in assets.

With Yale School of Management professor Roger G. Ibbotson, he co-wrote the 1989 book Stocks, Bonds, Bills and Inflation, a study of stock market returns.

Dimensional Fund Advisors' investment strategy has been said to create an optimal portfolio consisting of various funds that emulate the different style and size attributes of various securities markets worldwide so that one fund might behave like the S&P 500, another might correlate with just the value stocks in the S&P 500, while a third might emulate the performance of all small-cap stocks. Sinquefield is a proponent of passive investment, meaning that he believes you simply cannot beat the market.

In 2005, he retired from DFA because he was “bored” and returned to St. Louis, where he became involved in politics and philanthropy.

In 2024, DFA funded an Errol Morris documentary about Sinquefield and Booth.

== Politics ==
Sinquefield is one of the top right-wing political funders in the country, and the single top political spender in Missouri, having spent at least $31.5 million between 2006 and 2014, Brendan Fischer, general counsel of the Center for Media and Democracy, wrote in 2014. Sinquefield has contributed toward measures to dismantle teacher tenure, enact water privatization and right-to-work, privatize the St. Louis Lambert International Airport, merge St. Louis City and St. Louis County, and expand charter schools.

=== Show-Me Institute ===
On his return to St. Louis, Sinquefield co-founded the Show-Me Institute with R. Crosby Kemper III, a Kansas City banker. Based in Clayton, Show-Me is a think tank that commissions studies on public-policy issues. It has been labeled libertarian, conservative, and free-market. He is president of the institute, whose motto is “Advancing liberty with responsibility by promoting market solutions for Missouri public policy.”

Show-Me has successfully lobbied for a cable franchise reform bill and HB 818, which made Missouri the first state to let employers contribute pretax dollars to employees' health-savings accounts. Show-Me has also opposed governments' use of eminent domain.

=== Campaign contributions ===
Sinquefield began giving money to Missouri politicians of both political parties after the state legislature eliminated campaign-finance limits in 2009, and by 2015, had given money to "big majorities" of lawmakers in both houses of the Missouri legislature. He has particularly focused on altering public education, tax reform, and accountability in government.

He donated $1 million to Republican Bev Randles' 2016 campaign for lieutenant governor of Missouri and some $750,000 to Kurt Schaefer, a Republican candidate for attorney general. Both candidates lost.

Sinquefield has also donated to Missouri candidates Shane Schoeller, Chris Koster, and Sarah Steelman, as well as to the 2016 gubernatorial campaign of Catherine Hanaway.

In 2014, he supported a ballot initiative to abolish teacher tenure in Missouri. He is a major funder of right-wing groups and PACs, such as Pelopidas, LLC.

In 2019, Sinquefield was found to be among the dark money donors behind a failed 2018 medical cannabis initiative.

Sinquefield and his wife Jeanne gave money to Senator Josh Hawley's campaign in 2020. Sinquefield also donated to Mike Parson that year.

In 2021, Sinquefield donated $250,000 to two campaigns: Scott Fitzpatrick's bid for state auditor and Mike Kehoe's prospective candidacy for governor in 2024.

In 2022, Sinquefield made a small contribution to Lori Chavez-DeRemer during her successful bid for the U.S. House of Representatives. Chavez-DeRemer rose to national prominence, being appointed Secretary of Labor in the second administration of Donald Trump.

=== Tax policy activism ===
Sinquefield has long tried to change tax policy in Missouri, particularly in ways that would reduce his taxes and raise those of lower earners. He advocates eliminating the state's income tax and replacing it with a more comprehensive sales tax. He advocates replacing Missouri's and Kansas' income tax with a state sales tax on things like childcare, restaurants, and hotels.

Sinquefield also gave money to the group Kansans for No Income Tax which helped governor Sam Brownback lower the state income tax in 2012. Dubbed the Kansas experiment, this policy decreased state revenues by hundreds of millions of dollars; caused spending on roads, bridges, and education to be slashed; and failed to lift the state’s below-average economic growth. In 2017, the Republican-controlled Legislature of Kansas voted to roll back the cuts and overrode Brownback's veto.

Sinquefield also has repeatedly backed measures to repeal the earnings taxes of St. Louis and Kansas City, Missouri.

He is the primary financial supporter of the Let Voters Decide committee. In 2010, the committee placed a statewide initiative on the Missouri ballot. Called Proposition A, it would prevent all Missouri communities except Kansas City and St. Louis from imposing earnings taxes. It would also allow Kansas City and St. Louis voters to vote on whether to retain their earnings taxes. Missourians passed proposition A with a large margin – 68.4% YES / 31.6% NO (1,294,911 YES votes to 598,010 NO votes).

On January 5, 2011, Let Voters Decide submitted nine initiative petitions to the Missouri Secretary of State calling for a repeal of the state's income tax – with a top rate of six percent. The petitions also called for a higher sales tax, capped at seven percent, that would be applied to virtually any good or service transaction involving individuals. Sinquefield and Let Voters Decide President Travis Brown say that replacing the income tax with a sales tax would help create jobs, promote economic development and make state revenue collection less volatile. In 2014, Missouri lowered its income tax rate.

=== Local control of St. Louis Metropolitan Police Department ===
Sinquefield supported the successful effort to return local control of the St. Louis Metropolitan Police Department to the City of St. Louis. Since 1861, the police department had been run by a five-person board that included four gubernatorial appointees.

Sinquefield donated $300,000 to "A Safer Missouri", a group supporting the campaign for local control. A Safer Missouri endorsed state legislation in favor of local control, along with a ballot initiative filed with the Missouri Secretary of State, which will be pursued if the legislative efforts fail, according to a spokeswoman for A Safer Missouri. The ballot initiative was filed and entitled Proposition A.

Local control, the Proposition A ballot initiative, received broad support, including St. Louis Mayor Francis Slay, and the Missouri Democratic Party On February 22, 2011, the House of Representatives passed House Bill 71, the local measure in that body, by a vote of 109–46. The bill went on the Senate, Senate Bill 23, which failed. Thus the ballot initiative was filed and on November 6, 2012, Proposition A passed with 63.9% to 36.1%.

=== Airport privatization ===
Rex Sinquefield has been deeply involved in efforts to privatize the St. Louis Lambert International Airport. He split with Travis Brown, his former consultant, after the ballot initiative was withdrawn in 2020.

== Philanthropy ==
Sinquefield and his family donate funds to a wide variety of organizations through the Sinquefield Charitable Foundation. The foundation has donated in particular to the Today and Tomorrow Education Foundation, the Children's Education Alliance of Missouri, the Special Learning Center, the Dual Masters Scholarship Program at Saint Louis University, the St. Louis Chess Club, World Chess Hall of Fame, and the Mizzou New Music Initiative.

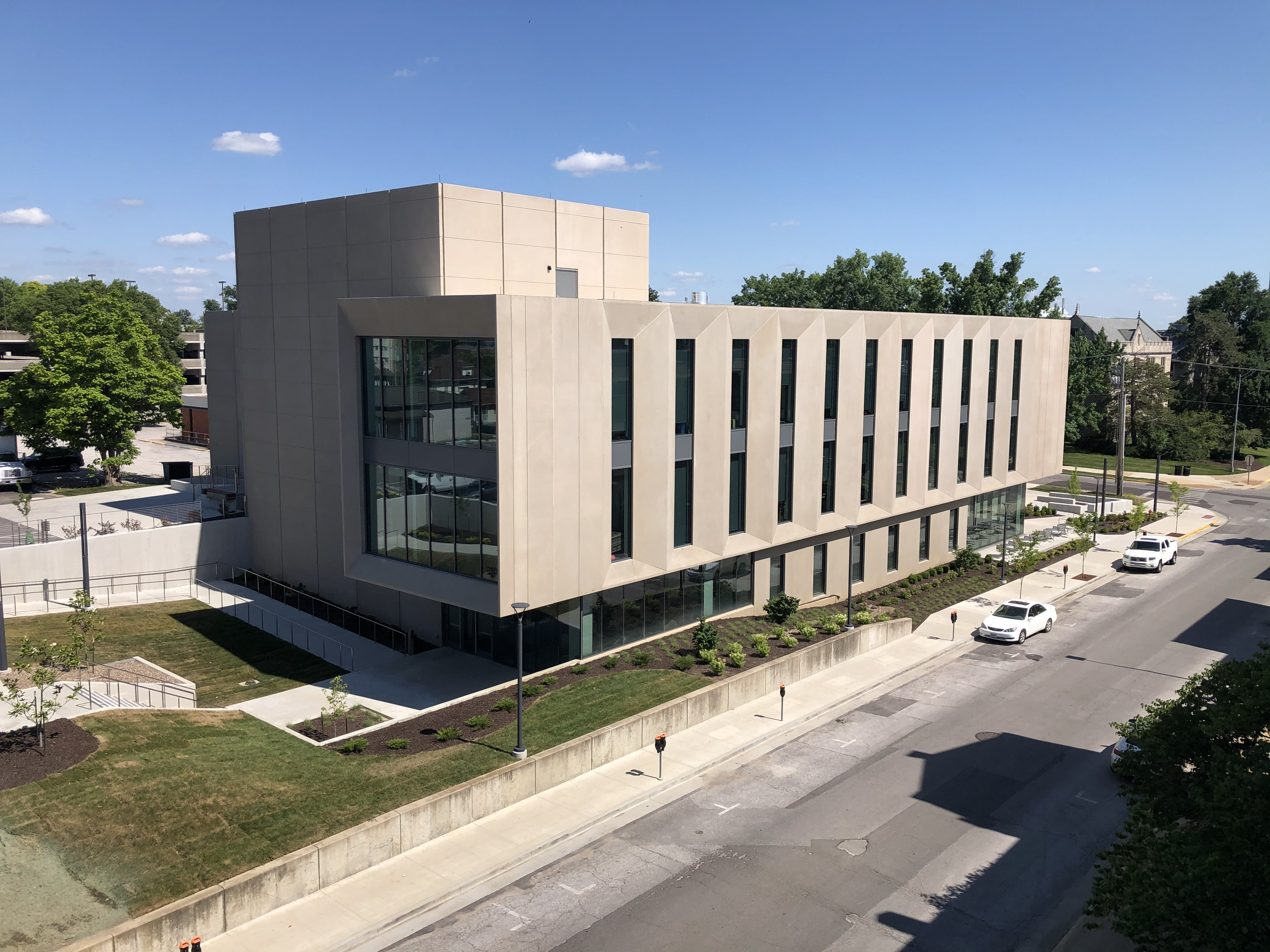
The Sinquefield Music Center at the University of Missouri

In 2009, Sinquefield and his wife gave $1 million to the University of Missouri's School of Music. Those funds were used to create the New Music Initiative, an effort designed to encourage young people to become composers and to support new works of music composition. Sinquefield has contributed to the St. Vincent Home for Children.

In 2018, Sinquefield and his wife donated $50 million to Saint Louis University as part of the university's bicentennial celebration. The gift helped to fund a new Saint Louis University Research Institute and fund the construction of a new Interdisciplinary Science and Engineering building on SLU's campus. The gift was the largest single donation in Saint Louis University's history.

Sinquefield is a director of St. Vincent Home for Children in St. Louis, and a life trustee of DePaul University. He serves on the boards of Saint Louis University, the St. Louis Symphony, the St. Louis Art Museum, the Missouri Botanical Garden, and the Contemporary Art Museum St. Louis. He advises the Archdiocese of St. Louis on finance.

=== Saint Louis chess ===
Since the 2000s, Sinquefield has spent tens of millions of dollars to boost chess in St. Louis and the United States, believing that the game can transform children and their academic lives.

In 2007, he opened the Chess Club and Scholastic Center of Saint Louis—later renamed the Saint Louis Chess Club—a non-profit organization meant to "maintain a formal program of instruction to teach the game of chess and to promote and support its educational program through community outreach and local and national partnerships to increase the awareness of the educational value of chess." Backed by Sinquefield's largesse, the club quickly grew to prominence in the U.S. chess community. In 2009, the club began hosting the annual U.S. Championships and U.S. Women's Championships.

In 2010, Sinquefield bought the recently closed World Chess Hall of Fame, renovated a house across the street from the Chess Club, and moved it to St. Louis. In 2013 he launched the Sinquefield Cup, a super-grandmaster tournament. In 2018 he suggested that he had spent some $50 million on chess-related philanthropy.

== Personal life ==
Sinquefield and his wife, Jeanne, met at the Judo Club at the University of Chicago. They have three children and worked together at DFA, where Jeanne ran the trading department.

Since their return to St. Louis, they have divided their time between a 1,000-acre farm and a large house in the Central West End. St. Louis Magazine said he showed people around the orphanage, now called St. Vincent's Home for Children.

Sinquefield is a devout Roman Catholic.
