= MFH =

MFH may refer to:

- Malignant fibrous histiocytoma
- Master of Foxhounds
- Missouri Foundation for Health
- Multi-family housing
- Mesquite Airport Nevada IATA code
