= Bishop DuBourg High School =

Private school in St. Louis, Missouri, United States

Location
- 5850 Eichelberger Street; St. Louis, Missouri 63109; United States; 38°34′53″N 90°17′42″W

Information
- Type: Private, Coeducational
- Motto: Faith in Christ...Service to Others
- Religious affiliation: Roman Catholic
- Established: 1950; 76 years ago
- Founder: Archbishop Joseph Ritter
- Oversight: Archdiocese of Saint Louis
- President: Monica Freese
- Principal: Amy Schroff
- Faculty: 40
- Grades: 9–12
- Colors: Scarlet and white
- Nickname: Cavaliers
- Accreditation: Cognia
- Yearbook: The Cavalier
- Eponym: Louis Dubourg, Bishop of the Diocese of Louisiana and the Two Floridas
- Website: bishopdubourg.org

Bishop DuBourg High School is a private, Roman Catholic high school in St. Louis, Missouri. It is located in the Roman Catholic Archdiocese of Saint Louis.

== Notable alumni ==
- Norbert Leo Butz (1985), Tony Award-winning American stage, musical theatre, television and film actor and singer
- Jack Dorsey (1995), Co-founder of Twitter, Co-founder of Block, Inc., founder of Bluesky
- Rory Ellinger, (1959), civil rights activist and accomplished Legislator in the Missouri House of Representatives from 2010-2014.
- Steve Frank (1959), attorney; professional and national team soccer player
- Larry Hausmann (1959), Professional and national team soccer player.
- Jeannie Leavitt (1985), First female fighter pilot in the US Air Force
- Rich Niemann (1964), NBA player
- Ken Page (1972), American actor/singer
- Rex Sinquefield (1962), co-founder of Dimensional Fund Advisors, founder and president of the Show-Me Institute, a public policy research organization based in St. Louis.
- Steve Stenger (1990), American attorney, former Democratic politician, and former chief executive of Saint Louis County, sentenced to 46 months in prison for bribery and corruption
