= Rik Hafer =

American economist

Academic background
- Education: University of Nebraska–Lincoln (B.A., 1975), Virginia Tech (Ph.D., 1979)

Academic work
- Discipline: Monetary economics, growth economics
- Institutions: Federal Reserve Bank of St. Louis; Washington University in St. Louis; Southern Illinois University at Edwardsville; Lindenwood University
- Website: Information at IDEAS / RePEc

Rik W. Hafer is an American economist. From 2016 to 2022 he was a professor of economics in the Plaster School of Business and Entrepreneurship at Lindenwood University and the Director for the Center of Economics and the Environment in the Hammond Institute for Free Enterprise. Before joining the faculty of Lindenwood in 2016, he taught at Southern Illinois University at Edwardsville (SIUE), where he was a professor of economics. While at SIUE he held multiple positions, including Chair of the Department of Economics and Finance, and Distinguished Research Professor of Economics and Finance. Prior to joining the faculty at SIUE in 1989, he worked as a research economist from 1979 to 1989 at the Federal Reserve Bank of St. Louis. He has been a Research Fellow with the Show-Me Institute, a consultant to the Central Bank of the Philippines, and a visiting scholar at the Federal Reserve Banks of Atlanta and St. Louis.
