= James H. Peck =

American judge

James Peck
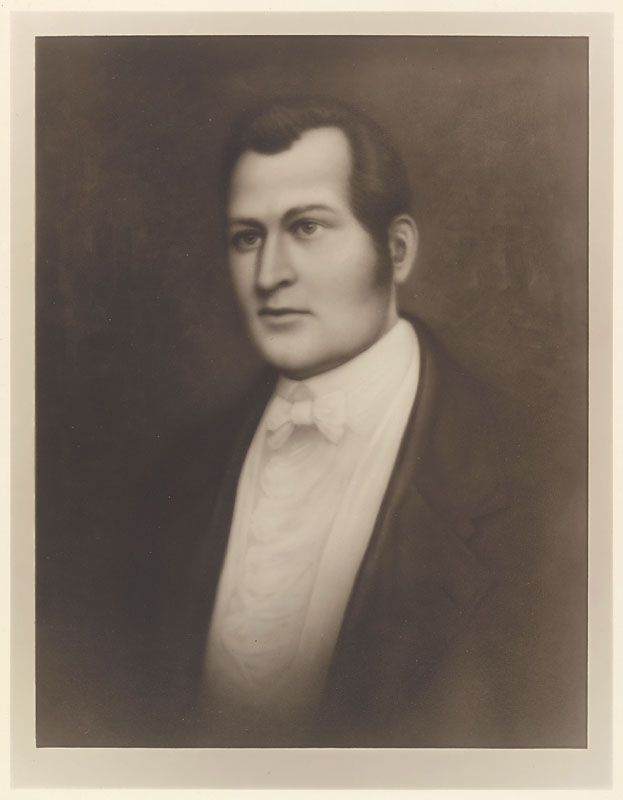

Judge of the United States District Court for the District of Missouri
- In office April 5, 1822 – April 29, 1836
- Appointed by: James Monroe
- Preceded by: Seat established
- Succeeded by: Robert William Wells

Personal details
- Born: James Hawkins Peck; January 12, 1790 Jefferson City, North Carolina, U.S.
- Died: April 29, 1836 (aged 46) St. Charles, Missouri, U.S.

James Hawkins Peck (January 12, 1790 – April 29, 1836) was a United States district judge of the United States District Court for the District of Missouri.

== Education and career ==
Peck was born on January 12, 1790, in Mossy Creek (now Jefferson City), North Carolina (Southwest Territory from May 26, 1790, State of Tennessee from June 1, 1796). During the War of 1812, he joined Taylor's Brigade of the Tennessee Militia in September 1814 as an Assistant Topographic Engineer. He entered private practice in Tennessee until 1818. He continued private practice in St. Louis, Missouri Territory (State of Missouri from August 10, 1821) from 1818 to 1822.

== Federal judicial service ==
Peck was nominated by President James Monroe on March 26, 1822, to the United States District Court for the District of Missouri, to a new seat authorized by 3 Stat. 653. He was confirmed by the United States Senate on April 5, 1822, and received his commission the same day. His service terminated on April 29, 1836, due to his death in St. Charles, Missouri.

=== Allegations of abuse of power, impeachment and acquittal ===
Peck was involved in several land claim cases arising out of the Louisiana territory purchase; in one such case in 1825 he ruled against the client of the lawyer Luke Lawless and published his opinion in a St. Louis newspaper the following year. In response, Lawless posted an anonymous letter rebutting Peck's ruling in another newspaper. The authorship of the letter soon became known and Peck found Lawless in contempt of Court for:

Intent to impair the public confidence in the upright intentions of said court, and to bring odium upon the court, and especially with intent to impress the public mind, and particularly many litigants in this court, that they are not to expect justice in the cases now pending therein.

Peck had Lawless placed in jail for 24 hours and removed his right to practice in a federal court for 18 months. Lawless began a crusade against Peck, which included submitting his own memorial for impeachment to the House. This memorial resulted in Impeachment charges before the U.S. House of Representatives.

Peck was impeached by the United States House of Representatives on April 24, 1830, on a charge of abuse of the contempt power. The United States Senate began his impeachment trial on April 26, 1830, and acquitted him on January 31, 1831, with 21 voting guilty and 22 voting not guilty.

== Sources ==
- Vicente, Jason J. (September 18, 1998). "Impeachment – A Constitutional Primer" (PDF). Cato Institute.
- "Jonathan Turley, Senate Trials And Factional Disputes: Impeachment As A Madisonian Device, 49 Duke L. J. 1 (1999)". March 18, 2006. Archived from the original on March 18, 2006.

Legal offices
New seat	Judge of the United States District Court for the District of Missouri; 1822–1836	Succeeded by Robert William Wells
