= List of Missouri state symbols =

Flag

Seal

Route marker

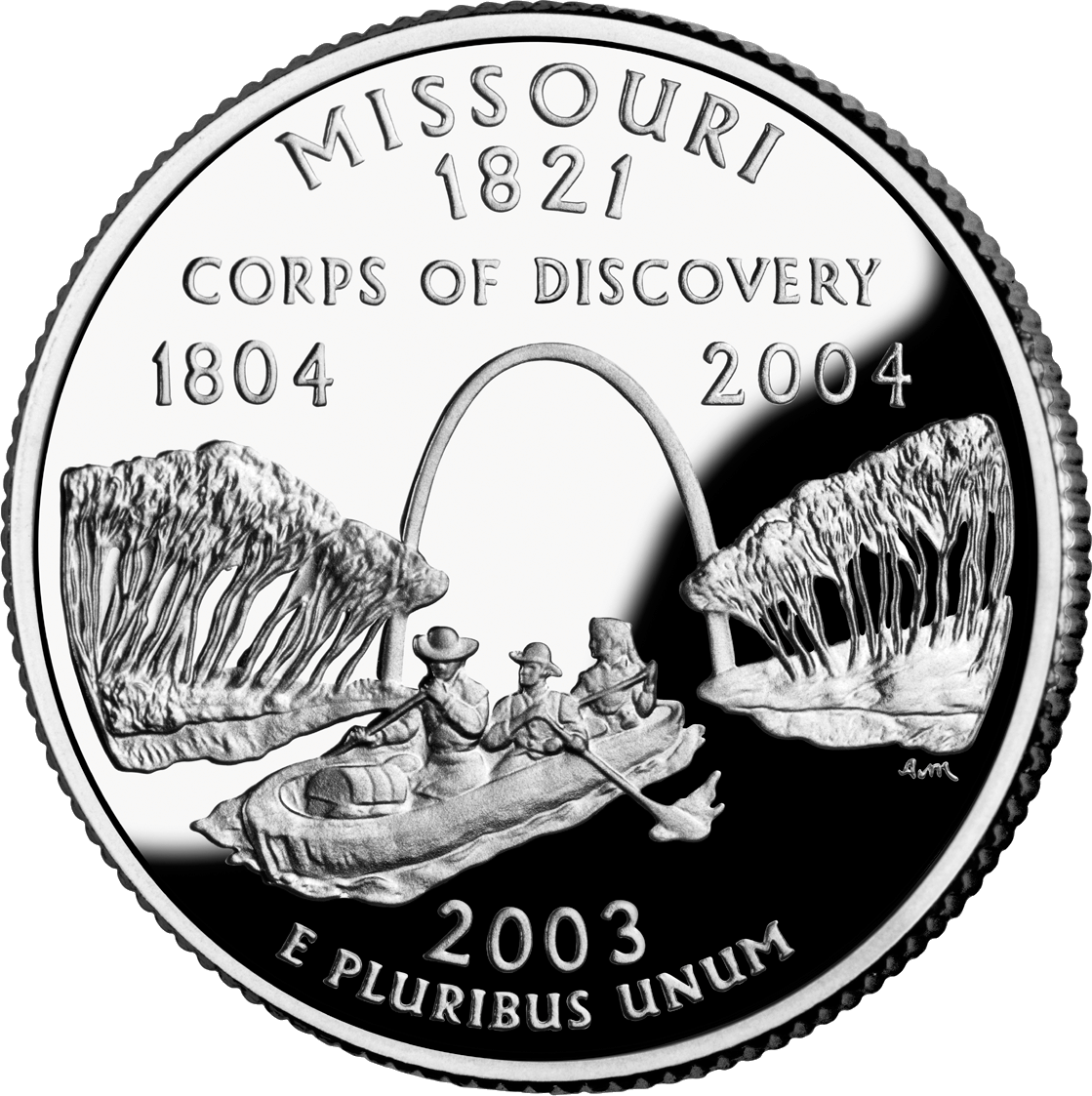
Quarter (released in 2003)

The following is a list of the officially designated symbols of the U.S. state of Missouri.

== State symbols ==
Type	Symbol	Adopted	Image
Amphibian	American bullfrog Lithobates catesbeiana	2005	American bull frog
Animal	Missouri mule	1995	Missouri Governor Warren Hearnes with champion mules at 1969 state fair
Aquatic animal	Paddlefish; Polyodon spathula	1997	Paddlefish
Bird	Bluebird; Sialia sialis	1927 or 1929	Bluebird
Dance	Square dance	1995	Square Dance
Dessert	Ice cream cone	1904	Ice Cream
Dinosaur	Hypsibema missouriensis	2004	
Endangered species	Hellbender salamander Cryptobranchus alleganiensis	2019	Hellbender
Exercise	Jumping jacks	2014	Jumping jacks
Fish	Channel catfish Ictalurus punctatus	1997	Channel Catfish
Flower	Hawthorn (also known as "red haw" or "wild haw"); Crataegus punctata	1923	White Hawthorn
Football team	St. Louis Battlehawks (UFL)	2026	
Fossil	Crinoid; Delocrinus missouriensis	1989	Crinoid
Fruit tree	Pawpaw tree Asimina triloba	2019	Pawpaw tree
Game bird	Bobwhite Quail; Colinus virginianus	2007	Bobwhite Quail
Grape	Norton; Vitis aestivalis	2003	Norton
Grass	Big bluestem Andropogon gerardi	2007	Big Bluestem
Historical dog	Old Drum	2017	
Hockey team	St. Louis Blues (NHL)	2019	
Holiday	Missouri Day (Third Wednesday in October)	1915	Missouri Day is the third Wednesday in October.
Horse	Missouri Fox Trotter; Equus ferus caballus	2002	Missouri Fox Trotter
Insect	Honeybee; Apis mellifera	1985	Honeybee
Invertebrate	Crayfish	2007	Crayfish
Mineral	Galena	1967	Galena
Motto	Salus Populi Suprema Lex Esto (Latin: "Let the welfare of the people be the supreme law.")	1822	A 10-cent Saint Louis postage stamp, 1845-46, bears the state seal and motto.
Musical instrument	Fiddle	1987	Fiddle
Reptile	Three-toed box turtle Terrapene carolina triunguis	2007	Three-toed Box Turtle
Rock	Mozarkite	1967	Mozarkite
Song	"Missouri Waltz"	1949	Missouri Waltz
Tartan	"Missouri Tartan"	2019	Missouri Tartan
Tree	Flowering dogwood Cornus florida	1955	Flowering Dogwood
Tree nut	Eastern black walnut Juglans nigra	1990	Eastern Black Walnut
Wonder dog	Jim the Wonder Dog	2017	

== See also ==
- State of Missouri
- List of Missouri-related topics
- Lists of United States state insignia
