= Robert William Wells =

American judge (1795–1864)

Judge of the United States District Court for the Western District of Missouri
- In office March 3, 1857 – September 22, 1864
- Preceded by: Office established
- Succeeded by: Arnold Krekel

Judge of the United States District Court for the District of Missouri
- In office June 27, 1836 – March 3, 1857
- Nominated by: Andrew Jackson
- Preceded by: James H. Peck
- Succeeded by: Office abolished

3rd Attorney General of Missouri
- In office 1826–1836
- Governor: John Miller; Daniel Dunklin
- Preceded by: Rufus Easton
- Succeeded by: William Barclay Napton

Personal details
- Born: November 29, 1795 Winchester, Virginia, U.S.
- Died: September 22, 1864 (aged 68) Bowling Green, Kentucky, U.S.
- Resting place: Woodland-Old City Cemetery, Jefferson City, Missouri, U.S. 38°34′02.1″N 92°09′45.4″W
- Party: Democratic
- Known for: Seal design

Robert William Wells (November 29, 1795 – September 22, 1864) was an American lawyer and jurist who served as judge of the United States District Court for the Western District of Missouri (1857–1864) and the United States District Court for the District of Missouri (1836–1857). He previously served as the 3rd attorney general of Missouri from 1826 to 1836. Wells is credited with designing the Missouri State Seal.

== Early life and career ==
Born in Winchester, Virginia, Robert William Wells read law to enter the bar in 1820. He was in private practice in St. Charles, Missouri from 1820 to 1821, and was a circuit attorney of the St. Charles Circuit from 1821 to 1822. In 1822, he designed the Missouri State Seal. He was a member of the Missouri House of Representatives from 1823 to 1826. He was the attorney general of Missouri from 1826 to 1836.

== Federal judicial service ==
Wells was nominated by President Andrew Jackson on June 16, 1836, to a seat on the United States District Court for the District of Missouri vacated by Judge James H. Peck. He was confirmed by the United States Senate on June 27, 1836, and received his commission the same day. During this period of his service, Wells presided over Dred Scott v. Sandford on the circuit level, ruling that Scott was a slave under Missouri state law. Wells was reassigned by operation of law to the United States District Court for the Western District of Missouri on March 3, 1857, to a new seat authorized by 11 Stat. 197. His service terminated on September 22, 1864, due to his death in Bowling Green, Kentucky.

== See also ==
- Great Seal of Missouri
- List of attorneys general of Missouri
- List of federal judges appointed by Andrew Jackson

Legal offices
Preceded by Rufus Easton	Attorney General of Missouri; 1826–1836	Succeeded by William Barclay Napton
Preceded by James H. Peck	Judge of the United States District Court for the District of Missouri; 1836–1857	Succeeded by Office abolished
New office	Judge of the United States District Court for the Western District of Missouri; 1857–1864	Succeeded by Arnold Krekel
