= Steve Frank (soccer) =

American soccer player (1948-2024)

Personal information
- Full name: Steven N. Frank
- Date of birth: May 2, 1948
- Place of birth: St. Louis, Missouri, United States
- Date of death: September 8, 2024 (aged 76)
- Place of death: St. Louis, Missouri, United States
- Position: Midfielder

Youth career
- 1966–1969: St. Louis University

Senior career*
Years	Team	Apps	(Gls)
1970–1975	St. Louis Stars	120	(0)
1971	St. Louis Stars (indoor)	2	(0)

International career
1973	United States	1	(0)
- * Club domestic league appearances and goals

Steve Frank (born May 2, 1948 – September 8, 2024) was a U.S. soccer midfielder who spent six seasons in the North American Soccer League. He also earned one cap with the U.S. national team. He was the Executive Vice President and Director of Plancorp, a financial planning and advisory firm.

== Education ==
Frank attended Bishop DuBourg High School, graduating in 1966. He then attended St. Louis University (SLU) where he played on the men's soccer team from 1966 to 1969. During his four seasons with the team, the Billikens won the NCAA Men's Soccer Championship in 1967 and 1969.

He was a second team All-American in 1968 and graduated with a bachelor's degree in commerce in 1970. He went on to earn a J.D. degree from Saint Louis University School of Law in 1973.

== Career ==
=== NASL ===
Frank signed with his hometown St. Louis Stars, of the North American Soccer League in 1970. He played six seasons before retiring from playing professionally following the 1975 season. In 1971 as a member of the Stars, he took part in the league's first ever indoor tournament, scoring no goals and earning two penalty minutes.

=== National team ===
Frank earned one cap with the U.S. national team in a 4–0 loss to Bermuda on March 17, 1973.

== Post-soccer career ==
In 1988, Frank became a partner at Peper, Maring Jensen, Maichel & Hetledge, a legal firm in St. Louis. He then served as vice president, Assistant General Counsel at McDonnell Douglas, an aircraft manufacturing company, from 1994 through 1997. He then held executive positions with Boeing after it acquired McDonnell Douglas in 1997. In 1999, he became the Executive Vice President and Director for Plancorp, a financial planning and advisory firm. He was also the chairman of the board for Bishop DuBourg High School and sat on the St. Louis University Board of Regents. He was inducted into the St. Louis University Athletic Hall of Fame in 1995 and the St. Louis Soccer Hall of Fame in 2001. He died after battling Alzheimer Disease on Sept 8th, 2024.
