= Climate of Missouri =

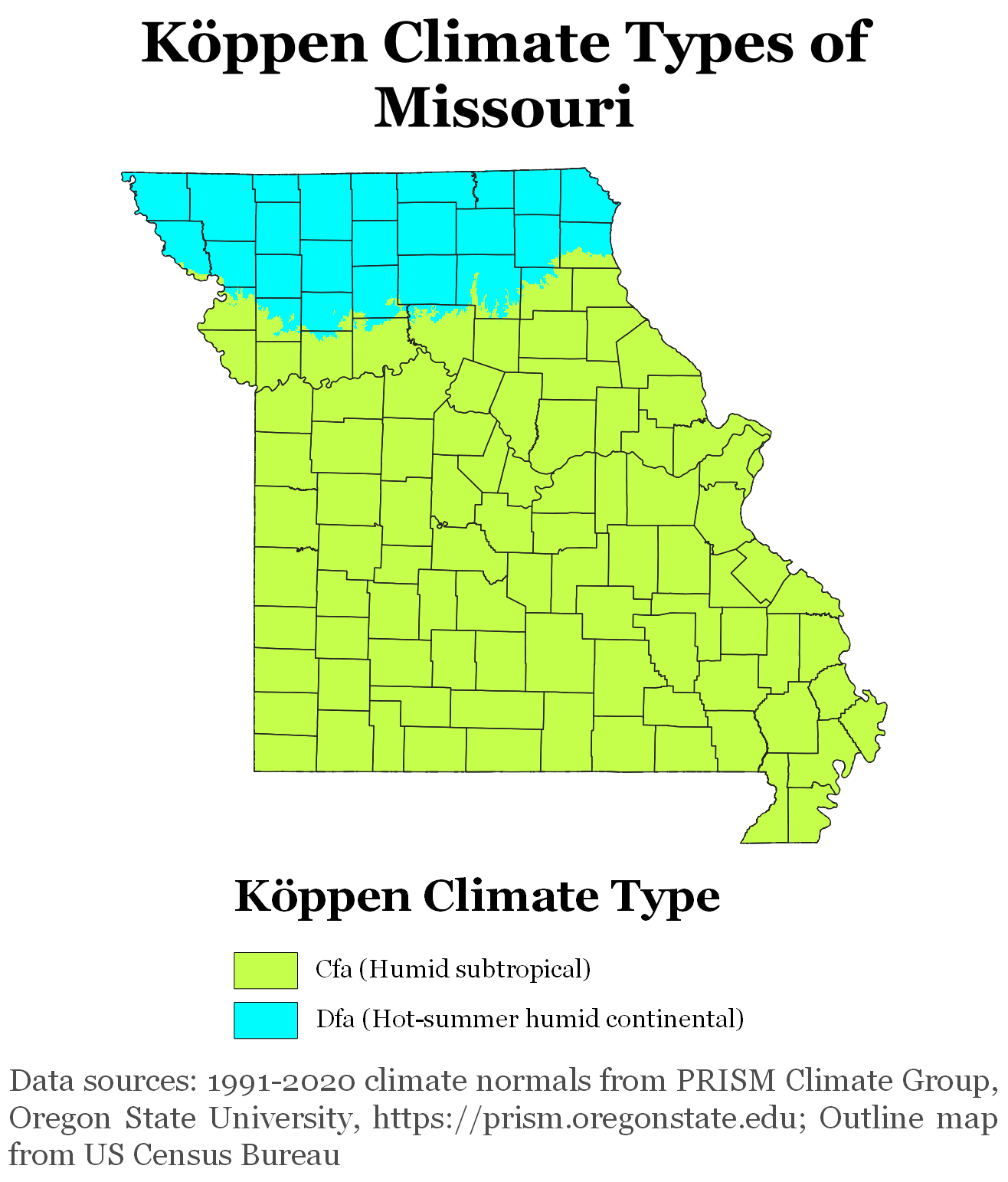
Köppen climate types of Missouri, using 1991-2020 climate normals.

Missouri generally has a variety of seasonal humid subtropical climate (Köppen climate classification Cfa), with cold, unpredictable winters and long, hot summers. In the southern part of the state, particularly in the Bootheel, the climate borders on a more mild-type humid subtropical climate (Köppen Cfa), and in the northern third, the state transitions into a humid continental climate (Köppen Dfa). Because of its location in the interior United States, Missouri often experiences extremes in temperatures. Lacking either large mountains or oceans nearby to moderate its temperature, its climate is alternately influenced by air from the cold Arctic and the hot and humid Gulf of Mexico.

== Overview ==
Climate data for Missouri
Month	Jan	Feb	Mar	Apr	May	Jun	Jul	Aug	Sep	Oct	Nov	Dec	Year
Record high °F (°C)	85 (29)	90 (32)	98 (37)	100 (38)	110 (43)	112 (44)	118 (48)	116 (47)	114 (46)	100 (38)	90 (32)	83 (28)	118 (48)
Mean daily maximum °F (°C)	42.6 (5.9)	47.2 (8.4)	57.7 (14.3)	67.1 (19.5)	76.4 (24.7)	86.7 (30.4)	91.5 (33.1)	89.5 (31.9)	81.9 (27.7)	69.4 (20.8)	55.7 (13.2)	44.5 (6.9)	67.5 (19.7)
Mean daily minimum °F (°C)	19.5 (−6.9)	22.7 (−5.2)	32.0 (0.0)	40.7 (4.8)	51.4 (10.8)	61.7 (16.5)	66.5 (19.2)	64.7 (18.2)	55.8 (13.2)	43.1 (6.2)	30.8 (−0.7)	22.0 (−5.6)	42.6 (5.9)
Record low °F (°C)	−36 (−38)	−40 (−40)	−26 (−32)	2 (−17)	17 (−8)	28 (−2)	38 (3)	35 (2)	17 (−8)	−3 (−19)	−19 (−28)	−36 (−38)	−40 (−40)
Average precipitation inches (mm)	0.7 (18)	1.0 (25)	1.8 (46)	2.7 (69)	4.2 (110)	4.0 (100)	3.9 (99)	3.5 (89)	2.5 (64)	2.3 (58)	1.3 (33)	1.1 (28)	29.0 (740)
Source 1: https://www.extremeweatherwatch.com/states/missouri
Source 2: https://www.factmonster.com/math-science/weather/missouri-temperature-extremes

Mean temperatures and precipitations from 1895 to 2003
Month	Precipitation	Temp
Jan	2.1 in	29.8 °F
Feb	2.0 in	33.8 °F
March	3.3 in	43.5 °F
April	4.0 in	54.6 °F
May	4.8 in	64.2 °F
June	4.65 in	73 °F
July	3.8 in	77.6 °F
Aug	3.7 in	76 °F
Sep	4.0 in	68.3 °F
Oct	3.2 in	57.1 °F
Nov	2.9 in	44 °F
Dec	2.4 in	33.3 °F

While the adjacent table would suggest a very mild climate, a temperature fluctuation of 20 degrees Fahrenheit on average and 30 to 40 degrees Fahrenheit (17 to 22 degrees Celsius) in a twenty-four-hour period is common. Although the mean temperature for June and July is only 73 and 76 °F (23 and 24 °C) it is not uncommon for the temperature to reach 100 °F (38 °C) at least three concurrent days each week in these months, as it did in 1904 during the World Fair where the temperature in St. Louis, Missouri was 103 °F (39 °C).

=== Statistics for selected cities ===
Climate data for Columbia Regional Airport, Missouri (1991–2020 normals, (Note: Mean monthly maxima and minima (i.e. the highest and lowest temperature readings during an entire month or year) calculated based on data at said location from 1991 to 2020.) extremes 1889–present) (Note: Official records for Columbia kept at downtown from August 1889 to December 1947, Columbia Municipal Airport from January 1948 to October 1969 and at Columbia Regional Airport since November 1969.)
Month	Jan	Feb	Mar	Apr	May	Jun	Jul	Aug	Sep	Oct	Nov	Dec	Year
Record high °F (°C)	77 (25)	82 (28)	92 (33)	93 (34)	101 (38)	107 (42)	113 (45)	110 (43)	104 (40)	96 (36)	84 (29)	76 (24)	113 (45)
Mean maximum °F (°C)	63.1 (17.3)	69.9 (21.1)	78.8 (26.0)	84.8 (29.3)	87.9 (31.1)	93.0 (33.9)	97.1 (36.2)	97.8 (36.6)	91.6 (33.1)	85.0 (29.4)	74.0 (23.3)	66.3 (19.1)	99.4 (37.4)
Mean daily maximum °F (°C)	39.5 (4.2)	45.1 (7.3)	56.3 (13.5)	67.2 (19.6)	75.9 (24.4)	84.5 (29.2)	88.5 (31.4)	87.7 (30.9)	80.1 (26.7)	68.2 (20.1)	54.7 (12.6)	43.6 (6.4)	65.9 (18.8)
Daily mean °F (°C)	31.0 (−0.6)	35.7 (2.1)	46.0 (7.8)	56.4 (13.6)	65.8 (18.8)	74.6 (23.7)	78.5 (25.8)	77.2 (25.1)	69.2 (20.7)	57.5 (14.2)	45.3 (7.4)	35.2 (1.8)	56.0 (13.3)
Mean daily minimum °F (°C)	22.5 (−5.3)	26.4 (−3.1)	35.6 (2.0)	45.6 (7.6)	55.7 (13.2)	64.7 (18.2)	68.5 (20.3)	66.7 (19.3)	58.3 (14.6)	46.8 (8.2)	36.0 (2.2)	26.7 (−2.9)	46.1 (7.8)
Mean minimum °F (°C)	0.4 (−17.6)	5.4 (−14.8)	14.7 (−9.6)	28.6 (−1.9)	39.9 (4.4)	52.2 (11.2)	57.9 (14.4)	55.8 (13.2)	42.1 (5.6)	29.2 (−1.6)	17.3 (−8.2)	6.7 (−14.1)	−3.4 (−19.7)
Record low °F (°C)	−20 (−29)	−26 (−32)	−9 (−23)	14 (−10)	28 (−2)	40 (4)	45 (7)	40 (4)	26 (−3)	19 (−7)	−3 (−19)	−23 (−31)	−26 (−32)
Average precipitation inches (mm)	2.12 (54)	2.12 (54)	2.97 (75)	4.88 (124)	4.77 (121)	4.23 (107)	4.13 (105)	4.14 (105)	3.83 (97)	3.47 (88)	2.68 (68)	2.09 (53)	41.43 (1,052)
Average snowfall inches (cm)	6.0 (15)	4.6 (12)	1.5 (3.8)	0.2 (0.51)	0.0 (0.0)	0.0 (0.0)	0.0 (0.0)	0.0 (0.0)	0.0 (0.0)	0.0 (0.0)	0.8 (2.0)	3.4 (8.6)	16.5 (42)
Average extreme snow depth inches (cm)	3.7 (9.4)	3.2 (8.1)	1.3 (3.3)	0.0 (0.0)	0.0 (0.0)	0.0 (0.0)	0.0 (0.0)	0.0 (0.0)	0.0 (0.0)	0.0 (0.0)	0.4 (1.0)	2.1 (5.3)	6.2 (16)
Average precipitation days (≥ 0.01 in)	8.2	8.3	11.1	11.3	12.6	9.3	8.8	8.5	7.3	9.1	8.5	7.8	110.8
Average rainy days	6.8	7.8	12.4	14.0	15.0	12.1	10.4	11.3	11.4	12.1	11.0	10.2	134.5
Average snowy days (≥ 0.1 in)	3.6	2.8	1.1	0.2	0.0	0.0	0.0	0.0	0.0	0.1	0.8	2.1	10.7
Average relative humidity (%)	71.2	71.5	67.3	63.9	70.9	71.3	69.5	70.8	71.7	69.4	71.8	74.0	70.3
Average dew point °F (°C)	18.3 (−7.6)	22.8 (−5.1)	32.0 (0.0)	41.2 (5.1)	52.7 (11.5)	61.9 (16.6)	65.7 (18.7)	63.9 (17.7)	57.0 (13.9)	44.4 (6.9)	34.0 (1.1)	23.7 (−4.6)	43.1 (6.2)
Mean monthly sunshine hours	161.5	154.3	193.5	226.9	264.1	294.1	313.4	288.5	229.1	210.7	150.6	140.3	2,627
Percentage possible sunshine	53	51	52	57	60	66	69	68	61	61	50	48	59
Average ultraviolet index	2	3	5	7	8	9	10	9	7	4	3	2	6
Source 1: NOAA (rain/drizzle days, relative humidity and dew point 1969–1990, sun 1961–1990)
Source 2: Weather Atlas (UV)

Climate data for Kansas City, Missouri (Downtown Airport), 1991–2020 normals, (Note: Mean monthly maxima and minima (i.e. the expected highest and lowest temperature readings at any point during the year or given month) calculated based on data at said location from 1991 to 2020.) extremes 1934–present)
Month	Jan	Feb	Mar	Apr	May	Jun	Jul	Aug	Sep	Oct	Nov	Dec	Year
Record high °F (°C)	76 (24)	83 (28)	89 (32)	94 (34)	103 (39)	108 (42)	112 (44)	113 (45)	109 (43)	98 (37)	83 (28)	75 (24)	113 (45)
Mean maximum °F (°C)	62.9 (17.2)	68.4 (20.2)	78.6 (25.9)	84.3 (29.1)	90.1 (32.3)	95.4 (35.2)	100.0 (37.8)	99.9 (37.7)	93.8 (34.3)	86.0 (30.0)	73.5 (23.1)	65.2 (18.4)	101.7 (38.7)
Mean daily maximum °F (°C)	39.9 (4.4)	45.1 (7.3)	56.6 (13.7)	66.8 (19.3)	76.2 (24.6)	85.8 (29.9)	90.2 (32.3)	88.6 (31.4)	80.4 (26.9)	68.2 (20.1)	54.5 (12.5)	43.9 (6.6)	66.3 (19.1)
Daily mean °F (°C)	31.0 (−0.6)	35.8 (2.1)	46.4 (8.0)	56.5 (13.6)	66.7 (19.3)	76.5 (24.7)	81.0 (27.2)	79.2 (26.2)	70.7 (21.5)	58.4 (14.7)	45.4 (7.4)	35.3 (1.8)	56.9 (13.8)
Mean daily minimum °F (°C)	22.2 (−5.4)	26.4 (−3.1)	36.2 (2.3)	46.3 (7.9)	57.2 (14.0)	67.2 (19.6)	71.9 (22.2)	69.9 (21.1)	61.0 (16.1)	48.7 (9.3)	36.3 (2.4)	26.7 (−2.9)	47.5 (8.6)
Mean minimum °F (°C)	2.7 (−16.3)	8.4 (−13.1)	16.4 (−8.7)	31.0 (−0.6)	42.6 (5.9)	55.1 (12.8)	62.4 (16.9)	60.1 (15.6)	46.4 (8.0)	32.4 (0.2)	19.7 (−6.8)	8.2 (−13.2)	−0.7 (−18.2)
Record low °F (°C)	−14 (−26)	−13 (−25)	−3 (−19)	16 (−9)	32 (0)	44 (7)	52 (11)	48 (9)	34 (1)	21 (−6)	5 (−15)	−19 (−28)	−19 (−28)
Average precipitation inches (mm)	1.02 (26)	1.53 (39)	2.08 (53)	3.89 (99)	5.10 (130)	5.33 (135)	4.38 (111)	4.68 (119)	3.78 (96)	3.24 (82)	1.80 (46)	1.30 (33)	38.13 (969)
Average snowfall inches (cm)	3.4 (8.6)	3.2 (8.1)	0.4 (1.0)	0.1 (0.25)	0.0 (0.0)	0.0 (0.0)	0.0 (0.0)	0.0 (0.0)	0.0 (0.0)	0.3 (0.76)	0.1 (0.25)	3.5 (8.9)	11.0 (28)
Average precipitation days (≥ 0.01 in)	4.6	4.8	6.8	9.3	11.0	9.5	7.9	7.8	7.6	7.0	5.2	4.6	86.1
Average snowy days (≥ 0.1 in)	2.2	1.6	0.4	0.1	0.0	0.0	0.0	0.0	0.0	0.1	0.1	1.9	6.4
Source: NOAA

Climate data for Kansas City Int'l, Missouri (1991–2020 normals, extremes 1888–present) (Note: Official records for Kansas City kept at downtown/Weather Bureau Office from July 1888 to December 1933; Downtown Airport from January 1934 to September 1972; and Kansas City Int'l since October 1972. For more information see ThreadEx.)
Month	Jan	Feb	Mar	Apr	May	Jun	Jul	Aug	Sep	Oct	Nov	Dec	Year
Record high °F (°C)	75 (24)	83 (28)	91 (33)	95 (35)	103 (39)	108 (42)	112 (44)	113 (45)	109 (43)	98 (37)	83 (28)	74 (23)	113 (45)
Mean maximum °F (°C)	62.0 (16.7)	67.5 (19.7)	78.8 (26.0)	84.5 (29.2)	88.9 (31.6)	93.5 (34.2)	97.9 (36.6)	98.1 (36.7)	92.6 (33.7)	85.9 (29.9)	72.6 (22.6)	64.3 (17.9)	99.7 (37.6)
Mean daily maximum °F (°C)	38.4 (3.6)	43.6 (6.4)	55.4 (13.0)	65.5 (18.6)	75.0 (23.9)	84.2 (29.0)	88.3 (31.3)	87.1 (30.6)	79.2 (26.2)	67.2 (19.6)	53.5 (11.9)	42.3 (5.7)	65.0 (18.3)
Daily mean °F (°C)	29.0 (−1.7)	33.6 (0.9)	44.5 (6.9)	54.6 (12.6)	64.6 (18.1)	74.1 (23.4)	78.2 (25.7)	76.7 (24.8)	68.4 (20.2)	56.4 (13.6)	43.6 (6.4)	33.1 (0.6)	54.7 (12.6)
Mean daily minimum °F (°C)	19.5 (−6.9)	23.6 (−4.7)	33.6 (0.9)	43.7 (6.5)	54.3 (12.4)	64.0 (17.8)	68.1 (20.1)	66.3 (19.1)	57.5 (14.2)	45.6 (7.6)	33.6 (0.9)	23.9 (−4.5)	44.5 (6.9)
Mean minimum °F (°C)	−1.5 (−18.6)	4.3 (−15.4)	13.3 (−10.4)	27.8 (−2.3)	39.4 (4.1)	51.6 (10.9)	58.3 (14.6)	56.0 (13.3)	41.9 (5.5)	28.5 (−1.9)	16.3 (−8.7)	4.4 (−15.3)	−5.2 (−20.7)
Record low °F (°C)	−20 (−29)	−22 (−30)	−10 (−23)	12 (−11)	27 (−3)	42 (6)	51 (11)	43 (6)	31 (−1)	17 (−8)	1 (−17)	−23 (−31)	−23 (−31)
Average precipitation inches (mm)	1.16 (29)	1.48 (38)	2.36 (60)	4.05 (103)	5.32 (135)	5.25 (133)	4.58 (116)	4.24 (108)	4.04 (103)	3.25 (83)	2.00 (51)	1.57 (40)	39.30 (998)
Average snowfall inches (cm)	4.9 (12)	5.9 (15)	1.7 (4.3)	0.3 (0.76)	0.0 (0.0)	0.0 (0.0)	0.0 (0.0)	0.0 (0.0)	0.0 (0.0)	0.3 (0.76)	1.1 (2.8)	4.0 (10)	18.2 (46)
Average extreme snow depth inches (cm)	3.2 (8.1)	3.4 (8.6)	1.9 (4.8)	0.1 (0.25)	0.0 (0.0)	0.0 (0.0)	0.0 (0.0)	0.0 (0.0)	0.0 (0.0)	0.1 (0.25)	0.6 (1.5)	2.4 (6.1)	5.3 (13)
Average precipitation days (≥ 0.01 in)	6.8	6.7	9.5	11.3	12.1	10.2	9.0	8.4	8.3	8.1	6.8	6.5	103.7
Average snowy days (≥ 0.1 in)	4.4	3.1	1.7	0.4	0.0	0.0	0.0	0.0	0.0	0.2	1.0	3.0	13.8
Average relative humidity (%)	68.8	69.6	66.7	62.9	68.0	69.2	67.4	70.0	70.4	67.1	69.7	71.0	68.4
Average dew point °F (°C)	16.5 (−8.6)	21.4 (−5.9)	31.6 (−0.2)	40.6 (4.8)	52.0 (11.1)	61.5 (16.4)	65.8 (18.8)	64.4 (18.0)	56.7 (13.7)	43.5 (6.4)	32.5 (0.3)	21.0 (−6.1)	42.3 (5.7)
Mean monthly sunshine hours	183.7	174.3	223.9	257.8	285.0	305.5	329.3	293.9	240.5	213.6	155.3	147.1	2,809.9
Percentage possible sunshine	61	58	60	65	64	68	74	69	64	62	52	50	63
Average ultraviolet index	2	3	5	7	8	9	10	9	7	4	3	2	6
Source: NOAA (relative humidity, dew point, and sun 1972–1990)

Climate data for St. Louis, Missouri (Lambert–St. Louis Int'l), 1991–2020 normals, (Note: Mean monthly maxima and minima (i.e. the highest and lowest temperature readings during an entire month or year) calculated based on data at said location from 1991 to 2020.) extremes 1874–present (Note: Official records for St. Louis were kept at the Weather Bureau Office from January 1874 to December 1892, Eads Bridge from January 1893 to December 1929, and at Lambert–St. Louis Int'l since January 1930.)
Month	Jan	Feb	Mar	Apr	May	Jun	Jul	Aug	Sep	Oct	Nov	Dec	Year
Record high °F (°C)	77 (25)	85 (29)	92 (33)	93 (34)	98 (37)	108 (42)	115 (46)	110 (43)	104 (40)	94 (34)	86 (30)	78 (26)	115 (46)
Mean maximum °F (°C)	64.7 (18.2)	71.0 (21.7)	79.4 (26.3)	86.4 (30.2)	90.4 (32.4)	95.5 (35.3)	99.2 (37.3)	99.1 (37.3)	93.4 (34.1)	87.0 (30.6)	75.5 (24.2)	66.9 (19.4)	100.7 (38.2)
Mean daily maximum °F (°C)	40.4 (4.7)	45.8 (7.7)	56.6 (13.7)	68.0 (20.0)	77.1 (25.1)	85.9 (29.9)	89.6 (32.0)	88.3 (31.3)	81.1 (27.3)	69.2 (20.7)	55.5 (13.1)	44.5 (6.9)	66.8 (19.3)
Daily mean °F (°C)	32.1 (0.1)	36.7 (2.6)	46.6 (8.1)	57.5 (14.2)	67.5 (19.7)	76.5 (24.7)	80.4 (26.9)	78.8 (26.0)	71.0 (21.7)	59.1 (15.1)	46.5 (8.1)	36.5 (2.5)	57.4 (14.1)
Mean daily minimum °F (°C)	23.8 (−4.6)	27.6 (−2.4)	36.7 (2.6)	47.0 (8.3)	57.9 (14.4)	67.2 (19.6)	71.1 (21.7)	69.3 (20.7)	60.9 (16.1)	49.1 (9.5)	37.4 (3.0)	28.5 (−1.9)	48.0 (8.9)
Mean minimum °F (°C)	4.4 (−15.3)	9.6 (−12.4)	17.8 (−7.9)	32.2 (0.1)	43.5 (6.4)	55.5 (13.1)	61.4 (16.3)	60.1 (15.6)	47.1 (8.4)	33.6 (0.9)	22.0 (−5.6)	11.0 (−11.7)	1.2 (−17.1)
Record low °F (°C)	−22 (−30)	−18 (−28)	−5 (−21)	20 (−7)	31 (−1)	43 (6)	51 (11)	47 (8)	32 (0)	21 (−6)	1 (−17)	−16 (−27)	−22 (−30)
Average precipitation inches (mm)	2.59 (66)	2.23 (57)	3.50 (89)	4.73 (120)	4.82 (122)	4.49 (114)	3.93 (100)	3.38 (86)	2.96 (75)	3.15 (80)	3.42 (87)	2.50 (64)	41.70 (1,059)
Average snowfall inches (cm)	5.7 (14)	4.3 (11)	2.3 (5.8)	0.2 (0.51)	0.0 (0.0)	0.0 (0.0)	0.0 (0.0)	0.0 (0.0)	0.0 (0.0)	0.0 (0.0)	0.9 (2.3)	3.2 (8.1)	16.6 (42)
Average precipitation days (≥ 0.01 in)	9.3	8.7	10.8	11.5	12.6	9.8	8.9	8.4	7.3	8.5	9.0	9.0	113.8
Average snowy days (≥ 0.1 in)	4.7	3.9	1.7	0.2	0.0	0.0	0.0	0.0	0.0	0.0	0.8	3.2	14.5
Average relative humidity (%)	73.0	72.0	68.3	63.5	66.5	67.1	68.0	70.0	71.6	68.7	72.2	75.8	69.7
Average dew point °F (°C)	20.1 (−6.6)	24.1 (−4.4)	33.1 (0.6)	42.3 (5.7)	52.9 (11.6)	62.1 (16.7)	66.6 (19.2)	65.1 (18.4)	58.6 (14.8)	46.0 (7.8)	36.0 (2.2)	25.5 (−3.6)	44.4 (6.9)
Mean monthly sunshine hours	161.2	158.3	198.3	223.5	266.5	291.9	308.9	269.8	236.1	208.4	140.9	129.9	2,593.7
Percentage possible sunshine	53	53	53	56	60	66	68	64	63	60	47	44	58
Average ultraviolet index	1.7	2.7	4.5	6.4	7.9	9.0	9.1	8.2	6.3	4.0	2.3	—	—
Source 1: NOAA (relative humidity, dew point, and sun 1961−1990)
Source 2: UV Index Today (1995 to 2022)

Climate data for Springfield–Branson National Airport, Missouri (1991−2020 normals, (Note: Mean monthly maxima and minima (i.e. the highest and lowest temperature readings during an entire month or year) calculated based on data at said location from 1991 to 2020.) extremes 1888−present (Note: Official records for Springfield were kept at downtown from January 1888 to December 1939, Downtown Airport from January 1940 to July 1940, and at Springfield–Branson National Airport since August 1940. For more information, see ThreadEx.))
Month	Jan	Feb	Mar	Apr	May	Jun	Jul	Aug	Sep	Oct	Nov	Dec	Year
Record high °F (°C)	76 (24)	84 (29)	92 (33)	93 (34)	95 (35)	101 (38)	113 (45)	108 (42)	104 (40)	93 (34)	83 (28)	77 (25)	113 (45)
Mean maximum °F (°C)	66.8 (19.3)	72.0 (22.2)	78.9 (26.1)	83.5 (28.6)	87.4 (30.8)	92.5 (33.6)	96.8 (36.0)	98.2 (36.8)	92.6 (33.7)	85.0 (29.4)	74.7 (23.7)	67.4 (19.7)	99.1 (37.3)
Mean daily maximum °F (°C)	44.3 (6.8)	49.5 (9.7)	58.9 (14.9)	68.4 (20.2)	76.3 (24.6)	85.2 (29.6)	89.6 (32.0)	89.1 (31.7)	81.4 (27.4)	69.9 (21.1)	57.3 (14.1)	47.0 (8.3)	68.1 (20.1)
Daily mean °F (°C)	34.3 (1.3)	38.7 (3.7)	47.6 (8.7)	57.0 (13.9)	66.0 (18.9)	74.9 (23.8)	79.2 (26.2)	78.2 (25.7)	70.3 (21.3)	58.6 (14.8)	46.7 (8.2)	37.4 (3.0)	57.4 (14.1)
Mean daily minimum °F (°C)	24.2 (−4.3)	28.0 (−2.2)	36.2 (2.3)	45.6 (7.6)	55.6 (13.1)	64.6 (18.1)	68.8 (20.4)	67.3 (19.6)	59.1 (15.1)	47.3 (8.5)	36.2 (2.3)	27.8 (−2.3)	46.7 (8.2)
Mean minimum °F (°C)	3.5 (−15.8)	8.4 (−13.1)	15.9 (−8.9)	28.1 (−2.2)	38.9 (3.8)	51.8 (11.0)	58.3 (14.6)	55.5 (13.1)	42.7 (5.9)	29.3 (−1.5)	18.1 (−7.7)	8.1 (−13.3)	−1.0 (−18.3)
Record low °F (°C)	−19 (−28)	−29 (−34)	−8 (−22)	16 (−9)	29 (−2)	42 (6)	44 (7)	44 (7)	30 (−1)	18 (−8)	4 (−16)	−16 (−27)	−29 (−34)
Average precipitation inches (mm)	2.54 (65)	2.40 (61)	3.51 (89)	4.71 (120)	5.56 (141)	4.47 (114)	3.85 (98)	3.59 (91)	4.31 (109)	3.60 (91)	3.56 (90)	2.61 (66)	44.71 (1,136)
Average snowfall inches (cm)	4.4 (11)	3.3 (8.4)	2.0 (5.1)	0.1 (0.25)	0.0 (0.0)	0.0 (0.0)	0.0 (0.0)	0.0 (0.0)	0.0 (0.0)	0.0 (0.0)	0.6 (1.5)	3.3 (8.4)	13.7 (35)
Average precipitation days (≥ 0.01 in)	8.1	7.7	10.7	10.8	12.4	10.2	8.8	8.3	7.4	9.0	8.6	8.0	110.0
Average snowy days (≥ 0.1 in)	3.4	2.5	1.2	0.1	0.0	0.0	0.0	0.0	0.0	0.1	0.7	2.2	10.2
Average relative humidity (%)	68.3	68.5	65.2	64.5	70.7	72.3	70.4	69.5	72.9	68.2	69.6	70.9	69.3
Average dew point °F (°C)	20.8 (−6.2)	25.0 (−3.9)	33.1 (0.6)	43.0 (6.1)	53.8 (12.1)	62.4 (16.9)	65.8 (18.8)	63.9 (17.7)	58.1 (14.5)	45.3 (7.4)	35.1 (1.7)	25.5 (−3.6)	44.3 (6.8)
Mean monthly sunshine hours	167.6	157.4	208.7	236.4	268.0	282.7	321.6	292.1	237.6	217.3	155.1	145.9	2,690.4
Percentage possible sunshine	54	52	56	60	61	64	72	70	64	62	51	49	60
Source: NOAA (relative humidity, dew point, and sun 1961−1990)

== Spring ==
Spring is generally the wettest season of the year, with the mean temperature from 1895 until 2003 being about 12 °C (54 °F) and its mean precipitation (in the form of rain) for this period being approximately 300 mm (12 in). April through June is generally the wettest period. The spring also produces the most tornadoes, with an average of 35 tornadoes each year.

== Summer ==
Summer, June through August, is the hottest time of the year with a mean temperature of 36 °C (97 °F) and a mean precipitation of 300 mm (12 in) with June having more precipitation than either July or August. The extreme highs for the year often occur in July or August. Tropical cyclones and their remains can impact the state during this time of the year, contributing to area rainfall.

== Autumn ==
Fall, September through November, has less and less precipitation towards the end of the season. The mean temperatures for this season are 13.6 °C (56.5 °F) and the mean precipitation is 250 mm (9.8 in). Tropical cyclones and their remains can impact the state into October, contributing to area rainfall.

== Winter ==
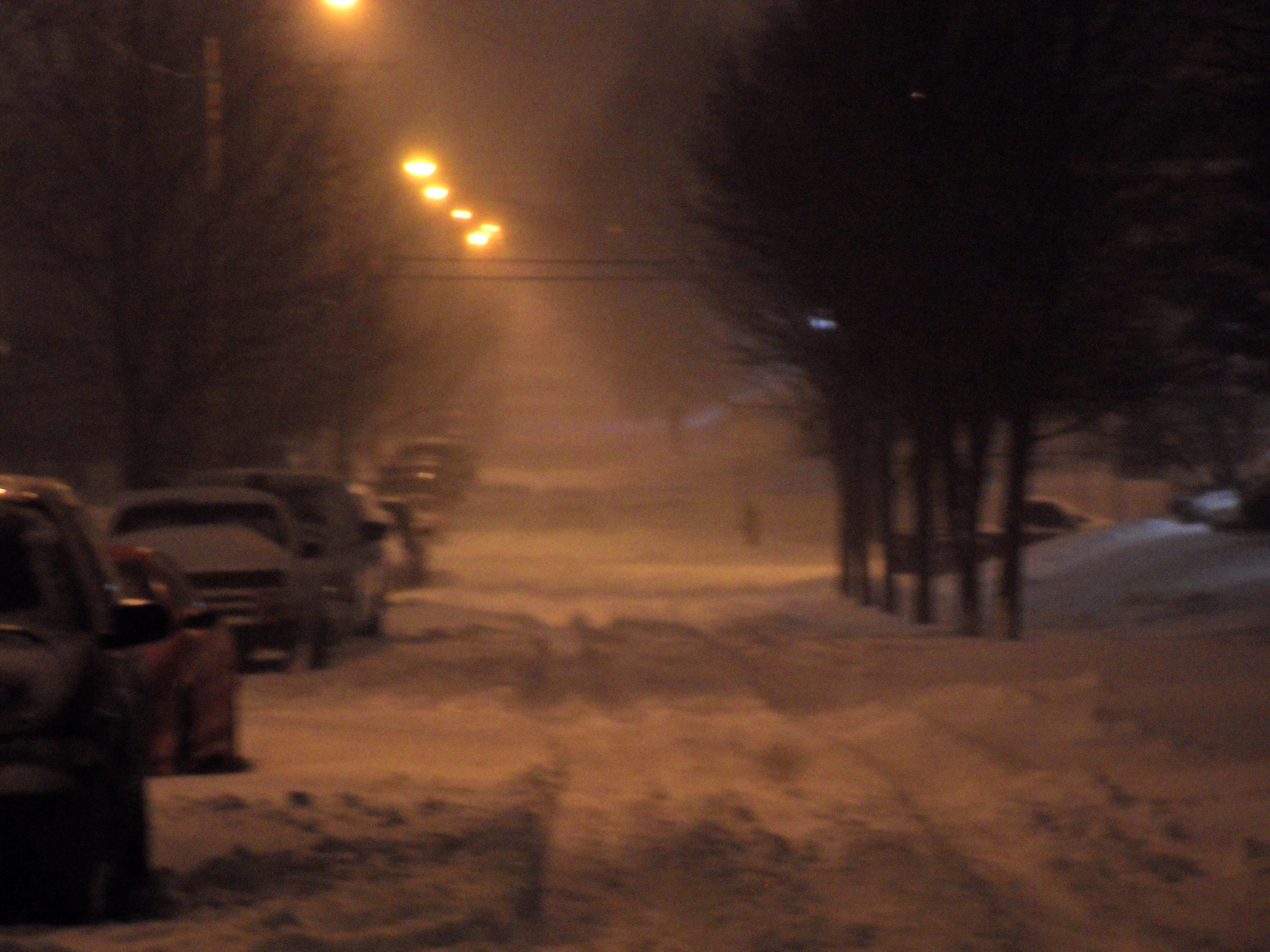
Blizzard in Kansas City.

Winters in Missouri can be long with temperatures ranging from mildly to bitterly cold. Kansas City's January daily mean temperature is 26 °F (−3 °C) and St. Louis's is 29 °F (−2 °C). The coldest temperature ever recorded in Missouri was −40 °F (−40 °C), set at Warsaw on 13 February 1905. Winter also tends to be the driest season, but typically yields significant amounts of winter precipitation. Snowfall averages 20 inches (51 cm) in the state's northern region, and 10 inches (25 cm) in the southeast. During the winter, northwest winds prevail; the air movement is largely from the south and southeast during the rest of the year.

== See also ==
- Climate
- Climate change in Missouri
- Climatology
- List of wettest known tropical cyclones, and their remnants, across Missouri
- St. Louis tornado history
