= Grand Divide =

Geographic region in northern Missouri, U.S.

Coordinates: 39°59′20″N 92°28′34″W

The Grand Divide is an indistinct ridge in northern Missouri, between the Iowa border and Moberly, that separates the watersheds of the Missouri River and Mississippi River. This ridge and numerous major streams in the northern part of the state follow a rather linear north–south orientation, related to glaciation. The ridge was used as a pioneer road called the Bee Trace, the St. Louis, Kansas City and Northern Railroad, and currently U.S. Highway 63.
