= Missourians for Equality =

American political action committee

- Founded: July 2012
- Type: 501c4
- Location: Columbia, Missouri
- Region served: Missouri
- Key people: Allison Levin, Jake Lyonfields, Caleb-Michael Files, George Koors, Aaron Malin
- Employees: 5
- Website: equalitymo.org
- Formerly called: Missourians for Equality

Missourians for Equality is a nonpartisan political action committee founded in July 2012 and dedicated to ending LGBT discrimination in Missouri. The organization is based in Columbia, Missouri.

In December 2012, the organization was approved to circulate an initiative petition reforming anti-discrimination laws in the state of Missouri. Under current state law, discrimination based on sexual orientation and gender identity in employment and housing is not prohibited. However, the proposed ballot measure would change state anti-discrimination law to include discrimination against these groups, with an exception provided for religious organizations. If approved, this measure will appear on the 2014 ballot.
