= Climate change in Missouri =

Climate change in the US state of Missouri

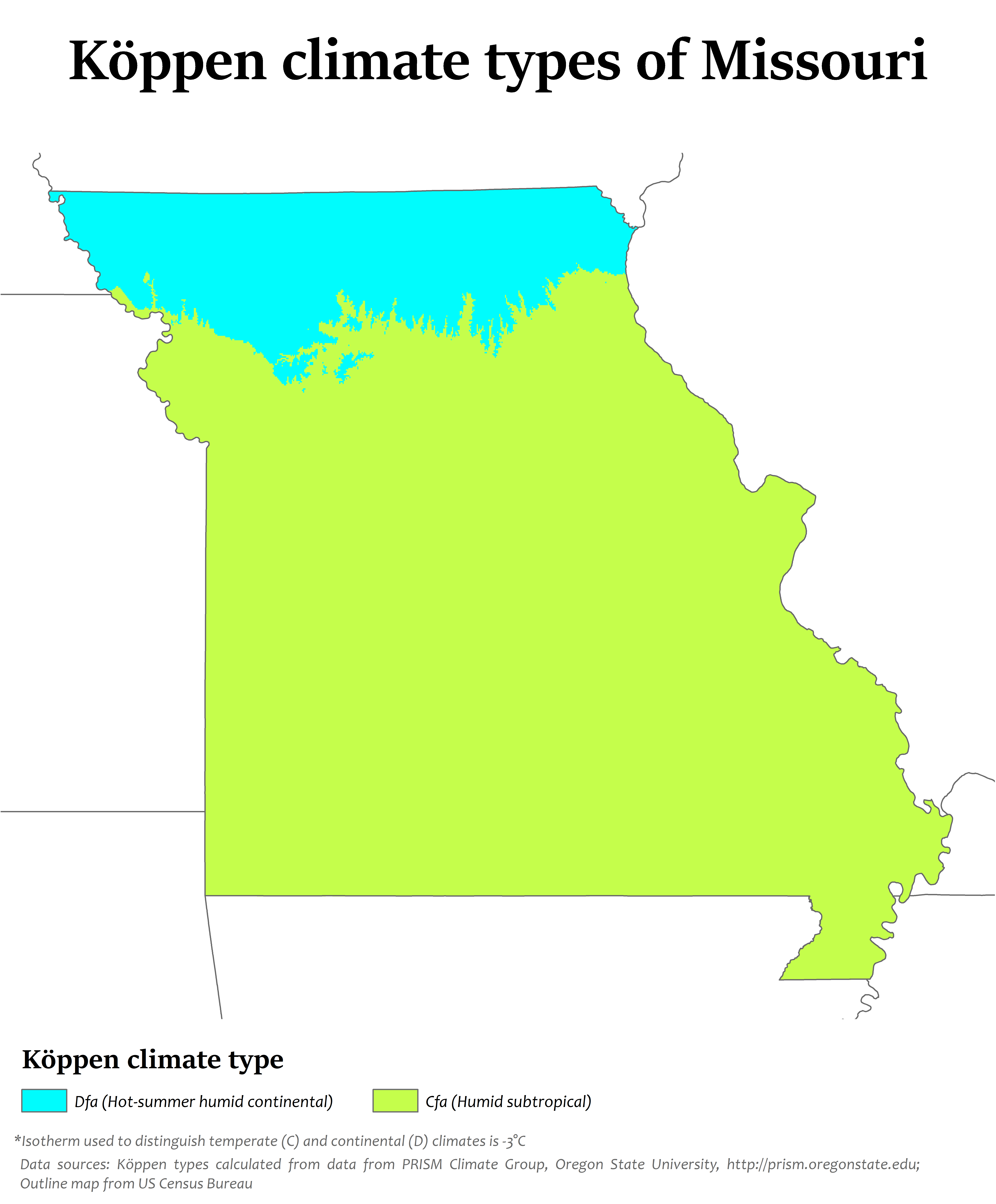
Köppen climate types in Missouri, showing that the state is now largely humid subtropical, with a hot-summer humid continental zone in the northern part.

Climate change in Missouri encompasses the effects of climate change, attributed to man-made increases in atmospheric carbon dioxide, in the U.S. state of Missouri.

The United States Environmental Protection Agency reports that "Missouri's climate is changing. Most of the state has warmed one-half to one degree (F) in the last century, Severe weather and floods are becoming more frequent. In the coming decades, the state will have more extremely hot days, which may harm public health in urban areas and corn harvests in rural areas". In 2015, The Washington Post reported that "by the end of the century, temperatures in Missouri could be a lot like they are in Arizona right now — with between 46 and 115 days above 95 degrees per year".

== Heavy precipitation and flooding ==
"Changing the climate is likely to increase the frequency of floods in Missouri. Over the last half century, average annual precipitation in most of the Midwest has increased by 5 to 10 percent. But rainfall during the four wettest days of the year has increased about 35 percent, and the amount of water flowing in most streams during the worst flood of the year has increased by more than 20 percent. During the next century, spring rainfall and average precipitation are likely to increase, and severe rainstorms are likely to intensify. Each of these factors will tend to further increase the risk of flooding".

== Mississippi and Missouri Rivers ==
"Flooding occasionally threatens navigation and riverfront communities, and greater river flows could increase these threats. In April and May 2011, a combination of heavy rainfall and melting snow caused a flood that closed the Mississippi River to navigation, threatened Caruthersville, and prompted evacuation of Cairo, Illinois, due to concerns that its flood protection levees might fail. To protect Cairo, the U.S. Army Corps of Engineers opened the Birds Point-New Madrid Floodway, which lowered the river by flooding more than 100,000 acres of farmland in Missouri. Later that spring, heavy rains and rapid snowmelt upstream led to flooding along the Missouri River, which damaged property and closed the river to navigation.

Although springtime in Missouri is likely to be wetter, summer droughts are likely to be more severe. Higher evaporation and lower summer rainfall are likely to reduce river flows. The drought of 2012 narrowed navigation channels, forced lock closures, and caused dozens of barges to run aground on the Mississippi River along the Missouri shoreline. The resulting impact on navigation cost the region more than $275 million. The drought of 2012–2013 also threatened municipal and industrial water users along the Missouri River".

== Tornadoes ==
"Scientists do not know how the frequency and severity of tornadoes will change. Increasing concentrations of greenhouse gases tend to increase humidity, and thus, atmospheric instability, which would encourage tornadoes. But wind shear is likely to decrease, which would discourage tornadoes. Research is ongoing to learn whether tornadoes will be more or less frequent in the future. Because Missouri experiences about 50 tornadoes a year, such research is closely followed by meteorologists in the state".

In May 2019, The Kansas City Star noted that although it was not yet possible to say whether climate change was contributing to the increasing number of tornadoes in the region, "the band of states in the central United States ... that each spring are ravaged by hundreds of tornadoes — is not disappearing. But it seems to be expanding", resulting in a higher frequency of tornadoes in regions including eastern Missouri.

== Forests ==
"Higher temperatures and changes in rainfall are unlikely to substantially reduce forest cover in Missouri, although the composition of trees in the forests may change. More droughts would reduce forest productivity, and climate change is also likely to increase the damage from insects and diseases. But longer growing seasons and increased carbon dioxide concentrations could more than offset the losses from those factors. Forests cover about one-third of the state, dominated by oak and hickory trees. As the climate changes, the abundance of pines in Missouri's forests is likely to increase, while the population of hickory trees is likely to decrease".

== Agriculture ==
"Changing the climate will have both harmful and beneficial effects on farming. Seventy years from now, Missouri is likely to have more than 25 days per year with temperatures above 95°F, compared with 5 to 15 today. Hot weather causes cows to eat less, produce less milk, and grow more slowly—and it could threaten their health. Even during the next few decades, hotter summers are likely to reduce yields of corn. But higher concentrations of atmospheric carbon dioxide increase crop yields, and that fertilizing effect is likely to offset the harmful effects of heat on soybeans, assuming that adequate water is available. On farms without irrigation, however, increasingly severe droughts could cause more crop failures. More severe droughts or floods would also hurt crop yields".

== See also ==
- Plug-in electric vehicles in Missouri
