= Plug-in electric vehicles in Missouri =

As of 2022, there were 6,740 electric vehicles in Missouri, equivalent to 0.12% of all vehicles in the state.

== Government policy ==
As of 2022, the state government charges a $90 registration fee for electric vehicles. This fee is scheduled to increase by 20% per year until 2026.

== Charging stations ==
As of 2022, there were 985 charging stations in Missouri.

The Infrastructure Investment and Jobs Act, signed into law in November 2021, allocates US$99 million to charging stations in Missouri.

== By region ==
=== Columbia ===
As of 2016, there were 18 electric vehicles registered in Columbia. As of 2021, there were 25 charging stations in the city.

=== Jefferson City ===
As of May 2022, there were 75 electric vehicles registered in Cole County.

As of May 2022, there were 9 charging station locations in Cole County.

=== Kansas City ===
As of September 2021, the Kansas City government is prohibited from purchasing new gasoline-powered vehicles.

=== St. Louis ===
As of March 2022, St. Louis and St. Louis County have passed ordinances requiring a certain percentage of new parking spaces constructed to have electric vehicle charging infrastructure installed.
