= Drug policy of Missouri =

Overview of the drug policy of the U.S. state of Missouri

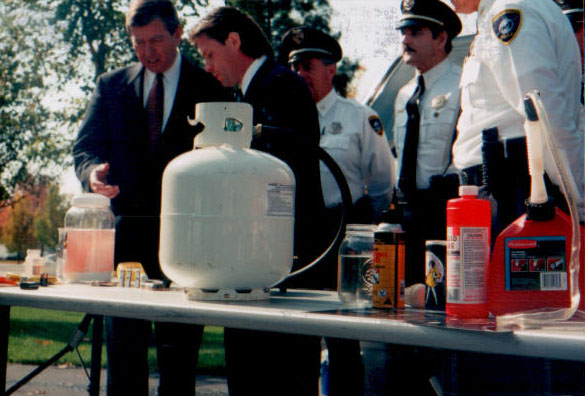
Former United States senator, John Ashcroft, meeting with Missouri law enforcement to speak about the "Missouri meth crisis", 2000

The drug policy of Missouri involves the policies, measures and laws set by the government of Missouri to control substance distribution and abuse.

== Legal measures against drug abuse ==
To counteract drug abuse in Missouri, the Substance Abuse and Mental Health Services Administration gave two grants worth a total of 66 million dollars to the Missouri Department of Mental Health, to cover building costs of rehabilitation centers. The Department Of Mental Health launched a public education campaign to educate children about prescription drug addiction. SAMHSA also created a drug abuse hotline to help addicts get treatment. The United States government also created the "Keepin' It REAL Program," as a replacement for the D.A.R.E. Program, after it lost funding in 1998. In addition, citizens have reported to the Missouri State Highway Patrol 530,596 people for drug possession from the years of 2001–2014.

== Specific drugs ==
=== Alcohol ===
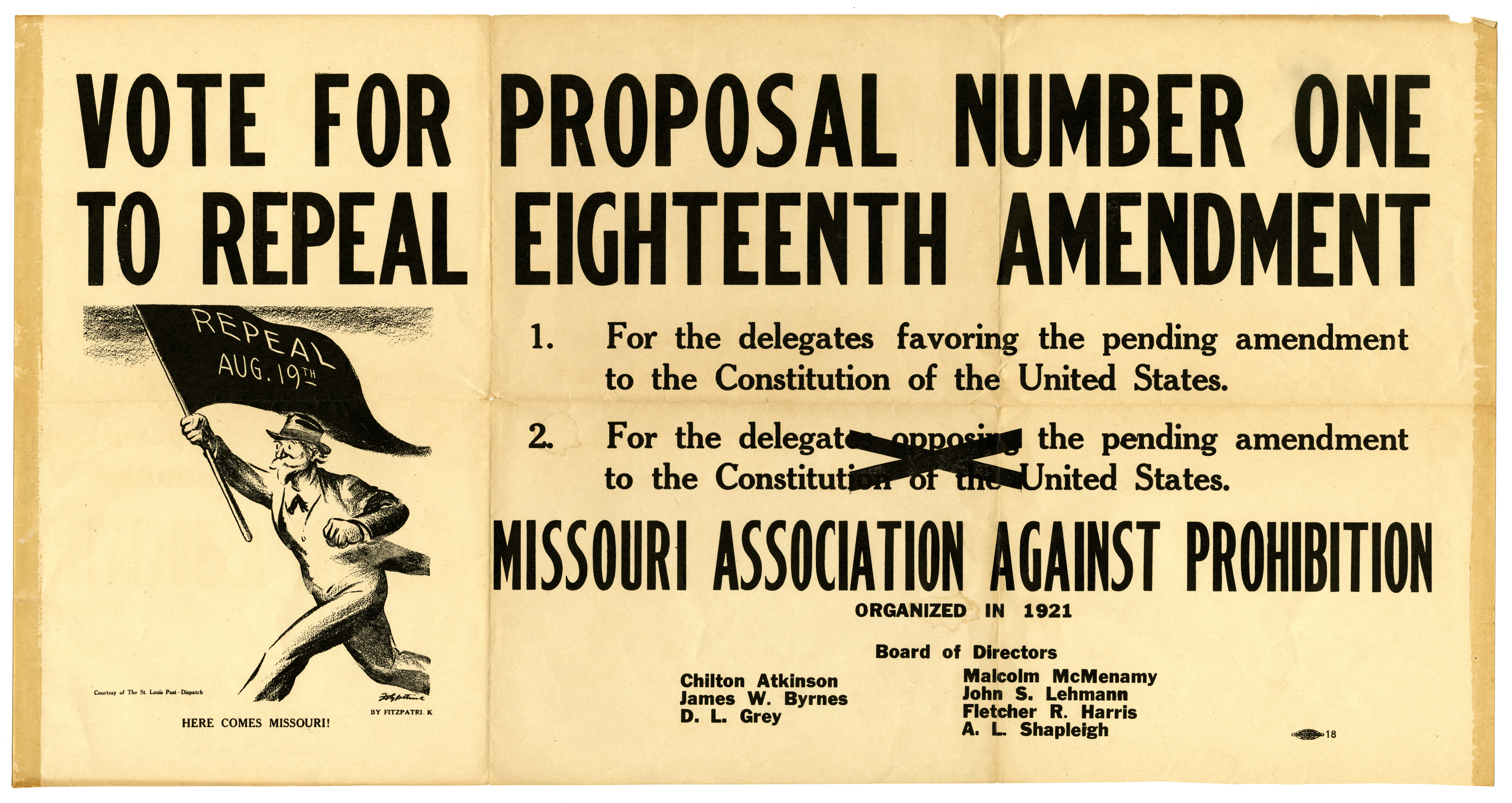
Proposal to repeal the Eighteenth Amendment in Missouri, Association Against the Prohibition Amendment, 1921

Before Prohibition, Missouri was the second largest wine-producing state in the nation, behind Kansas. Prohibition caused Missouri's economy to take a hit, as large wineries like Stone Hill Winery were shut down during prohibition. Vineyards were also uprooted, making it impossible to resume production in 1933, when alcohol bans were lifted.

There are no dry counties in the state of Missouri. In Missouri's constitution, dry counties are prohibited.

=== Cannabis ===
As of November 6, 2018, medical cannabis is legal in Missouri. Recreational marijuana is legal in Missouri. It was illegal to have both a Medical Card and a concealed carry weapon simultaneously in Missouri, but after state legislators passed a law, it became legal to obtain both.

On December 8, 2022, the 2022 Missouri marijuana legalization initiative led to the legalization of cannabis of up to three ounces. Licenses for ownership of dispensaries began being issued on February 30, 2023. With the legalization of recreational cannabis, Missouri became the 21 state to do so.

The Drug Enforcement Administration labeled cannabis as a schedule II drug, but was changed to schedule III after article XIV was signed into the Missouri state constitution.

=== Hallucinogens ===
In 2010, 28,498 mentions of hallucinogen possession were recorded by Missouri Department of Health and Senior Services. A bill titled "HB 869" was proposed to the Missouri House of Representatives in January 2023. The bill was promoted by state representative Tony Lovasco. The bill would've loosened the laws against possessing and the use of psilocybin.

Another bill, titled "SB 678", was promoted by Holly Thompson Rehder in February 2024. The bill aimed to legalized the use of psychedelics for therapy of veterans over the age of 21; it passed in March.

=== Methamphetamine ===
As of January 1, 2017, it is illegal to possess more than 24 grams of methamphetamine.

In 2019, Missouri was labeled "America's Meth Production Capital", after a study carried out by rehabs.com found it to have the highest number of meth labs per capita.

The Drug Enforcement Administration labels methamphetamine as a schedule II drug.

=== Nicotine ===
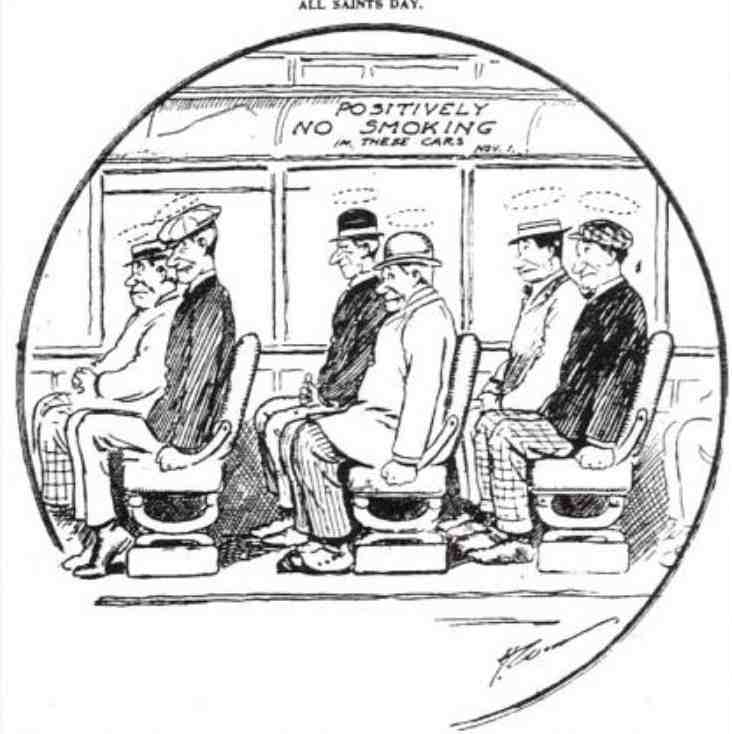
Cartoon of a smoking ban in a tram in Kansas City, Missouri, 1 November 1910

As of 2018, Missouri had the tenth highest rate of nicotine usage in the United States; with around 10% of Missourian youth smoking nicotine. If electronic cigarettes are included in the statistic, then the rate of youth nicotine consumption goes up to 20%.

The Drug Enforcement Administration labels nicotine as a schedule II drug.

=== Opioids ===
Opioids are the most used illicit drug in the state of Missouri. In 2021, there were 1,582 deaths in the state, this accounts for more than 70% of all drug-related deaths in the year 2021. The state of Missouri has provided naloxone to those experiencing overdose. As of 2023, the kratom plant is unbanned from public possession, for anyone over the age of 18 years old. Similarly, the ingredients required to create purple drank have been more restrictive and heavily regulated, especially cough syrup.

The Drug Enforcement Administration labels opioids as a schedule II drug.

=== Prescription medication ===
In 2021, an estimated 235,000 Missourians misused prescription medication in that year. In early 2023, the state government of Missouri issued a statewide prescription monitoring program to all pharmacies in the state. The prescription monitoring program monitors the prescription of everyone, to stop those with a prescription drug addiction from swapping pharmacies to get an early refill on their prescription.

== Sentencing ==
As of 2017, sentencing for drug possession in Missouri is separated into 5 categories, labelled between the letters A and E.

=== Class A ===
Class A covers:

1. Possession near protected areas such as schools or public housing,
2. Meth lab explosions resulting in someone dying or being seriously injured, or
3. A large quantity of cocaine, heroin, phencyclidine, MDMA, or methamphetamine.

Class A sentences are between 10 and 30 years.

=== Class B ===
Class B covers:

1. Transporting controlled substances to minors,
2. A medium quantity of cocaine, heroin, phencyclidine, MDMA, or methamphetamine, or
3. Possession somewhat near protected areas.

Class B sentences are between 5 and 15 years; 10-30 for repeat offenders.

=== Class C ===
Class C covers:

1. Transporting small amounts of cannabis to minors,
2. Possession of any controlled substance, other than cannabis and is less than 35 grams,
3. A small quantity of cocaine, heroin, phencyclidine, MDMA, or methamphetamine, or
4. Creating a dangerous device to aid in the manufacturing of controlled substances.

Class C sentences are between 3 and 10 years; 5-15 for repeat offenders.

=== Class D ===
Class D covers:

1. Possession of less than 30 grams of any controlled substance except for cannabis.

Class D sentences are up to 7 years; 3-10 for repeat offenders.

=== Class E ===
Class E covers:

1. 35 grams or less of cannabis,
2. Legal distribution of drug paraphernalia without taking precautions to stop users from buying,
3. Fraudulently buying a controlled substance,
4. Manufacturing or delivering imitation medications,
5. Possessing or delivering drug paraphernalia,
6. Reckless delivery of controlled substances, or
7. Distributing controlled substances without proper registration.

Class E sentences are up to 4 years; up to 7 years for repeat offenders.

== See also ==
- Drugs in the United States
- Drug policy of the United States
