= Missouri First Steps =

Missouri First Steps is a program offered by the Missouri Department of Elementary and Secondary Education (DESE) that offers coordinated services and assistance to children from birth to age 3 who have delayed development or diagnosed conditions that are associated with developmental disabilities.

First Steps started in 1989, under the requirements of the federal Individuals with Disabilities Education Act (IDEA). It was generally a non-controversial program, popular with recipient families who sought any help they could get to make sure their children could develop their own potential as much as possible.

In early 2005, Governor Matt Blunt proposed eliminating the program in an attempt to cut spending on social services and health care, and balance the state budget. The proposal was widely disliked, by parents and service providers across the state and from all political perspectives. Later, the governor backtracked on his proposal, instead recommending changes to the operation of the program and higher co-pays for services for parents with relatively high incomes.
