= Missouri Foundation for Health =

- Founded: 2000
- Type: Philanthropic foundation
- Location: 4254 Vista Ave, St Louis, MO (800) 655-5560, United States
- Region served: 84 counties in Missouri plus the City of St. Louis
- Key people: Dwayne Proctor (President and CEO)
- Employees: 50
- Website: www.mffh.org

Missouri Foundation for Health (MFH) is an independent philanthropic foundation formed as a "health conversion foundation" in February 2000, following Blue Cross Blue Shield Association of Missouri's transformation from a nonprofit to for-profit company. Federal law requires that proceeds from the sale of tax-exempt entities be directed toward charitable purposes. Using those proceeds, the Foundation was charged with "identifying and filling the gaps in the myriad of public and private health care services already available to the uninsured, the underinsured and the underserved in the 84 counties plus the City of St. Louis."

The Foundation's mission is to eliminate underlying causes of health inequities, transform systems, and enable individuals and communities to thrive.

Dwayne Proctor, Ph.D., joined the Foundation in 2021 as president and chief executive officer.

During the COVID-19 pandemic, MFH committed "$15 million to statewide COVID-19 health and prevention efforts."

== Strategy ==
Missouri Foundation for Health is building a more equitable future through collaboration, convening, knowledge sharing, and strategic investment. Working in partnership with communities and nonprofits, MFH is transforming systems to eliminate inequities within all aspects of health and addressing the social and economic factors that shape health outcomes. The Foundation takes a multifaceted approach to health issues, understanding that strategic initiatives, policy, communications, and research all play a role in creating lasting impact.

At any given time, the Foundation is working on a diverse mix of relevant, timely issues on which it believe it can catalyze change toward a healthier Missouri in which:

- All people have affordable health insurance coverage
- Every Missourian has access to high-quality care
- Inequities in health and well-being disappear, and
- Every community provides a social, economic, and physical environment that offers opportunities to thrive and promotes health and well-being for all.

While the Foundation's environment presents an abundance of opportunities that it could pursue consistent with the breadth of its mission, its existing scale of resources means that it makes thoughtful, responsible choices in order to have impact.

Three big ways the Foundation makes change:

- Contributing toward an enabling environment for improving health equity
- Driving lasting systems change on a carefully selected number of key issues
- Supporting key opportunities to advance its vision and mission

== See also ==
- Blue Cross and Blue Shield of Kansas City
- Health insurance coverage in the United States
