= Show-Me Institute =

American conservative think tank

- Motto: "Where Liberty Comes First"
- Founders: Rex Sinquefield, Crosby Kemper III, Michael Podgursky
- Established: 2005
- Focus: Economic policy in Missouri
- Chair: Crosby Kemper III
- Executive Director: Brenda Talent
- Budget: Revenue: $1.79 million Expenses: $1.71 million (FYE December 2023)
- Address: P.O. Box 16024, Clayton, MO 63105
- Website: showmeinstitute.org

The Show-Me Institute, or SMI, is an American think tank based in Clayton, Missouri that promotes public policies that advance free market principles. Founded in 2005, the organization focuses on economic and good governance issues in the state of Missouri. The stated mission of the Show-Me Institute is "improving the quality of life for all citizens of Missouri by advancing sensible, well-researched solutions to state and local policy issues."

== Policy positions ==
Although SMI does not typically take "institutional" positions, the research of SMI analysts tends to converge in support of small government principles that maximize both economic efficiency in the Missouri economy and individual freedom for Missourians.

=== Taxation ===
SMI research supports low broad-based taxes and a move away from income taxes as keys to economic growth in Missouri. The first paper published by the institute, written by Joseph Haslag in 2006, explored how the 1 percent earnings taxes of Kansas City and St. Louis damaged growth in those cities. An essay published in 2012 by Patrick Ishmael and Michael Rathbone called for the elimination of the corporate income tax through the elimination of economic development tax incentives. In 2019, Patrick Tuohey and Graham Renz explored tax increment financing, community improvement district and other local taxing districts, finding that the districts could often be formed with little public input and that many districts lacked sufficient oversight of the revenues collected.

=== Spending ===
Research by Ishmael and Adam Millsap, published in 2017, explored the relationship between state & local government spending growth and private sector gross state product (GSP) growth. The paper raised concerns about the compounding effects of deadweight losses caused by state governments driving larger and larger portions of their GSP, observing that "[in] a state where government expenditures grow faster than the private sector economy as a whole, the amount of resources the government controls increases over time." The paper included the author-named "IM Index" ranking of states from 2004 to 2013, which compared states based on their overall exposure to these spending and deadweight loss risks.

=== Health care ===
The institute is skeptical of socialized medicine and has criticized the Affordable Care Act. Researchers have written in support of block-granting Medicaid and proposals that would financially incentivize non-long term care beneficiaries to shop for services and voluntarily leave the program. The institute has also written against certificate of need laws and in support of health savings accounts, direct primary care, licensure reform and insurance market deregulation.

=== Government transparency ===
Researchers have supported the expanded use of digital recording, including video and online streaming, of government hearings, including the allowance of outside recording devices when government organs decline to record proceedings themselves. Researchers have also advocated for greater local government transparency, particularly for spending records of municipal, county, and special taxing districts.

=== Education ===
Researchers have supported a variety of school choice initiatives, including education savings accounts, support for charter schools, and greater flexibility in merit pay for high performing teachers. Researchers also introduced a "Missouri Parents' Bill of Rights," with a focus on curricular and spending transparency.

=== Workforce development and labor policies ===
SMI researchers have supported the expansion of apprenticeship programs and a diversification of the state's educational portfolio to better fund blue collar career tracks. Institute researchers view government labor unions as inherently problematic.

=== Housing ===
The institute opposes laws that ban source of income discrimination for tenants, asserting that such laws are "authoritarian" and infringe upon the property rights of landlords.

== Board of directors ==
As of 2023:

- Rex Sinquefield, co-founder and former co-chairman of Dimensional Fund Advisors
- Michael Podgursky, professor of economics
- Louis Griesemer, Chairman of the Board of Springfield Underground, Inc.
- W. Bevis Schock, attorney
- Joseph Forshaw, past president and CEO of Forshaw, a family-owned business
- Stephen F. Brauer, chairman and CEO of Hunter Engineering Company; former ambassador to Belgium
- Jennifer Bukowsky, attorney
- James G. Forsyth III, president and CEO of Moto, Inc.
- Robert M. Heller, former judge
- Megan Holekamp, real estate broker at Janet McAfee Inc.
- Gregg Keller, political consultant
- Kevin Short, co-founder and managing partner/CEO of Clayton Capital Partners
- John Lamping, former member of the Missouri State Senate

== Affiliations ==
The Show-Me Institute is an affiliate of the State Policy Network, an American network of free-market oriented think tanks.
