= Children's Education Alliance of Missouri =

The Children's Education Alliance of Missouri (CEAM) is a non-profit organization concerned with statewide education reform and issues.

The mission of the Children's Education Alliance of Missouri (CEAM) is to improve Missouri's K-12 education system by advancing education policies that ensure all families have the right to choose the education they determine is best for their children.

CEAM turns the spotlight onto community needs in education and seeks to create powerful partnerships with parents, business and civic leaders, students, and educators as part of the Partners for Educational Progress program. CEAM finds and recruits families and members of the community to change the rules of the game through valuable training focused on policy change and communication.

Each year CEAM works to heighten awareness about policies impacting education through outreach efforts and the CEAM Activation Network (CAN). This includes outreach in communities impacted by legislation, community events, and events focused on change makers.

Laura Slay is Executive Director, Peter Franzen is Associate Director. The offices are located at: 1300 Papin Street, St. Louis, MO 63103.
