= Missouri Day =

U.S. holiday commemorating Missouri

- Official name: the Show Me State
- Observed by: Missouri
- Date: Third Wednesday in October
- 2025 date: October 15
- 2026 date: October 21
- 2027 date: October 20
- 2028 date: October 18
- Frequency: Annual

Missouri Day is a national observance in the U.S. state of Missouri. It is held on the third Wednesday in October.

It was originally observed on the first Monday in October, following its establishment by House Bill 122, on March 22, 1915. In 1969, the Missouri General Assembly officially changed the date to the third Wednesday. Missouri Day is set aside to "teach rising generations of boys and girls the glories of Missouri". The inspiration for the day came from Anna Lee Brosius Korn, a schoolteacher from Trenton, Missouri. She was inspired by the spirit of the Missouri people and sought to commemorate them with a holiday. Observances are typically practiced in Missouri schools.

On August 28, 1969, it was moved to the third Wednesday of October. There is also National Missouri Day, established by the National Day Calendar and celebrated on January 4, the anniversary of Missouri statehood.
