= Seal of Missouri =

Official government emblem of the U.S. state of Missouri

The Great Seal of Missouri
- Armiger: State of Missouri
- Adopted: January 22, 1822; 204 years ago (modifications made in 1907)
- Motto: Latin: Salus populi suprema lex esto, lit. 'The welfare of the people is the supreme law'
- Use: in the General Assembly; on official buildings; on the State flag; in the header of the official documents (including letters and commissions)

The Great Seal of Missouri is used to authenticate certain documents issued by the government of Missouri. The phrase is used both for the physical seal itself, which is kept by the secretary of state, and more generally for the design impressed upon it. The Great Seal was designed by judges Claiborne F. Jackson or Robert William Wells.

== Design ==
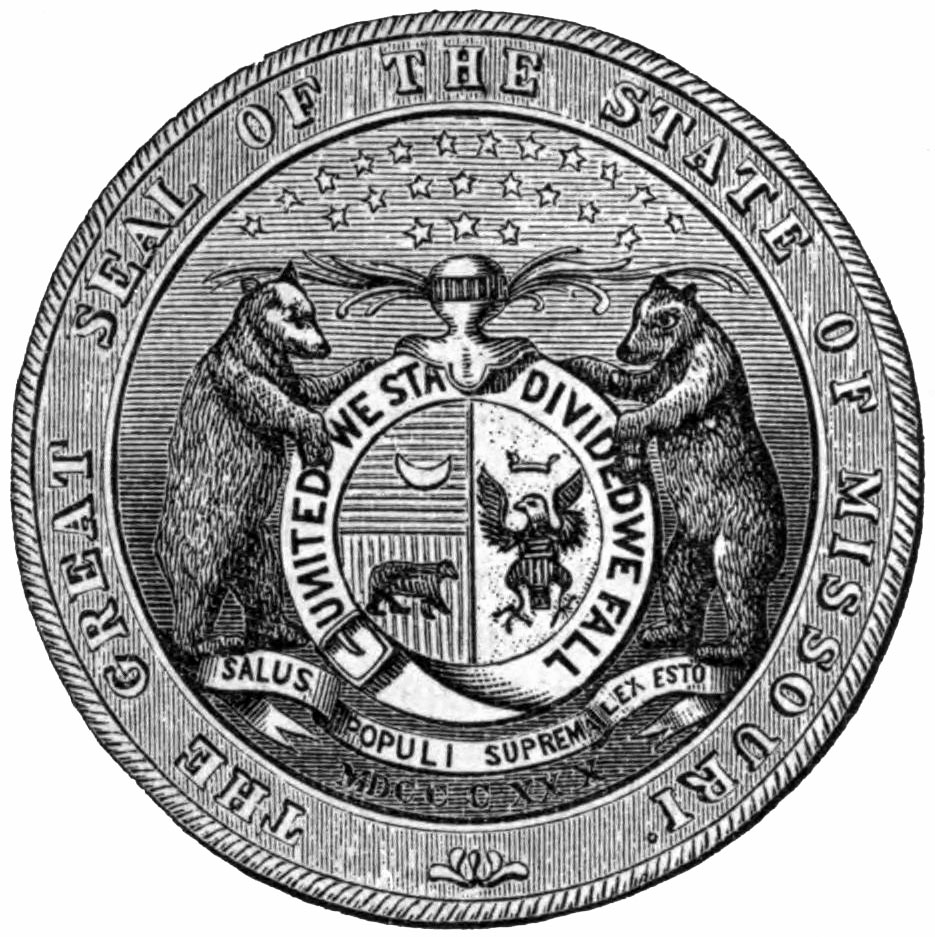
The Seal as it appeared in 1879

The design of the seal was explained in a 1822 newspaper article five days after a law creating the seal was passed:

The arms of the state of Missouri and of the United States, yet separated by a pale, denote the connection existing between the two governments, and show that, although connected by a compact, yet we are independent as to internal concerns; the words surrounding the shield denote the necessity of the Union. Quadruped are the most honorable bearings. The great grizzly bear being almost peculiar to the Missouri River and its tributaries, and remarkable for its prodigious size, strength, and courage, is borne as the principal charge on our shield. The color of the shield is red, and denotes hardiness and valor. The chief is most honorable of all ordinaries. The color blue signifies vigilance, perseverance and justice. The crescent in heraldry is borne on the shield by the second son, and on our shield denotes that we are the second state (Louisiana being the first) formed out of the territory not within the original territorial limits of the United States and admitted into the Union. The crescent also denotes the growing situation of this state as to its inhabitants, wealth, power, etc. The color white signifies purity and innocence. The helmet indicates enterprise and hardihood. The one blazoned on this coat of arms is that assigned to sovereigns only. The star ascending from a cloud to join the constellation shows Missouri surmounting her difficulties and taking her rank among the other states of the Union. The supporters, the same powerful animals, borne on the shield, which support the shield, on which are emblazoned the arms of the state and of the United States, denote, that while we support ourselves by our own internal strength we are also in support of the general government. The motto shows that the good of the people is the supreme law of the state. The numerals under the scroll show the date of the constitution.

A scroll carries the state motto, Salus populi suprema lex esto, a Latin phrase meaning "Let the welfare of the people be the supreme law." The year 1820 is inscribed in Roman numerals below the scroll, the year of the Missouri Compromise, although Missouri was not officially granted statehood until 1821. The outer circle of the seal bears the words "The Great Seal of the State of Missouri". The large star above the helmet surrounded by 23 smaller stars represents Missouri's status as the 24th state.

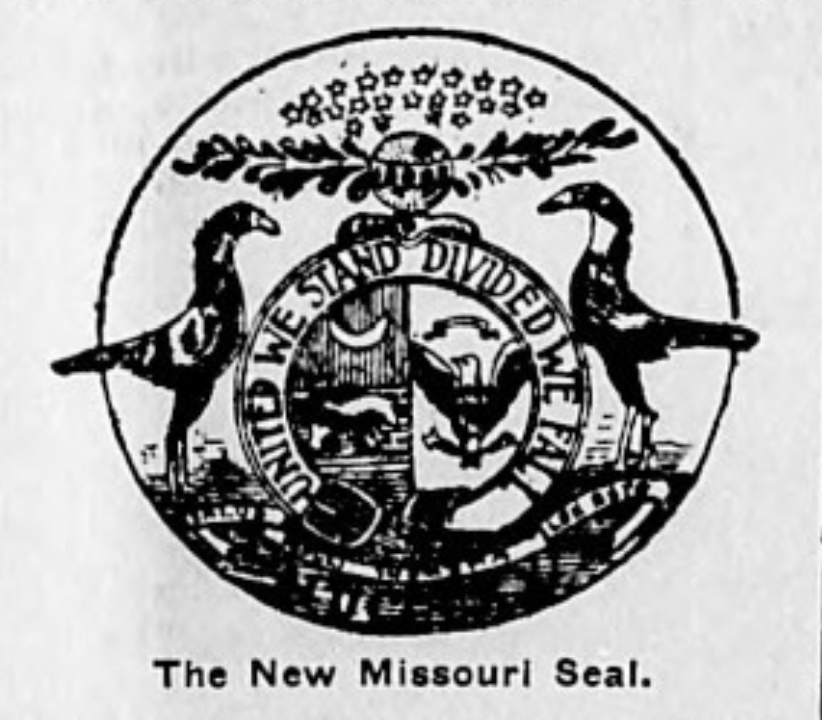
Proposed seal from 1907

Salus populi suprema lex esto (Latin "Let the good of the people be the supreme law" or "The welfare of the people shall be the supreme law") is found in Cicero's De Legibus (book III, part III, sub. VIII), as Ollis salus populi suprema lex esto.

The phrase is the state motto of Missouri, accepted in its state seal. It is also the motto, and appears on the coat of arms, of the City of Salford, the London Borough of Lewisham, the Duquesne University School of Law, and is used as the motto of the Vlaams Belang political group in the Belgian Chamber of Representatives. John Locke uses it as the epigraph in his Second Treatise on Government and refers to it as a fundamental rule for government.

== History ==
=== Creation ===
Mary Miller Smiser gives the background for creating the State Seal: "Upon the admission of Missouri into the Union the Constitution provided for a 'Seal of State,' which should not be subject to change. The Journals of the First Session of the General Assembly show that the members of the House and Senate failed repeatedly in their effort to secure a suitable design for a 'Seal of State.'

"When the Second Session convened November 6, 1821, Governor McNair, in reading his message to the General Assembly, said: 'Considerable inconvenience daily arises from want of a `Seal of State' and I deem it proper to remind you of the necessity of supplying the deficiency at the present session.'

"On reading the Journals of the House and Senate for the Second Session of the First General Assembly, which lasted a little over two months, we find the Senate took no part in making provision for a 'Seal of State.' The whole matter was delegated to the House, in whose hands it soon became a 'Howard County responsibility.' The day following the reading of Governor McNair's message, Duff Green, representative from Howard County, moved that the part of the governor's message pertaining to a 'Seal of State' be referred to a "Select Committee."

The seal was adopted on January 11, 1822. The initial 1822 law describing Missouri's "Seal of State" is as follows:

The device for an armorial achievement for the State of Missouri shall be as follows, to wit: Arms, parted per pale, on the dexter side; gules, the white or grizzly bear of Missouri, passant guardant, proper on a chief engrailed; azure, a crescent argent; on the sinister side, argent, the arms of the United States; the whole with a band inscribed with the words `United We Stand, Divided We Fall.' For the crest, over a helmet full faced, grated with six bars, or a cloud proper, from which ascends a star, argent, on an azure field, surrounded by a cloud proper. Supporters on each side, a white or grizzly bear of Missouri, rampant, guardant proper, standing on a scroll, inscribed with the motto: `Salus Populi Suprema Lex Esto,' and under the scroll the numerical letters MDCCCXX. And the great seal of the state shall be so engraved as to present by its impression the device of the armorial achievement aforesaid, surrounded by a scroll inscribed with the words, "The Great Seal of Missouri," in Roman capitals; which seal shall be in a circular form, and not more than two and a half inches in diameter.

=== Designers ===
Either judges George Frederick Burckhartt, of New Franklin, or Robert Wells, of Jefferson City, designed the seal. Smiser notes that Judge Burckhartt had a liberal education, including Latin grammar and that Mr. Wells had no formal education beyond "a common field school." Then continues with several mentions of Burckhartt family tradition about Burckhartt being the designer. She suggests that Burckhartt wrote the description of the seal and that Wells drafted or drawn the initial design.

=== Removal from state capital ===
Mary Smiser recounts the time the State seal was removed from the state capital during the Civil War:

"When Claiborne F. Jackson was governor he issued a proclamation declaring Missouri out of the Union, left the state capital to escape capture by federal troops and took with him the great seal. That was the original, not the facsimile used in the press to stamp public documents. It has been kept under lock and key in the office of the secretary of state. Governor Jackson died in 1862 and was succeeded by Thomas C. Reynolds then a resident of St. Louis. It was suggested to him that he should return it to the state.

"'I will return it,' replied the governor, 'whenever Missouri has a governor legally elected at the polls.' No persuasion could move him. When Joseph W. McClung, Republican, was elected governor in 1868, defeating John S. Phelps, the Democratic nominee, Governor Reynolds decided to return the great seal. The seal has been in use ever since."

=== Bears ===
The state's Department of Conservation admits that “The bears on the Great Seal of the State of Missouri are grizzly bears, which never resided in the state.” Although the Seal specifies grizzly bears, the 19th century renderings of the state seal shows black bears, which are located in Missouri. Only late 20th century and later state seal renderings, in color, show grizzly bears.

== Government seals of Missouri ==
Seal of the Missouri House of Representatives

Seal of the Missouri Senate

Seal of the State Auditor of Missouri

Seal of the Missouri Public Service Commission

== Cultural references ==
In Roughing It, Mark Twain compares the seal of Missouri unfavorably with the beehive crest of Utah Territory, intentionally misdescribing the former for humorous effect: "The armorial crest of my own State consisted of two dissolute bears holding up the head of a dead and gone cask between them and making the pertinent remark, 'UNITED, WE STAND—(hic!)—DIVIDED, WE FALL.'"

== See also ==
- Flag of Missouri
- Symbols of the state of Missouri
