= Missouri Wall of Fame =

Mural in Cape Girardeau, Missouri

The Missouri Wall of Fame is a 500-foot (150 m) span of flood wall in downtown Cape Girardeau, Missouri, covered with a mural of 45 panels depicting 46 or 47 famous people who were born in the state or achieved fame while living there. The names were chosen by "a panel of the Cape's leading citizens" and it was painted in 1995, and designed by local artist Margaret Dement.

Those depicted on the wall include:

Person	Missouri Connection	Origin of Fame
Burt Bacharach	Kansas City	pianist and composer
Josephine Baker	St. Louis	singer and dancer
Thomas Hart Benton (painter)	Neosho	painter, painted mural at Missouri State Capitol
Thomas Hart Benton (senator)	St. Louis	five term (1821-1851) United States Senator
Yogi Berra	St. Louis	Hall of Fame catcher with the New York Yankees
George Caleb Bingham	St. Louis	artist
Susan Elizabeth Blow	St. Louis	founder of the first public kindergarten
Omar Bradley	Clark	United States Army general in World War II, last person to hold the rank of 5-star general
George Brett	Kansas City	Hall of Fame third baseman with the Kansas City Royals
Lou Brock	St. Louis	Hall of Fame outfielder with the St. Louis Cardinals, former all-time leader in stolen bases
Jack Buck	St. Louis	long-time St. Louis Cardinals broadcaster
August Busch Jr.	St. Louis	developed Anheuser-Busch into the world's largest brewery, also owned the St. Louis Cardinals
Calamity Jane	Princeton	frontierswoman and scout, friend of Wild Bill Hickok
Dale Carnegie	Maryville	writer and researcher, best known for the book How to Win Friends and Influence People
George Washington Carver	Diamond	inventor and researcher
Kate Chopin	St. Louis	author
Walter Cronkite	St. Joseph	long-time CBS evening news anchor
T. S. Eliot	St. Louis	poet, dramatist, and literary critic
Don Faurot	Columbia	former University of Missouri head football coach
Eugene Field	St. Louis	author
Redd Foxx	St. Louis	comedian, star of NBC hit show Sanford and Son
Joe Garagiola	St. Louis	Hall of Fame baseball player and baseball sportscaster
Linda M. Godwin	Jackson	scientist and NASA astronaut
Betty Grable	St. Louis	actress, singer, dancer
Jean Harlow	Kansas City	actress
Langston Hughes	Joplin	poet, novelist, and social activist
John Huston	Nevada	actor and film director
Jesse James and Frank James	Kearney	outlaws
Scott Joplin	Sedalia	composer and musician
Rush Limbaugh	Cape Girardeau	radio personality, acknowledged creator of the political radio talk-show format
Stan Musial	St. Louis	Hall of Fame outfielder with the St. Louis Cardinals
Marie Elizabeth Oliver	Cape Girardeau	creator of the Missouri state flag
Rose O'Neill	Taney County	illustrator and creator of the Kewpie character
James Cash Penney	Hamilton	retailer and founder of J.C. Penney
Marlin Perkins	Carthage	host of Wild Kingdom
John J. Pershing	Laclede	United States Army general during World War I
Vincent Price	St. Louis	actor known for his work in horror films
Joseph Pulitzer	St. Louis	newspaper publisher and creator of the Pulitzer Prize
Ginger Rogers	Independence	dancer and actress
Tom Sawyer	Mississippi River	fictional character portrayed in The Adventures of Tom Sawyer and The Adventures of Huckleberry Finn
Dred Scott	St. Louis	slave, plaintiff in the infamous Dred Scott v. Sandford case
Jess Stacy	Bird's Point	swing pianist
Harry S. Truman	Independence	33rd President of the United States and the only Missourian to hold the office
Porter Wagoner	West Plains	country musician
Laura Ingalls Wilder	Mansfield	author of the Little House on the Prairie series
Tennessee Williams	Columbus	playwright

== See also ==
- Hall of Famous Missourians
