= John Picard =

John Picard may refer to:

- John Picard (architect)
- John Picard (musician)
- John M. Picard, mayor of West Haven, Connecticut

== See also ==
- John Pickard (disambiguation)
