= Miniwiz =

Taiwanese waste recycling company

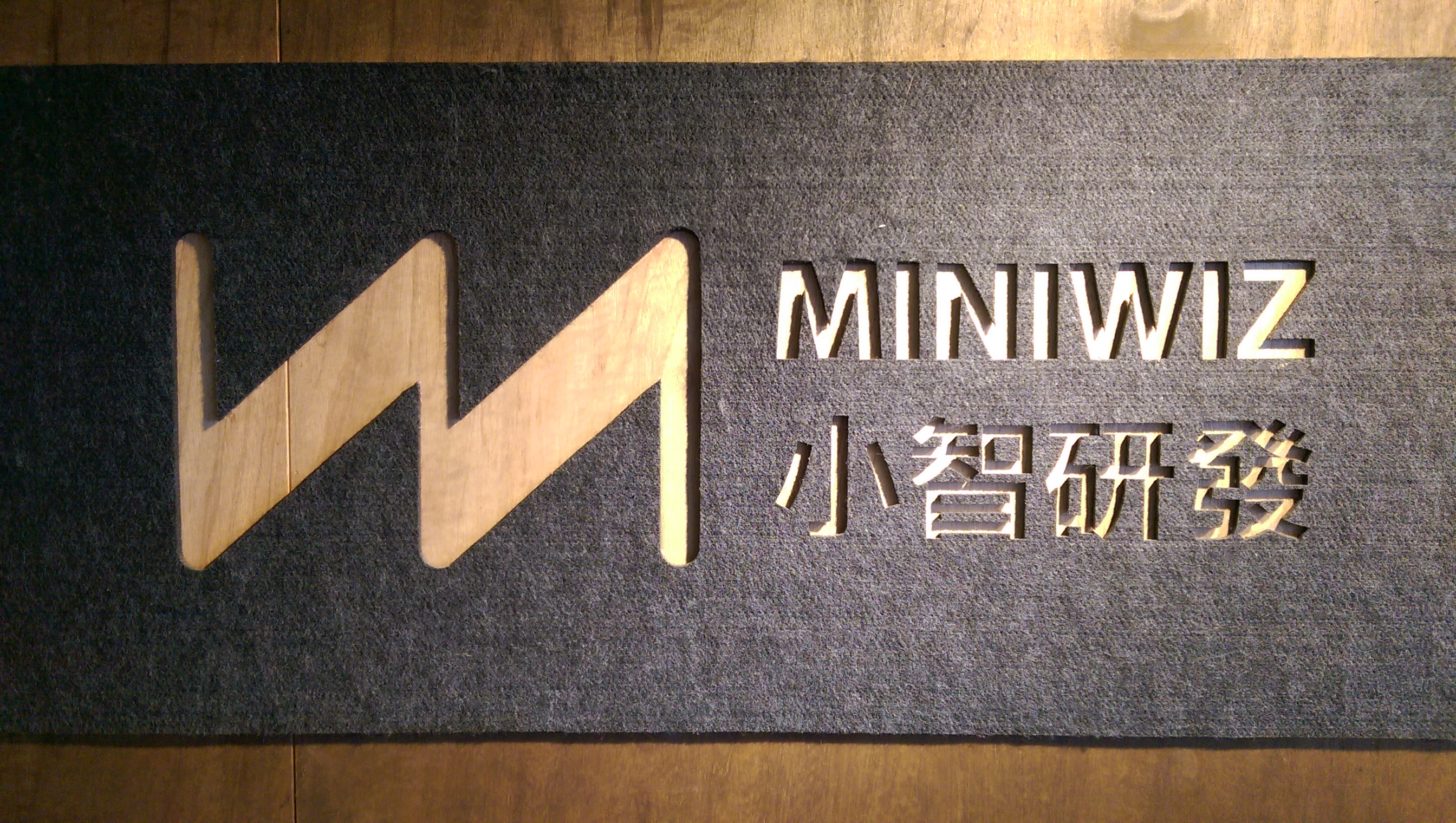
- Founded: 2005
- Headquarters: Taipei, Taiwan
- Key people: Arthur Huang
- Services: Upcycling
- Website: miniwiz.com

Miniwiz (Chinese: 小智研發股份有限公司) is a Taiwanese company that upcycles consumer and industrial waste into construction and consumer products. The company was founded by Arthur Huang. It is headquartered in Taiwan with offices in Milan, Singapore, Beijing, and Shanghai.

== History ==
Miniwiz was founded in March 2005 by Arthur Huang and Jarvis Liu.

In 2010, it constructed EcoARK, a nine-story tall pavilion used as the main exhibition hall for the 2010 Taipei International Flora Exposition. It was built with plastic bottles upcycled as construction material, reportedly saving 300 tons of plastic from ending up in landfills.

In 2010, its Polli-Brick construction material was a finalist in The Earth Awards.

In 2014, it collaborated with Nike, Inc. to recycle athletic shoes and shoe manufacturing by-product into construction material, named Nike Grind.

In May 2015, it announced the Ecofighter project, which would modify a Rutan VariEze by replacing its elements with recycled material, with a flight planned for 2016.

In April 2016, Miniwiz collaborated with tobacco company Philip Morris International to apply recycled filters of iQos heatsticks to architect Cesare Leonard's 1960s furniture designs at the Milan Design Week.

In 2017, Miniwiz collaborated with Bonotto to exhibit textiles created from recycled material at Fuorisalone in Milan and NYCxDesign in New York City.

In 2019, its Trashpresso mobile recycling plant won an IDEAT award. That same year, it also launched a smaller version of the recycling plant named the mini Trashpresso.

== See also ==
- List of companies of Taiwan
