= Marie Oliver =

Marie Oliver may refer to:

- K. K. Beck (born 1950), American novelist who used this pseudonym
- Marie Watkins Oliver (1854-1944), American designer of Missouri state flag
- Olga Kosakiewicz, French actress who used this stage name
