= Hall of Famous Missourians =

Hall in Jefferson City, Missouri, US

The Hall of Famous Missourians is located in Jefferson City, Missouri. The hall is a series of privately funded bronze busts displayed in the Missouri State Capitol between the Missouri Senate and House chambers. The busts, created by Missouri sculptors Sabra Tull Meyer, E. Spencer Schubert, and William J. Williams, depict prominent Missourians honored for their achievements and contributions to the state. As of 2013, there were 44 inductees.

Prior to 2013, all inductees were selected by the sitting Missouri Speaker of the House solely. However, the selection of conservative talk show host Rush Limbaugh to the Hall in 2012 met with strong controversy. With the 2013 induction class, two of the four to be enshrined were selected via votes cast on a web page established by the Missouri House. Two others in 2013 were still chosen by the Speaker, but were uncontroversial in nature.

== Inductees ==
(year of induction in parentheses)

- John Ashcroft (born 1942), U.S. Attorney General and Senator (2006)
- David Rice Atchison (1807–1886), U.S. Senator, President pro-tempore of the Senate (1991)
- Josephine Baker (1906–1975), entertainer and civil rights activist (1995)
- Bob Barker (1923–2023), television personality (2007)
- Tom Bass (1859–1934), horse trainer (1999)
- Annie White Baxter (1864–1944), county clerk (2020)
- Thomas Hart Benton (1889–1975), painter and muralist (1985)
- George Caleb Bingham (1811–1879), painter (2010)
- Susan Elizabeth Blow (1843–1916), educator (1983)
- Roy Blunt (born 1950), U.S. Senator (2024)
- Omar Bradley (1893–1981), World War II military commander (1992)
- Jack Buck (1924–2002), sportscaster (2006)
- Dale Carnegie (1888–1955), author and educator (2006)
- George Washington Carver (1864–1943), scientist, botanist and educator (1983)
- Champ Clark (1850–1921), Speaker of the U.S. House of Representatives (2000)
- Walter Cronkite (1916–2009), broadcast journalist (1999)
- Walt Disney (1901–1966), film and animation innovator (1993)
- Alexander Doniphan (1808–1887), state legislator and militia leader (2008)
- Rose Philippine Duchesne (1769–1852), missionary and educator (2006)
- Betty Grable (1916–1973), actress (2009)
- Joyce C. Hall (1891–1982), businessman (1995)
- Mel Hancock (1929–2011), former U.S. Congressman (2014)
- Warren E. Hearnes (1923–2009), former Missouri governor (2010)
- Robert A. Heinlein (1907–1988), science fiction author (2016)
- Edwin Hubble (1889–1953), astronomer (2003)
- Lamar Hunt (1932–2006), sportsman (2008)
- Edward D. "Ted" Jones Jr. (1925–1990), businessman (2015)
- Scott Joplin (1868–1917), ragtime composer and pianist (1992)
- Ewing Kauffman (1916–1993), businessman and sportsman (1997)
- Emmett Kelly (1898–1979), circus performer and clown (1996)
- Rush Limbaugh (1951–2021), political talk radio host and author (2012)
- James Smith McDonnell (1899–1980), businessman (2010)
- Virginia Minor (1824–1894), women's suffrage activist (2014)
- Johnny Morris (born 1948), Bass Pro Shops founder (2021)
- Stan Musial (1920–2013), baseball player (2000)
- John Neihardt (1881–1973), poet and philosopher (2009)
- Reinhold Niebuhr (1892–1971), pastor, author and political activist (1996)
- Buck O'Neil (1911–2006), baseball player (2012)
- Marie Watkins Oliver (1854–1944), designer of the Missouri state flag (2024)
- Charlie Parker (1920–1955), jazz saxophonist and composer (1994)
- James Cash Penney (1875–1971), businessman (1994)
- Marlin Perkins (1905–1986), zoologist (2004)
- John J. Pershing (1860–1948), World War I military commander (1995)
- Ginger Rogers (1911–1995), dancer and actress (2009)
- Sacajawea (1788–1812), interpreter and guide (1993)
- Dred Scott (1790–1858), slave and civil rights figure, (2012)
- Andrew Taylor Still (1828–1917), physician, "father of osteopathic medicine" (2014)
- Norm Stewart (born 1935), college basketball coach (2024)
- Harry S. Truman (1884–1972), U.S. President (1991)
- Mark Twain (1835–1910), author and humorist (1982)
- Porter Wagoner (1927–2007), country music singer (2020)
- Laura Ingalls Wilder (1867–1957), author (1993)

== See also ==
- Missouri Wall of Fame
- List of people from Missouri
