= David Wendell =

American biomedical engineer and academic

David Wendell is an associate professor at the University of Cincinnati.

== Background ==
David Wendell studied at Cornell University and University of California, Los Angeles. Wendell's field of study is nanotechnology and his PhD focused on biomedical engineering.

In 2009, Wendell and a team of scientists from the University of Cincinnati undertook a research program that resulted in the successful development of an artificial pore. In September 2009, their subsequent paper, “Translocation of double-stranded DNA through membrane-adapted phi29 motor protein nanopores,” appeared in the Journal Nature Nanotechnology. The engineered channel has potential applications in nano-sensing, gene delivery, drug loading and DNA sequencing.

The researchers identified ways to take energy from the Sun, and carbon from the air to create new forms of bio-fuels. Their report, "Artificial Photosynthesis in Ranaspumin-2 Based Foam" was published in the journal Nano Letters, in March 2010.

== Artificial Photosynthetic Foam ==
In 2010, David Wendell, as Research Assistant Professor, worked alongside student Jacob Todd and College of Engineering and Applied Science Dean Carlo Montemagno to create a new artificial photosynthetic material which uses plant, bacterial, frog and fungal enzymes, trapped within a foam housing, to produce sugars from sunlight and carbon dioxide, known as Artificial Photosynthetic Foam.

In August 2010, David Wendell was announced as one of six finalists for The Earth Awards - an annual competition for design and innovation with the potential to improve quality of life. He was later awarded the 50,000 USD Grand Prize for The Earth Awards in London on September 16, 2010.
