= Women Who Ruled: Queens, Goddesses, Amazons, 1500–1650 =

2002 exhibition of Renaissance and baroque art

Women Who Ruled: Queens, Goddesses, Amazons, 1500–1650 was a 2002 traveling exhibition that was developed by the University of Michigan Museum of Art.

== Background ==
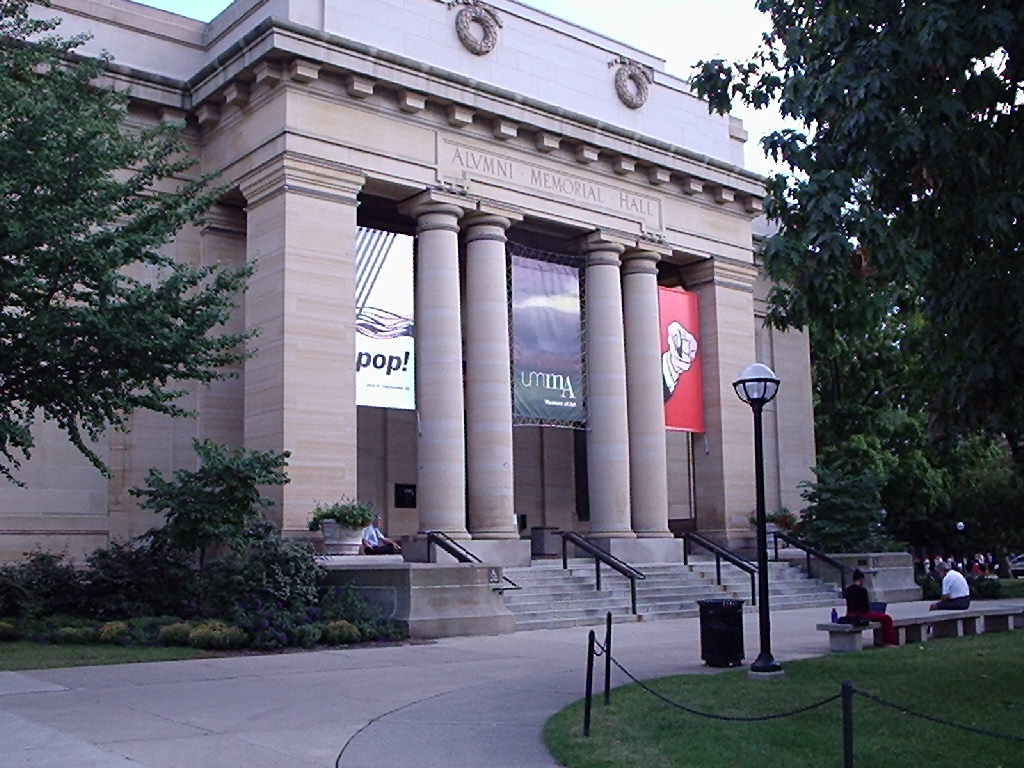
The University of Michigan Museum of Art, in Ann Arbor, Michigan

Curated by Annette Dixon, the exhibition featured over 100 works of Renaissance and baroque art (including paintings, prints, books, drawings, sculpture and decorative art objects) loaned by a variety of institutions, including the Uffizi, the British Museum, the Louvre, the Bibliothèque National, the Museum of Fine Arts, Boston, the Art Institute of Chicago, and the Metropolitan Museum of Art, as well as around 80 pieces from the University of Michigan Museum of Art's permanent collection. Forty-seven institutions loaned pieces, including 12 in Europe.

UMMA first exhibited the show, February 17–May 5, 2002. Later, it traveled to the Davis Museum at Wellesley College, September 19–December 8, 2002.

The exhibition's webpage received the 2002 Award for Projects in Media from the Society for the Study of Early Modern Women.

== Description ==
The exhibition was split into six thematic areas: Wives and Mothers, The Virgin, Seductresses and Other Dangerous Women, The Heroine, The Warrior Women and The Goddess.

== Art and objects on display ==
Notable pieces in the exhibition included:

=== Paintings ===
- Judith Beheading Holofernes by Cornelius Galle the Elder (loaned from the Metropolitan Museum of Art)
- Judith with the Head of Holofernes by Fede Galizia (loaned from the Ringling Museum)
- Salome with the Head of Saint John the Baptist (loaned from the Cleveland Museum of Art)
- Portrait of Elizabeth I (1533-1603), The Armada Portrait, c.1600
- Maria Maddalena of Austria (Wife of Duke Cosimo II de' Medici) with her Son, the Future Ferdinand by Justus Sustermans (loaned from the Flint Institute of Arts)
- Susanna and the Elders by Massimo Stanzione (loaned from the Joslyn Art Museum)
- Athena Scorning the Advances of Hephaestus by Paris Bordone (loaned from the Museum of Art and Archaeology, University of Missouri-Columbia)

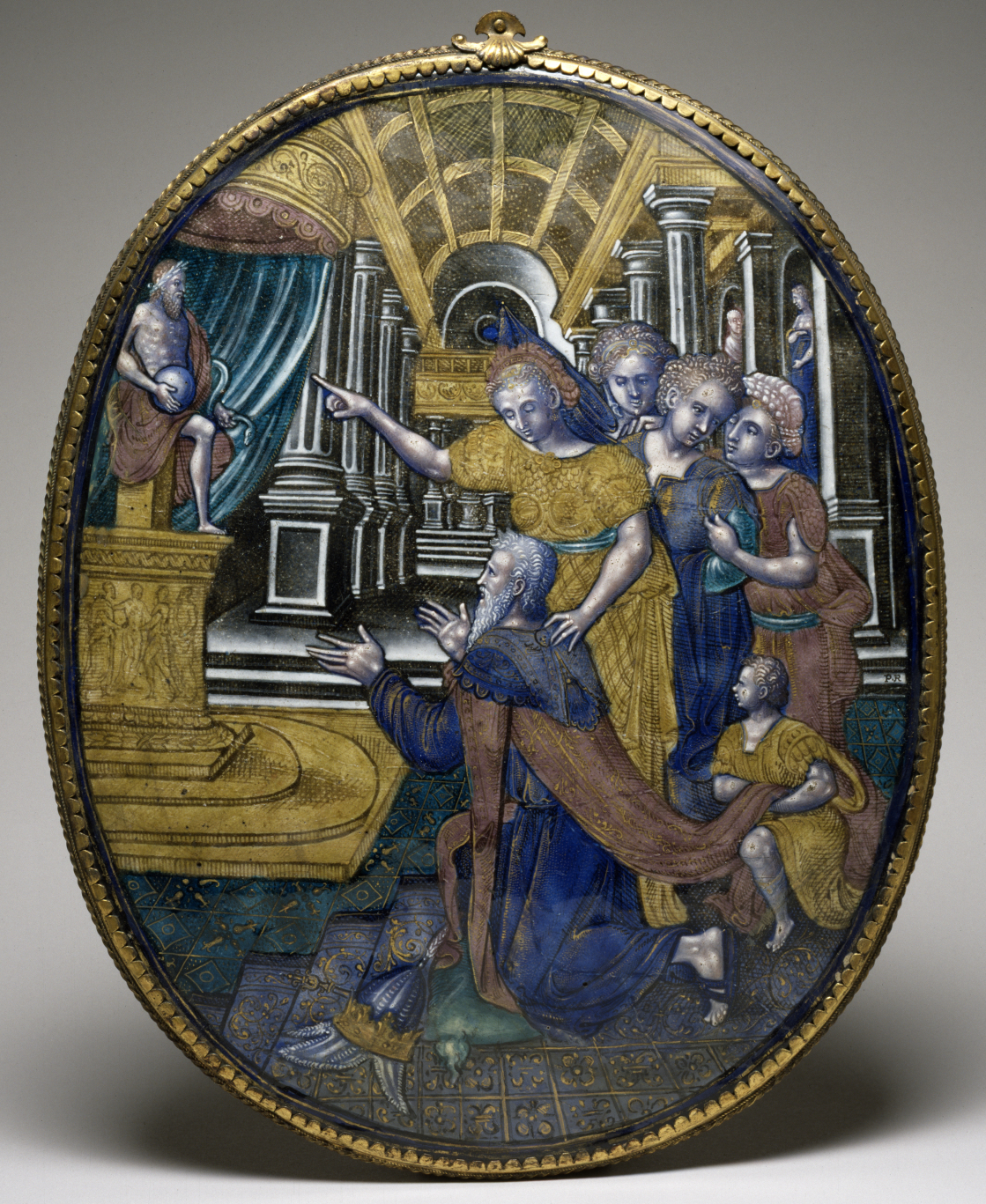
Plaque with Solomon Turning to Idolatry

=== Engravings ===
- The Angry Wife, from the series Scenes of Daily Life by Israhel van Meckenem (loaned from the Ackland Art Museum)
- Judith Seated in an Arch by Hans Sebald Beham

=== Enamel ===
- Plaque with Solomon Turning to Idolatry by Pierre Raymond (loaned from the Walters Art Museum)

== Reviews ==
A February 2002 review in The Art Newspaper noted, "The unfortunate effect of anachronistically using art as a political or sociological tool is twofold: it is self-defeating by its intellectual and historical shabbiness and it devalues the works of art by using them as evidence secondary to another purpose or point, rather than acknowledging them as independent aesthetic objects."

Glen Mannisto, writing for the Detroit Metro Times, said that the exhibition had "a pervasive creepiness and edgy hilarity," and noted that "Its blend of scholarship, horror, visual intrigue and historical irony makes this show a most engaging experience."

A reviewer for the College Art Association, reviewing the exhibition catalog in 2003, said, "A real achievement here is the presentation of relevant materials in a variety of medium and scale, which represents the past better than the usual art-museum exhibition that privileges painting. Included are not just large-scale paintings and sculptures, but also enamels, cameos, medals, illustrated books, drawings, illuminated manuscripts, woodcuts, engravings (both reproductive and original), engravings with etching, saltcellars, and even silver tankards. . . . Unfortunately missing are tapestries, an important vehicle for royal propaganda, but drawings for them are included."
