= Flag of Kansas City, Missouri =

Kansas City
- Use: Civil and state flag
- Proportion: 7:12
- Adopted: February 9, 2023; 3 years ago
- Design: Two horizontal bicolor of red and blue with a white stylized KC emblem centered on the two bands.
- Designed by: Jared Horman

The flag of Kansas City, Missouri, simply known as the KC Flag, consists of two horizontal bars, red above blue, with a white stylized fountain emblem. It is the seventh city flag for Kansas City.

It was designed by Jared Horman. The current flag was adopted by a 10–1 vote by the City Council on February 9, 2023. Proponents of the new design cite the flag's improved "visibility and ease of identification and production."

== Past flags ==
The first flag of Kansas City, adopted in 1913, was pennant shaped and contained the Seal of Kansas City as well as the words "KANSAS CITY". The second flag, adopted in 1936, replaced the pennant with a more customary rectangle, but bore the same seal as the earlier pennant, placed between the words "KANSAS" and "CITY" on the center stripe in a blue–white–blue horizontal triband.

The third flag, adopted in 1944, carried over the triband motif from the previous design. The city seal had been updated, and was now displayed larger than the preceding design, so it covered portions of all three stripes rather than being contained within the center stripe. This design also deleted the words "KANSAS" and "CITY" that had flanked the seal on the previous design.

The fourth flag was adopted in 1972, and featured the Kansas City Bicentennial Seal or "Paper Clip Seal" on a white field with two vertical bars on the end.

In 1992 this version updated the seal to the fountain emblem, and added the words "City of Fountains / Heart of the Nation" above the emblem and "Kansas City / Missouri" below it. Three years later, the flag was updated again, placing the words and emblem into the French tricolor, representing the connection to the French fur traders along the Missouri River; this version remained until the current flag was adopted in 2023.

== Symbolism ==
The current flag has meaning in various parts of its design. For example, the red bar on top represents the kindness and warm heartedness of the people of Kansas City. The blue bar on the bottom represents the nearby Missouri River. The white emblem in the center is a fountain, representing how Kansas City is the city of fountains. The emblem also has a vague heart silhouette, showing how Kansas City is the heart of the nation, and again alluding to the compassion of the citizens of Kansas City.

== Gallery ==
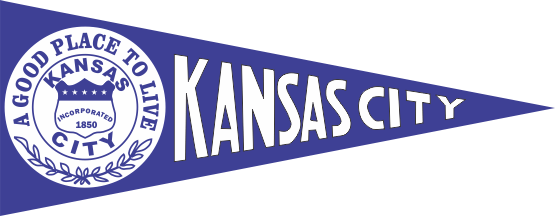
1913–1936

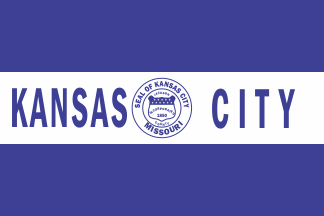
1936–1944

1944–1972

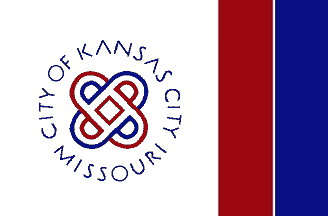
1972–1992

1992–1995

1995–2023

== See also ==
- Flag of St. Louis
- Flag of Missouri
- List of flags by design
- List of U.S. state, district, and territorial insignia
