= The Earth Awards =

- Founded: 2007
- Founder: Nicole Ting-Yap
- Purpose: Education
- Location: California
- Region served: International
- Employees: >50 worldwide

The Earth Awards is an annual competition for sustainable design and innovation. It is an annual competition since 2007, aiming to "transform visionary ideas into market-ready solutions by offering finalists the unique opportunities to pitch their project to world business leaders". The Awards are open to students, graduates and industry professionals - the public is invited to submit innovations to be judged.

== Background ==
The Earth Awards originated from a collective of designers, architects, scientists, writers, and entrepreneurs. The event was founded by Nicole Ting-Yap, as an initiative of the ecoStyle Project, established in 2007 by the Malaysian Government.

== Current Organization ==
As of 2010 the event is produced by NYC Inc, and Karena Albers of the organization kontentreal is the Director of the Awards.

Submissions are judged by a panel that includes Yves Behar, Richard Branson, David DeRothschild, Bill McKibben, and TreeHugger Founder Graham Hill.

== Categories and Criteria ==
The Earth Awards is a global search for creative solutions designed for the 21st century. The award represents six categories: Built Environment, Product, Future, Systems, Fashion, and Social Justice.

Ideas, great or small, realized or prototypes, are considered but must distinguish themselves in six criteria: Achievable, Scalable, Measurable, Useful, Original and Ecological.

== Annual results ==
=== The Earth Awards 2010 ===
One finalist from each of the six categories will have their sustainable designs showcased in September 2010. This will include an exhibition in London, in conjunction with the Financial Times’ Sustainable Business Conference and gala dinner that will invite CEOs, entrepreneurs and venture capitalists to match innovation with investment.

The 2010 Selection Committee includes:

- Paola Antonelli, Curator for Architecture and Design, Museum of Modern Art
- Yves Béhar, Founder, Fuseproject
- Richard Branson, Founder and CEO, Virgin Group
- Graydon Carter, Editor-In-Chief, Vanity Fair
- Majora Carter, President, The Majora Carter Group
- Tony Chambers, Editor-in-Chief, Wallpaper* Magazine
- Alexandra Cousteau, Founder, Blue Legacy International
- David de Rothschild, Founder, Adventure Ecology
- The Gyalwang Drukpa, Spiritual Leader, The Drukpa Lineage
- Rick Fedrizzi, President and CEO, United States Green Building Council
- Julie Gilhart, Fashion Director, Barneys New York
- Jane Goodall, Jane Goodall Institute & UN Messenger of Peace
- Scott Mackinlay Hahn, Co-founder, Rogan and Loomstate
- Peter Head, Director, Arup
- Graham Hill, Founder of TreeHugger
- Khaldoon Khalifa Al Mubarak, CEO, Mubadala Development Company
- Yang Lan, Chairwoman, Sun Television
- Ira C. Magaziner, Chairman, Clinton Climate Initiative
- Bill McKibben, Writer, Environmentalist
- Barry Nalebuff, Professor, Yale School of Management
- Sergio Palleroni, Co-founder and Director, BaSiC Initiative
- Karim Rashid, Founder, Karim Rashid Inc.
- Jonathan Rose RIBA, Principal, Aecom and Masterplanning Practice Leader
- Cameron Sinclair, Founder, Architecture for Humanity
- Werner Sobek, Founder, Werner Sobek Engineering + Design
- Philippe Starck, Founder, Starck Network
- Diane von Furstenberg, Founder, DvF
- Dilys Williams, Director, Center for Sustainable Fashion
- Ken Yeang, Principal, Llewelyn Davies Yeang

=== The Earth Awards 2009 ===
In 2009, The Earth Awards ceremony took place in New York City. Neri Oxman's project FAB.REcology won the grand prize for combining principles of biomimicry with the design and construction of built environments.

A diverse panel served on the Selection Committee, including: Paola Antonelli, Adam Bly, David Buckland, Antonio de la Rua, David de Rothschild, Nicky Gavron, Scott Hahn, Peter Head, Graham Hill, Dr. Dan Kammen, Yang Lan, Thom Mayne, Michael McDonough, Khaldoon Khalifa Al Mubarak, Barry Nalebuff, Sergio Palleroni, John Picard, Werner Sobek, Terry Tamminen, Suzanne Trocmé, Dilys Williams, and Dr. Kenneth Yeang.
