= John Pickard =

John Pickard may refer to:

- John Pickard (archaeologist) (1858–1937), University of Missouri professor of archaeology and art history
- John Pickard (politician) (1824–1883), Canadian businessman and politician
- John Pickard (composer) (born 1963), British composer of classical music
- John Pickard (British actor) (born 1977), British actor
- John Pickard (American actor) (1913–1993), American actor
- John Pickard (neurosurgeon) (born 1946), British neuroscientist
- John Pickard (writer) (1910–1995), Australian writer, see From These Roots
