= Arthur Huang =

Taiwanese architect and designer

Arthur Huang 黃謙智
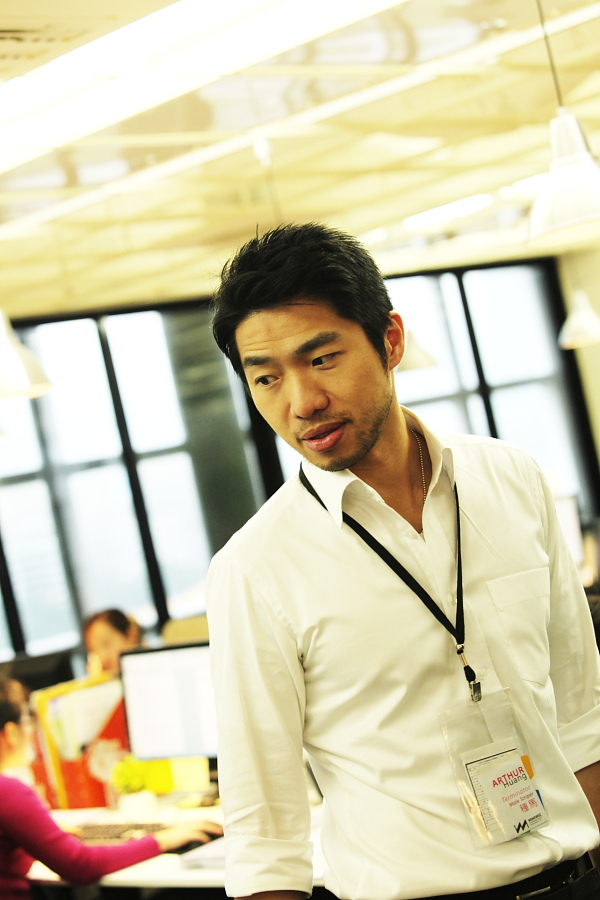
- Born: 1978 (age 47–48); Taipei, Taiwan
- Education: Cornell University; Harvard University
- Occupation: Architect
- Awards: Charles Goodwin Sands Memorial Medal

Arthur Huang (Chinese: 黃謙智; born 1978) is a Taiwanese structural engineer and architect. In 2005, he established Miniwiz, an internationally operating company based in Taiwan, Singapore, Beijing and Milan, and dedicated to upcycling and consumer trash and industrial waste.

== Early life and education ==
Arthur Huang was born in Taiwan in 1978 and moved to the United States at age 11. He graduated from Cornell University with a degree in architecture and structural engineering. At Cornell University, Arthur was awarded the Charles Goodwin Sands Memorial Medal and academic leadership award for his work in design and technical performance.

Continuing his search for multi-disciplinary professional training, he graduated from Harvard University with a Master of Architecture degree in 2004 with special interest invested in green business development. At the age of 26, Huang taught as a full-time at Tunghai University Architecture Program in Taiwan for two years, and he subsequently continues his teaching as part-time assistant professor at National Chiao Tung University in Taiwan, lecturing in MBA, material engineering, and architecture design courses.

== Career at Miniwiz ==
During his teaching life, he was aware that there were many who spoke of environmental issues, but few who had developed appealing products. Hence, he established Miniwiz in March 2005, which was registered and located in Taipei, Taiwan. Miniwiz deals with post consumer recycling technology, built infrastructure and architectural solutions. Miniwiz has been challenging the existing linear supply chain by using post-consumer recycled materials for high performance applications, retail store interiors, factory campuses or consumer goods.

== Notable works ==
- 2013 Area 13 – Taipei, Taiwan
- 2013 Nike X158 Hyper Nature – Shanghai, China
- 2012 Nike the Feather Pavilion – Beijing, China
- 2011 EcoArk – Taipei, Taiwan

== Awards and honors ==
- 2016 - Emerging Explorer, National Geographic
- 2015 – Technology Pioneer, World Economic Forum
- 2013 – IDEA GOLD Award, Chicago, USA
- 2012 – Mayor Bloomberg's New York Venture Fellowship, New York, USA
- 2011 – Wall Street Journal Innovation Award, Hong Kong
- 2011 – 40 under 40 Design Talent Award, Perspective, Asia
