= Oliver-Leming House =

Historic house in Missouri, United States

- U.S. National Register of Historic Places
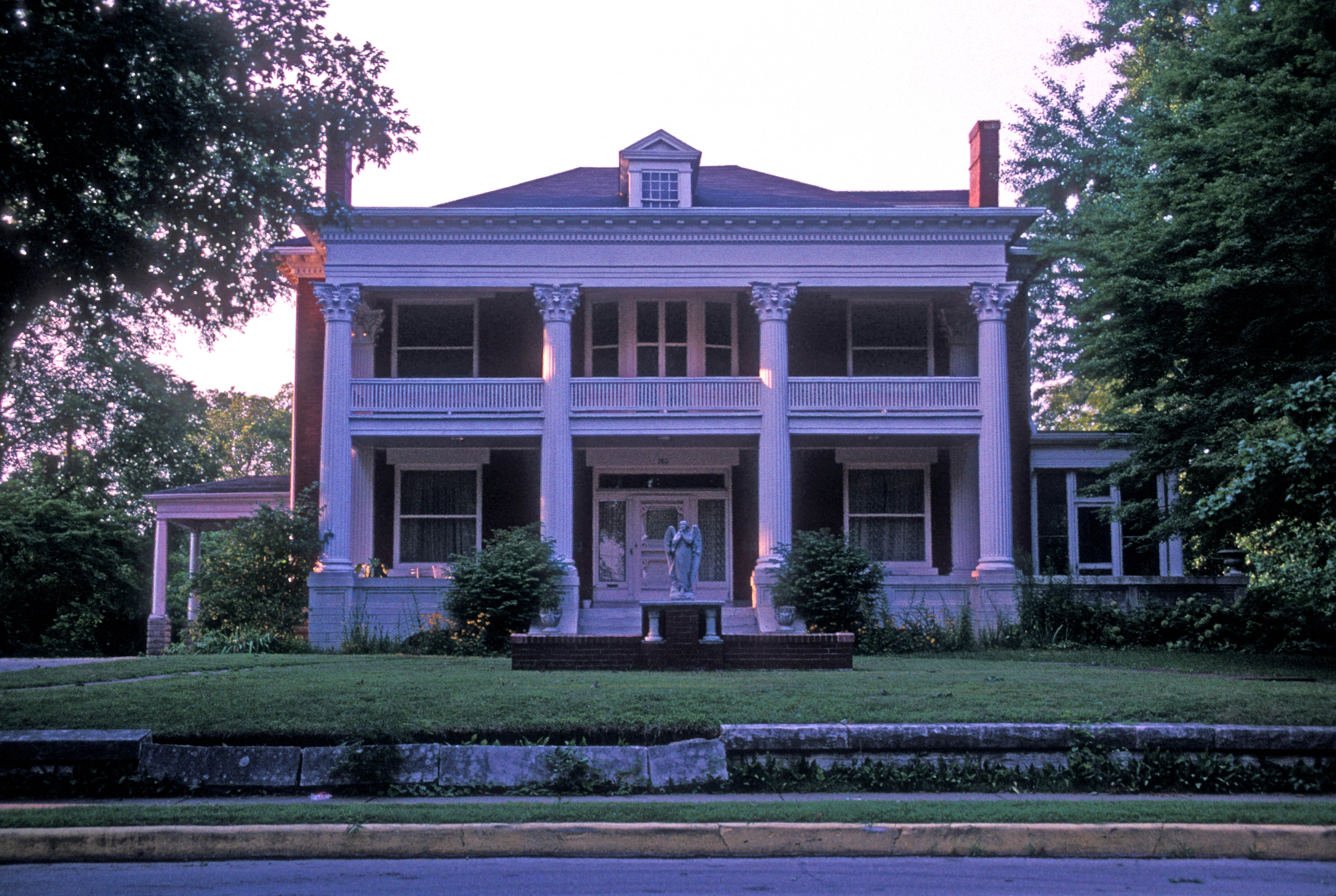
- Oliver-Leming House, April 2007

- Location within Missouri Location within the United States
- Location: 740 North St., Cape Girardeau, Missouri
- Coordinates: 37°18′35″N 89°31′40″W
- Area: 0.5 acres (0.20 ha)
- Built: 1898-1899
- Architect: Legg, J.B., Architectural Co.; Madden, John
- NRHP reference No.: 80002323
- Added to NRHP: September 12, 1980

Oliver-Leming House, also known as the Home of the Missouri State Flag, is a historic home located at Cape Girardeau, Missouri. It was designed by J.B. Legg, and built in 1898–1899. It is a 2 1/2-story, red brick dwelling of symmetrical design. It features a full-width, two-story front portico supported by six, two-story Corinthian order columns supporting a second story porch, and an irregular interior floor plan.

It remains a private residence and it was listed on the National Register of Historic Places in 1980.
