= The Sciences and The Arts Fountains =

Two fountains in Jefferson city, Missouri

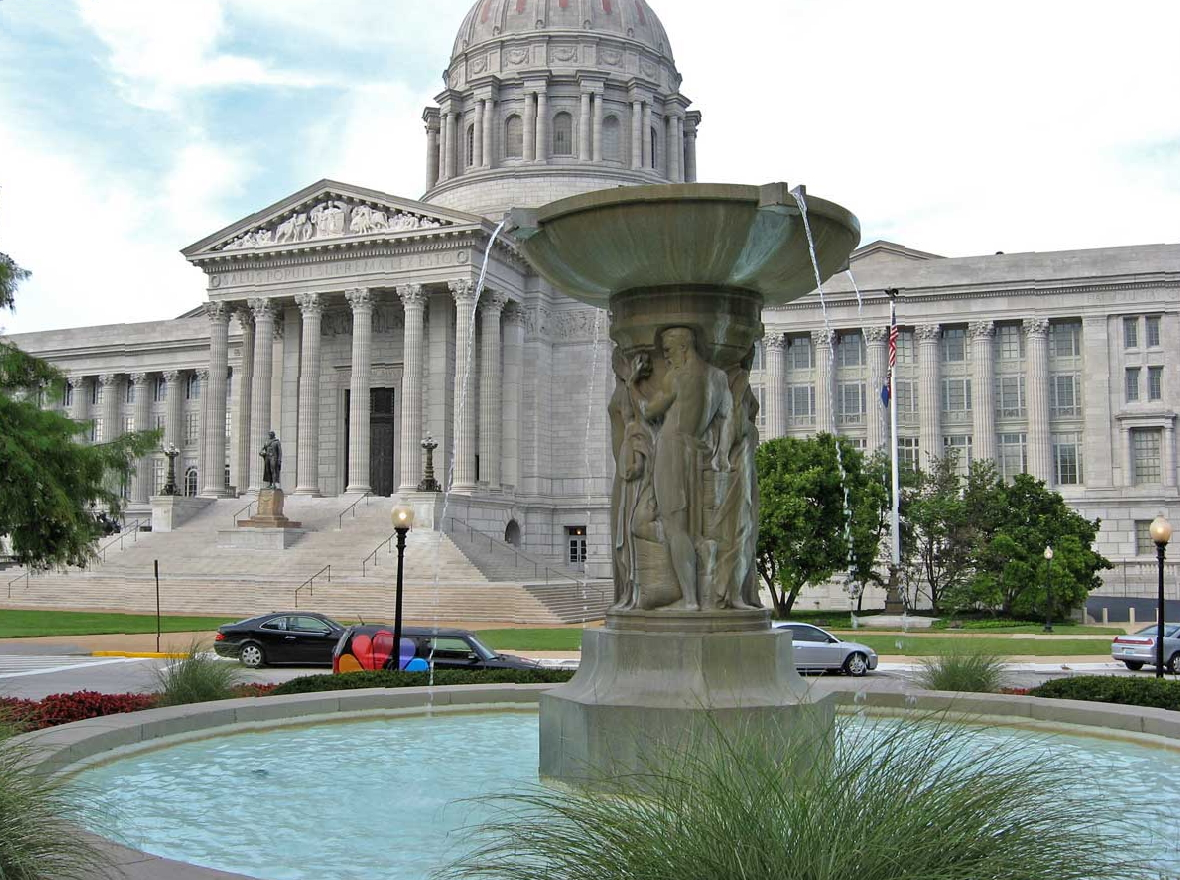
The Sciences 38°34′42″N 92°10′24″W

The Sciences and The Arts Fountains are a pair of Bedford limestone fountains, one on either side of the main entrance to the Missouri State Capitol, across West Capitol Avenue, in Jefferson City, created by Robert Ingersoll Aitken. Each fountain consists of two basins—the lower 35 feet (11 m) in diameter and the upper 11 feet (3.4 m) feet in diameter. The latter are supported by drums on which allegorical figures are carved in relief. The four figures on each fountain alternate between male and female.

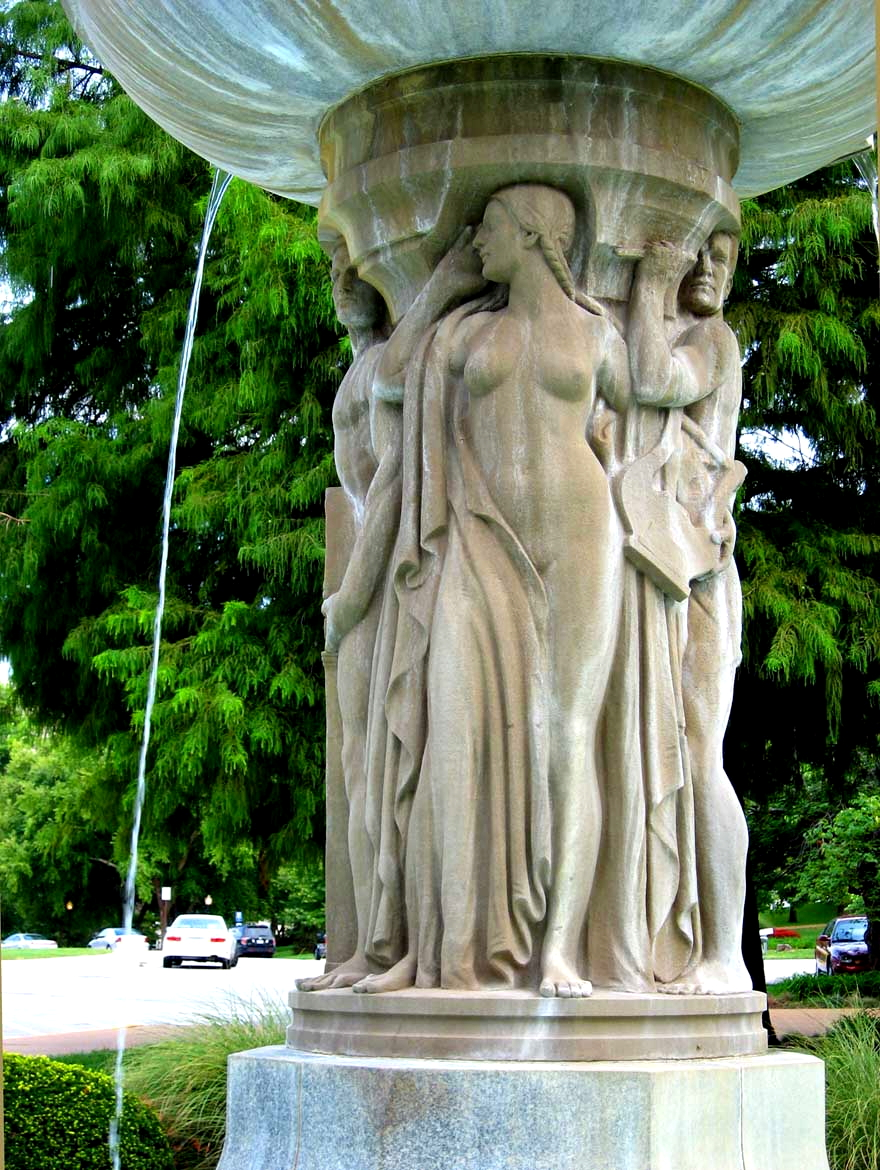
The Arts (Music) 38°34′44″N 92°10′27″W

The figures on the Sciences fountain represent Geometry, Geology, Chemistry, and—since the figures are all classical in design—Astrology, the "elder sister" of Astronomy. Those on the Arts fountain represent Architecture, Sculpture, Painting, and Music.

The works were dedicated on October 6, 1924.
