= Marie Watkins Oliver =

Designer of the Flag of Missouri

Marie Elizabeth Oliver (January 11, 1854 - October 18, 1944) was the designer of the Missouri state flag.

== Biography ==
Marie Elizabeth (née Watkins) Oliver was born in Ray County, Missouri to Charles Allen and Henrietta (née Rives) Watkins. The family lived in a country home called Westover, and were fairly well off due to her father's work as both a farmer and businessman. Her father developed a number of businesses with her uncle, James R. Allen, including a brickyard, flour mill, sawmill, store, and warehouse. She was educated by a governess and at private schools, before attending Richmond College with her younger brothers.

Oliver became the tutor for her brothers as they prepared to attend the University of Missouri. One of her brothers, Charles, roomed with a law student, Robert Burett Oliver, who would eventually become her husband. When Charles died, Robert began exchanging letters with Marie. They wrote for two years before eventually meeting in 1876. After a long courtship, the two were married on December 10, 1879. The two moved to Jackson, Missouri, where Robert worked as a lawyer until he was elected to the Missouri Senate in 1882. She had five sons and one daughter while living in Jackson: Robert Burett, Jr.; John Byrd, Allen Laws; William Palmer; Charles Watkins; and Marie Marguerite. During that time, Marie began volunteering throughout the community.

In 1896, Oliver moved with her family to Cape Girardeau, Missouri, where her husband established his law firm. In 1904, she joined the Nancy Hunter Chapter of the Missouri Society of the Daughters of the American Revolution, and in 1907 she was elected state vice regent.

== Missouri flag ==
Flag proposal, adopted in 1913

In 1908, the Missouri Society of the Daughters of the American Revolution noticed the State did not have an official flag, and Mrs. Samuel McKnight Green appointed a committee to research, design, and secure passage of a bill for an official flag. Oliver was appointed chairperson of the committee, and began writing to the secretaries of state for every state and territory in the Union, in order to learn how other locations designed their flags, and the process necessary to have them adopted. She received an answer from every Secretary of State, and spent months researching historical interests connected to passing legislation about state flags. She envisioned a flag that featured the Missouri coat of arms, encircled by twenty four stars that represented Missouri's status as the twenty-fourth state to enter the Union. Oliver's friend and artist, Mary Kochtitzky, painted Oliver's design, and her husband, now a former state senator, drafted the legislative bill.

On March 17, 1909, Oliver's nephew, Senator Arthur L. Oliver, introduced the bill to the Missouri Senate. The bill passed twenty four to one, but failed to pass in the House of Representatives. The bill was reintroduced in 1911, but met with the same result since the General Assembly was considering another design known as the "Holcomb flag." Oliver thought that the "Holcomb flag" did not distinctively represent Missouri, since the stripes might be confused with the National flag, and failed to include any representation of local government. Later that year, the Missouri State Capitol burned, destroying Kochtitzky's original work. Oliver and another friend, Mrs. S. D. MacFarland, recreated the design in silk. On January 21, 1913, the Oliver Flag Bill was again reintroduced, this time passing on March 7 and being officially signed by Governor Elliot Woolfolk Major on March 22, 1913.

Oliver kept the silk flag until her death in 1944, when she was buried in Lorimer Cemetery in Cape Girardeau. In 1961, her son Allen donated the flag to the State of Missouri, where it was put on display until it began to deteriorate. In 1988, elementary students raised enough money to restore the flag in honor of its 75 anniversary, and it is currently displayed in the James C. Kirkpatrick State Information Center in Jefferson City, Missouri.

== Honors ==
Oliver is one of 46 or 47 eminent Missourians depicted in the Missouri Wall of Fame, a mural in Cape Girardeau, Missouri painted by Margaret Dement in 1995; the names were selected by "a panel of the Cape's leading citizens". On April 15, 2024, Oliver became the 50th person inducted into the Hall of Famous Missourians at the Missouri State Capitol. Despite a monument being constructed to honor her years before 2024, it had never been displayed until House Resolution 4926, sponsored by Dean Plocher, put it into the Hall of Famous Missourians.
