= Museum of Art and Archaeology =

Museum in Columbia, Missouri

- Established: 1961
- Location: 520 S 9th St, Room 1, Columbia, Missouri, United States
- Coordinates: 38.94446°N 92.32605°W
- Website: maa.missouri.edu

The Museum of Art and Archaeology is the art museum of the University of Missouri. It is located in the Ellis Library in Columbia, Missouri. The Museum's galleries are free and open to the public. The galleries are open from 10 am to 4 pm Tuesday-Friday and noon to 4 pm on Saturdays and Sundays. The galleries are closed on Mondays and University holidays. The Museum of Art and Archaeology receives support from the Missouri Arts Council.

== History ==
Starting in 1892 Walter Miller and John Pickard John Pickard began a Study Collection that ultimately would become the Museum of Art and Archaeology. The Museum moved to a larger space in 1976 at Pickard Hall. The galleries reopened on April 19, 2015 at Mizzou North after their previous building was closed due to nuclear radiation. They will move again in 2022, to an on-campus site.

== Collection ==
Selections from the permanent collection of more than 14,000 works of art and archaeological objects are displayed in five galleries. Temporary exhibitions based on the permanent collection or on loans from other institutions or private individuals are exhibited in three additional galleries. Casts of Greek and Roman sculpture, on loan from the Department of Art History and Archaeology, occupy a gallery on the first floor. The collection contains objects from a wide range of cultures with Greek, Roman, and Near Eastern art works and artifacts being especially strong.

== See also ==
- North Village Arts District
