= John Pickard (archaeologist) =

American art historian

- Born: October 12, 1858; Concord, New Hampshire
- Died: November 25, 1937 (aged 79); Columbia, Missouri
- Occupations: Professor of archaeology, art history, and Greek
- Board member of: Missouri State Capitol Decoration Committee

Academic background
- Education: Dartmouth College, Leipzig University, Athens University, Berlin University

John Pickard (October 12, 1858 – November 25, 1937) was an American professor of archaeology, art history, and Greek at the University of Missouri. He served on the Missouri State Capitol Decoration Committee in the early 20th century—his work survives in the architecture, sculpture, paintings, and stained glass of the Capitol. At the University of Missouri, he was the first chairman of the Department of Art History and Archaeology, acquiring and developing what would become the Museum of Art and Archaeology. His tenure at the school lasted over 40 years.

== Early life ==
John Pickard was born on October 12, 1858, in Concord, New Hampshire. He obtained two degrees from Dartmouth College in 1883 and 1886. Pickard studied widely in Europe, particularly in Rome, Athens, Leipzig, Munich, and Berlin.

== University professor ==
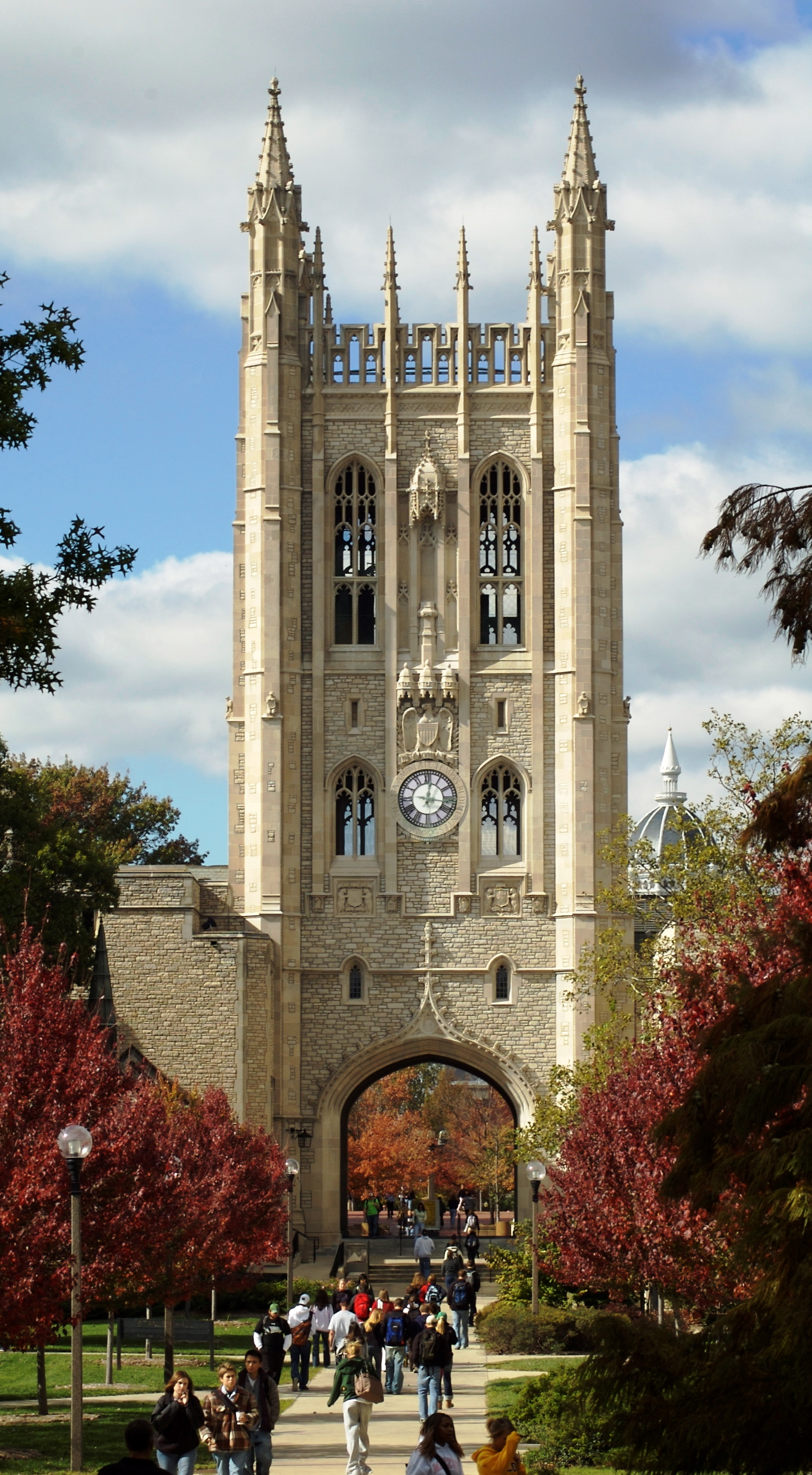
Pickard was the chief proponent behind the construction of the Memorial Union at the University of Missouri.

In 1892, Pickard became a professor of Greek at the University of Missouri. He later become the first chairman of the Department of Art History and Archaeology. A fellowship in the department is named after him. Pickard immediately began acquiring artifacts (especially plaster casts) for a museum, and was largely responsible for the construction of the Memorial Student Union. He finally retired in 1935. Pickard Hall on David R. Francis Quadrangle formerly housed the museum he founded, and is a National Historic District contributing property. Some of his papers are stored at the Archives of American Art.

== Other interests ==
As chairman of the Missouri State Capitol Decoration Committee, Pickard oversaw the creation of the Capitol's architecture, sculptures, paintings, and stained glass. Upon its completion in 1929, he authored The State Capitol of Missouri: A Description of Its Construction and Decorations. Pickard was an avid Freemason, holding membership in the York and Scottish rites. In 1926–27, he was Grand Master of the Grand Lodge of Missouri, as well as a leading influence in what would become the Missouri Lodge of Research. He has been called "Missouri's Apostle of the Beautiful."
