= Flag of Missouri =

U.S. state flag

Missouri
- Use: Civil and state flag
- Proportion: 7:12
- Adopted: March 22, 1913; 113 years ago
- Design: A horizontal tricolor of red, white, and blue, with the arms from the Great Seal of Missouri centered on the three bands. The Seal is bordered by a wide band of blue with 24 white stars. (Note: There are a total of 61 stars on the flag, including the 37 on the state seal: 24 stars in the cloud above the helmet, and 13 stars in the included Great Seal of the United States.)
- Designed by: Marie Elizabeth Oliver

The flag of the U.S. state of Missouri was adopted on March 22, 1913, when governor Elliot Woolfolk Major signed the State flag act making it official. Its design consists of a triband of three equal horizontal stripes colored red, white, and blue, with the state coat of arms in the center.

The design was created by Mary Elizabeth Oliver, a Cape Girardeau native. The red and white stripes represent valor and purity, respectively. The blue stripe represents the permanency, vigilance, and justice of the state. The three colors also highlight the French influence on the state in its early years.

== Statute ==
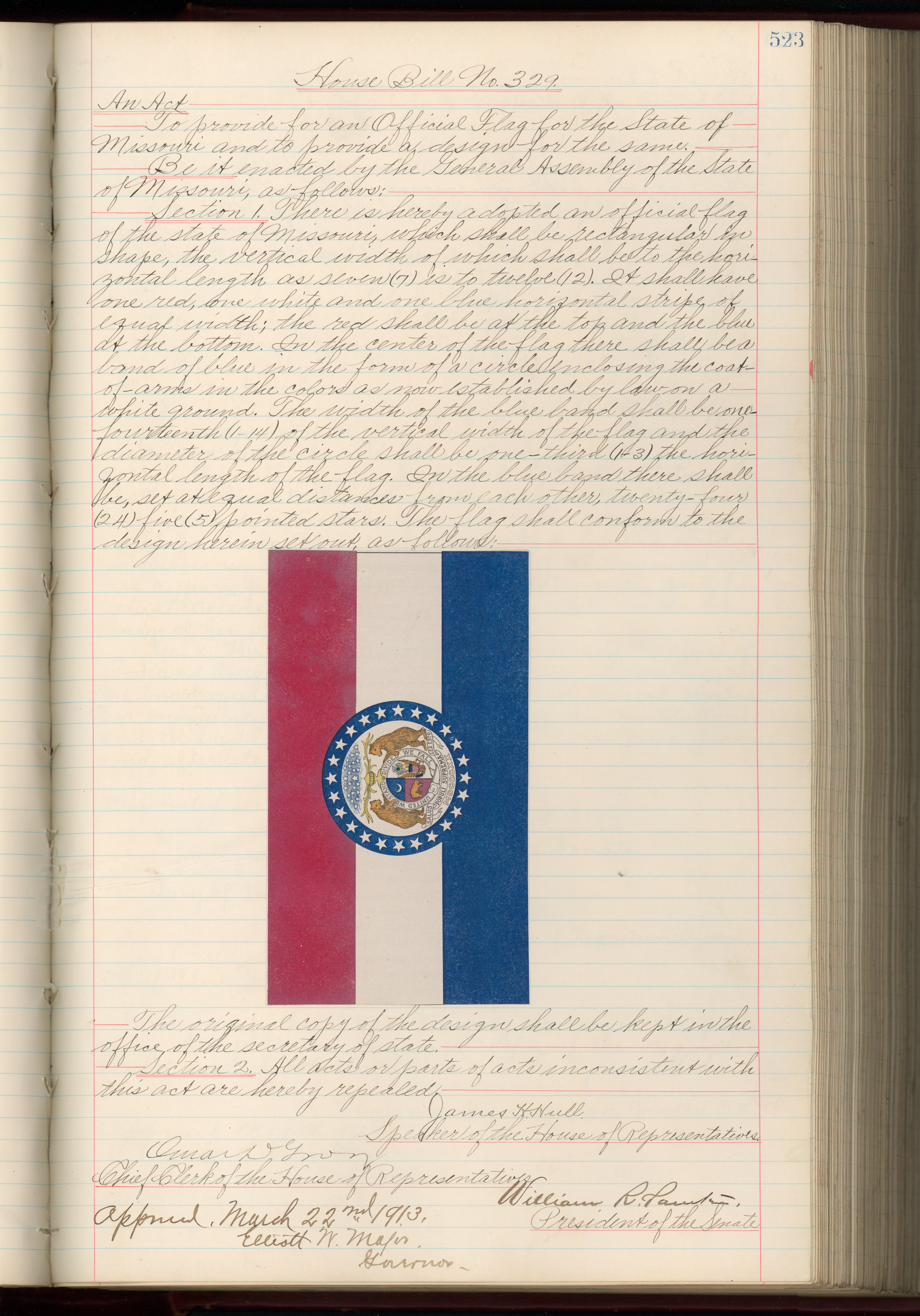
Scan of the original H.B. 329 from the Missouri Session Laws, designating the new Missouri state flag.

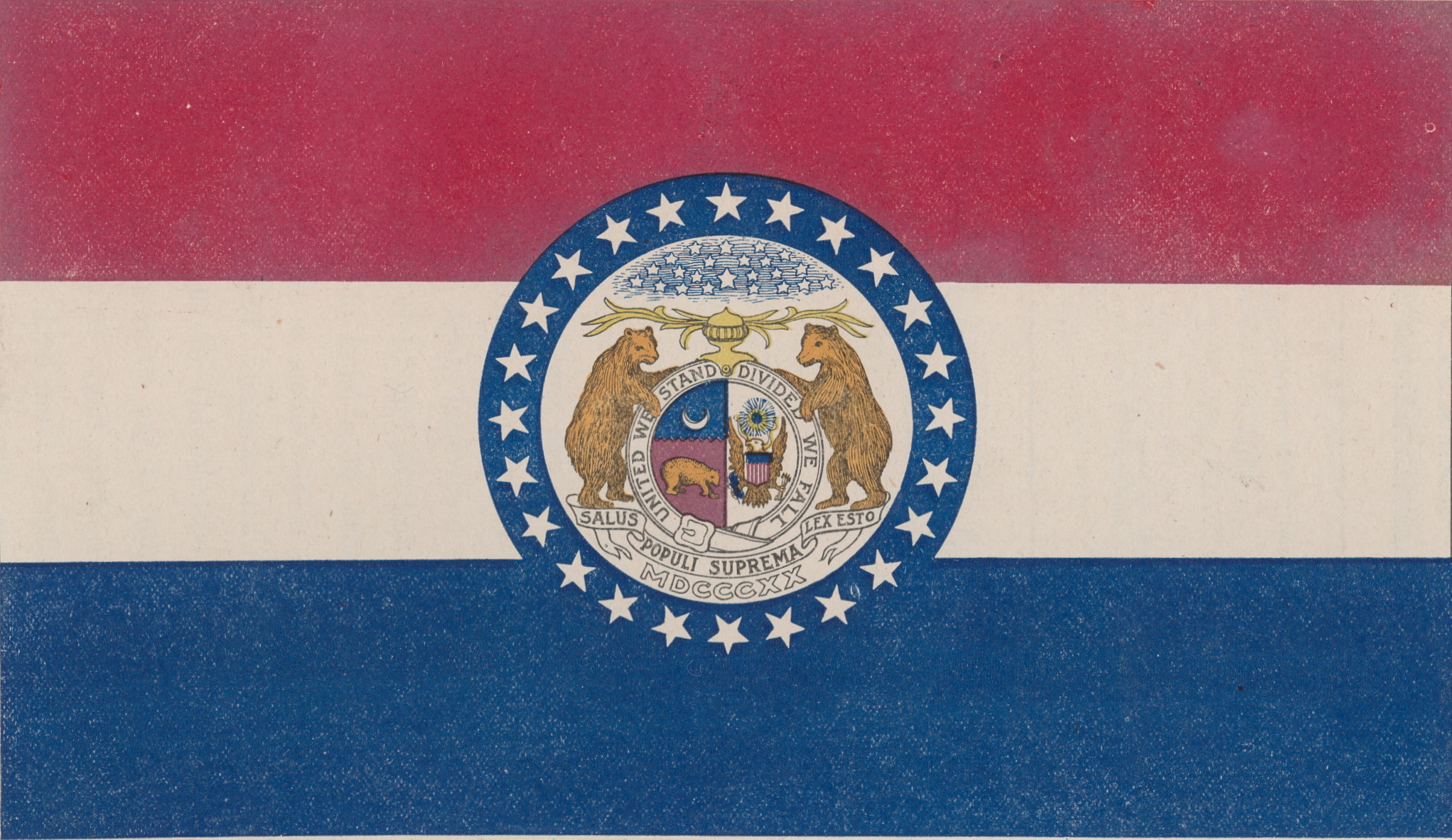
The original design of the Missouri state flag.

The 2024 Missouri Revised Statutes, Title II, Chapter 10, § 10.020 provides that the official flag of Missouri shall be:

be rectangular in shape, with its vertical width to its horizontal length in the ratio of seven to twelve; composed of three equal horizontal stripes of red, white, and blue; and bearing at its center a circular blue band enclosing the state coat of arms on a white ground. The blue band shall have a width equal to one-fourteenth of the flag's vertical width, the circle shall have a diameter equal to one-third of the flag's horizontal length, and the band shall contain twenty-four equally spaced five-pointed stars.

The statute further provides that "the original copy of the design shall be kept in the office of the secretary of state," and that the flag shall conform to the design illustrated in the official state publication (on adjoining page 154 of RSMo 1949).

=== Design of the coat of arms ===
The 2024 Missouri Revised Statutes, Title II, Chapter 10, § 10.060 defines the armorial achievement as follows:

Arms, parted per pale:

Dexter: Gules, the white or grizzly bear of Missouri, passant guardant, proper, on a chief engrailed azure, a crescent argent

Sinister: Argent, the arms of the United States, the whole within a band inscribed with the words "UNITED WE STAND, DIVIDED WE FALL"

Crest: Over a full-faced helmet grated with six bars or, a cloud proper from which ascends a star argent, and above it a constellation of twenty-three smaller stars, argent, on an azure field, surrounded by a cloud proper

Supporters are white or grizzly bears rampant and guardant, positioned on the right (dexter) and left (sinister) of the shield. The bears stand on a scroll inscribed with the motto "Salus populi suprema lex esto" and beneath it the Roman numerals "MDCCCXX."

== Design and symbolism ==
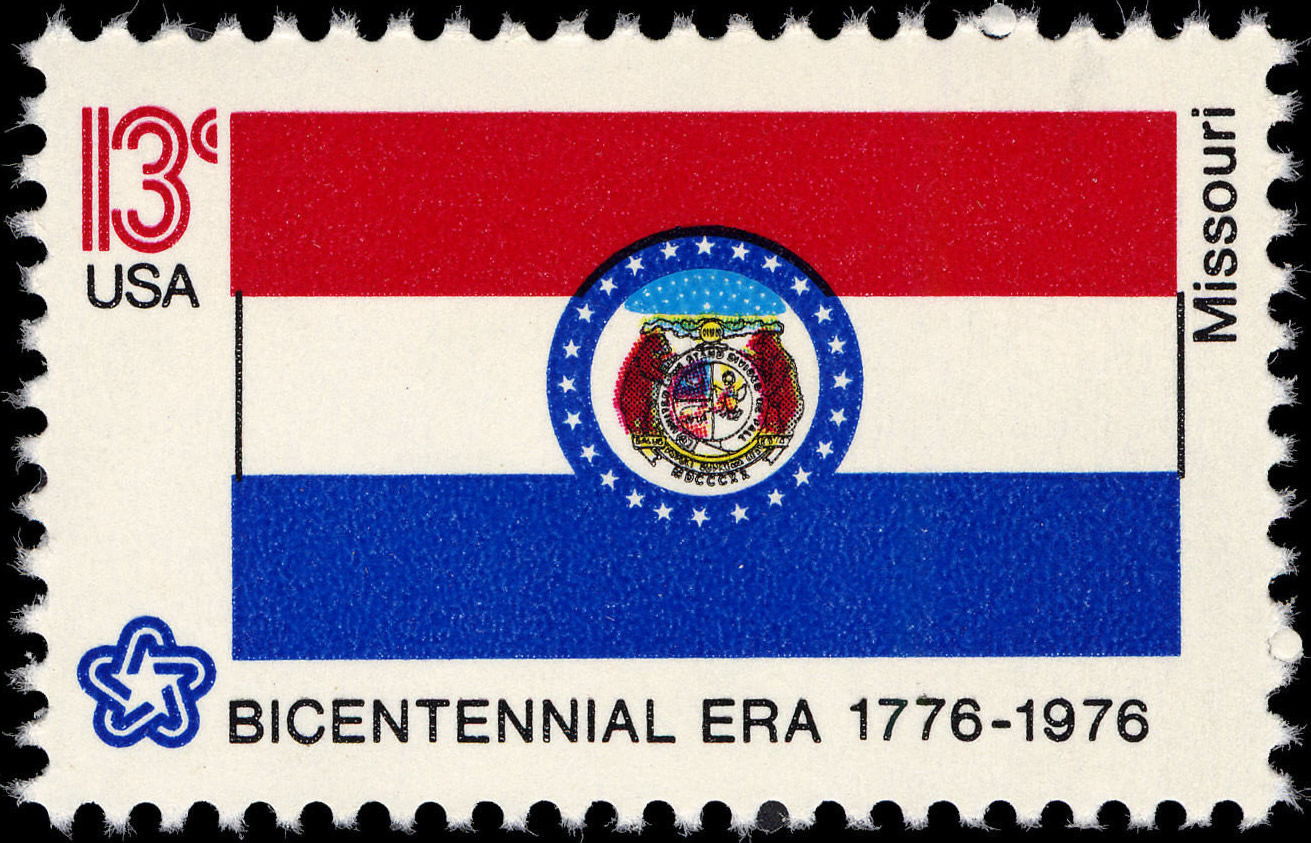
The Missouri state flag as depicted in the 1976 bicentennial postage stamp series.

The flag is a tricolor consisting of three horizontal stripes of red, white, and blue which resembles the flag of the Netherlands. These represent valor, purity, vigilance, and justice. The colors also reflect the state's historic status as part of French Louisiana. In the center white stripe is the seal of Missouri, circled by a blue band containing 24 stars, symbolizing Missouri's admission as the 24th U.S. state.

It is one of two U.S. state flags to feature a bear, the other being the flag of California. It is also one of nine U.S. state flags to feature an eagle, alongside those of Illinois, Iowa, Michigan, New York, North Dakota, Oregon, Pennsylvania, and Wyoming.

In 2001, the North American Vexillological Association surveyed its members on the designs of the 72 U.S. state, U.S. territorial and Canadian provincial flags. The Missouri flag ranked in the bottom 25, 48th out of the 72.

== History ==
=== Pre-Official flags (before 1913) ===
State flag described by Major-General Sterling Price, designed by Robert Wells (arms only).

On June 5, 1861, at the outset of the Civil War, General Orders No. 8, issued by Major-General Sterling Price, directed that each regiment of the Missouri State Guard adopt "the state flag." The order describe the state flag as made of blue merino fabric, measuring six by five feet, with the Missouri coat of arms in gold gilt on each side. These flags were to be mounted on nine-foot pikes.

In addition, mounted companies were to carry guidons, smaller flags of white merino, measuring three by two and a half feet, with the letters "M.S.G." in gilt.

Missouri did not have a state flag before this order was issued. The flag adopted by the regiments of the Missouri State Guard is not regarded as an official state flag.

A state flag was flown from the Missouri building at the Jamestown Exposition of 1907.

=== Current Flag (1913–present) ===
The Missouri state flag was designed and stitched in Cape Girardeau, Missouri, by Marie Elizabeth Oliver, the wife of former state senator R. B. Oliver. She began his flag project in 1908 as part of her volunteer activities with the Daughters of the American Revolution when she was appointed chairperson of the Daughters of the American Revolution committee to research and design Missouri's flag. Oliver researched state flags extensively. She wrote each state's secretary of state for information about how their state's flags had been designed and officially adopted. Her original design incorporated Missouri's coat of arms and was rendered as a painted paper flag by her friend Mary Kochitzky.

The flag was brought to the Missouri State Capitol in 1908 and bills to adopt the flag as the official flag of Missouri were introduced by Senator Arthur L. Oliver, her nephew, in 1909 and 1911. Both bills failed to pass in the House.

Holcomb flag proposal

A competing flag design, by G. H. Holcomb and referred to as the "Holcomb flag", was opposed due to its resemblance to the flag of the United States and its lack of Missouri symbolism.

Oliver's original paper flag was destroyed when the Missouri State Capitol burned in 1911. With Mrs. S. D. MacFarland, Oliver sewed a second flag out of silk.

Her design was adopted on March 22, 1913, when governor Elliot Woolfolk Major signed the Oliver Flag Bill. The flag design remains unchanged to this day.

The silk flag was kept by Marie Oliver until 1961 when her son Allen gave it to the state of Missouri. The flag was displayed until it began to deteriorate and was put into storage. In 1988, Secretary of State Roy D. Blunt issued a challenge to elementary students to raise money to restore the flag. The campaign was successful and the restored flag has been displayed in the James C. Kirkpatrick State Information Center in Jefferson City ever since.

The Oliver-Leming House, also known as the Home of the Missouri State Flag, was listed on the National Register of Historic Places in 1980.

== Other flags ==
None of these flags were ever adopted by the state legislature.

In 1839, the first state flag was made. It featured a silk white field with the states coat of arms painted in the center. The reason they chose white as the background is because the white fabric makes colors appear more vibrant.

During the 1844 Whig National Convention state delegates carried with the a 2 banner one was described as having the states coat of arms with "Missouri" in gold below it. The banner was made by the women of the state.

During the Civil War one of the Union regiments carried a state flag featuring a blue field with the coat of arms in white.

In 1886, a veterans parade was being held in San Francisco, California. During the parade a group of Missourians carried with them a state flag described as having a white field with the states coat of arms in the center.

In 1901, a committee was organized to buy flags for the up coming Louisiana Purchase Exposition. They brought 4 flags, 2 streamers, 1 national flag, and 1 state flag which had a blue field bearing the coat of arms of the state in the middle.

Before Marie Elizabeth Oliver started her project on the state flag there was an unofficial banner used by the state that bore the state's coat of arms.

On February 3, 1913 in Washington D.C. a huge suffragist parade was held. Before the march suffragist from the state displayed a banner bearing the state's coat of arms in the middle.

Reconstruction of an unofficial state flag from 1886

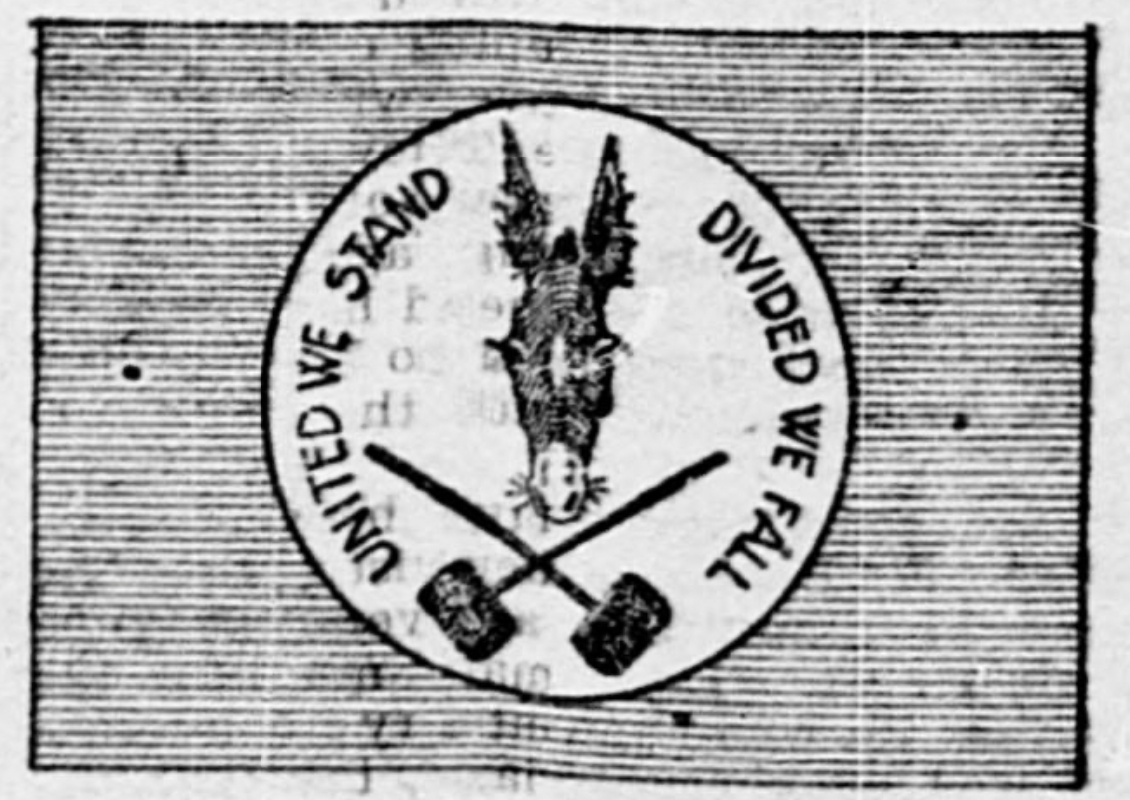
Missouri state flag proposed by The National tribune in 1909

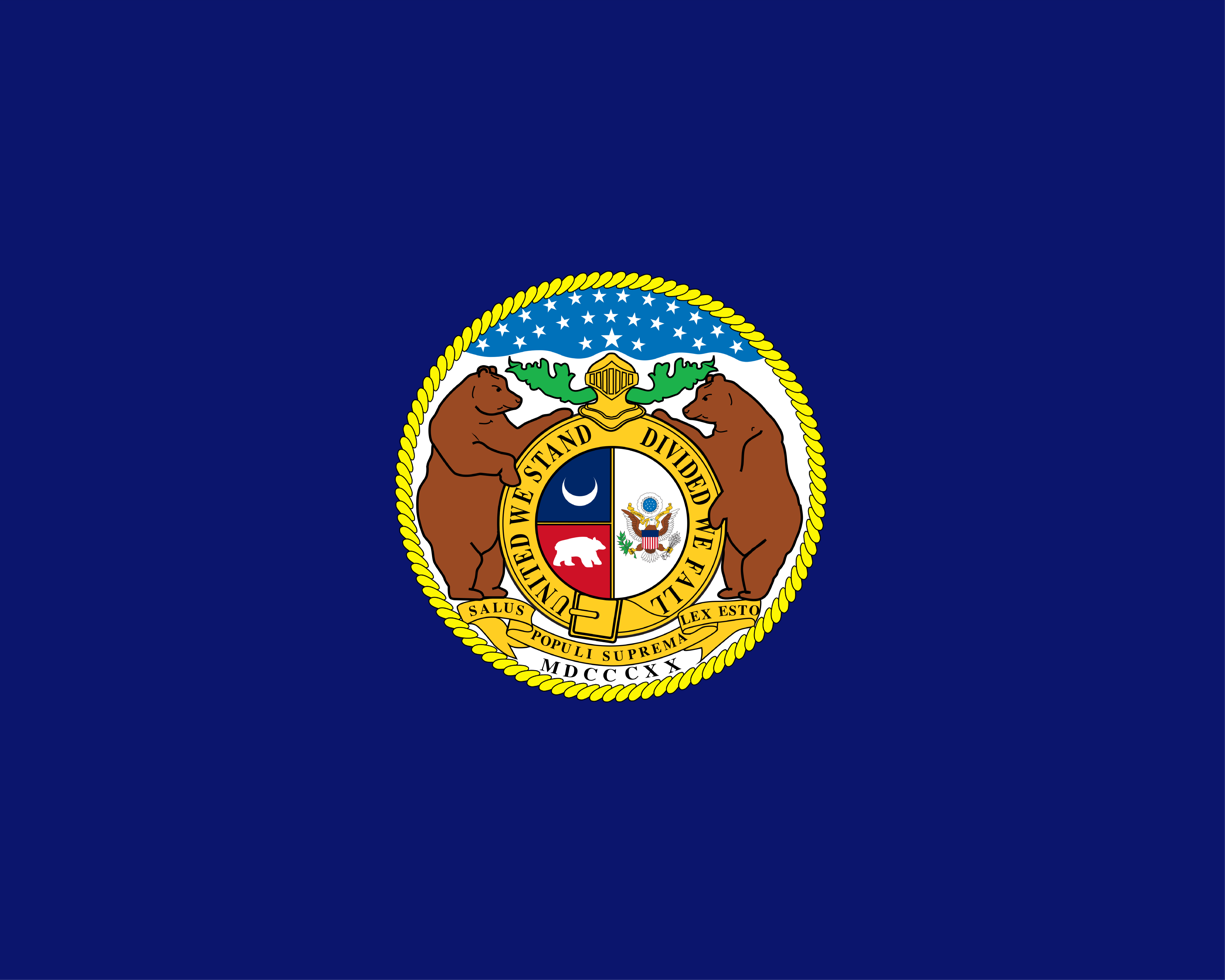
Reconstruction of the 2nd Missouri Infantry regimental flag, 1917

== See also ==
- List of flags by design
- List of Missouri state symbols
- List of U.S. state, district, and territorial insignia
- Flag of Kansas City
- Flag of St. Louis
