= Sergio Palleroni =

American architect

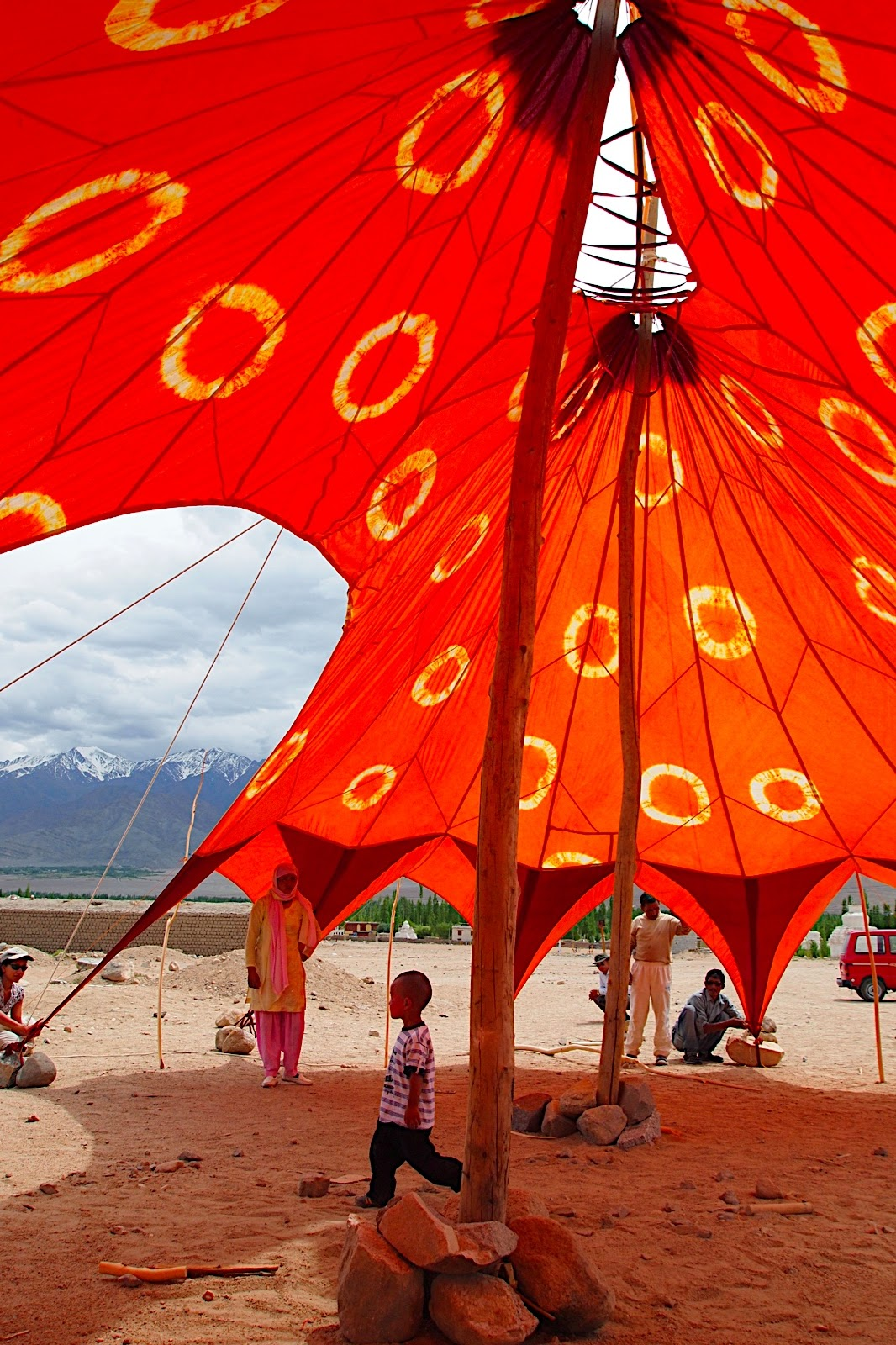
Peace tent/classroom at Druk White Lotus School, in Ladakh, India. Work of students of BASIC Initiative summer 2010.

Sergio Palleroni is an American architect and academic. He is a professor and fellow at Portland State University. He directs the Center for Public Interest Design (CPID). He received National Education Awards from the AIA, the NCARB, and the USGBC, and was inducted into the Interior Design Hall of Fame.

== Education ==
Palleroni was educated at the University of Oregon, where he received his Bachelors in Architecture, and at the Massachusetts Institute of Technology, where he earned his Masters of Science in History, Theory, and Criticism.

== Work ==
After obtaining his degree, Palleroni spent ten years working in Nicaragua, Mexico, and North Africa on projects sponsored by the United Nations and the World Bank. He then returned to the United States to teach at the University of Washington.

In 1986, he began a series of collaborations with Carlos Mijares Bracho and Gabriela Videla that established the term "public interest design". In 1987, Palleroni and Vidella founded ADE (Accion y Dessarollo Ecologico), an NGO that grew out of the practices of Paolo Freire and Ivan Illych, with whom they collaborated through their outreach organization, CED. The NGO was reconstituted as Comunidad AC in 1997 to allow it to fundraise for social interest projects in the region, many of which were constructed via international collaborations. These collaborations began in 1988 through University of Oregon. Fieldwork studios were formalized as an independent organization in 1995, as the BASIC Initiative (a service-learning program) while Palleroni was an associate professor at the University of Washington College of Built Environments. The outreach organization was founded in collaboration with David Riley, who, as of December 2023, runs the nonprofit Indigenized Energy Initiative based in Berkeley, California.

In 2004, Palleroni was invited by Professor Steven Moore and the Center for Sustainable Practices at the University of Texas to establish a fieldwork program. His work at UT, supported by a Luce Foundation grant, led to the creation of the Alley Flat Initiative.

In the fall of 2008, Palleroni accepted a position as a professor and senior fellow of the Institute for Sustainable Solutions at Portland State University. A new Center for Public Interest Design (CPID) was founded in March 2013, promoting public interest design. In 2014, the first graduate degree in Public Interest Design was approved by the Faculty Senate of Portland State University. The center supports a staff of five full-time faculty members, 21 graduate students, and fourteen international interns for eleven initiatives.
