= John Picard (architect) =

American architect and entrepreneur

John Picard (born 25 March 1957) is an American architect, builder, entrepreneur as well as a building efficiency and sustainability expert. He is currently the founder and CEO of John Picard & Associates, an environmental and sustainability consulting firm working with international clients.

He began his career as a designer, builder and entrepreneur. In 1990, Picard built his own home to operate completely "off the grid."

In the early 1990s, he worked with corporations like Interface Inc. and The Gap to develop and implement pioneering environmental energy efficiency policies and operational systems to improve efficiency and productivity. In 2012, he partnered with energy executives Tim Donovan and Steve Hightower to form HP Energy, an energy efficiency development company.
