= Missouri State Capitol =

State capitol building of the U.S. state of Missouri

- Missouri State Capital Building and Grounds
- U.S. National Register of Historic Places
- U.S. Historic district – Contributing property
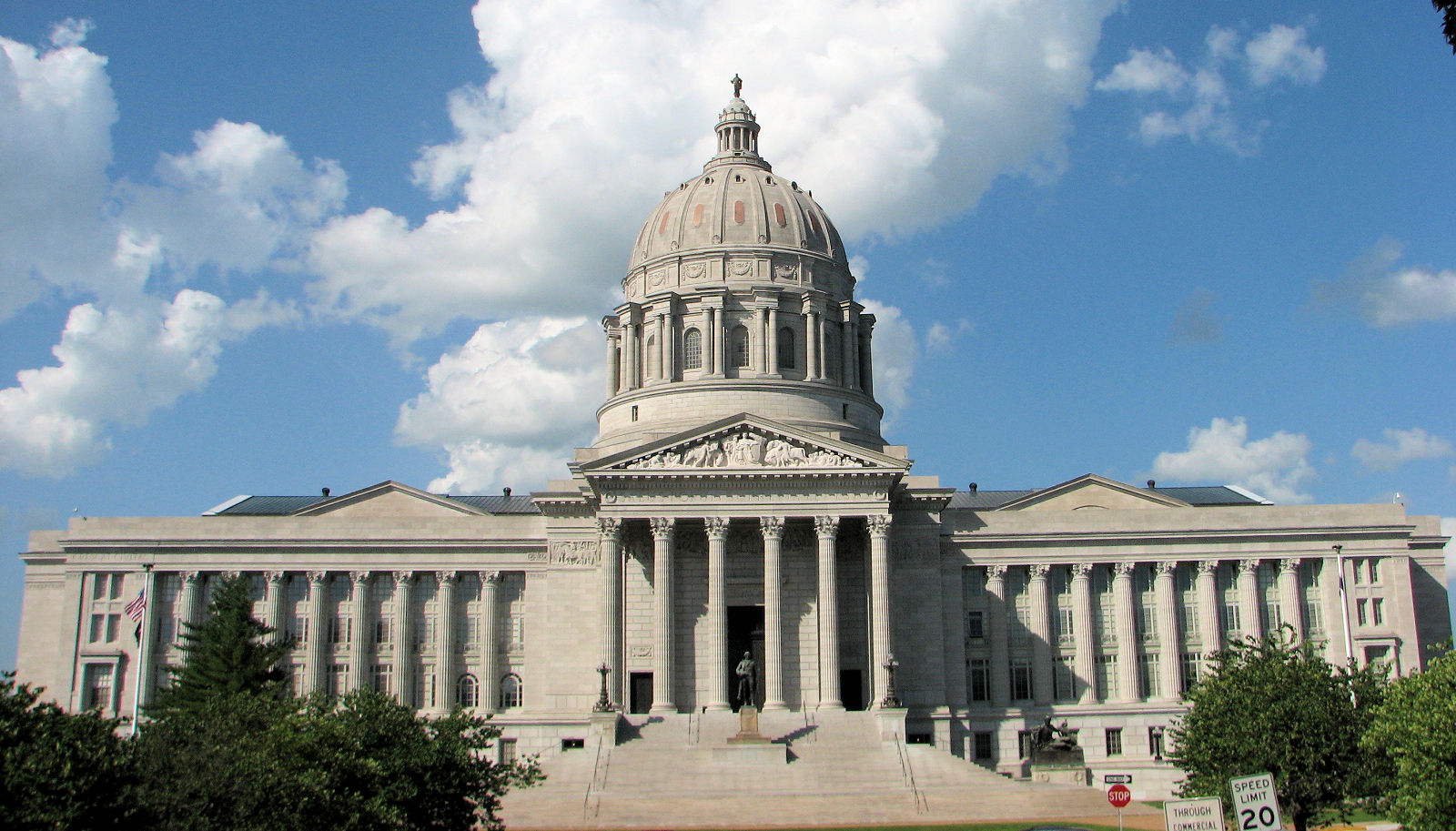

- Location within Missouri Location within the United States
- Interactive map showing the location of Missouri State Capitol
- Location: 201 West Capitol Avenue, Jefferson City, Missouri
- Coordinates: 38°34′45″N 92°10′22″W
- Area: 3 acres (1.2 ha)
- Built: 1917; 109 years ago
- Architect: Tracy and Swartwout
- Architectural style: Classical Revival
- NRHP reference No.: 69000096
- Added to NRHP: June 23, 1969; 57 years ago

The Missouri State Capitol is the home of the Missouri General Assembly and the executive branch of government of the U.S. state of Missouri. Located in Jefferson City at 201 West Capitol Avenue, it is the third capitol to be built in the city. (The previous two were demolished after they were damaged by fire.) The domed building, designed by the New York City architectural firm of Tracy and Swartwout, was completed in 1917.

In addition to the state Senate and House of Representatives, the capitol also contains offices of the governor, lieutenant governor, secretary of state, state treasurer, state auditor, and some administrative agencies.

It is individually listed on the National Register of Historic Places and is a contributing property in the Missouri State Capitol Historic District. The capitol is Jefferson City's leading tourist attraction. It is a destination for school groups who arrive by busloads, particularly during General Assembly sessions. Students fill the galleries to watch the Senate and House of Representatives in action.

== Description ==
=== Exterior and gardens ===
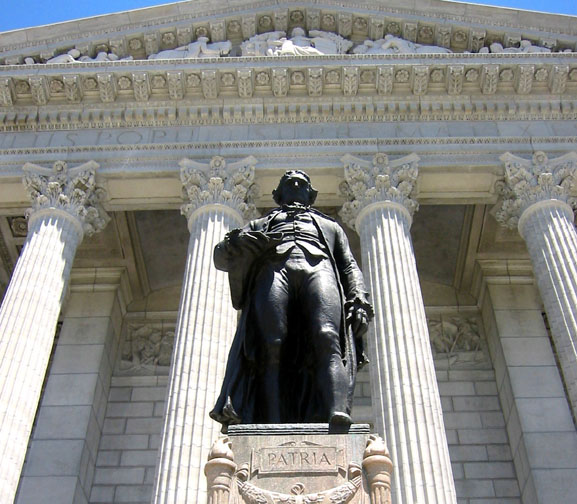
Statue of Thomas Jefferson, South Entrance

The exterior of the Missouri State Capitol is notable for its architectural features: the Baroque dome, loosely modeled after St. Peter’s basilica in Rome, rising 238 feet (73 m) above ground level, topped by sculptor Sherry Fry’s bronze statue of Ceres, the Roman goddess of agriculture; the eight 48-foot (15 m) columns on the south portico; the six 40-foot (12 m) columns on the north portico; the 30-foot (9 m)-wide grand staircase; and the bronze entrance doors, each 13 by 18 feet (4.0 m × 5.5 m)—at the time, the largest cast since the Roman era.

The north facade is embellished by a frieze sculpted by Hermon Atkins MacNeil illustrating the history of Missouri, a theme continued on the south facade by the artist Alexander Stirling Calder. The figures in the pediment over the main entrance were sculpted by Adolph Alexander Weinman.

Statuary is a prominent feature of the capitol’s grounds: heroic allegorical bronze figures sculpted by Robert Aitken (representing Missouri's two great rivers—the Mississippi and the Missouri), and a 13-foot (4 m) tall statue of Thomas Jefferson made by James Earle Fraser dominate the south entrance. The Sciences and The Arts Fountains, each with four representative figures, adorn the south lawn.

Sculptor Karl Bitter’s bronze relief, depicting the signing of the Louisiana Purchase by Livingston, Monroe and Marbois, and Weinman’s Fountain of the Centaurs are features of the north grounds.

=== Interior ===
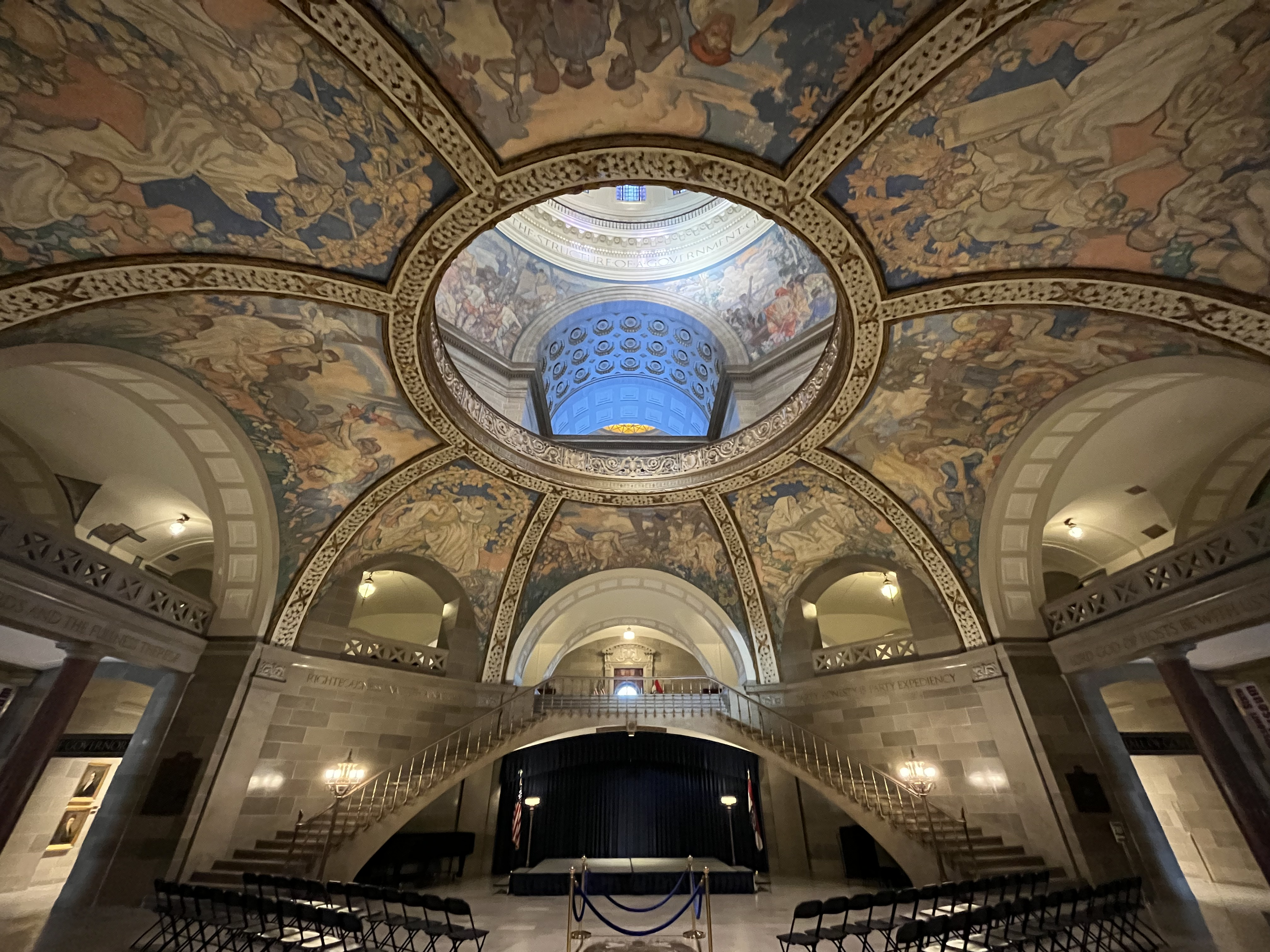
1st floor rotunda in 2025

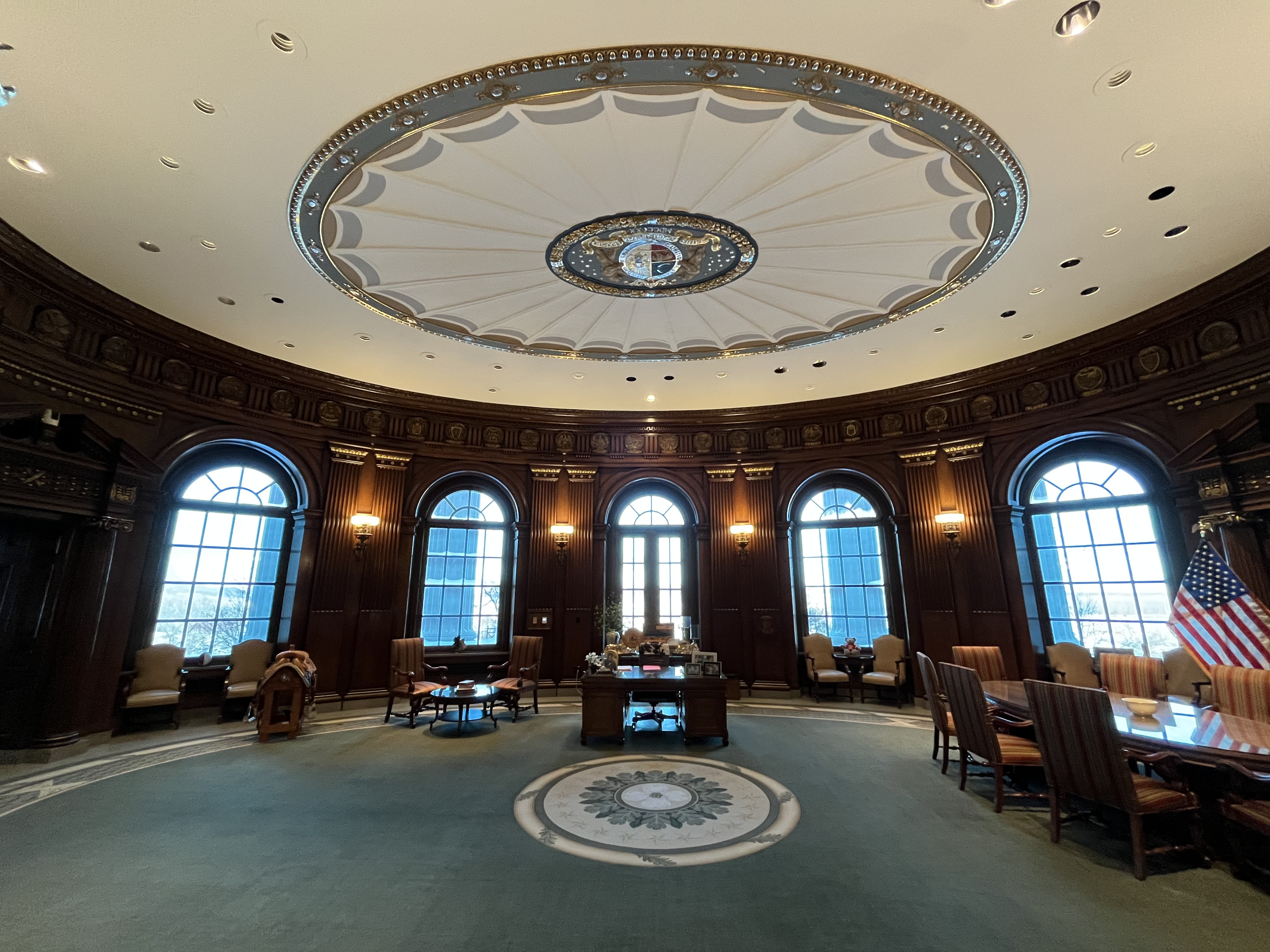
Governor's Office in 2025

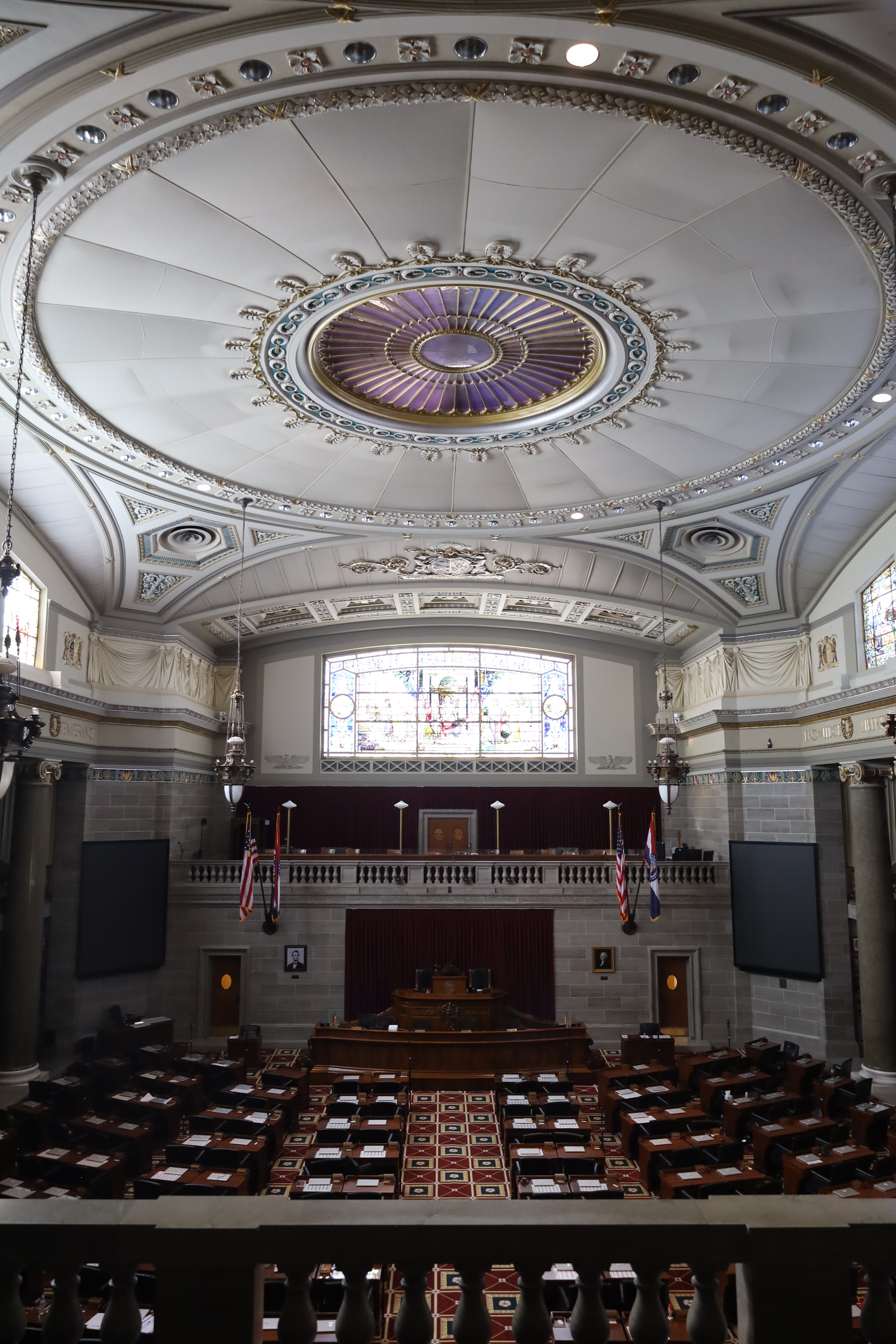
House of Representatives chamber in 2025

The capitol’s first floor, home of the State Museum, is embellished with mural paintings and statuary. A prime attraction is a series of murals painted by Thomas Hart Benton in the House Lounge. The grand staircase is flanked by large heroic bronze statues of Meriwether Lewis and William Clark, and the third-floor rotunda is the site of the Hall of Famous Missourians, a group of bronze busts of prominent Missourians honored for their achievements and contributions to the state.

A whispering gallery high within the dome, and a small viewing platform on the dome's roof beneath the statue of Ceres, are areas normally not open to the public except for school tours and other special tours.

== History ==
The present capitol, completed in 1917 and occupied the following year, is the third capitol in Jefferson City and the sixth in Missouri history.

=== Previous capitols ===
The first seat of state government was housed in the Mansion House, located at Third and Vine Streets in St. Louis and the second one was in the Missouri Hotel located at Main and Morgan Streets in St. Charles. St. Charles was designated as the temporary capital of the new 24th State in 1821 and remained the seat of government for five more years until 1826.

It was decided that the capitol should be located more in the center of the state and specifically that it should be located on the Missouri River within 40 miles (64 km) of the mouth of the Osage River. A group was sent out to survey various locations. The present location on top of the bluffs in current Jefferson City was chosen because it afforded the best view of the Missouri River of any place which they had seen within the limits prescribed by the Constitution.

The fourth state capitol (and the first in Jefferson City) was made out of brick, two stories tall, measured approximately 40 by 60 feet (12 m × 18 m), and took two years to complete. It was built for approximately $18,500 (equivalent to $526,434 in 2025). It was called the "Governor's House and State Capitol." This building burned a decade later in 1837. The site is now occupied by the present-day Missouri Governor's Mansion. It was designed by Stephen Hills (1771-1844), and modeled on his similar designs for the earlier first Pennsylvania State Capitol (1821-1897), built of red brick Federal style of architecture in Harrisburg, Pennsylvania on the east bank of the Susquehanna River. Architect Hills also designed other structures in the state such as the Academic Hall of the University of Missouri at Columbia; the remnant ruins of "The Columns" of six Greek Ionic style columns that still stand that survived the 1892 fire that destroyed the historic building are now the campus's landmark columns at the David R. Francis Quadrangle on the University's grounds.

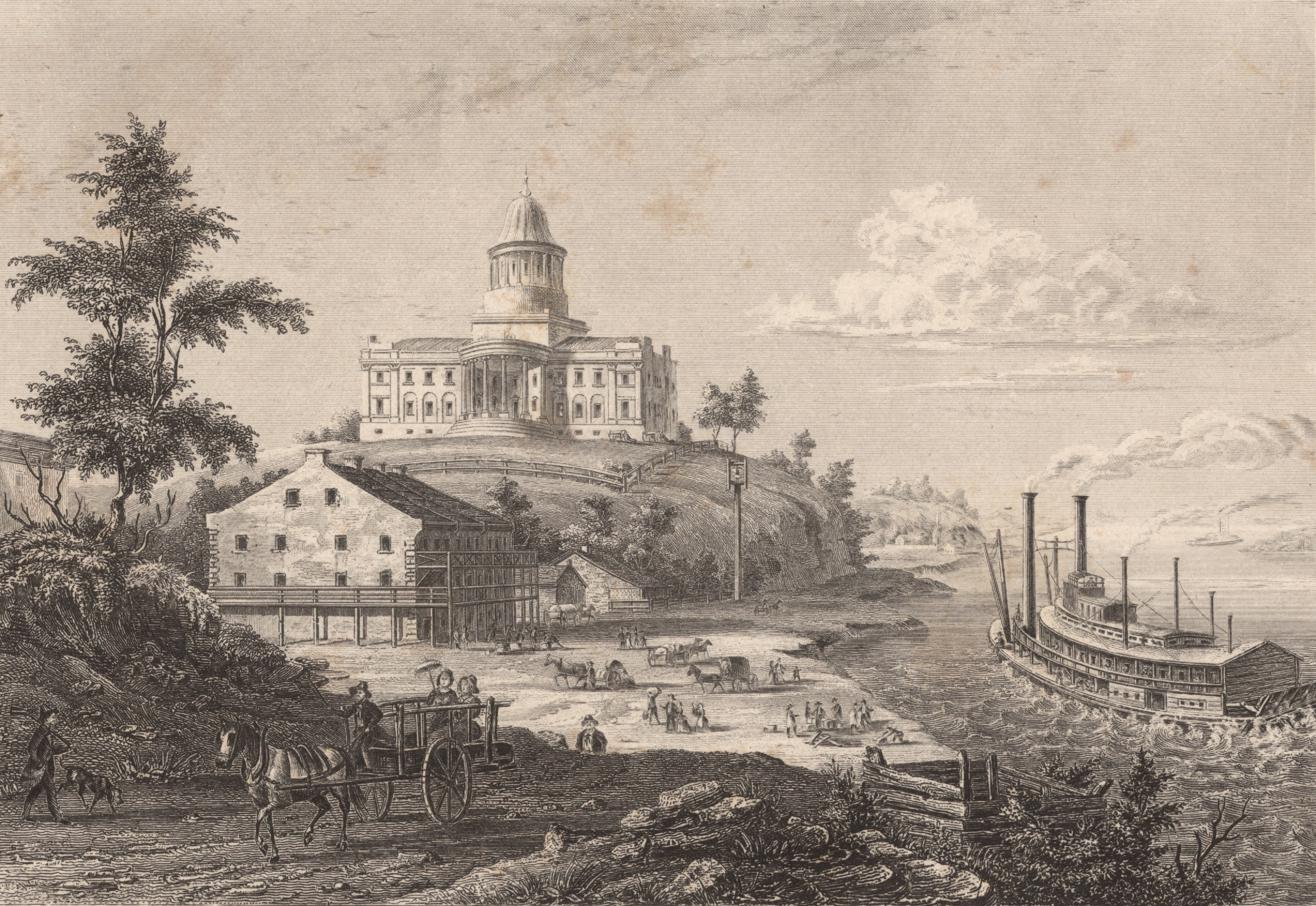
The previous capitol in 1850

The fifth capitol (which was at the current site) was completed in 1840 as designed by Stephen Hills for approximately $350,000 (equivalent to $11,287,500 in 2025), with some controversies and claims that there were bribes and kickbacks. This building also burned after 71 years on February 5, 1911 when it was struck by lightning. This building was approximately 50,000 square feet (4,600 m^{2}) and by 1911, was far too small to meet the then current needs of the legislators in the 1910s. Missouri State Senator William Warner (1840-1916), was quoted saying, "I have no tears to shed over the fact that the building has been destroyed as it was totally inadequate and not in keeping with the requirements of our great state". He died just before the new massive huge replacement State Capitol was completed and dedicated the following year in 1917.

=== Current capitol ===
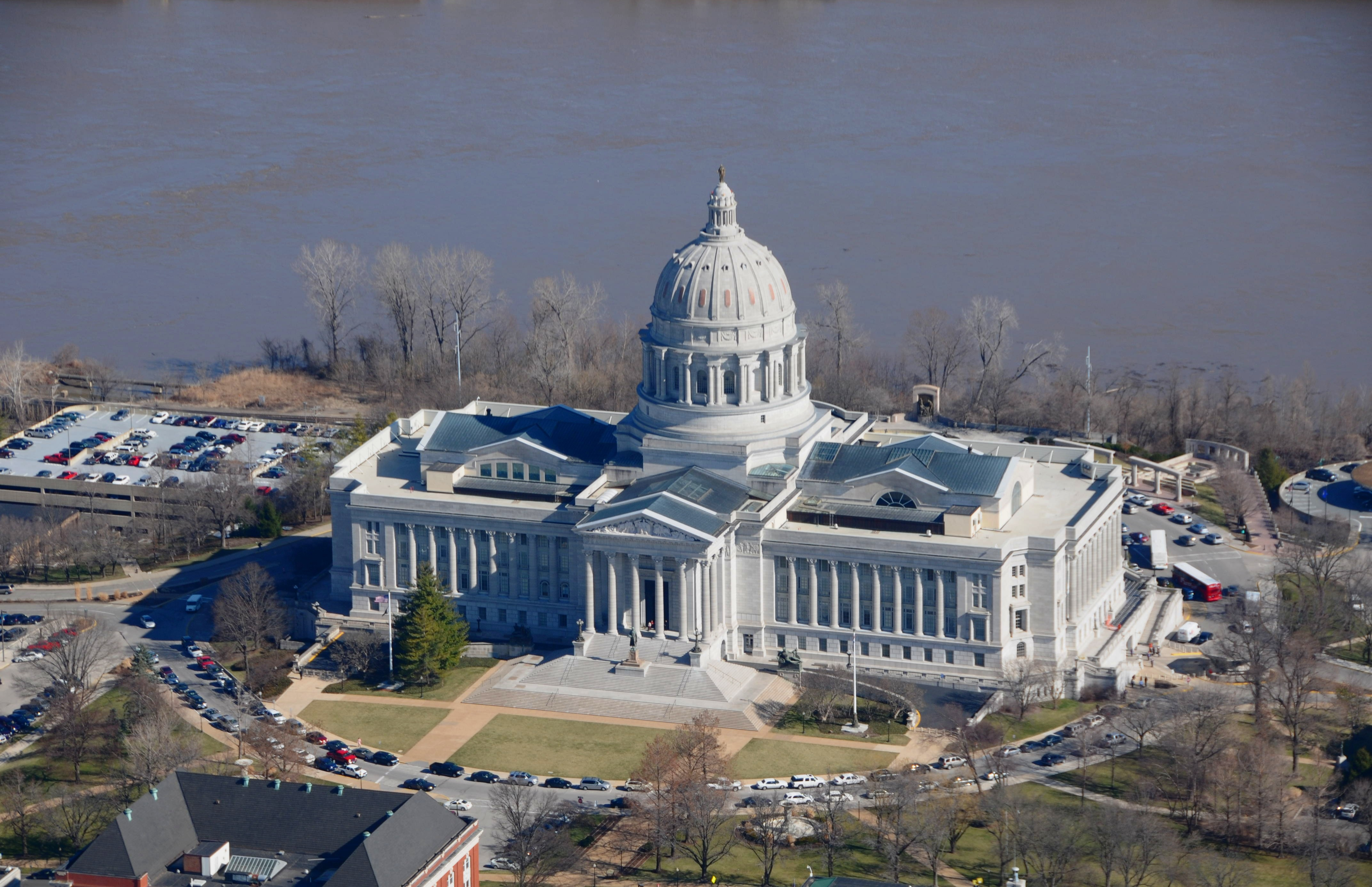
Missouri State Capitol showing the Missouri River in the background

The original new state capitol design and construction budget called for a building to be constructed for $3 million (equivalent to $103.66 million in 2025), with an additional $500,000 (equivalent to $17,276,786 in 2025) allocated for the site and furnishings. This was approved in a general election / referendum by the public by a three-to-one margin, however, the state miscalculated on incoming revenue projections, and ended up collecting $4,215,000 (equivalent to $145,643,304 in 2025). All of this money was eventually used for the entire monumental project, which is one of the reasons why the sculptures and artwork are of such high caliber of quality and beauty. Edwin William Stephens of Columbia served as chair of the Capitol Decoration Committee along with University of Missouri at Columbia art professor and archeologist John Pickard (1858-1937).

It was also decided that the architect would be selected from a design competition; names were redacted from the submissions so that there would be no local favoritism. A total of 69 architectural firms submitted for the competition, from which a short list of 11 were chosen. Tracy & Swarthout from New York City was ultimately selected.

The building is symmetrical in plan, giving equal symbolic weight to both legislative chambers of the House of Representatives and the state Senate (though the interiors and decoration of the two chambers differ greatly). The style makes many historical references to the national United States Capitol on Capitol Hill in Washington, D.C., as well as to ancient Greek and Roman temples; however, the typical column capital top is a unique variation on the canonical Corinthian style capital, replacing the acanthus leaves with local flora.

The stone for the exterior is a dense marble from Carthage, Missouri. Some of the finer details have eroded after 100 years of freeze and thaw weather climate cycles. The state has committed $30 million to study, restore, and prevent further deterioration. The building measures five stories high, 437 feet (133 m) long, 300 feet (90 m) wide in the center, and 200 feet (60 m) wide in the wings. The dome is 238 feet (73 m) high and the height of the wings is 88 feet (27 m). It includes 500,000 square feet (50,000 m^{2}) of floor space.

=== Rotunda chandelier incident ===
The chandelier being raised in 2007, after restoration from its fall a year earlier

In November 2006, the 9,000 lb (4,100 kg) dome chandelier, which had been lowered almost to the floor for maintenance, fell the remaining five feet. The chandelier was damaged by the impact and by the ornamental chains that fell on it. It was sent to a St. Louis company for repairs. Nearly a full year later, the chandelier was returned to Jefferson City and raised in the capitol. The upper lights were also restored, after they had been turned off for four decades due to light damage to the mural above. Created in 1918 by the Guth Lighting Company of St. Louis for a cost of $5,000 (equivalent to $107,024 in 2025), the chandelier cost $500,000 (equivalent to $798,531 in 2025) to be restored.

== See also ==
- List of Missouri General Assemblies
- List of state and territorial capitols in the United States

== Sources ==
- Hunter, Marie Nau, Missouri and Mississippi: Robert Ingersoll Aitken's Sculpture in Jefferson City, Missouri, Master's Thesis, University of Missouri-Columbia, 1996
- Kvaran & Lockley A Guide to the Architectural Sculpture of America, unpublished manuscript
- Pickard, John, The Missouri State Capitol: Report of the Capitol Decoration Commission, 1917–1928, Capitol Decoration Committee, Jefferson City Missouri, 1928
