= Missouri Folk Arts Program =

Arts organization in Missouri, U.S.

- Established: 1984
- Location: The University of Missouri, Museum of Art and Archaeology
- Website: Official website

The Missouri Folk Arts Program (MFAP) is a program of the Missouri Arts Council and the Museum of Art and Archaeology in the College of Arts and Sciences at the University of Missouri in Columbia, Missouri. Founded in 1984 under the auspices of Missouri Cultural Heritage Center, MFAP aims to bring cross-cultural understanding by documenting, sustaining, and sharing Missouri's living folk arts and folklife in collaboration with the citizens of Missouri.

== History ==
Missouri has had a tradition of the academic and avocational study of folklore, folkways, recipes, spells, and folk music for over 100 years, codified with the founding of the Missouri Folklore Society in 1906.

The University of Missouri, and Missouri, in general, have been sites for the study of American folk culture since the early 20th century, especially by folklorists, like Vance Randolph, who studied the Ozarks, and Professor Henry M. Belden, who studied American folk songs and ballad transmissions in Missouri.

In 1982, the Missouri Cultural Heritage Center was established at the University of Missouri and directed by Howard Wight Marshall, a professor in the Department of Art History and Archaeology. The Center found its permanent home in 1986 at the University of Missouri’s historic Sanford F. Conley House. The Center’s work consisted of multidisciplinary projects spanning rural sociology, vernacular architecture, cultural geography, historic preservation, archaeology, and folklore. Center staff also actively documented Missouri’s traditional arts and maintained a working archive of fieldwork materials. Staff and affiliated scholars curated traveling exhibits and smaller exhibitions for display in Conley House. The Center also served as a lending library of key books and essays associated with its research topics. In 1993, the Center was decommissioned during a round of budget cuts.

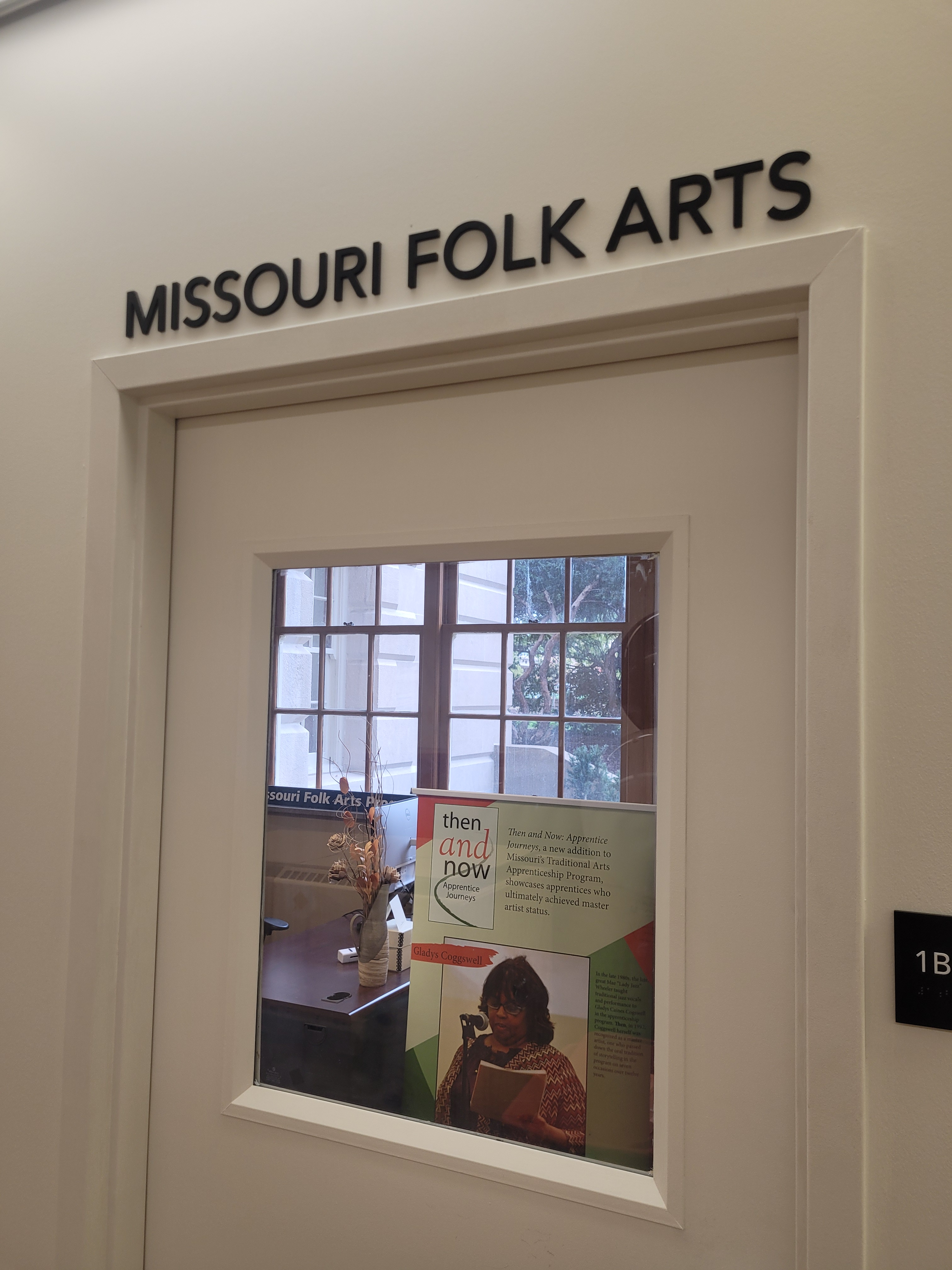
The Missouri Folk Arts Program office at the University of Missouri

Leaders at the University of Missouri’s Museum of Arts and Archaeology worked with Missouri Arts Council (MAC) executive staff to continue two public folk initiatives from the Cultural Heritage Center: the Traditional Arts Apprenticeship Program (TAAP), established in 1985, and a touring program of traditional artists. Under the auspices of the museum, these projects were subsumed under the newly formed MFAP. MAC provided operational funding through grants, and MFAP staff continued to secure support from the National Endowment for the Arts (NEA) for TAAP. MAC also launched a Folk Arts Project Grant pilot program in collaboration with MFAP, which was successfully implemented within five years, as the touring program was phased out. When the NEA’s Folk and Traditional Arts Program launched its national Infrastructure Initiative in 1997, MAC designated MFAP as its affiliated program to advance the organization’s objectives to promote the arts.

With the support of the Museum of Art and Archaeology, MAC, and NEA, the MFAP continues to coordinate the TAAP, support folk arts grant applicants and grantees, and collaborate regionally on outreach projects.

== Activities ==
The Missouri Folk Arts Program has attracted national attention for its long-lived traditional arts apprenticeship program, which encourages teams of mentors and mentees to sustain an array of Missouri traditional arts for future generations. In 2023, the MFAP staff served as advisers and presenters for the Smithsonian Folklife Festival’s focus on the Ozarks, featuring music, dance, craft—including quilts—and occupational traditions on the National Mall. MFAP is also involved with marking historic sites of legendary significance in the state of Missouri.

== See also ==
- Missouri Folklore Society
- Music of Missouri
- Missouri fiddling
- Poet Laureate of Missouri
- Folk Dance
- Story telling
