= Max Hunter =

American folk song collector (1921–1999)

Maxwell Franklin Hunter
- Hunter performing in White Springs, Florida in 1959
- Born: Maxwell Franklin Hunter; July 2, 1921; Springfield, Missouri, U.S.
- Died: November 6, 1999 (aged 78)
- Occupation: Refrigerator salesman
- Known for: Folklorist of the Ozarks
- Spouse: Virginia Mercer (m. 1939)

Max Franklin Hunter (July 2, 1921 – November 6, 1999) was an American folklorist who, while working as a travelling salesman, compiled an archive of nearly 1,600 folk songs from the Ozarks region of the southern United States between 1956 and 1976.

== Life and career ==
Hunter was born on July 2, 1921, to a family with deep roots in the Ozarks. He grew up in Springfield, Missouri, attending Baptist and Methodist church services and singing with his family. He married Virginia Mercer in 1939 and started working for her father as a refrigerator salesman.

In 1952, he began working for the John Rhodes Refrigeration Supply Company, traveling on a 150-mile circuit through the Ozarks. During his travels, he began using a tape recorder to record songs from people he met. At the Ozark Folk Festival circa 1956, he met folklorists Vance Randolph and Mary Celestia Parler, who saw his potential as a collector and shared some basic archiving skills.

Over his career, he recorded hundreds of singers, including Almeda Riddle, Ollie Gilbert, Fred High, May Kennedy McCord, Raymond Sanders, Jimmy Driftwood, and others who were active in the American folk music revival movement. He sometimes went to great lengths to convince others to let him record them, such as by helping them out with chores, which at one point included delivering moonshine. He also recorded by some estimates more than 14 hours of jokes and 1,100 proverbs.

Hunter was the last of the major Ozark ballad collectors, and defied the conventional wisdom of archivists at the time, who thought that such oral traditions had already been fully documented. His archival philosophy was to make absolutely no changes to the songs he collected, even to correct obvious errors.

In 1972, he gave his audio tapes to the Springfield-Greene County Library, ignoring the advice of friends who urged him to give them to an academic institution where he worried the songs would get buried. From 1998 to 2001, the archive was digitized by Missouri State University. Many of his recordings are now on file at the Library of Congress and other institutions.

Although he quit smoking later in his life, he died of emphysema on November 6, 1999, at the age of 78.

== See also ==
- Francis James Child
- Maud Karpeles
- Alan Lomax
- John A. Lomax
- Missouri Folklore Society
- Cecil Sharp
- John Quincy Wolf
