= McCord =

McCord may refer to:

== Places ==
=== Canada ===
- McCord, Saskatchewan
- McCord Museum, Quebec
- Mount McCord

=== United States ===
- McCord, Oklahoma
- McCord, Wisconsin
- McCord Bend, Missouri
- McCord Crossroads, Alabama
- McCord Village, an archaeological site in Wisconsin

== Other uses ==
- McCord (surname)
- USS McCord
- 3527 McCord, a Main-belt asteroid
