= Luella =

Luella may refer to:

- Luella, Georgia, U.S.
- Luella, Texas, U.S.
- Luella Garvey House a designer house in Reno, Nevada, U.S.
- Luella High School Locust Grove, Georgia, U.S.
- Luella Island, an uninhabited Canadian arctic island
- Luella, a fashion label started by Luella Bartley
- Luella, a 1983 album by jazz flautist James Newton
- Luella, a synonym of Sunella

== People with the given name ==
- Luella Bartley (born 1974), English fashion designer, magazine editor and former journalist
- Luella Bates (1897–1985), the first woman truck driver (American)
- Luella Buros (1901–1995), American painter
- Luella Clay Carson (1866–1933), former university president in Oregon and California
- Luella J. B. Case (1807–1857), American author, hymn writer
- Luella Costales, American politician and member of the Hawaiʻi House of Representatives
- Luella Creighton (1901–1996), Canadian novelist and non-fiction writer
- Luella Kirkbride Drumm (1872–1962), American politician
- Luella Johnston (1861–1958), American businesswoman, civic reformer, and suffragist
- Luella Klein (1924–2019), American obstetrician-gynecologist and professor
- Luella Law (born 1934), Canadian sprinter
- Luella Marciano, Northern Mariana Islander politician and educator
- Luella F. McWhirter (1859–1952), American philanthropist, clubwoman, and temperance leader
- Luella St. Clair Moss (1865–1947), American educator and suffragist
- Luella Miner (1861–1935), American educator and missionary
- Luella Mundel (1913–2004), Fairmont State College art department head blacklisted during the McCarthy era
- Luella Agnes Owen (1852–1932), American speleologist and geologist
- Luella A. Varney Serrao (1865–1935), American sculptor
- Luella Dowd Smith (1847–1941), American educator, author, and reformer
- Luella Totten (c. 1870–1950), American pianist, composer, and music educator
- Luella Twining (1871–1939), American journalist, labor organizer and socialist politician
- Luella Weresub (1918–1979), Canadian mycologist
