= Orgeval =

Orgeval is the name of two communes in France:

- Orgeval, Aisne
- Orgeval, Yvelines
