= McCord (surname) =

McCord (also rendered MacCourt, McCourt, McCoard, McCard, and MacCord) is an Irish and Scottish surname with origins having been found between Ayrshire, Scotland, but mostly in Airgíalla [circa 7th century AD] (modern day Irish counties of Louth, Tyrone, Armagh, and Monaghan). McCord/MacCord comes from Old Irish name "Mac Cuarta" or sometimes "Mac Cuairt", translating as "the son of Cuairt", a byname meaning "visitor" or "journeymen" or "son of Achilles". The town of Cappagh, County Tyrone in Irish translates to Ceapach Mhic Cuarta meaning 'Mac Cuarta's tillage plot'. It is very likely the name Mac Cuarta is a corruption of the Irish name Mac Mhuircheartaigh (septs of MacCurdy, and MacKurdy).

Notable people with the surname include:

- AnnaLynne McCord (born 1987), American actress
- Andrew McCord (c. 1754 – 1808), American politician
- Bill McCord (1916–2004), American radio and television announcer
- Bob McCord (1934–2016), retired Canadian ice hockey player
- Castor McCord (1907–1963), American jazz saxophonist
- Catherine McCord (born 1974), American fashion model and actress
- Charles McCord (born 1943), American news anchor and radio personality
- Darris McCord (1933–2013), former American footballer
- David McCord (1897–1997), American poet
- David Ross McCord (1844–1930), Canadian lawyer
- Dennis McCord (born 1949), retired American professional wrestler
- Dennis McCord (1952–2005), Canadian ice hockey player
- Frank C. McCord (1890–1933), US Navy commander
- Gary McCord (born 1948), American professional golfer
- Geoffrey Sayre-McCord (born 1956), American philosopher
- Harold McCord (1893–1957), American film editor
- Howard McCord (1932–2022), American writer
- Hugo McCord (1911–2004), American biblical scholar
- James W. McCord, Jr. (1924–2017), electronics expert and former CIA agent
- Jim Nance McCord (1878–1969), American politician
- Joe McCord, Tennessee politician
- Kent McCord (born 1942), American actor
- Leon Clarence McCord (1878–1952), US federal judge
- Louisa Susannah Cheves McCord (1810–1879), American writer
- May Kennedy McCord (1880–1979), American folklorist, columnist, radio host
- Myron H. McCord (1840–1908), US Representative from Wisconsin
- Quentin McCord (1978–2020), American Arena football player
- Robert McCord, Treasurer of Pennsylvania
- Ryan McCord (born 1989), Scottish footballer
- Scott McCord, Canadian voice actor and blues singer
- Thomas McCord (1750–1824), Irish-born Canadian businessman and politician
- Tim McCord (born 1979), American musician
