= Robert Mottar =

American photographer

Robert Mottar (October 29, 1919, in Springfield, Illinois – November 1967, in New York City) was an American industrial and magazine photographer, active 1950s–1960s.

== Early life ==
Robert Mottar was born in Springfield, Illinois on October 29, 1919, to Louise Ann Mottar (Lindrew) and University of Illinois Pharmacy graduate (1910) Samuel Mayo Mottar (b. 1889), a salesman for Squibb in Chicago and trustee of the University of Illinois. He had a sister Bonnie Louise Mottar born August 16, 1915. His mother remarried when Robert was about 10 or 11. He lived in Los Angeles and Baltimore in the 1940s, and in Oregeval, Paris and New York during the 1950s.

== Career ==
Robert Mottar, often credited as 'Robert M. Mottar', began his career as a staff photographer for The Baltimore Sun in the 1940s, and was invited to conduct a workshop in 1949 at the first Missouri Photo Workshop, before graduating to freelancer for business magazines including Fortune. He was also commissioned for stories on celebrities for mass-circulation magazines such as LOOK and LIFE. Mottar produced photographs of major building projects, technology and industry and made portraits of major players. Known for accepting dangerous and challenging architecture commissions, in 1959, he documented the building of the 28 Liberty Street, at one point assembling all of the construction workers (at a labour down-time cost of $10,000) for a multi-storey vertical panorama in which the grid structure of the steel and reinforced concrete facade of the skyscraper forms dozens of frames, each containing twenty or so cheering workers.

His near-silhouette against blank sky of a dogman standing on a girder being lifted by a crane featured in the world-touring The Family of Man, cropped to a tight vertical and mounted floor-to-ceiling to cover an entire structural column in the exhibition space at the Museum of Modern Art showing January 24–May 8, 1955. The Family of Man was seen by 9 million visitors worldwide and is now on show in perpetuity at Clervaux Castle in Luxembourg. He was represented in two additional exhibitions at the Museum of Modern Art; MoMA; Photographs from the Museum Collection, November 26, 1958 – January 18, 1959; and 70 Photographers Look at New York, November 27, 1957 – April 15, 1958.

== Photography for universities ==
Mottar's portraits preserve the appearance of many American academics and intellectuals, and some from Europe.

In the collection of Johns Hopkins University are Mottar’s photographs of inventors and entrepreneurs, especially in the television industry, where he also photographed academics, campus views and student life, production of the JHU Science Review television program, and on one occasion, scenes of sixth-grade students using a mock-up television studio.

His portraits made at Johns Hopkins include John Allen Austin, Harold Ingle, Arthur Oncken Lovejoy, Leo Spitzer, Alex Quiroga, Ferdinand J. Hamburger, James William Perry Jr., Ben Wolfe, Alphonse Chapanis, Henry Carrington Lancaster, Ernst Cloys Laurence Hall Fowler, Robert Lowell and Lowell Jacob Reed, Sheldon Keith Spalding (1957), Lyn D. Poole (1957), William Bennett Kouwenhoven (1950), Frank Vigor Morley (1953), William Moore Passano (1956), Edward Russel Hawkins (1950), Alexander Graham Christie (1950), Leo Orville Forkey (1950), George Friederic Wislicenus (1950), Francis Henry Horn (1950), Robert Freedman (1956), Franco Dino Rasetti (1953), Eben Francis Perkins III (1956), Theodore McKeldin (1956), Audrey Smid (1956), Sidney Painter (1954), John Charles Hubbard (1952), Ronald Taylor Abercrombie (1952), Ralph Knieriem Witt (1951), Robert Fenwick (1951), John Lehman (1951), and Lowell Jacob Reed on his farm in New Hampshire (1953).

In 1952 Mottar made portraits of alumni emeritus professors at Princeton University in their academic environments that were published in The Princeton Alumni Weekly and exhibited in 1953 in the Princetoniana Room of the University Library: Henry Norris Russell, Astronomy; Charles Rufus Morey, Art and Archaeology; Robert Russell Wicks, Dean of the University Chapel, Arthur Maurice Greene, Dean of Engineering; William Starr Myers, Politics; Charles Grosvenor Osgood, Belles Lettres; Frank Jewett Mather Jr., Art and Archaeology; Gordon Hall Gerould, Belles Lettres; Edward Samuel Corwin, Jurisprudence; Thomas Jefferson Wertenbaker, American History; George Wicker Elederkin, Art and Archaeology; Gilbert Chinard, French Literature; George Harrison Shull, Botany and Genetics.

During the 1950s, Mottar accompanied University of Arkansas folklorist Mary Celestia Parler undertaking the Folklore Research Project (1949–1965). The photographs feature Mary Celestia Parler and others active in collecting folklore, as well as the subjects of Ozark folklore studies.

== Overseas commissions ==
Overseas Mottar worked between Oregeval, Paris and New York where he was represented by Scope Associates. There, Mottar photographed Andre Gustave Parodi at the Swiss embassy in Rome, Russell Baker in London (1953), Mark R. Lazarus in Oxford (1953), Ulrich Ernst Von Gienanth in Eisenberg (1954), John Richard Cary in Munich (1954), Francis Torrance Wiliamson in the US embassy, Rome (1954), Ludwig Edelstein in Oxford (1954), Tom Edward Davis and Thomas Southcliffe Ashton at the London School of Economics (1953), Thomas Watkins McElhiney in Berlin (1954), Arthur Kurtz Myers in Geneva (1953), Frank Vigor Morley in London (1953).

Mottar was a member of the American Society of Magazine Photographers (ASMP).

== Personal life ==
In March 1947, Mottar married Mary Carlile Boyd in Reno, Nevada and they lived in Westport. They had three children, Mary Mottar (1947–1955), Jill Mottar, born 1948, and Peter Mottar, born 1951. The marriage ended in divorce in 1956 with Mary winning full custody of the couple's two children.

== Exhibitions ==
- Portraits of alumni emeritus professors of Princeton University, Princetoniana Room of the University Library, 1953
- The Family of Man, Museum of Modern Art, January 24–May 8, 1955, the touring worldwide.
- 70 Photographers Look at New York, Museum of Modern Art, November 27, 1957 – April 15, 1958.
- Photographs from the Museum Collection, Museum of Modern Art, November 26, 1958 – January 18, 1959

== Collections ==
- Museum of Modern Art, New York.
- Princeton University Library.
- Mary C. Parler Photographs Collection (MC896), part of the Arkansas Folklore Collection at the University of Arkansas Libraries Special Collections
- Clervaux Castle, permanent display of The Family of Man.
- Johns Hopkins University Sheridan Libraries.
- Maryland Historical Society, Photograph Collection Inventory List, Special Collections Department.
