= Music of Missouri =

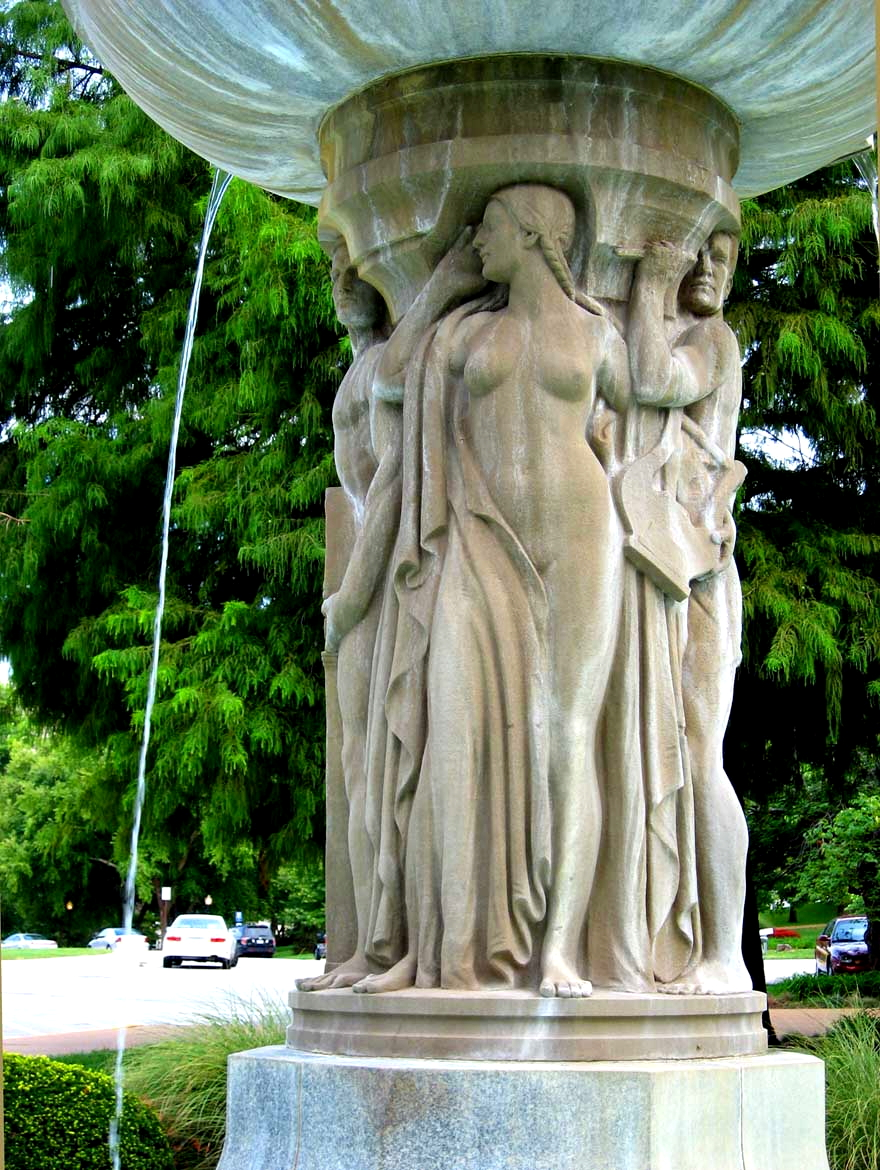
An allegorical figure of music is on The Arts Fountain at the Missouri State Capitol.

Music of Missouri has a storied musical history. Missouri has had major developments in several popular music genres and has been the birthplace or career origin of many musicians. St. Louis was an important venue for early blues, jazz, country, and bluegrass. Kansas City has had famous performers such as Charlie Parker, Count Basie (New Jersey), Lester Young, and the distinct style of Kansas City jazz. Ragtime made influence in the city of Sedalia, Missouri, due to Scott Joplin and his publisher John Stark, and through Missouri native James Scott.

Rock and roll pioneers Big Joe Turner and Chuck Berry were born in Kansas City and St. Louis, respectively, and folk singer Ella Jenkins was born in St. Louis. Hillbilly music developed in the Ozarks of southern Missouri, and from 1955 to 1961, Springfield was home to some of the first national country music programs on American television. Since the 1980s, Branson, Missouri has emerged as a country music tourist mecca. In the 1990s, St. Louis area band Uncle Tupelo blended punk, rock, and country-influenced music styles with raucous performances and became pioneers of alt-country. Both St. Louis and Kansas City also have active hip-hop scenes; Tech N9ne was born in Kansas City and Eminem in St. Joseph, and Nelly and the St. Lunatics got their start in St. Louis. Sheryl Crow is from Kennett, Missouri and attended the University of Missouri School of Music. Sara Evans came from Howard County.

In 1987, the Fiddle was selected as the state instrument of Missouri.

== Folk music ==
Missouri fiddling is a style of folk fiddling that developed in the 19th and 20th centuries. Howard Wight Marshall, historian has been active in the preservation of this art form and has published several full length volumes on the topic.

== Blues ==
Country blues singer and songwriter Lottie Kimbrough was born in West Bottoms, Kansas City, Missouri.

== Classical ==
The St. Louis Symphony is one of the oldest orchestras in the United States. The University of Missouri School of Music was established in 1917 in Columbia, Missouri and has thousands of alumni.

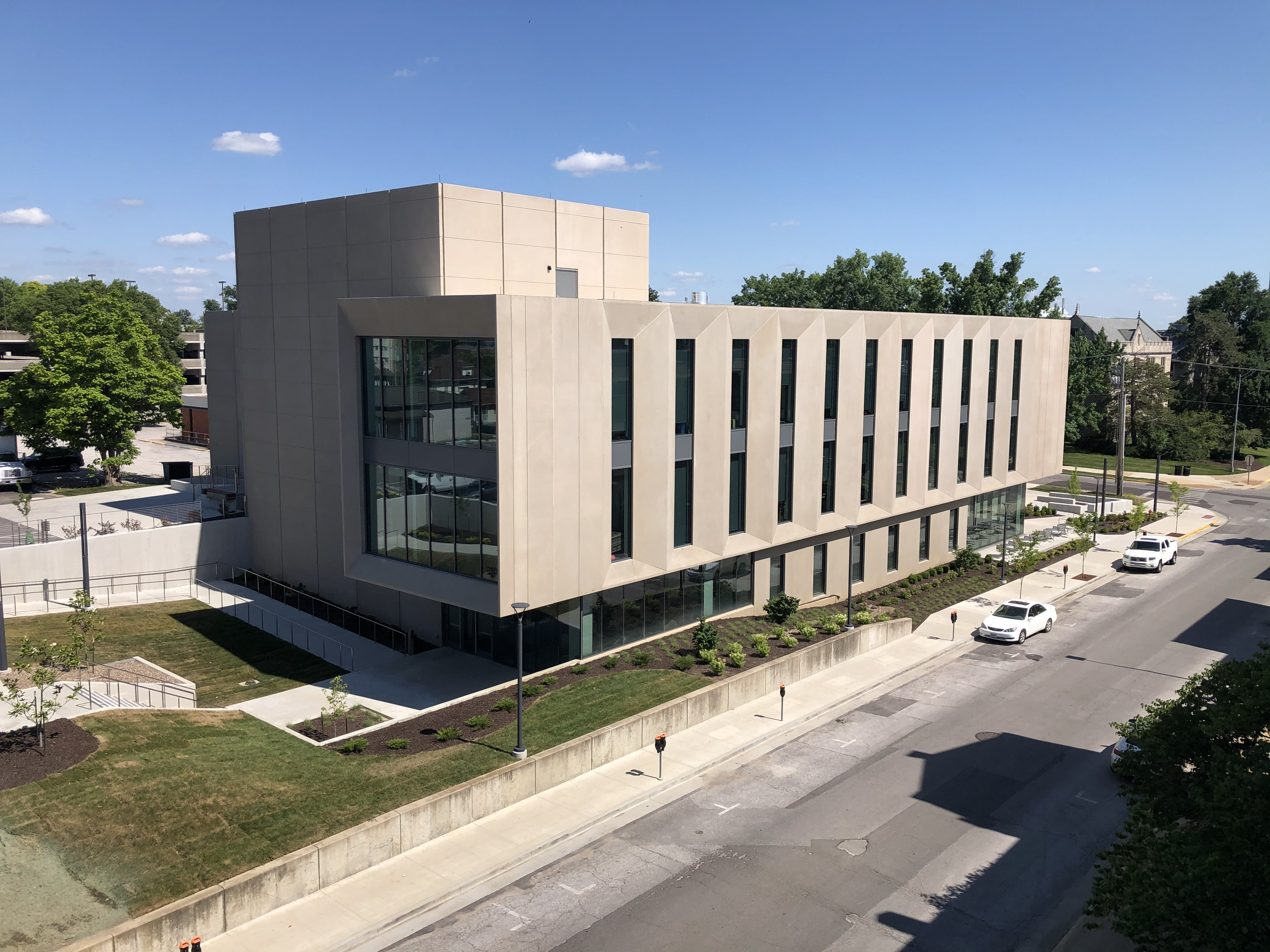
The Sinquefield Music Center part of the University of Missouri School of Music in Columbia, Missouri.

== Jazz ==
Kansas City and St. Louis are "cradles of jazz" along with New Orleans, Chicago, Pittsburgh, Philadelphia, and New York City.

Jazz artists from Missouri include Dixieland jazz and ragtime clarinetist, composer, and bandleader Wilbur Sweatman; trumpeter, saxophonist, accordionist, and bandleader Charlie Creath; bebop saxophonist and composer Charlie Parker; tenor saxophonists Coleman Hawkins, Ben Webster, and Jimmy Forrest; pianist and bandleader Bennie Moten; trumpeters Shorty Baker, Clark Terry, Louis Metcalf, and Baikida Carroll; violinist Eddie South; alto saxophonist, arranger, and composer Lennie Niehaus; saxophonist, clarinetist, arranger, composer, and bandleader Oliver Nelson; clarinetist Pee Wee Russell; double bassist Wendell Marshall; trombonists Joseph Bowie and Melba Liston; alto saxophonists Luther Thomas and Jimmy Woods; saxophonist and composer Ahmad Alaadeen; guitarists Grant Green, Pat Metheny, and Norman Brown (Louisiana); drummer Phillip Wilson; organists Wild Bill Davis, Milt Buckner, and Charles Kynard; jazz fusion and smooth jazz musician Bob James; and singers Anita O'Day and R&B singer Oleta Adams.

St. Louis's Gaslight Square entertainment district was an important area for jazz from the mid-1950s to 1960s. Jazz club Peacock Alley was the site of Miles Davis's recording of Miles Davis Quintet at Peacock Alley in 1956. The Black Artists' Group was a multidisciplinary art collective in St. Louis from 1968 to 1972 that fostered jazz and the Black Arts Movement in the city. BAG inspired the foundation of Human Arts Ensemble.

By the 1920s, Kansas City was the geographical center of the vaudevillian Orpheum circuit, which included live music.

Kansas City jazz is a riff-based and blues-influenced sound developed in jam sessions in the crowded clubs of the 18th and Vine neighborhood. Many jazz musicians of the 1930s and 1940s lived or got started here, including Charlie Parker, Count Basie, and Lester Young. Kansas City jazz in the 1930s marked the transition from big bands to the bebop influence of the 1940s. The 1979 documentary The Last of the Blue Devils portrays this era in interviews and performances by local jazz figures. Kansas City Jazz Orchestra is big band style.

Due to this musical legacy, U.S. Representative Emanuel Cleaver said 18th and Vine is America's third most recognized street after Broadway and Hollywood Boulevard. In 2018, UNESCO designated Kansas City its first and only City of Music in the US, in "recognition of [Kansas City's] investment and commitment to music, arts, and creativity as a driver of urban economic development", including the city's $7 million budget for improving the 18th and Vine Jazz District in 2016.

== Soul/R&B ==
Ann Peebles, Fontella Bass, Angela Winbush, Barbara Carr, David Peaston, Jackie Ross, Reggie Young, Oleta Adams, Akon and SZA were from Missouri.

== Rock, heartland rock and metal ==
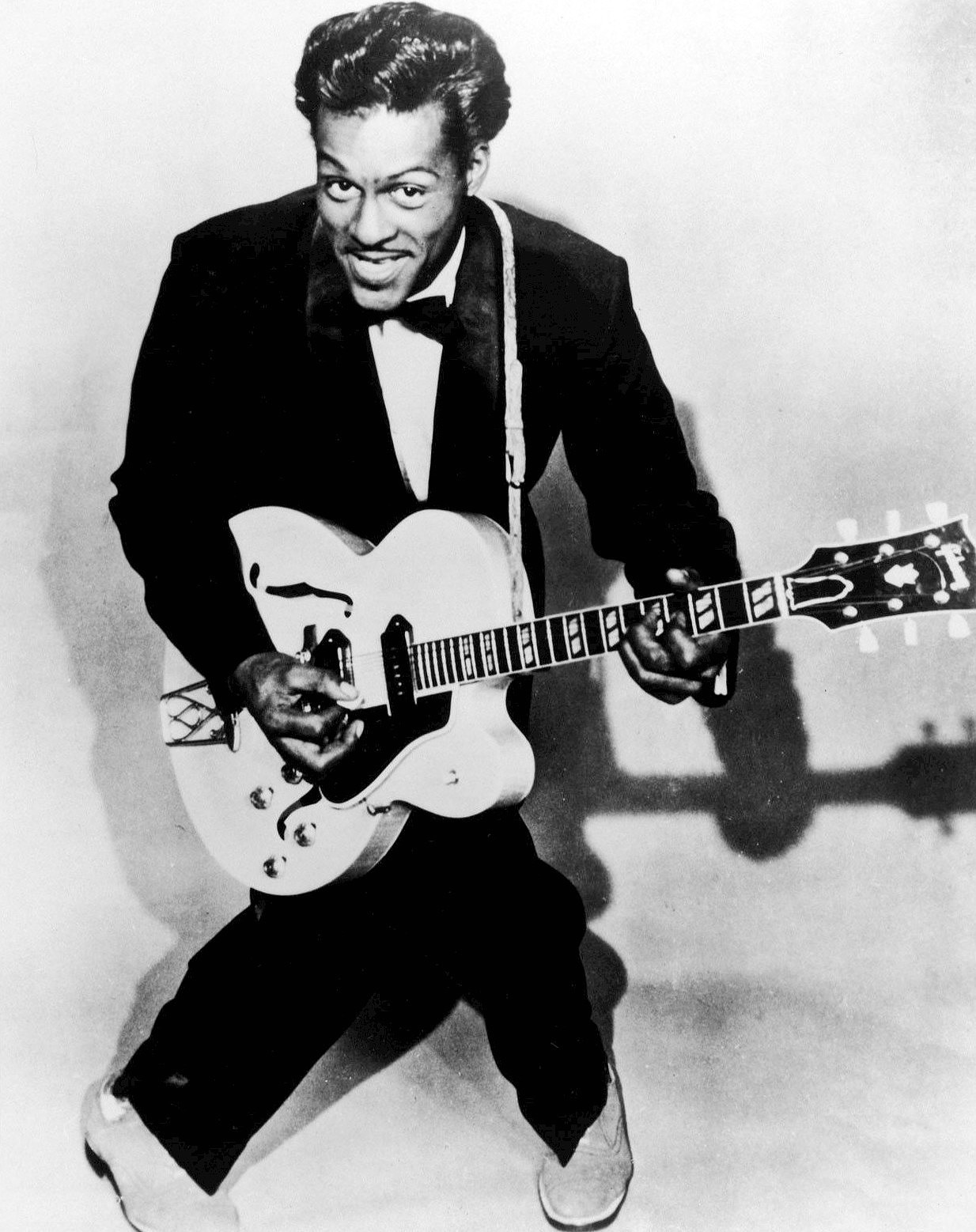
Chuck Berry in 1957

Chuck Berry, Ozark Mountain Daredevils, James Pankow, Michael McDonald, and Sheryl Crow were from Missouri. The Urge came from St. Louis. Christofer Drew and his indie rock band Never Shout Never are from Joplin. Harlow from Kansas City signed to Greenworld records. Shaman's Harvest is from Jefferson City. Prog metal band Anacrusis is from St. Louis. In 2005, rock band Living Things gained national attention after the release of their album Ahead of the Lions. Cavo is from St. Louis. Puddle of Mudd is from Kansas City. Story Of The Year from St. Louis is multi-platinum. Greek Fire (band) Spawning from Story Of The Year also from St. Louis.

== Hip-hop ==
Tech N9ne from Kansas City helped popularize the chopper rap style in the late 1990s and co-founded the Strange Music label. Nelly from St. Louis had four #1 Billboard Hot 100 hits in the early 2000s, including "Hot in Herre" in 2002, and one with Murphy Lee. Metro Boomin from St. Louis has multiple #1 Billboard Hot 100 hits due to his production.

== Country ==
Branson, Missouri is a popular tourist destination in the Ozarks of southwestern Missouri with an association with mainstream country music. The town's popularity grew in the 1980s when a number of prominent country stars moved to the area, including Boxcar Willie, Sons of the Pioneers, and Roy Clark. Two major attractions had roots in the 1950s: the Shepherd of the Hills Theatre and Park, and Silver Dollar City. Modern music festivals in Branson include the Old-Time Fiddle Festival, Branson Jam, and the State of the Ozarks Fiddlers Convention. The largest music venue in Branson is the Grand Palace, which seats upwards of 4,000 people.

Prominent local attractions in Branson include entrepreneur and performer Jennifer Wilson, a regional celebrity known for her show at the Americana Theatre, the Mabe family's Baldknobbers jamboree, which has been running for three generations, and Jim Owen of the Jim Owen Morning Show. The area's country music broadcasting history, however, can be traced to nearby Springfield, Missouri in the mid-1930s, when Ralph D. Foster's KWTO began carrying live performances and syndicating them to other stations across the country. The station's most famous program was Ozark Jubilee, which, starting in 1955, was carried live on ABC-TV across the country. Foster became a major figure in the region's music history; there is a museum named after him on the campus of the College of the Ozarks. Other national country music TV programs originating from Springfield included Five Star Jubilee and Talent Varieties. Country singer Porter Wagoner and TV entertainer Speck Rhodes were from West Plains, Missouri.

Branson's place as a tourist destination was sparked in large part by the publication of the popular novel The Shepherd of the Hills by Harold Bell Wright in 1907, which is set in the Branson area. It was the first novel in America to sell over a million copies, and readers flocked to Branson to see the places described in the book. The local music scene and a tourism industry developed as a result. Country pop singers such as Jerry Wallece, and Billy Swan were from Missouri. Other country singers from Missouri include Sara Evans, Chris Janson, Ferlin Husky, David Nail, and Billy Yates.

== Alt-country and indie rock ==
=== Mid-1980s ===
In the mid-1980s, the Saint Louis area (and nearby southern Illinois) was home to garage rock band the Primitives and rock band the Blue Moons. The Blue Moons featured Festus native Mark Ortmann on drums and Brian Henneman.

=== 1990s ===
The Primitives reorganized and transformed into Uncle Tupelo in the early 1990s. At the same time, Chicken Truck, an original outlaw country rock band, featuring Brian Henneman and drummer Mark Ortmann, was giving memorable performances in clubs such as Cicero's. Chicken Truck reorganized and became the indie roots rock band the Bottle Rockets in 1992. A country cover band called Coffee Creek linked all of these upstart bands. Coffee Creek was composed of Jay Farrar, Brian Henneman, Mike Heidorn, and Jeff Tweedy.

Uncle Tupelo disbanded in 1994. Founding members of Uncle Tupelo formed Son Volt and Wilco after the split.

Bottle Rockets became known for their hit songs, "Radar Gun", "$1,000 Car", and "I'll Be Comin' Around". Their success led to appearances on Late Night with Conan O'Brien performing one of their original songs and being featured in a comedic sketch.

=== 2000s ===
After extensive remodeling, Cicero's, in the art district of University City, became what is currently known as Blueberry Hill's Duck Room. Chuck Berry performed there frequently until 2014, and the venue hosts national touring rock music artists.

Angel Olsen is a folk and indie rock singer, songwriter, and guitarist who was raised in St. Louis. Nathaniel Rateliff was born in St. Louis and grew up in Hermann before initially relocating to Colorado to work with an evangelical ministry, after which he left religion and began pursuing music professionally.

== Music history ==
Springfield has a diverse musical heritage, serving as a center for mid-century country music broadcasting before fostering an underground garage rock and indie scene in the subsequent decades.

=== The country music era (1950s) ===
During the 1950s, Springfield rivaled Nashville as a premier hub for country and western music broadcasting. Under the executive leadership of media pioneer Si Siman and Ralph D. Foster, the city hosted the Ozark Jubilee, one of the first nationally televised country music variety shows, which broadcast live from the Jewell Theatre downtown from 1955 to 1960. This era also saw the rise of diverse local talent, such as The Philharmonics, a versatile African-American vocal quintet that regularly broke racial barriers on national telecasts during the decade.

=== 1960s garage rock and independent labels ===
By the mid-1960s, Springfield's musical landscape diversified away from strict country variety into independent rock, rockabilly, and garage rock, driven by specialized regional boutique record labels and localized publishing houses.

- Skipper Records: Established in 1965 by Si Siman, Ralph Foster, and John B. Mahaffey, Skipper Records was a boutique independent label that served as an early launchpad for songwriter Wayne Carson and future record executive David Kershenbaum. Though it only released approximately eight singles before folding in 1966, it remains a notable piece of the city's mid-decade transition into modern pop production.
- Table Rock Music, Inc.: Formed in September 1965, Table Rock Music was a localized music publishing firm managed in tandem with Earl Barton Music by the Nashville-based Gary Walker & Associates. The company signed wild rockabilly singer-songwriter Ronnie Self as its primary staff writer during his later career.
- Scratch Records: Operating out of the Radio-TV Building in downtown Springfield, Scratch Records was a highly regional independent imprint active in 1967. The label is historically significant for documenting the localized shift toward garage rock, most notably releasing the rare July 1967 psych-pop single "Summer Nights" / "Settle Down" by local teenage garage outfit The Esquires (composed of students from Parkview High School), alongside late-career singles by Ronnie Self.
- Self Publishing, Inc.: Heavily tied to the family musical legacy of Ronnie Self and his relatives Wavie Self and Vuckii Argee, the localized entity was utilized by music producer Billy Self, who notably produced late-era tracks for Ronnie Self, including the single "6 12-packs Later".

=== Modern era ===
In the 1970s, Springfield achieved global rock prominence via The Ozark Mountain Daredevils, who blended country-rock with pop melodies. Today, the city remains an anchor for independent music and audio manufacturing, housing the National Audio Company—the world's largest manufacturer of cassette tapes—and fostering modern chart-topping pop and indie artists like Chappell Roan and Someone Still Loves You Boris Yeltsin.

== See also ==
- Lucia Pamela
- Emma Lou Diemer
- Culture of St. Louis
- American folk music
- University of Missouri School of Music
