= Mary Celestia Parler =

American folklorist (1904–1981)

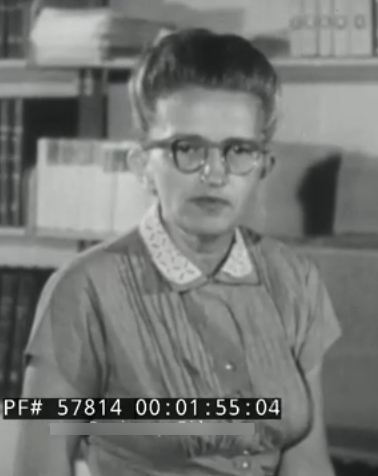
American folklorist Mary Celestia Parler (1904–1981), also known as Mary Celestia Parler Randolph, in 1954, appearing in the CBS / University of Arkansas documentary “The Search for Yokum Creek”

Mary Celestia Parler (1904 - September 15, 1981) was a folklorist and professor at the University of Arkansas. She and her husband Vance Randolph recorded folk music in Northern Arkansas from the 1930s until the 1960s. They also established the Arkansas Folklore Society in 1950. It lasted until 1960. Folklorist Rachel Reynolds wrote a chapter about her in Arkansas Women: Their Lives and Times.

She made recordings with Max Hunter. She recorded Maxine Hite singing The Dogs and her gun in Prairie Grove, Washington County, Arkansas, in 1959.

During the 1950s, Robert Mottar accompanied Parler undertaking the Folklore Research Project (1949–1965). His photographs feature Mary Celestia Parler and others active in collecting folklore, as well as the subjects of Ozark folklore studies.
