= Mary Alicia Owen =

American author (1850–1935)

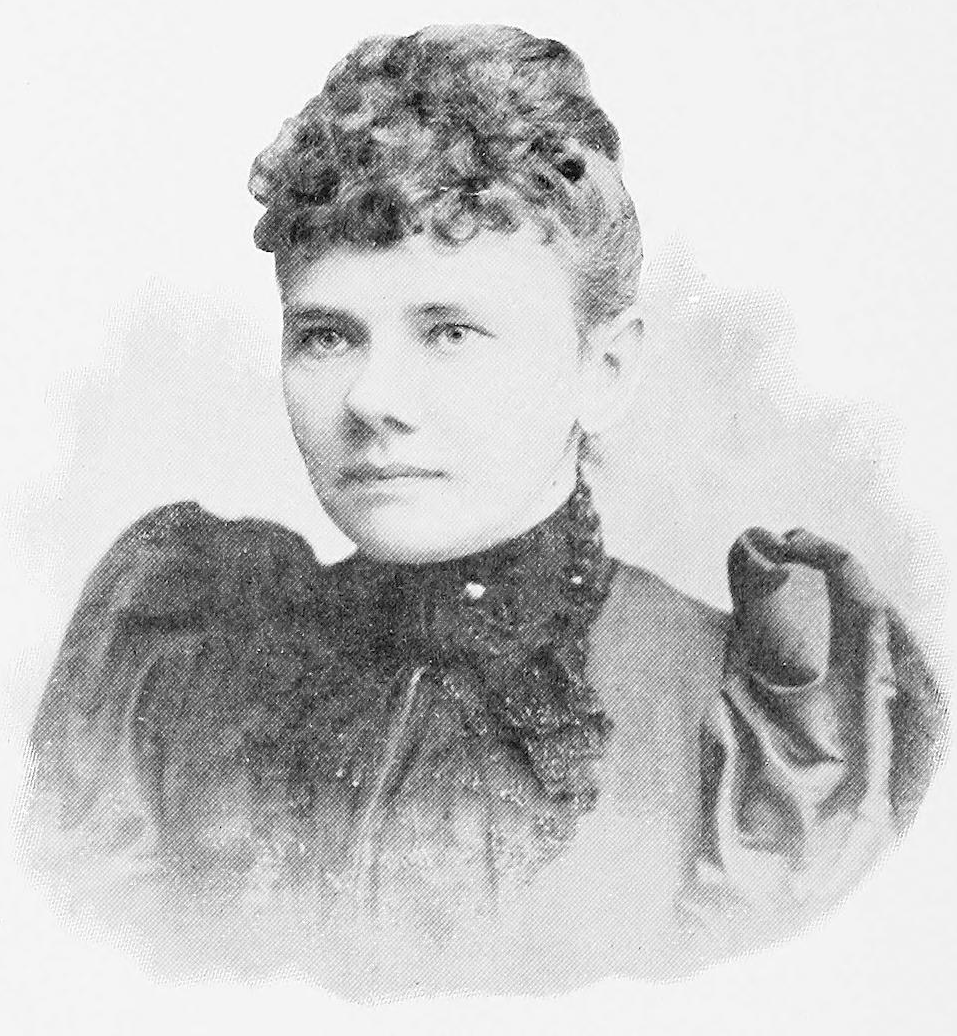

Mary Alicia Owen (January 29, 1850 – January 5, 1935) was an American author and folklore collector in the state of Missouri. She compiled several works of local legend and voodoo.

== Early life ==
Owen was born on January 29, 1850, in St. Joseph, Missouri. Her grandparents, Agnes Gilmore Crookes Cargill and James Cargill, were early settlers of the town in 1843 and her grandfather built a gristmill in the town, becoming a successful businessman. Their youngest child, Agnes Jeanette Cargill, married James A. Owen, a lawyer, who became a partner in their mill business. Owen had four younger siblings: Luella Agnes, Herbert Alfred, Florence Alma, and Juliette Amelia.

While she was growing up, her family had six enslaved people and Owen would often listen to their myths and stories, particularly those of Mymee Whitehead, who practiced hoodoo. As there were no local public schools at the time, Owen attended private schools until the start of the Civil War in April 1861, when she was taught at home by her mother. The Civil War was a fraught time for the family as the town was controlled by Union soldiers and they were Southern slave owners. The family mill was burned down and her father was briefly imprisoned in jail. At the end of the war, Owen spent three years at Patee Female College in St. Joseph and then, in 1869, she moved to Poughkeepsie, New York, to spend a year attending Vassar College.

== Career ==
She became inspired to record the disappearing folk tales after reading Algonquin Legends of New England, beginning a correspondence with Charles Godfrey Leland. Her earliest publication was Old Rabbit the Voodoo, and other Sorcerers, printed with an introduction by Leland, which was favourably reviewed in the English journal Folk-Lore; the reviewer, Edwin Sidney Hartland, dismisses Leland's request for consideration as a first work and says of it, "[f]rom the first page to the last there is not a dull page...". Her research and fieldwork had already been reported in a paper she read before the 1891 Second International Folk-Congress in London, which was printed in the Transactions of the conference as "Among the Voodoos". Her principal work was Voodoo tales as told among the Negroes of the southwest. Owen gave long service to The Missouri Folklore Society, serving as its president until the year of her death.

Owen also published articles in Century Magazine and Overland Monthly, writing as Julia Scott, and contributed reviews and journalism to other periodicals.

== Later life ==
Owen remained unmarried, as did her sisters, with whom she shared a home in St. Joseph from her return from Vassar until her death on January 5, 1935. She was buried in her family mausoleum in Mount Mora Cemetery.

== Controversy ==
Owen is considered an important folklorist today for documenting customs and ceremonies of African Americans and Native Americans which are no longer around today, but some criticize her work for being racist. Owen was part of the popular belief during the time that African Americans and Native Americans were lesser because they did not live up to the European ideal of civility. While her work contains important elements about the cultures of African Americans and Native Americans, it is also important to note that her own views regarding race might have impacted her documenting.
