= Sidney Painter =

American historian (1902–1960)

- Portrait by Robert Mottar, 1954
- Born: September 23, 1902; New York City, New York, U.S.
- Died: January 12, 1960 (aged 57); Baltimore, Maryland, U.S.
- Education: Yale University (BA, PhD)
- Occupation: Historian
- Writing career
- Period: 20th century
- Genre: Medieval History

Sidney Painter (September 23, 1902 – January 12, 1960) was an American medievalist and historian. He was a fellow of the Mediaeval Academy and professor of history and chairman of the department of history at Johns Hopkins University.

== Life and career ==
Painter was born in New York City; after the Taft School he attended Yale University (AB 1925; PhD 1930). He was an influential member of American academia in the 1950s and served on many boards and committees. He was treasurer and secretary of the American Council of Learned Societies and was a member of the council of the Mediaeval Academy. He was made a fellow in 1953. That same year, he was elected to the American Philosophical Society. He was elected to the American Academy of Arts and Sciences in 1958.

He wrote many influential books. His doctoral thesis was later published as "William Marshal: Knight-Errant, Baron, and Regent of England", and was supervised by Professor Sydney K. Mitchell at Yale University. He was an expert in medieval institutions but also believed in relating history from personal perspectives. He argued that the reign of King John cannot be understood without an intimate knowledge of the barons and their families and the division of family lands at the time.

He died in Baltimore at the age of 57.

== Works ==
- William Marshal: Knight-Errant, Baron, and Regent of England (1933)
- The Scourge of the Clergy: Peter of Dreux, Duke of Brittany (1937)
- Studies in the History of the English Feudal Barony (1943)
- The Reign of King John (1949)
- A History of the Middle Ages, 284–1500 (1953), re-published as Western Europe in the Middle Ages, 300–1475, co-authored by Brian Tierney (1983)
- French Chivalry: Chivalric Ideas and Practices in Mediaeval France (1961)
- Feudalism and Liberty: Articles and Addresses (1961)
- Mediaeval Society
- The Rise of the Feudal Monarchies
