= John Quincy Wolf =

American folklorist

John Quincy Wolf Jr. (May 14, 1901 – March 14, 1972) was an American folklorist and college professor. He created the John Quincy Wolf Folklore Collection including Sacred Harp singings and Memphis blues. He transcribed and did field recordings in the Ozarks, "discovering" several notable musicians including Almeda Riddle, Ollie Gilbert, and Jimmy Driftwood. He also recorded Bukka White, Gus Cannon, and Furry Lewis.

His father, John Quincy Wolf Sr. (1864–1949) was born near Calico Rock, Arkansas. Stories from his life were collected and published as Life in the Leatherwoods.

Wolf Jr. went to Johns Hopkins University. He corresponded with H. L. Mencken.
