= Almeda Riddle =

American folk singer (1898–1986)

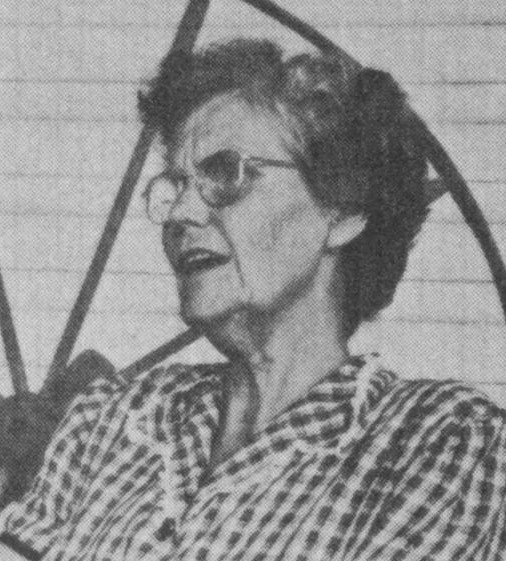
- Riddle in 1963

Background information
- Born: Almeda James; November 21, 1898; Cleburne County, Arkansas, U.S.
- Died: June 30, 1986 (aged 87) Heber Springs, Arkansas
- Genres: Folk
- Occupations: Singer, songwriter
- Instrument: Vocals
- Years active: 1959–1984
- Labels: Rounder, Prestige, Atlantic

Almeda Riddle (November 21, 1898 – June 30, 1986) was an American folk singer. She collected and sang traditional ballads throughout her life, usually unaccompanied. Some of Riddle's songs range back to 17th-century Ireland, England, and Scotland. Introduced to a wider public by folklorist John Quincy Wolf and musicologist Alan Lomax, Riddle recorded extensively, and she knew somewhere between 500 and 600 songs. In her old age, she was often known as Granny Riddle.

== Early life ==
Born Almeda James and raised in Cleburne County, Arkansas, she learned music from her father, a fiddler and teacher of shape note singing. "He made us learn the round note, but the shape notes are quicker read," Riddle said of her father. "We learned both the four and the eight note system. And anything I know the tune to".

She was a first cousin twice removed of the outlaws Frank and Jesse James. On a recording of the song "Jesse James" she noted, "I'm sure you've read of Frank and Jesse James. Well, my father's grandfather and their father (Robert S. James) was brothers. I never was ashamed of the James boys was my cousins, but neither was I proud of it."

In 1916, she married H. Pryce Riddle at the age of 18. They lived in Cleburne County, Arkansas, near Heber Springs. The couple had four children, but in November 1926, a tornado swept through Cleburne County and killed Almeda's husband and their baby. After losing her husband and baby, Riddle lived near Greers Ferry, Arkansas, and took care of her mother and three other children.

== Singing career ==
Riddle made her living by working as a nurse but she also enjoyed gardening, sewing, quilting, and reading. Riddle cared for her family for 26 years until John Quincy Wolf found her in 1952 and began trying to capture Riddle singing some of her old songs. In October 1959, on Wolf's recommendation, Lomax and Shirley Collins recorded Riddle at her home in Heber Springs in The Ozarks. The 23 songs reflected Lomax's interest in traditional ballads and songs for children. "At the age of sixty-two, after her mother's death, Almeda found herself starting on her new career "of getting out the old songs", as she put it, in person, in print, and on tape". Riddle toured all across the nation singing the traditional ballads and would frequently sing with people like Doc Watson, Pete Seeger, Mike Seeger, and Bob Dylan. Collins recalls that "she was a singer of such composure and quiet intensity, that you were compelled to listen.... There was such clarity in her style, and she had that rare and admirable quality of serving the songs, rather than the songs serving her."

Children's songs from this session were issued on American Folk Songs for Children in the Atlantic Records' Southern Folk Heritage series of LPs and was reissued as the Atlantic Records box set Southern Folk Heritage. In 1964, she recorded Songs and Ballads of the Ozarks for Vanguard Records. Several of her ballads were issued on various albums in the Prestige Records Southern Journey series of LPs, and reissued on CDs in the Rounder Records series Southern Journey: The Alan Lomax Collection. These records made Riddle widely known to participants in the American folk music revival. From 1962 onward, she accepted invitations to perform at folk festivals and college campuses. She toured extensively for twenty years until prevented by ill health.

In 1970, Riddle co-authored with folklorist Roger D. Abrahams an autobiography titled A Singer and Her Songs that included many of her songs. In 1972 and 1978, she made studio recordings for Rounder Records, which were issued on two solo LPs.

Riddle was a recipient of a 1983 National Heritage Fellowship awarded by the National Endowment for the Arts, which is the United States government's highest honor in the folk and traditional arts. In 1984, she was filmed by George West for Folkstreams. In the film titled Almeda Riddle: Now Let's Talk About Singing (released in 1985), she sang and spoke about her life and songs.

In December 1984, she moved into a nursing home in Heber Springs, where she died on June 30, 1986. She is buried next to her husband at Shiloh Cross Roads Cemetery.

The introduction to the 1997 cult film Gummo features Riddle's rendition of "I Love My Rooster".

== Discography ==
- Songs and Ballads of the Ozarks (Vanguard Records, 1964)
- Ballads and Hymns from the Ozarks (Rounder Records, 1972)
- More Ballads and Hymns from the Ozarks (Rounder Records, 1976)
- Granny Riddle's Songs and Ballads (Minstrel, 1977)
- My Old Cottage Home (reissue of Ballads and Hymns from the Ozarks; Albatros, 1979)
- How Firm a Foundation (Arkansas Traditions, 1985)
