= May Kennedy McCord =

American folklorist (1880–1979)

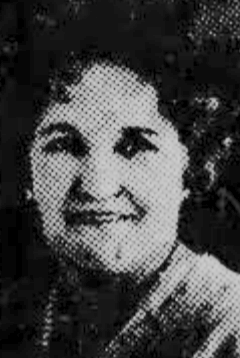
- May Kennedy McCord, from a 1933 newspaper
- Born: May Anderson Kennedy; December 1, 1880; Carthage, Missouri, U.S.
- Died: February 21, 1979 (aged 98); Springfield, Missouri, U.S.
- Occupations: Radio personality, newspaper columnist, singer, folklorist

May Anderson Kennedy McCord (December 1, 1880 – February 21, 1979) was an American newspaper columnist and radio personality based in Missouri, known as "Queen of the Hillbillies" and "First Lady of the Ozarks". Her writings and programs often focused on local legends, recipes, songs, and ghost stories. In 2022, the University of Arkansas Press published a compilation of her writings.

== Early life and education ==
Kennedy was born in Carthage, Missouri and raised in Galena, Missouri, the daughter of Jesse Thomas Kennedy and Delia Melissa Fike Thomas Kennedy (later Yocum). Her father died in Arizona in 1892, and her mother remarried in 1893. She learned to play guitar from her mother, and by 15 she was singing for audiences at community gatherings.

== Career ==
McCord wrote stories and poems from childhood, but had had her first story published in midlife. In 1931 she became vice president of the Ozark Writers Guild. She was also president of the Ozarkian-Hillcrofter Society of Missouri, Arkansas, and Oklahoma. In 1932, she began writing a newspaper column for the Springfield News-Leader titled "Hillbilly Heartbeats", which she continued until 1943. In the first column, she promised to "roll the pumpkin under the bed and scare out all the old-timers and poets, all the spinners and weavers and the lovers of plowed ground, the granny women, and the farmers, and their neighbors, the preachers and the doers, the dreamers, the lovers and the fiddlers." Her readers sent her stories, cures, ballads and recipes from their families to share in the newspaper, and she became a recognized authority on folk culture through her column, and acquired nicknames like "Queen of the Hillbillies" and "First Lady of the Ozarks".

McCord chaired the Ozarks section of the National Folk Festival in 1934, was a special guest at the Mountain Folk Song and Dance Festival in Asheville in 1936, and toured the United States as a lecturer and singer. She was a field agent for the Resettlement Administration during the 1930s. From 1942 to 1944, McCord hosted a weekly radio show, also named "Hillbilly Heartbeats". She returned to the radio in 1945, with a show on KWTO that ran until 1963. In 1950, she was named Missouri Mother of the Year. She was elected to the board of the Ozark Folklore Society. In 1961, for the 100th anniversary of the American Civil War, she sang at an event held at Wilson's Creek National Battlefield. She performed at the Arkansas Folk Festival in 1966. She enjoyed a longtime friendship with writer Carl Sandburg, and described him as "a wonderful man".

== Publications ==
- "Autograph Albums in the Ozarks" (1948, with Vance Randolph)

== Personal life ==
Kennedy married Charles McCord in 1903. They had three children, and lived in Springfield after 1918. Her husband died in 1945. She died in 1979, at the age of 98, in a Springfield nursing home. Recordings of McCord's radio broadcasts are in the Ozarkiana Collection at the College of the Ozarks. In 2022, the University of Arkansas Press published Queen of the Hillbillies: Writings of May Kennedy McCord, edited by Patti McCord and Kristene Sutliff.
