= Henry M. Belden =

American Folklorist

Henry Marvin Belden
- Born: October 3, 1865; Wilton, Connecticut, U.S.
- Died: May 17, 1954 (aged 88)
- Occupations: Folklorist, professor of English
- Employers: University of Missouri; University of Nebraska
- Known for: Pioneer collector of Missouri folksongs and ballads
- Notable work: Ballads and Songs Collected by the Missouri Folk-Lore Society (1940)
- Title: President of the American Folklore Society (1910–1911)

Henry Marvin Belden (1865 – May 17, 1954) was an American folklorist and pioneer collector of folksongs and ballads from Missouri.

== Early life and education ==
Belden was born in Wilton, Connecticut. He graduated from Trinity College in Hartford, Connecticut, and taught at a private training school for West Point candidates before undertaking graduate work in English at Johns Hopkins University in 1889.

During his doctoral research, Belden spent a year teaching at the University of Nebraska, where he met Willa Cather and Louise Pound (who also became a ballad scholar) and a year studying at the University of Strasbourg.

== Career ==
In 1895 Belden was appointed an assistant professor of English at the University of Missouri.

In January 1903, a club - later called the English Club - was begun at the university, initially with an interest in performing literary works: this developed into a group more focused on collecting the folksong and ballads of Missouri. This change was in part due to Belden understanding that a ballad sung at a Club meeting, was in fact a Child ballad: an important detail as Francis James Child had maintained that traditional ballads and song had not survived into the late 19th century. Belden became an active member of the club, encouraging his fellow members to collect songs locally and publishing an article resulting from their initial efforts in the Journal of American Folklore in 1906.

The English Club was reconstituted into the Missouri Folk-Lore Society in December 1906, with Belden as its Secretary. Belden's burgeoning research on ballads resulted in a leave of absence from his university role and a research trip to the British Museum in 1908. In 1916 and 1917, Belden also spent a year at Harvard University, carrying out further research on Missouri ballads.

Belden had planned a publication of Missouri folk song but his plans were disrupted by World War I and the energies of the Missouri Folklore Society slowed down in the 1920s and 1930s. Belden's Ballads and Songs Collected by the Missouri Folk-Lore Society was finally published in 1940. The books contained over 600 variants of roughly 280 ballads and songs, gathered by over 100 collectors - most of them students from the University of Missouri.

Belden carried on his research after his retirement from his academic post in 1935. He worked with Arthur Palmer Hudson on the papers of the collector Frank Clyde Brown, to edit the ballad and folksong volumes of Brown's collection of North Carolina Folklore.

== Influence ==
Belden has been hailed as "a pioneer in his study of broadside and Native American balladry". His initial research focused on issues surrounding the origin and definition of ballads, later his research analysed the contexts that inspired the ballads creation.

Unlike some of his contemporaries Belden saw the importance in ballad collecting, of collecting music with text. He also stressed the need to record details when collecting on both the ballad singer and their sources.

== Recognition ==
Belden served as the president of the American Folklore Society between 1910 and 1911. He used his presidential address to argue against the theory of the communal origin of ballads, as argued by scholars such as Francis Barton Gummere.

== Selected publications ==
Belden, H. M. (1905). Ranordine, Rinordine, Rinor. The Journal of American Folklore, 18(71), 322–322. https://doi.org/10.2307/534706

Belden, H. M. (1906). Old-Country Ballads in Missouri. I. The Journal of American Folklore, 19(74), 231–240. https://doi.org/10.2307/534570

Belden, H. M. (1906). Old-Country Ballads in Missouri. II. The Journal of American Folklore, 19(75), 281–299. https://doi.org/10.2307/534435

Belden, H. M. (1907). Old-Country Ballads in Missouri. “Geordie.” The Journal of American Folklore, 20(79), 319–320. https://doi.org/10.2307/534482

Belden, H. M. (1911). The Relation of Balladry to Folk-Lore. The Journal of American Folklore, 24(91), 1–13. https://doi.org/10.2307/534826

Belden, H. M. (1912). Balladry in America. The Journal of American Folklore, 25(95), 1–23. https://doi.org/10.2307/534464

Belden, H. M. (1910). Three Old Ballads from Missouri. The Journal of American Folklore, 23(90), 429–431. https://doi.org/10.2307/534328

Belden, H.M., ed. (1940). Ballads and Songs Collected by the Missouri Folk-Lore Society. University of Missouri Studies Vol. 15, No. 1. Columbia: University of Missouri. Ballads and songs collected by the Missouri folk-lore society. Columbia, MO. OCLC 906137854 (Reprint, with foreword by Edward Weatherly. Columbia: University of Missouri Press, 1955, 1973.)

Belden, Henry M., and Arthur Palmer Hudson, eds. (1952). The Frank C.Brown Collection of North Carolina Folklore. Vol. 3. Durham, NC: Duke University Press
