= Luella Agnes Owen =

American speleologist and geologist (1852 –1932)

Luella Agnes Owen (8 September 1852 – 31 May 1932) was a speleologist and geologist, noted for her early studies on caves in Missouri.

== Early life and education ==
Luella Agnes Owen was born in St. Joseph, Missouri on 8 September 1852. Her father, James Alfred Owen, was a lawyer. Her mother, Agnes Jeanette Owen (née Cargill), was the child of a wealthy businessman. She was the second of five children (Mary, Luella, Florence, Herbert, and Juliette) who survived to adulthood. Her older sister, Mary Alicia Owen, was a folklorist; her younger sister, Juliette Amelia Owen, was an ornithologist and botanist.

Luella attended a local private school before the Civil War. The Owen family were known Southern sympathizers. The Owen daughters were educated at home during the war years. Their mother was described as possessing "an eager mind and a retentive memory which gave her a solid base for the reading that throughout her life kept her well informed." After the war, Luella attended St. Joseph High School and graduated as the class valedictorian in 1872. She did not attend college, but studied geology on her own.

As a child, Owen showed early interest in the shells, fossils, and caves around St. Joseph, which became the subject of her later research. She was described as "brainy, brusque, and brave," like her father.

== Caves ==
Owen met Iker Galache, a Presbyterian minister from Kansas City, in 1873 and together they went spelunking around the caves near the newly completed Missouri River bridge at St. Joseph. Later she studied glacial deposits in northern Minnesota and explored caves around southern Missouri, the Black Hills, and Yellowstone. While she sometimes faced difficulties visiting caves, in part because she was a woman, her fearless attitude encouraged men "cavers" to take her along with them. She had several mentors who were geologists, including James Todd, George Frederick Wright, and Newton Horace Winchell, that encouraged her to publish her research in foreign and American journals.

Before her father's death in 1890, Owen wrote under a now-unknown pseudonym. The first article published under her own name, titled "Cavernes Americaines," appeared in Spelunca, the bulletin of the French Societé de Spelelogie in 1896. At the time, she was their only woman member. She also published in the American Mining Engineer Journal and American Geologist, among others. She contributed important proof, in 1897, that the Grand Canyon of the Yellowstone was the remains of a geyser basin and her last scientific paper on caves, "Les Cavernes de Ha Ha Tonka," appeared in 1898.

Researchers believe Owen conducted her field studies over a five to seven year period beginning in 1892, leading up to the 1898 publication of her book Cave Regions of the Ozarks and Black Hills. It was the first and only reference on Missouri caves for about 50 years. In her book, she was an early advocate for the preservation of caves. She wrote that:

"Unfortunately, most of the caves in this region [the Ozarks] have been deprived of great quantities of their beautiful adornment by visitors who are allowed to choose the best and remove it in such quantities as may suit their convenience and pleasure. Those who own the caves, and those who visit them, would do well to remember that if all the natural adornment should be allowed to remain in its original position, it would continue to afford pleasure to many persons for an indefinite time; but if broken, removed and scattered the pleasure to a few will be comparatively little and that short-lived. The gift of beauty should always be honored and protected for the public good."

Owen was elected a life fellow of the American Association for the Advancement of Science and in 1900, she took a year-long trip around the world as a working member of the American Geographic Society, along with the famous explorer Admiral Robert E. Peary.

== Loess soil ==
Owen studied the Pleistocene loess deposits around the Missouri River bluffs. Her first paper on the subject, "The Bluffs of the Missouri River" discussed the loess soil in the area. She wrote an article called "More Concerning the Lancing Skeleton" in the Bibliotheca Sacra in 1903 and presented a paper on "The Loess of St. Joseph" at an American Association for the Advancement of Science meeting in January 1904. She published research on "Evidence of the Disposition of Loess" in American Geologist in 1905.

In 1908 she went to Geneva to present her paper on "The Missouri River and Its Future Importance to Europe" at the Ninth International Geographical Congress; the paper was later published in the Scottish Geographic Magazine and reprinted in the US Congressional Record of January 28, 1913.

She published her "Later Studies on the Loess" in 1926.

== Death and legacy ==
Owen died of pneumonia on May 31, 1932. Her obituary described her thus:

"She [Luella] was an indefatigable student and was versed in astronomy and chemistry. As was the fashion in education in her youth, she was taught artistic accomplishments. Her talent for painting was quite marked, and her family has many fine specimens of her work with the brush, especially portraits. In her exploration of caves, she was fearless, though her daring caused many apprehensions to those closest to her."

She was engaged in research up to her death in 1932. She and her sisters were remarkable both during and after their lifetimes for their scientific accomplishments. She and her sisters received an entry in the 1921 Centennial History of Missouri compiled by Walter B. Stephens and have been the subject of several biographies.

== Bibliography ==
- Luella Agnes Owen, "Floods in the Great Interior Valley of North America," The Geographical Journal, 35 (1910/01/01), 56. DOI: 10.2307/1777118
- Luella Agnes Owen, "Evidence on the deposition of loess," [publisher not identified], [New York], 1905. "Reprinted from the American geologist, vol. XXXV, May 1905."
- Luella Agnes Owen, "The bluffs of the Missouri river," [publisher not identified], 1901. "Aus: Verhandlungen des 7. Internationalen Geographen-Kongresses Berlin 1899; 2. Seite 686-690."
- Luella Agnes Owen, Cave Regions of the Ozarks and the Black Hills, Cincinnati: The Editor Publishing Co., 1898. https://www.loc.gov/item/98001349/
