= Missouri Folklore Society =

Historical society for Missouri folklore

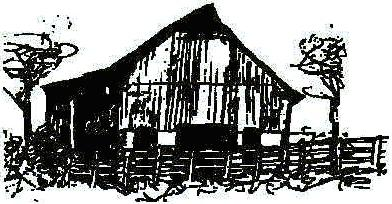
MFS logo, drawn by Cathy Barton Para

The Missouri Folklore Society was organized December 15, 1906, "to encourage the collection, preservation and study of folklore in the widest sense, including customs, institutions, beliefs, signs, legends, language, literature, musical arts, and folk arts and crafts of all ethnic groups throughout the State of Missouri."

== History ==
The roots of MFS go back to a meeting held in the offices of the English Department at the University of Missouri at the turn of the twentieth century. The "Writer’s Club" expressed interest in "folksongs and literary material to be found in Missouri," as reported in the M.S.U. Independent on March 6, 1903. The State Historical Society of Missouri had recently opened its library in what is now Jesse Hall, and this may have increased interest in local history.

The students of the English Club proposed to gather their papers on the lore of Missouri into bound volumes, as an archive for future researchers. Mary Alicia Owen, writer and folklorist, was a founding member of the Missouri Folklore Society.

This collection project, with leadership from the English Club's faculty sponsor, Henry M. Belden, and its secretary-treasurer, Maude Williams, formed the basis for the society's most-cited work, Ballads and Songs Collected by the Missouri Folklore Society, published in 1940, second edition 1955; reprinted 1966 and 1973.

The collection project was an item of discussion at the 1905 meeting of the Modern Language Society in Chicago, where the fact that ancient ballads continued to be sung in rural areas was received as something of a revelation. In addition to a local sort of patriotism, the primary warrant for preserving a given text was that it could be traced to a prior tradition (especially one documentable in the British Isles, ideally in Thomas Percy’s 1765 Reliques of Ancient English Poetry or the English and Scottish Popular Ballads (1882-98) of Francis James Child. Belden published results of his students’ researches in Modern Philology and the Journal of American Folklore, and the club had achieved sufficient stability as to establish itself officially on December 15, 1906.

The innovations here are numerous: the recognition of fieldwork as an academic enterprise, the development of collection and archiving protocols, and the participation of undergraduates in original research (a novelty which lies behind such projects as the Foxfire books, Bittersweet and The Chariton Collector). Early proceedings show awareness of the dual orientations of the society, both to literature and to anthropology. From an early date, there was recognition of the need to collect the lore of the state's Black and Native American communities. The Missouri Folklore Society provided the impetus (and expertise) for other such organizations, notably the Texas Folklore Society. Belden became prominent in national folklore circles, serving as president of the American Folklore Society and working closely with such period luminaries as the anthropologist Franz Boas and the literary scholar George Lyman Kittredge – again testifying to the new discipline's divided identity. Unfortunately, nothing came of the American Folklore Society's plans, much discussed in 1917, to publish the Missouri collection (which was substantially what it would be on its 1940 appearance).

The society did not participate in the increase in amateur and academic activity, the formation of organizations and the implementation of collection projects, which extended through the 1920s and 30s. As a result of a combination of factors, including disappointment over the derailment of the organization's signature project, but perhaps primarily because of a failure of continuity in leadership and philosophy, the society "fell into a coma in 1920 from which it has not recovered." Belden became increasingly busy with administrative duties and other research projects, as was the case too with what then seemed a fine choice for Belden's successor, Archer Taylor.

For these and other reasons, the society as such effectively went silent until 1977, though Missouri folklorists remained active, and Missouri folklore continued to be collected and studied by such as Ward Dorrance, Vance Randolph, Joseph Carrière, R.P. Christeson, Rosemary Thomas and others. A group consisting mainly of University of Missouri faculty met on March 30, 1977, for the re-activation of the society. During this time, the society started collecting materials, such as “correspondence, meeting minutes, publications, photographs, audio and audiovisual materials, clippings, membership lists, and annual meeting materials.” They began producing a historical journal in 1979.

The re-incarnation of MFS, led by Adolph and Rebecca Schroeder, Don Holliday and Cathy Barton (among others), was well-prepared with broad publicity and grass-roots participation from throughout the state. The basic frameworks for the annual Missouri Folklore Society Journal (long edited by Donald Lance) and the statewide meeting, to be held each year in a different part of the state were established.

For the continued existence and success of the society, there was an explicit recognition of the need to participate in multiple networks of likeminded organizations (for example the Ozarks States Folklore Society). The society recognized the legitimate participation of a variety of constituencies and stakeholders in folklore: academic scholars, certainly, but also performers, tradition-bearers, informants, and emerging folklorists. Since its reactivation, the Missouri Folklore Society has met annually in October or November.

In 2021, the Missouri Folklore Society published volumes 40 and 41: Emerging Folklorists. These volumes contain works by 17 Missouri college students from 2010 to 2019. Students majoring in English, linguistics, biology, and nursing majors took part in this issue.

== Works and Special Issues ==
- Ballads and Songs collected by the Missouri Folk-Lore Society. University of Missouri, Columbia, edited by H.M. Belden. 1940. OCLC 1572952
- Missouri Folklore Society Journal (Vols. 40–41) : Emerging Folklorists. Naciketas Press. 26 July 2021. ISBN 9781952232596, OCLC 1263272034
