= Orgeval, Aisne =

Orgeval
- Commune
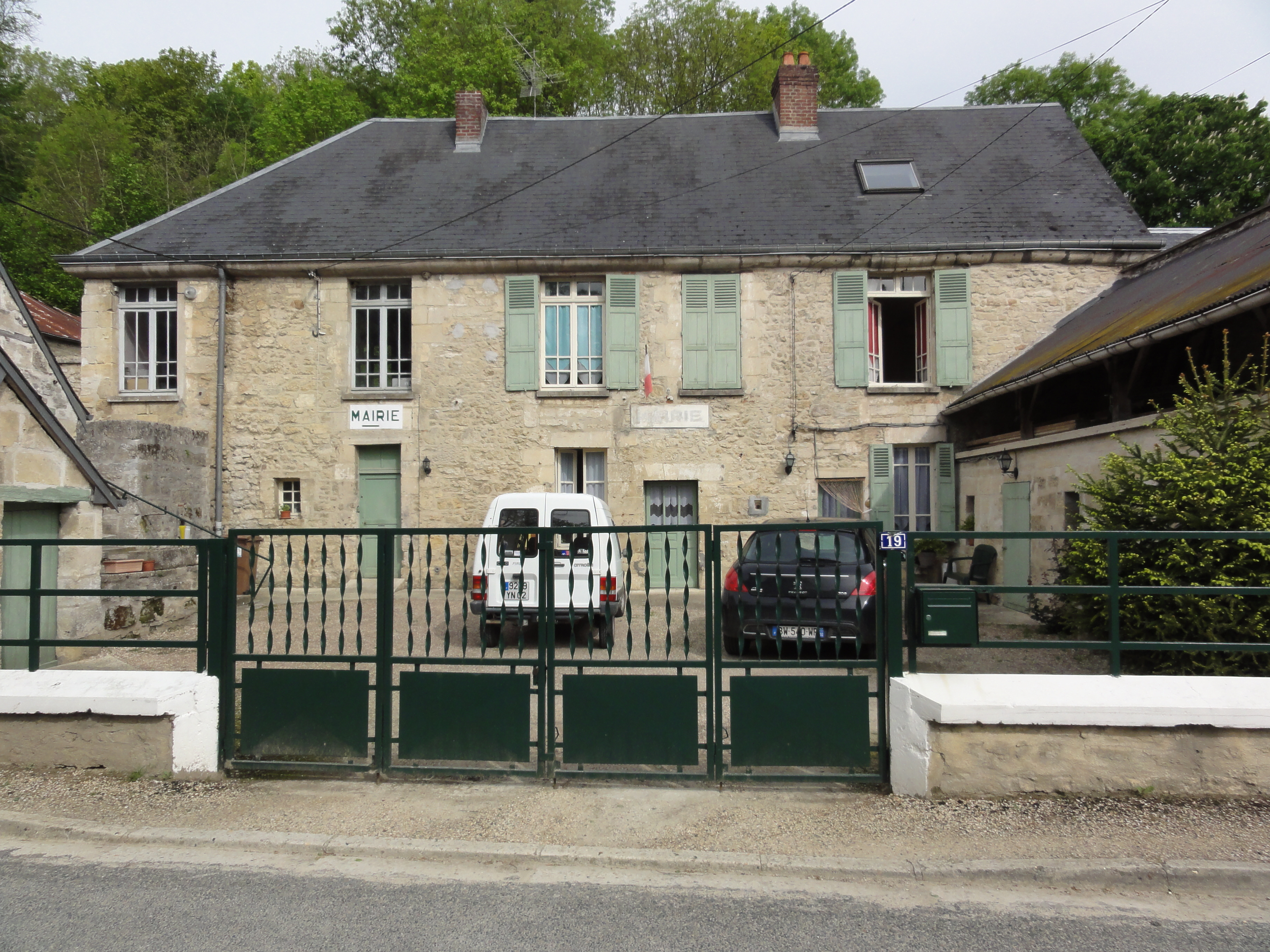
- The town hall of Orgeval
- Location of Orgeval
- Location within France Location within Hauts-de-France
- Coordinates: 49°30′30″N 3°42′16″E
- Country: France
- Region: Hauts-de-France
- Department: Aisne
- Arrondissement: Laon
- Canton: Laon-2
- Intercommunality: CA Pays de Laon

Government
  - Mayor (2026–32): Benoît Tronel
- Area^{1}: 2.41 km^{2} (0.93 sq mi)
- Elevation: 126 m (413 ft)
- Highest elevation: 189 m (620 ft)
- Lowest elevation: 101 m (331 ft)
- Population (2023): 53
  - Density: 22/km^{2} (57/sq mi)
- Time zone: UTC+01:00 (CET)
  - Summer (DST): UTC+02:00 (CEST)
- INSEE/Postal code: 02573 /02860
- ^{1} French Land Register data, which excludes lakes, ponds, glaciers > 1 km^{2} (0.386 sq mi or 247 acres) and river estuaries.

Orgeval (French pronunciation: [ɔʁʒəval]) is a commune in the Aisne department in Hauts-de-France in northern France.

== Population ==
Historical population
Year	Pop.	±% p.a.
1968	50	—
1975	76	+6.16%
1982	61	−3.09%
1990	60	−0.21%
1999	66	+1.06%
2007	69	+0.56%
2012	70	+0.29%
2017	66	−1.17%
2023	53	−3.59%
Source: INSEE

== See also ==
- Communes of the Aisne department
