= USS McCord =

Fletcher-class destroyer

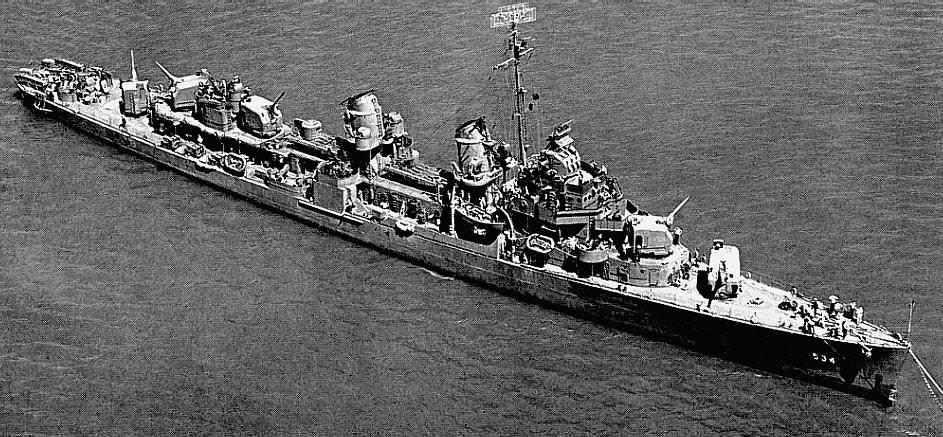
- McCord in August 1943

History

United States
- Name: McCord
- Namesake: Frank C. McCord
- Builder: Bethlehem Shipbuilding Corporation, San Francisco, California
- Laid down: 17 March 1942
- Launched: 10 January 1943
- Commissioned: 19 August 1943
- Decommissioned: 9 June 1954
- Stricken: 16 December 1971
- Fate: Sold for scrap, 2 January 1974

General characteristics
- Class & type: Fletcher-class destroyer
- Displacement: 2,050 tons
- Length: 376 ft 6 in (114.76 m)
- Beam: 39 ft 8 in (12.09 m)
- Draft: 17 ft 9 in (5.41 m)
- Installed power: 60,000 shp (45,000 kW)
- Propulsion: 2 propellers
- Speed: 35 knots (65 km/h; 40 mph)
- Range: 6,500 nmi (12,000 km; 7,500 mi) at 15 knots (28 km/h; 17 mph)
- Complement: 336
- Armament: 5 × single Mk 12 5 in (127 mm)/38 guns; 5 × twin 40 mm (1.6 in) Bofors AA guns; 7 × single 20 mm (0.8 in) Oerlikon AA guns; 2 × quintuple 21 in (533 mm) torpedo tubes; 6 × single depth charge throwers; 2 × depth charge racks

USS McCord (DD-534) was a World War II-era Fletcher-class destroyer built for the United States Navy during World War II.

== Namesake ==
Frank C. McCord was born on 2 August 1890 in Vincennes, Indiana. He was appointed Midshipman on 5 July 1907. From 1925 on, his career focused on naval aviation. On 30 June 1932, he was appointed as commanding officer of the rigid airship USS Akron. Commander McCord was on board when Akron encountered severe weather and crashed near Barnegat Light, New Jersey on 4 April 1933. McCord, and 71 others, including Rear Admiral William A. Moffett, were killed.

== Construction and commissioning ==
McCord was laid down on 17 March 1942 by the Bethlehem Shipbuilding Corporation, San Francisco, California and launched on 10 January 1943. The ship was commissioned on 19 August 1943.

== Service history ==
=== World War II ===
McCord, departing San Diego on 27 November 1943, joined the Pacific Fleet in time for operations in the Marshall Islands and Marianas, and remained in continuous action through the Palau, Philippines, Iwo Jima, and Okinawa campaigns.

She arrived off Kwajalein as a unit of Task Force 51 (TF 51), 30 January 1944. During Operation "Flintlock", she screened transports and provided rapid close support fire. On 15 February the task force sortied from Kwajalein to Eniwetok Atoll for operation "Catchpole". McCord at first screened the minesweepers as they cleared the passages into the 388-square-mile (1,000 km^{2}) lagoon and then screened the bombardment group as Engebi Island, containing the atoll's only airfield, was secured, 17–18 February. On 21 February, she steamed back to the southern end of the lagoon for the bombardment of Eniwetok and Parry Island.

By mid-March McCord had rendezvoused with TF 39 in the Bismarck Archipelago and for two weeks she cruised in the Ysabel Channel in support of landings at Emirau Island, 21 March. She next escorted replacement troops from Purvis Bay, Florida Island, to Emirau. Returning to Purvis Bay at the end of April, she departed 1 May to escort tankers to refueling positions in the Solomons area. On 11 June, after 2 weeks of antisubmarine patrols in the area around Bougainville and New Georgia, she arrived off New Ireland to bombard an enemy tank repair installation, resuming escort duties upon its destruction. Interrupting her escort service between the Admiralties and the Solomons on 23 July, she joined TF 52 at Saipan and took part in the shelling of Tinian.

The Palau Islands offensive was next. She arrived off Peleliu on 11 September and remained through 30 September to support the forces landed on the 15th. On her arrival at Manus 4 October, McCord joined CarDiv 22, 7th Fleet, as it prepared for operations in the central Philippines. She arrived at her assigned operating area east of the Philippines as landings were made at Suluan and Dinagat, 17 October. On the 25th her task unit, 77.4.1, came under constant air attack as the Battle off Samar raged 100 miles (160 km) to the north. Escaping damage, McCord protected her unit's carriers and rescued their pilots. She returned to Manus 3 November, but was back off Leyte by the 16th to prevent enemy surface forces from attacking Allied forces, installations, and shipping in the central Philippines.

On 6 December, at Ulithi, McCord joined the fast carrier force, TF 38. The force sortied from that island on 10 December and steamed to the Philippines to support the Mindoro landings by launching strikes against enemy airfields and harbors in the northern and central islands. Back at Ulithi by 24 December, they sortied again on 30 December. First they struck at Formosa, 3–6 January 1945. Then, in quick succession, they raided enemy installations and shipping in Indochina, southern Formosa, the China coast, the Philippines, eastern Formosa, and Okinawa. Constantly moving and always ready for targets of opportunity, the force's strikes were successful. While in the South China Sea on 11–12 January they sank or damaged almost 200,000 tons of enemy shipping.

The force returned to Ulithi 23 January, remaining until 10 February. On 16 February, strikes were launched against Tokyo itself; on 18 February against Chichi Jima; and on 20 February against Iwo Jima in support of the Marine units landed on 19 February. By 24 February, the planes from TF 58 were back over Tokyo and on 25 February they flew against defense installations in the Nagoya-Kobe area.

During March, McCord continued to operate in the screen of TG 58.4 as it concentrated its efforts against Okinawa and southern Kyūshū in preparation for the amphibious assault on the former 1 April. She remained in the Ryūkyū area until 12 May when she escorted the battleship South Dakota to Guam. She returned to Okinawa on 27 May for a final two weeks of combat. TG 58.4 then retired to Leyte Gulf, arriving 13 June.

McCord departed four days later for the west coast and a navy yard overhaul. On 8 July she arrived at Puget Sound, where she was docked when the Japanese surrender was announced. On 7 September she steamed to San Diego, reporting on 15 September to the Inactive Fleet.

=== Postwar ===
Decommissioning 15 January 1947, she remained berthed at San Diego until recommissioning 1 August 1951. Assigned to the Atlantic Fleet, McCord departed San Diego 1 November and reported to ComDesRon 28 at Norfolk on 17 November. For the next year she operated along the east coast, cruising as far north as Halifax, Nova Scotia and as far south as the British West Indies.

On 10 January 1953 the destroyer once again got underway for a western Pacific war zone. By 15 February she was off the west coast of Korea operating with carriers in TF 95. She remained in the Yellow Sea combat zone until mid-March when she received a week's availability at Sasebo. On 26 March she joined TF 77 as it ranged the east coast of Korea providing shore bombardment and fire support services where needed by the U.N. forces. Departing the battleline 17 April, McCord, joined TG 96.7in exercises off Okinawa. She rejoined TF 77, 14 May, and remained in the Sea of Japan operations area until 5 June when her Korean deployment terminated and she got underway for the United States.

Steaming via Subic Bay, Singapore, Aden, Suez, and Gibraltar, she arrived at Norfolk, Virginia 6 August. During the next months she operated off the southern east coast and in the Caribbean. She decommissioned 9 June 1954 and was berthed at Norfolk, where, as a unit of the Atlantic Reserve Fleet, she has remained into 1969.

== Bibliography ==
- Silverstone, Paul H. (2008). The Navy of World War II, 1922-1947. The U.S. Navy Warship Series. New York: Routledge. ISBN 978-0-415-97898-9.
