= Howard Wight Marshall =

American academic

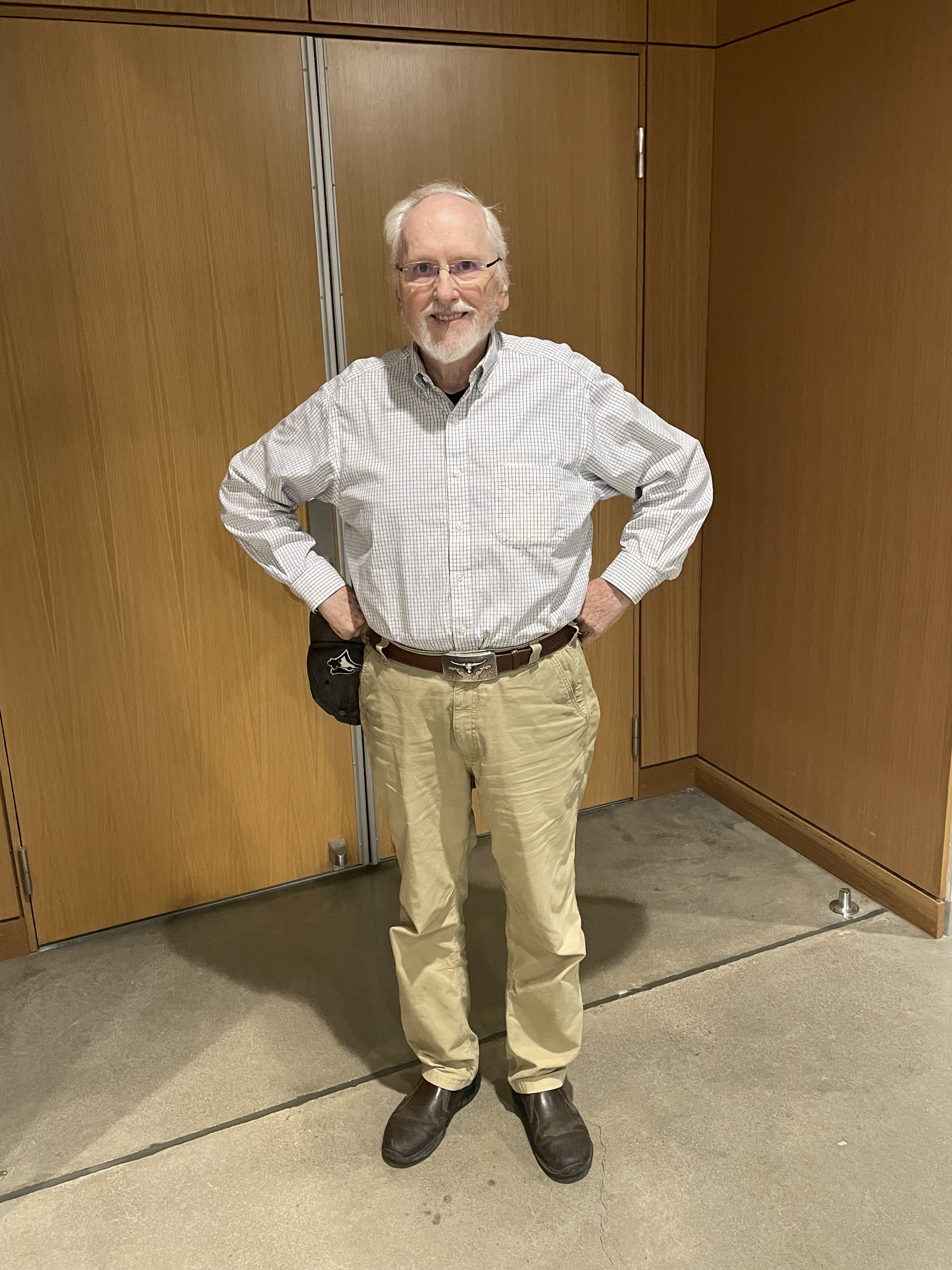
- Born: 1944 (age 81–82); Moberly, Missouri
- Occupations: professor, fiddler
- Known for: Missouri and Regional Art and Culture, especially fiddling

Academic background
- Education: University of Missouri (BA); Indiana University Bloomington (MA & PhD)

Academic work
- Institutions: University of Missouri

Howard Wight Marshall (born 1944) is an American academic, author, folklorist, historian, and fiddler. He is a professor emeritus and former chair of the Department of Art History and Archeology at the University of Missouri in Columbia, Missouri. In addition to his work on regional folk architecture he researches fiddling traditions in Missouri and the Ozarks, especially the style known as Missouri fiddling. Marshall is the founding director of the Missouri Cultural Heritage Center. In 2018, he received the Missouri Humanities Council Distinguished Literary Award.

== Early life and education ==
Marshall earned a bachelor's degree from the University of Missouri, and graduate degrees from Indiana University Bloomington. He served in the United States Marine Corps in the 1960s.

== Historical research ==
A significant amount of Howard Marshall's research is centered around folk music within Missouri. Of any singular topic, he has written the most about Missouri fiddling and Missouri fiddlers generally and biographical. Marshall's work on historical topics like Missouri Fiddling is highly detailed and respected for its depth and scope, particularly in his detailed biographies of musicians.

Now That's a Good Tune, Masters of Missouri Fiddling, details Missouri fiddling across various styles, contexts, and locations. Marshall argues that the genesis of the modern Missouri fiddling style is rooted most strongly in Southern and South-Eastern British-American cultural regions of the late eighteenth and early nineteenth centuries. This influence is heard throughout different geographic regions, which can be broadly sorted into North Missouri, Little Dixie, and the Ozark area. However, the style of Missouri fiddling has been influenced by the development of sheet music, radio, tunebooks, and television, making the overall sound across regions more homogenous over time. The work describes the effect of technological development as significant enough to consider it as a style separate from geographic regions.

In Play Me Something Quick and Devilish : Old-Time Fiddlers in Missouri, Marshall argues that the violin was the most important instrument in Missouri's folk history before the end of the nineteenth century when piano and eventually guitar became more prominent. This is partly because it was much easier to travel with compared to other instruments. Other factors include the violin's versatility across styles and its similarity to the human voice. Marshall states that the fiddle's great musical flexibility allows it to vary greatly across numerous ethnic and cultural heritages, ranging from indigenous American influences to how jazz influenced certain fiddle styles in the twentieth century.

Though Marshall has written in detail on abstract cultural and geographical differences in fiddling, he focuses in detail on the experiences of particular violinists, allowing him to elaborate on the source of generalizations and how and when these generalizations are relevant and applicable. For example, it is generally true that very fast, upbeat, and technical hoedowns win fiddle competitions, but this isn't always the case. Marshall's biography of Nile Wilson in Now That's A Good Tune: Masters of Missouri Fiddling details Wilson's personal experience of winning a fiddle competition with a slow waltz despite all the other contestants playing faster tunes. Some historians criticize Marshall's work, stating that he omitted key analyses regarding cultural politics. Marshall is also critiqued for being overly celebratory and uncritical in his biographical accounts despite their detail and for failing to connect his accounts into an overarching framework successfully. However, highly critical and more amicable reviews praise Marshall's depth of study and ability to record and describe different types of folk music.

== Works ==
- Folk Architecture in Little Dixie: a regional culture in Missouri (1981)
- Bucakroos in Paradise: Cowboy Life in Northern Nevada (1981)
- Missouri Artist Jesse Howard with a Contemplation on Idiosyncratic Art (1983)
- The German-American Experience in Missouri (1986)
- Paradise Valley, Nevada: The People and Buildings of an American Place (1995)
- Barns of Missouri: Storehouses of History (2003)
- Play Me Something Quick and Devilish: Old-Time Fiddlers in Missouri, Vol. 1 (2013)
- Fiddlers Dream: Old-Time Swing and Bluegrass Fiddling in 20th-century Missouri (2017)
- Keep it Old-Time: Fiddle Music in Missouri from the 1960s Folk Revival to the Present (2023)
