= Missouri fiddling =

Music genre

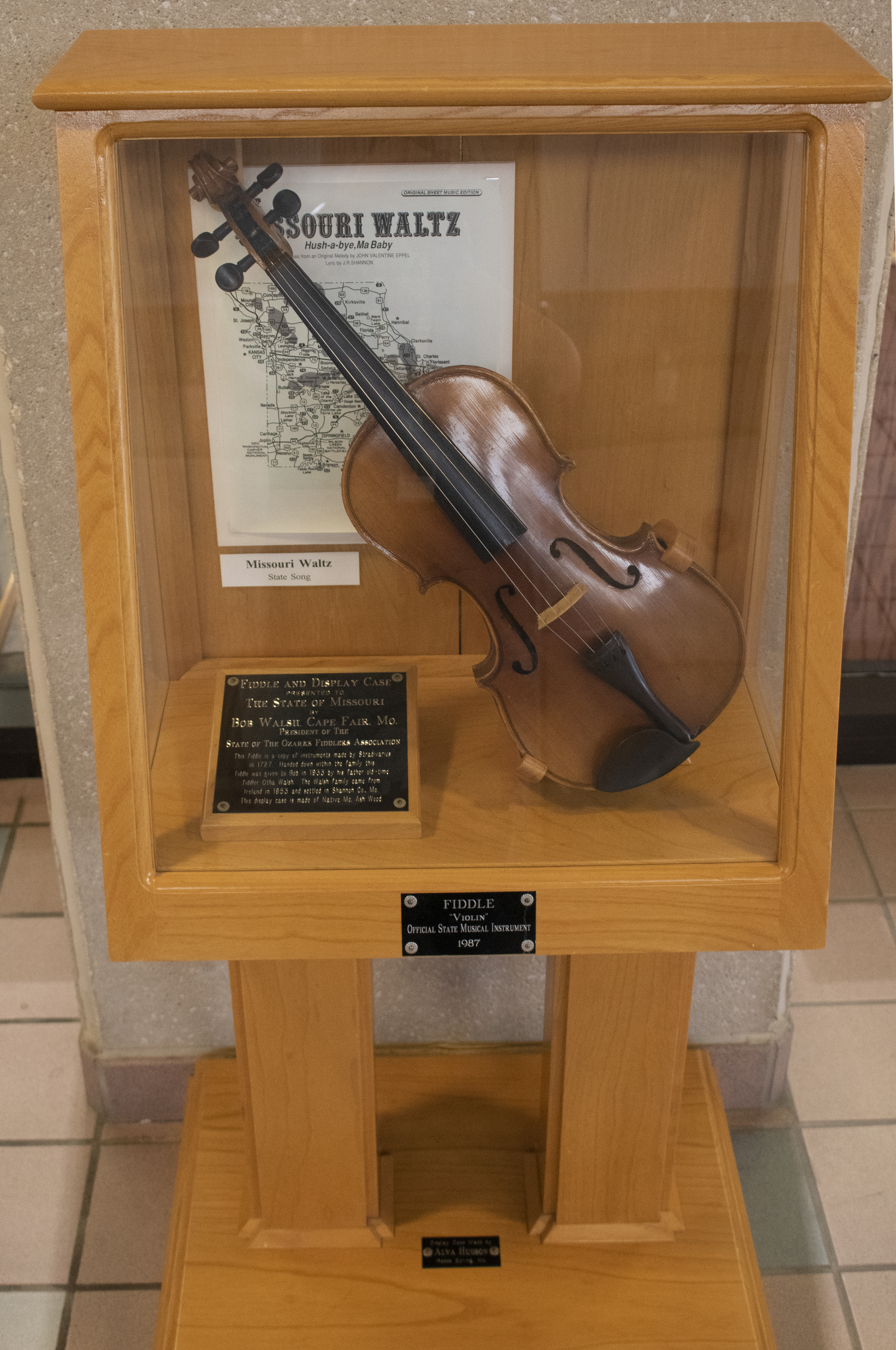
This fiddle was passed down through the Walsh family in the early 1900s.

Missouri fiddling is a unique style and repertoire of traditional folk violin playing practiced in Missouri, United States. Historian and fiddler Howard Wight Marshall has been active in its preservation and has published several full-length books on it. Today, numerous traditional jam sessions and fiddle competitions are held throughout the state, along with summer camps for aspiring young fiddlers

Though Missouri Fiddling seems niche in the wide music scene today, it is a diverse genre that involves many styles, and interests people from all walks of life. African-American fiddler Bill Katon spent many years playing fiddle tunes on Jefferson City radio stations, where his race wasn’t disclosed. Many listeners, even after learning about Katon’s background, refused to believe such a good fiddler could be black. Similarly, Carol Hascall, a woman from Polk County, Missouri, struggled to learn the fiddle through her youth as it wasn’t considered “lady-like,” at the time. Despite the resistance, she obtained her own instrument and played for years, entering in many fiddle competitions throughout the country.

== Regional variation ==
Some historical analyses of Missouri fiddling support the idea that it can be roughly classified geographically under three umbrella regions. These geographic styles from South to North are termed Ozark style (the Missouri section of the Ozarks), Little Dixie (central Missouri) style, and North Missouri style. These classifications are rough guidelines or oversimplifications of the differences between folk regions in Missouri.

The Ozark region includes a portion of southern and central Missouri, and parts of Arkansas, Illinois, Kansas, and Oklahoma. Some elements of traditional French settler folk music persist in the Ozarks, but German and English influences overshadowed them during the nineteenth century. Ozark fiddling is generally characterized by strong, rhythmic, and short bow strokes. This rhythmic emphasis combined with simple backup instrumentation helps create fast, upbeat dance music characteristic of the Ozark style. Performances within the Ozark style vary because of a departure from these traditional aspects of fiddle playing due to the influence of fiddling contests and the commercialization of fiddle playing within the Ozark area. These external factors pressure performers to play much smoother, making the hard-driving sound that defines Ozark style rarer.

Though geographically farther north than what is considered the Ozark region, the Little Dixie region is more strongly associated with the Southern historical character of Missouri. Little Dixie’s high concentration of enslaved persons before the Civil War led to it having the most African-American influence of the three regions. Though the initial settlers of this region were British, German immigrants in the nineteenth century significantly impacted the style of Little Dixie fiddling. Keys less typical of old-time fiddle tunes like F, B♭, and E♭ are more common in works from this region due to the violin’s stronger association with classical German music. Longer bow-strokes are more prominent in Little Dixie style compared to Ozark style, and the melodies tend to be more complex. Backup instrumentation is more varied and present in tunes of this style.

The North Missouri area had a much higher concentration of settlers coming from the northeastern states. Its fiddling style has more in common with the Little Dixie region than the Ozark region, particularly in its backup instrumentation. North Missouri style is distinct in slower-paced melodies being more common. It is often referred to as the hornpipe style because it has more elegant and regal aspects that seem more characteristic of wind repertoire when compared to other fiddle styles.
