= Vance Randolph =

American folklorist (1892–1980)

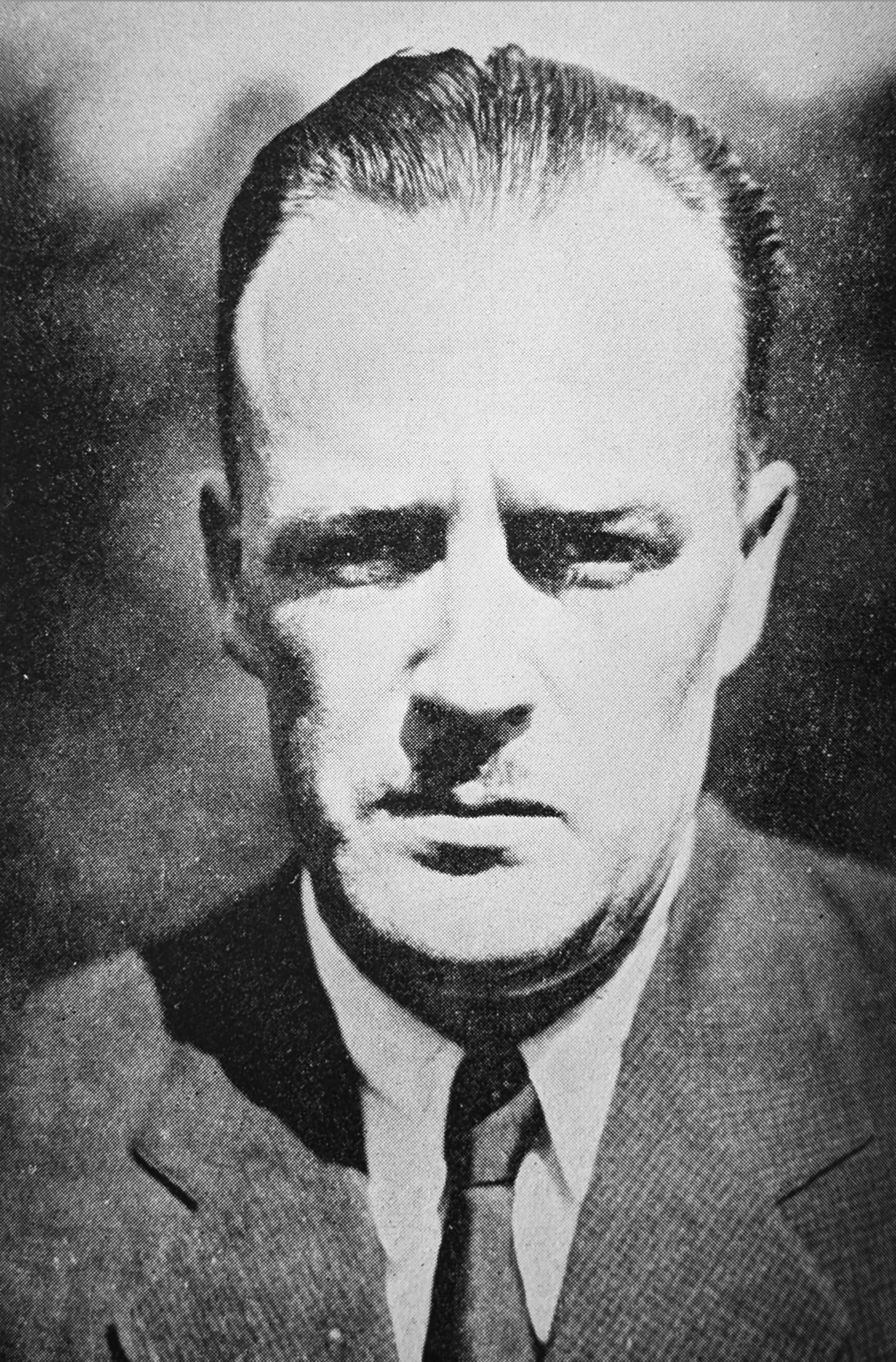
- Randolph in 1933
- Born: February 23, 1892; Pittsburg, Kansas
- Died: November 1, 1980 (aged 88)
- Resting place: Fayetteville National Cemetery
- Occupations: Writer, folklorist
- Writing career
- Period: 1927–80
- Genre: folklore

Vance Randolph (February 23, 1892 – November 1, 1980) was a folklorist who studied the folklore of the Ozarks in particular. He wrote a number of books on the Ozarks, as well as Little Blue Books and juvenile fiction.

== Early life ==
Randolph was born in Pittsburg, Kansas in 1892, the son of a lawyer and a teacher. Despite being born in a privileged home, Randolph dropped out of high school to work on left-leaning publications. This did not stop him from attending college and he graduated from what is now Pittsburg State University in 1914. He pursued graduate work at Clark University and received a Master of Arts degree in psychology. He later dedicated his book Ozark Superstitions (1947) to the memory of his Clark mentor G. Stanley Hall. In 1917, he was drafted into the U.S. Army during World War I, and served until the next year when he was given a disability discharge, never serving overseas.

== Career ==
In 1927, Randolph had his first article published in the Journal of American Folklore, based on work on Ozark dialect and folk beliefs. The dialect work led to multiple publications throughout the 1920s and 1930s in American Speech and Dialect Notes.

He moved to Pineville, McDonald County, Missouri in 1919. He never moved away from the Ozarks and remained in the Ozark Mountains from 1920 until his death. He made a living by writing for sporting and outdoor publications. While writing, Randolph used pseudonyms, but never for his work on the Ozark culture.

Randolph also wrote about non-folklore aspects of Ozark society, such as music. His Ozark Mountain Folks (1932) describes the creation of a distinctive church choir singing style created by a corps of uncredentialled, itinerant choral instructors.

Pissing in the Snow and Other Ozark Folktales (1976) was a national bestseller. He published over a dozen works on Ozark folklore. In 1949 he and the poet John Gould Fletcher founded the Ozark Folklore Society.

== Honors ==
In 1951, he received an honorary doctorate from the University of Arkansas. A longtime member of The Missouri Folklore Society, he was elected a Fellow of the American Folklore Society in 1978.

== Personal life ==
He met his first wife in McDonald County, Marie Wardlaw Wilbur and married in 1919. He married his second wife, Mary Celestia Parler in 1962.

== Death ==
Randolph died in 1980 in Fayetteville, Arkansas aged 88.

== Works ==
- The Ozarks: An American Survival of primitive society (Vanguard Press, 1931)
- Ozark Mountain Folks (The Vanguard Press, 1932)
- From an Ozark Holler: Stories of Ozark Mountain Folk (The Vanguard Press, 1933)
- The Camp on Wildcat Creek (Alfred A. Knopf, 1934) [juvenile fiction]
- Hedwig (The Vanguard Press, 1935) [novel]
- The Camp-Meeting Murders (The Vanguard Press, 1936) [mystery novel; co-authored with Nancy Clemens]
- A Reporter in the Ozarks: A Close-Up of a Picturesque and Unique Phase of American Life (Haldeman-Julius Publications, 1944)
- Ozark Superstitions (Columbia University Press, 1947); reissued as Ozark Magic and Folklore (Dover, 1964) ISBN 0-486-21181-9
- Ozark Folk Songs (four-volume anthology, 1946–50; 1980) ISBN 0-8262-0298-5
- We Always Lie to Strangers (Columbia University Press, 1951)
- Who Blowed up the Church House? (Columbia University Press, 1952)
- Down in the Holler: A Gallery of Ozark Folk Speech by Vance Randolph and George P. Wilson (University of Oklahoma Press, 1953)
- The Devil's Pretty Daughter (Columbia University Press, 1955)
- The Talking Turtle (Columbia University Press, 1957)
- Sticks in the Knapsack and Other Ozark Folk Tales (Columbia University Press, 1958)
- Hot Springs and Hell and Other Folk Jests and Anecdotes from the Ozarks (Folklore Associates, Inc., 1965)
- Pissing in the Snow and Other Ozark Folktales (University of Illinois Press, 1976; reissued 1997) ISBN 0-252-01364-6
- (with Gordon McCann) Ozark Folklore: An Annotated Bibliography (University of Missouri, 1987)
- Vance Randolph in the Ozarks (Branson, MO: Ozarks Mountaineer, 1991)
- Roll Me in Your Arms: "Unprintable" Ozark Folksongs and Folklore : Volume I Folk Songs and Music (1992) ISBN 1-55728-231-5
- Blow the Candle Out: "Unprintable" Ozark Folksongs and Folklore : Volume II Folk Rhymes and Other Lore (1992) ISBN 1-55728-237-4
- Stiff As a Poker: A Collection of Ozark Folk Tales (Federal Way, WA: Agora Books, 1993) (Originally published as The Devil's Pretty Daughter)
